= Internet censorship and surveillance by country =

This list of Internet censorship and surveillance by country provides information on the types and levels of Internet censorship and surveillance that is occurring in countries around the world.

== Classifications ==
Detailed country by country information on Internet censorship and surveillance is provided in the Freedom on the Net reports from Freedom House, by the OpenNet Initiative, by Reporters Without Borders, and in the Country Reports on Human Rights Practices from the U.S. State Department Bureau of Democracy, Human Rights, and Labor. The ratings produced by several of these organizations are summarized below as well as in the Censorship by country article.

=== Freedom on the Net reports ===
The Freedom on the Net reports provide analytical reports and numerical ratings regarding the state of Internet freedom for countries worldwide. The countries surveyed represent a sample with a broad range of geographical diversity and levels of economic development, as well as varying levels of political and media freedom. The surveys ask a set of questions designed to measure each country's level of Internet and digital media freedom, as well as the access and openness of other digital means of transmitting information, particularly mobile phones and text messaging services.

Results are presented for three areas:

- Obstacles to Access: infrastructural and economic barriers to access; governmental efforts to block specific applications or technologies; legal and ownership control over internet and mobile phone access providers.
- Limits on Content: filtering and blocking of websites; other forms of censorship and self-censorship; manipulation of content; the diversity of online news media; and usage of digital media for social and political activism.
- Violations of User Rights: legal protections and restrictions on online activity; surveillance and limits on privacy; and repercussions for online activity, such as legal prosecution, imprisonment, physical attacks, or other forms of harassment.

The results from the three areas are combined into a total score for a country (from 0 for best to 100 for worst) and countries are rated as "Free" (0 to 30), "Partly Free" (31 to 60), or "Not Free" (61 to 100) based on the totals.

The 2025 edition was the fifteenth edition of the report. There was no report in 2010.

Freedom on the Net survey results
	2009	2011	2012	2013	2014	2015	2016	2017	2018	2019	2020	2021	2022	2023	2024	2025
Countries	15	37	47	60	65	65	65	65	65	65	65	70	70	70	72	72
Free	4 (27%)	8 (22%)	14 (30%)	17 (29%)	19 (29%)	18 (28%)	17 (26%)	16 (25%)	15 (23%)	15 (23%)	15 (23%)	18 (26%)	17 (24%)	17 (24%)	19 (26%)	18 (25%)
Partly free	7 (47%)	18 (49%)	20 (43%)	29 (48%)	31 (48%)	28 (43%)	28 (43%)	28 (43%)	30 (46%)	29 (44%)	28 (43%)	31 (44%)	32 (46%)	32 (46%)	32 (44%)	32 (44%)
Not free	4 (27%)	11 (30%)	13 (28%)	14 (23%)	15 (23%)	19 (29%)	20 (31%)	21 (32%)	20 (31%)	21 (32%)	22 (33%)	21 (30%)	21 (30%)	21 (30%)	21 (29%)	22 (31%)
Improved	n/a	5 (33%)	11 (31%)	12 (26%)	12 (18%)	15 (23%)	34 (52%)	32 (49%)	19 (29%)	16 (25%)	26 (40%)	18 (26%)	26 (37%)	20 (29%)	18 (25%)	17 (24%)
Declined	n/a	9 (60%)	17 (47%)	28 (60%)	36 (55%)	32 (49%)	14 (22%)	13 (20%)	26 (40%)	33 (50%)	23 (35%)	30 (43%)	28 (40%)	29 (41%)	27 (38%)	28 (39%)
No change	n/a	1 (7%)	8 (22%)	7 (15%)	17 (26%)	18 (28%)	17 (26%)	20 (31%)	20 (31%)	16 (25%)	16 (25%)	22 (31%)	16 (23%)	21 (30%)	27 (38%)	27 (38%)

=== OpenNet Initiative ===
In a series of reports issued between 2007 and 2013 the OpenNet Initiative (ONI) classified the magnitude of censorship or filtering occurring in a country in four areas of activity.

The magnitude or level of censorship was classified as follows:

Pervasive: A large portion of content in several categories is blocked.
Substantial: A number of categories are subject to a medium level of filtering or many categories are subject to a low level of filtering.
Selective: A small number of specific sites are blocked or filtering targets a small number of categories or issues.
Suspected: It is suspected, but not confirmed, that Web sites are being blocked.
No evidence: No evidence of blocked Web sites, although other forms of controls may exist.

The classifications were done for the following areas of activity:

Political: Views and information in opposition to those of the current government or related to human rights, freedom of expression, minority rights, and religious movements.
Social: Views and information perceived as offensive or as socially sensitive, often related to sexuality, gambling, or illegal drugs and alcohol.
Conflict/security: Views and information related to armed conflicts, border disputes, separatist movements, and militant groups.
Internet tools: e-mail, Internet hosting, search, translation, and Voice-over Internet Protocol (VoIP) services, and censorship or filtering circumvention methods.

Due to legal concerns the ONI does not check for filtering of child pornography and because their classifications focus on technical filtering, they do not include other types of censorship.

Through 2010 the OpenNet Initiative had documented Internet filtering by governments in over forty countries worldwide. The level of filtering was classified in 26 countries in 2007 and in 25 countries in 2009. Of the 41 separate countries classified in these two years, seven were found to show no evidence of filtering (Egypt, France, Germany, India, the United Kingdom, and the United States), while one was found to engage in pervasive filtering in all areas (China), 13 were found to engage in pervasive filtering in one or more areas, and 34 were found to engage in some level of filtering in one or more areas. Of the 10 countries classified in both 2007 and 2009, one reduced its level of filtering (Pakistan), five increased their level of filtering (Azerbaijan, Belarus, Kazakhstan, South Korea, and Uzbekistan), and four maintained the same level of filtering (China, Iran, Myanmar, and Tajikistan).

In December 2014 ONI announced that:

After a decade of collaboration in the study and documentation of Internet filtering and control mechanisms around the world, the OpenNet Initiative partners will no longer carry out research under the ONI banner. The ONI website, including all reports and data, will be maintained indefinitely to allow continued public access to their entire archive of published work and data.

ONI's summarized global Internet filtering data was last updated on 20 September 2013.

=== Reporters Without Borders ===
==== RWB Enemies of the Internet and Countries under Surveillance lists ====
In 2006, Reporters Without Borders (Reporters sans frontières, RSF), a Paris-based international non-governmental organization that advocates freedom of the press, started publishing a list of "Enemies of the Internet". The organization classifies a country as an enemy of the internet because "all of these countries mark themselves out not just for their capacity to censor news and information online but also for their almost systematic repression of Internet users." In 2007 a second list of countries "Under Surveillance" (originally "Under Watch") was added.

Enemies of the Internet:
- Bahrain: 2012–2014
- Belarus: 2006–2008, 2012–2014
- Bangladesh: 2009–2014
- China: 2008–2014
- Cuba: 2006–2014
- Egypt: 2006–2010
- Ethiopia: 2014
- India: 2014
- Iran: 2006–2014
- Myanmar: 2006–2013
- North Korea: 2006–2014
- Pakistan: 2014
- Russia: 2014
- Saudi Arabia: 2006–2014
- Sudan: 2014
- Syria: 2006–2014
- Tunisia: 2006–2010
- Turkmenistan: 2006–2014
- United Arab Emirates: 2014
- United Kingdom: 2014
- United States: 2014
- Uzbekistan: 2006–2014
- Vietnam: 2006–2014
Current Countries Under Surveillance:
- Australia: 2009–present
- Bangladesh: 2009–present
- Egypt: 2011–present
- Eritrea: 2008–2009, 2011–present
- France: 2011–present
- Kazakhstan: 2008–present
- Malaysia: 2008–2009, 2011–present
- South Korea: 2009–present
- Sri Lanka: 2008–2009, 2011–present
- Thailand: 2008–present
- Tunisia: 2011–present
- Turkey: 2010–present
- Norway: 2020–present (only the metadata on traffic that crosses Norwegian borders)
- Ukraine: 2017–present

Past Countries Under Surveillance:

- Bahrain: 2008–2009 and 2011
- Belarus: 2009–2011
- India: 2008–13
- Jordan: 2008
- Libya: 2008 and 2011
- Russia: 2010–2013
- Tajikistan: 2008
- United Arab Emirates: 2008–2013
- Venezuela: 2011
- Yemen: 2008–2009

When the "Enemies of the Internet" list was introduced in 2006, it listed 13 countries. From 2006 to 2012 the number of countries listed fell to 10 and then rose to 12. The list was not updated in 2013. In 2014 the list grew to 19 with an increased emphasis on surveillance in addition to censorship. The list has not been updated since 2014.

When the "Countries under surveillance" list was introduced in 2008, it listed 10 countries. Between 2008 and 2012 the number of countries listed grew to 16 and then fell to 11. The number grew to 12 with the addition of Norway in 2020. The list was last updated in 2020.

==== RWB Special report on Internet Surveillance ====
On 12 March 2013 Reporters Without Borders published a Special report on Internet Surveillance. The report includes two new lists:

- a list of "State Enemies of the Internet", countries whose governments are involved in active, intrusive surveillance of news providers, resulting in grave violations of freedom of information and human rights; and
- a list of "Corporate Enemies of the Internet", companies that sell products that are liable to be used by governments to violate human rights and freedom of information.

The five "State Enemies of the Internet" named in March 2013 are: Bahrain, China, Iran, Syria, and Vietnam.

The five "Corporate Enemies of the Internet" named in March 2013 are: Amesys (France), Blue Coat Systems (U.S.), Gamma (UK and Germany), Hacking Team (Italy), and Trovicor (Germany).

=== Country Reports on Human Rights Practices ===
Country Reports on Human Rights Practices is an annual series of reports on human rights conditions in countries throughout the world. Among other topics the reports include information on freedom of speech and the press including Internet freedom; freedom of assembly and association; and arbitrary interference with privacy, family, home, or correspondence.

The reports are prepared by the Bureau of Democracy, Human Rights, and Labor within the United States Department of State. The reports cover internationally recognized individual, civil, political, and worker rights, as set forth in the Universal Declaration of Human Rights. The first report was issued in 1977 covering the year 1976.

== See also ==
- Internet censorship
- Global Internet Freedom Task Force – an initiative of the U.S. Department of State
- Internet censorship in the Arab Spring
- IFEX – monitors Internet censorship worldwide
  - Tunisia Monitoring Group
- Pirate politics
- Reporters sans frontières (Reporters Without Borders)
- The Web Index by the World Wide Web Foundation, a measure of the World Wide Web's contribution to social, economic and political progress in countries across the world.
- Computer and network surveillance – Monitoring of computer or network activity
- National intranet
- Splinternet
