= Internet censorship in Tunisia =

Internet censorship in Tunisia decreased in January 2011 following the ousting of President Zine El Abidine Ben Ali. The successor acting government removed filters on social networking sites, such as YouTube and Facebook.

The success of the Tunisian Revolution led to increased freedom of expression in Tunisia, a country previously subject to strict censorship, especially online. In March 2011, Reporters Without Borders removed Tunisia and Egypt from its "Internet enemies" list to its list of countries "under surveillance". However, there are also warnings that Internet censorship in other countries might increase following the events of the Arab Spring.

== Censorship during the Ben Ali regime ==
Prior to the Tunisian revolution, Internet censorship in Tunisia was extensive. Tunisia was on Reporters Without Borders' "Internet enemies" list. The OpenNet Initiative classified Internet filtering as pervasive in the political, social, and Internet tools areas and as selective in the conflict/security area in August 2009.

Ben Ali promised, "a removal of internet restrictions," among several other promises in a speech shortly before he was forced out.

In addition to filtering Web content, the government of Tunisia utilized laws, regulations, and surveillance to achieve strict control over the Internet. For example, journalists were prosecuted by Tunisia's press code, which bans offending the president, disturbing order, and publishing what the government perceives as false news. The government also restricted the media by controlling the registration of print media and licensing of broadcasters, refusing permission to critical outlets, and controlling the distribution public sector advertisement. Journalists are also charged in courts with vague violations of the penal code.

Online dissidents faced severe punishment. For example, human rights lawyer Mohamed Abbou was sentenced to three and a half years in prison in 2005 publishing a report accusing the government of torturing Tunisian prisoners on a banned website.

In a landmark legal case that challenged the Web filtering regime in the country, journalist and blogger Ziad El Hendi filed a legal suit against the Tunisian Internet Agency (ATI) for censoring social networking site Facebook. Facebook was blocked on August 18, 2008, then unblocked on September 2 at the Tunisian President's request. The Tunisian Union of Free Radio Stations and the Unionist Freedoms and Rights Observatory joined El Heni in the lawsuit and called Tunisian President Zine El Abidine Ben Ali to testify. The Third District Court of Tunisia, however, dismissed the case, in November 2008 without providing any explanation.

In addition to being blocked in Tunisia, many opposition and dissident Web sites and blogs were victims of hacking attempts and in some cases, successful content removal, and shutting down of servers. Even though it was not clear who was behind these cyber attacks, many Tunisian opposition leaders believed it to be the government. For example, the independent news sites Kalima was hacked into and shut down in October 2008. The eight-year Arabic and French archives were completely destroyed. The site had been blocked since it was launched in 2000. The administrator of the site accused the government of being behind the attack because, as she told the committee to Protect Journalists, "The only ones who benefit from this attack are the authorities." She also said, “I would not rule out the possibility that this act was committed by the secret services, with the aid of hackers or pirates based in Tunisia or abroad." The Web-based newsletter Tunis News and a blog run by a judge (TunisiaWatch) has been subject to similar attacks.

Tunisia did not have specific laws to regulate online broadcasting. As a result, a group of journalists exploited this and launched Tunisia's first Internet radio station, Radio 6, on 10 December 2007 to mark the 59th anniversary of the World Declaration of Human Rights.

=== Filtering during the Ben Ali regime ===
Web filtering in Tunisia was achieved through the use of a commercial software program, SmartFilter, sold by U.S.-based company Secure Computing. Because all fixed-line Internet traffic passed through facilities controlled by ATI, the government was able to load the software onto its servers and filter content consistently across Tunisia's eleven ISPs. Tunisia purposefully hid the filtering from Internet users by displaying the standard 404 “File Not Found” error message, which gives no hint that the requested site is being blocked.

A transparent proxy processed every HTTP request sent out and filtered out sites based on host names. Empirical evidence showed that NetApp hardware was used to implement the controls and NetCache.

The OpenNet Initiative carried out tests in Tunisia using the ISPs Planet Tunisie and TopNet. Similar to 2006-2007 test results, 2008-2009 testing revealed pervasive filtering of Web sites of political opposition groups such as:

- Democratic Forum for Labor and Liberty (www.fdtl.org)
- Al-Nadha Movement (www.nahdha.info)
- Tunisian Workers' Communist Party (www.albadil.org)
- Democratic Progressive Party (pdpinfo.org)

Also blocked were Web sites run by opposition figures such as activist Moncef Marzouki and Web sites that contain oppositional news and politics such as:

- www.nawaat.org
- www.perspectivestunisiennes.net
- www.tunisnews.com
- www.tunezine.com

Web sites that publish oppositional articles by Tunisian journalists were also blocked. For example, ONI verified the blocking of the French daily Libération Web site in February 2007 because of articles by Tunisian journalist Taoufik Ben Brik critical of President Zine el-Abidine Ben Ali appeared on the site.

Also blocked were Web sites that criticize Tunisia's human rights record. These include the web sites of:

- Amnesty International (www.amnesty.org)
- Freedom House (www.freedomhouse.org)
- Reporters Without Borders (www.rsf.org and www.rsf.fr)
- International Freedom of Expression eXchange (www.ifex.org)
- the Islamic Human Rights Commission (www.ihrc.org)
- the Arabic Network for Human Rights Information (www.hrinfo.org)

Although the home page of Human Rights Watch (HRW) was accessible, the Arabic and French versions of a Human Rights Watch report on Internet repression in Tunisia were blocked.

The prominent video sharing Web sites youtube.com and dailymotion.com were blocked, apparently because Tunisian activists used them to disseminate content critical of the regime's human rights practices. The Web site of the OpenNet Initiative (opennet.net), which researches and documents state filtering and censorship practices, was blocked. Also blocked was the Web site of Global Voices (globalvoices.org), a non-profit global citizens’ media project. Most of the tested sites in the anonymizers and circumvention tools category were also blocked. These include:

- Psiphon (https://web.archive.org/web/20080101102040/http://psiphon.civisec.org/)
- TOR (https://www.torproject.org/)
- Anonymizer (www.anonymizer.com)
- email privacy service provider Steal the Message (www.stealthmessage.com)
- Guardster (www.guardster.com/)
- JAP (anon.inf.tu-dresden.de)

The filtering regime pervasively filtered pornographic content, several gay and lesbian information or dating pages, and several online translation services. Also blocked were a few Web sites that criticize the Quran (thequran.com) and Islam (www.islameyat.com), though the small number points to limited filtering of religious content in Tunisia.

Starting in May 2010, the popular Skype VOIP application that is heavily used by Tunisian expats to stay in touch with their families went offline in Tunisia due to ATI's throttling of SIP traffic.

ATI's blocking of SIP traffic has made life very difficult for call centers, whose main business is taking calls to/from French speaking Europe. Most (if not all) call centers serving Europe used SIP, often with minutes bought from European (mostly French) providers. Blocking SIP traffic resulted in many job losses in Tunisia.

=== Surveillance during the Ben Ali regime ===
The Tunisian authorities practiced different sorts of Internet surveillance and request that service providers such as Internet cafés be partners in controlling Internet use. For example, the authorities monitored Internet cafés, required Internet users to show IDs before they could use the Internet in some regions, and held Internet café operators responsible for their clients’ online activities.

There was also technical surveillance where downloading or e-mail attachments went through a central server. In order to protect public order and national security, a 1998 post and telecommunications law allowed authorities to intercept and check the content of email messages. Filtering of e-mail messages of government opponents has been reported. Global Voices Advocacy Director and Tunisia Activist Sami Ben Gharbia conducted a test from the Netherlands with two Tunisia-based activists and confirmed by logging into their e-mail accounts from the Netherlands that what he saw was not what the activists saw when they logged in from Tunisia, and that they could not access all of the messages they received. In early 2011 there was increasing evidence that the private e-mail accounts of Tunisian citizens along with login details of their Facebook pages had been targeted by phishing scripts put in place by the government. There were increasing incidences of censorship in this manner as many dissidents were blocked from using the internet.

== Censorship following the Tunisian revolution ==
- In 2012 the OpenNet Initiative found no evidence of Internet filtering in the political, social, conflict/security, and Internet tools areas.
- In 2011 Reporters Without Borders listed Tunisia as "Under Surveillance".

The provisional government of national unity succeeded the government of President Zine El Abidine Ben Ali. The national unity government immediately proclaimed complete freedom of information and expression as a fundamental principle. On January 17, 2011, Internet censorship was immediately lifted, as President Ben Ali promised in his January 13 address. Some online controls remained in early February.

In May, the Permanent Military Tribunal of Tunis ordered four Facebook pages blocked for attempting "to damage the reputation of the military institution and its leaders". The Tribunal charged that publishing of video clips, the circulation of comments, and articles attempted to destabilize the trust of citizens in the national army, and to spread disorder and chaos in the country. Resurgence of Internet censorship lead to the resignation of blogger and political activist Slim Amamou from his post as Secretary of State for Youth and Sport on May 23.

On May 26, a court order forced the Tunisian Internet Agency (ATI) to block porn sites on the grounds that they pose a threat to minors and Muslim values. The ATI filed in opposition to block the order. ATI's application was rejected on June 13. The ATI began compliance in stages on June 15. On August 15, a Tunisian appeals court upheld the previous decisions requiring the ATI to block access to pornographic websites. The ATI appeal is undergoing an appeals process at the country's highest court, The ATI in opposition claimed that it cannot uphold the ruling because it lacks the financial and technical means to implement a sufficient filtering and censorship system.

Reporters Without Borders suggests that porn-site filtering could exacerbate reversals in recently lifted censorship policies. They contend that the provisional government's generalized and unspecific filtering infringes the principles of Network neutrality and violate promises made by the Tunisian High Commission for the Realization of Revolutionary Goals, Political Reforms, and Democratic Transition after the Revolution. The ATI's appeal is not yet complete.

Tunisia held elections on October 23, 2011, to create a post-revolution Constituent Assembly. Mongi Marzouk was appointed as Tunisia's Minister of Communication Technologies to the newly formed Jebali Cabinet on December 20, 2011. Marzouk's early political career demonstrated his will to maintain the provisional government's proclamation to freedom of information and expression. On September 4, 2012, at the National Forum on Internet Governance, Marzouk formally lifted Internet censorship in Tunisia and announced that Tunisia has seen the “end of Ammar 404,” a slang term referring to Tunisian Internet censorship at large. Two days later Tunisia attended the Freedom Online Conference in Nairobi, a platform for coalition members to further the agenda of Internet governance. During the conference, Tunisia officially became the third African member in the international coalition. Tunisia continued its promotion of uncensored Internet at the 2012 ICT4ALL Forum, September 17–20th in Hammamet. There, Marzouk declared that bilateral and multilateral discussions would resume in lieu of ICT4ALL's Forum policy recommendations for Tunisia's socio-economic development.

Cyber activists are skeptical of the new regime's policies. Sleh Edine Kchouk, President of the Tunisian Pirate Party, believes that continuous Internet monitoring and Ben Ali-era practices are still present. Following Marzouk's announcement to lift Internet censorship, Kchouk notes, “Tunisia has always embraced advanced technologies when it comes to the virtual world, in theory. But in practice, it’s completely different.” In September, the United Nations appealed to Tunisia to operationalize its freedom of expression and information policies with respect to the media. Despite the country's latest Internet policy reforms, censorship is allegedly enacted upon media activists that fail to comply with Jebali Cabinet member's ideals of Tunisian “tradition” and “culture.”

== See also ==
- Decree Law 54 (Tunisia)
- Tunisia Monitoring Group of the International Freedom of Expression Exchange (IFEX-TMG)
- Internet censorship
- Freedom of Expression
