= GIFC =

GIFC may refer to:

- Geylang International FC, a professional football club based in Bedok, Singapore
- Global Internet Freedom Consortium, a consortium of organizations that develop and deploy anti-censorship technologies for use by Internet users
