= Internet in Azerbaijan =

Internet in Azerbaijan is vulnerable to government monitoring and censorship. The ruling Aliyev family owns two of the three largest mobile operators in Azerbaijan. The ownership of the third large mobile operator is unknown, as it registered to an offshore company. The authoritarian regime in Azerbaijan has a history of blocking websites that criticize the government.

According to the government, 85% of the population was online in 2013.

== Internet penetration and Internet Service Providers (ISPs) ==
During the Soviet era, Azerbaijan was a major center for IT development, especially regarding process control systems. This legacy left the country with a reasonably large and well-developed technical infrastructure, including several research institutes and a political leadership savvy about the importance of the ICT sector. Internet development is following the pattern typical of many developing countries, with access centered on major cities, particularly the capital city, Baku. The number of Internet users has grown over the last several years to 3.7 million users, or 44 percent of the population, as of June 2010, estimated by the International Telecommunication Union.

Many Azerbaijanis access the Internet from shared connections, such as their place of work or study, or from Internet cafés (with the latter providing access for 19 percent of users in 2007). The rate of ownership of computers is low (2.4 units per 100 inhabitants), and Internet usage in homes is moderate, accounting for 41.6 percent of the total usage for 2007, up from 36.4 percent in 2006. For connectivity, some individual subscribers rely on mobile telephony, though access remains expensive, with most using dial-up services as their primary means. Official survey results for 2007 indicate that economic and educational barriers are the main contributing factors for these low figures, with 31.4 percent blaming the high cost of computer equipment and 21.8 percent indicating a lack of necessary skills.

The cost of Internet service is steadily decreasing: as of 2010, monthly unlimited ADSL connection of 1 Mbit/s cost around US$20–25 per month. While the cost of international traffic has gone down over the last several years, the cost for usage of the local infrastructure remains unchanged. Approximately 50 percent of the expenses of small ISPs are local connection costs paid to the state-owned company controlling the market. Because these expenses are the same for all providers, they agreed among themselves to charge end users the same price for unlimited monthly dial-up service. Larger providers temporarily blocked the ISPs that tried to contravene the concerted practice. In December 2007, for example, two small providers—SuperOnline and AvirTel —were blocked by local ISPs (Adanet and IntraNS) while trying to provide service at a lower price for customers. Shortly after the providers agreed to bring the price of their services into line, the block was lifted. For similar reasons, the larger ISPs blocked another smaller local ISP, Azeronline.

In Azerbaijan, fixed-line telephony is largely centralized in the hands of the state-owned telecom provider AzTelecom, which also acts as a commercial ISP. Delta Telecom (previously operating as AzerSat) is the main ISP in the country, supplying international connectivity to at least 90–95 percent of all users. Delta Telecom also owns the Internet international gateway and sells international traffic to almost all ISPs. The nonprofit AZNET/AZRENA project provides connectivity to the educational and research community and benefits from a satellite channel built under NATO's "Silk Road" project. AzEuroTel started commercial activity as a telecommunications company and thus managed to establish a relatively wide network infrastructure. AzEuroTel and Adanet also have satellite channels to Russia. AzerOnline, which is funded predominantly by the largest mobile operator, Azercell, has an additional satellite connection to Turkey. The cost of satellite connection is very high because of the monopoly regime set by the MCIT.

Since the second half of 2007, Azerbaijan has not had a free Internet Exchange Point (IXP). Delta Telecom controls the only IXP, and charges the same amount for local and international traffic. Providers have not been able to agree on setting up another IXP. The external traffic of Azerbaijan is now 6 Gbit/s, which is a notable increase from the 155 Mbit/s capacity of 2006. Delta Telecom has external fiber optic connections with Russia via TransTelekom and with Turkey via Rostelecom (Indirectly, Delta Telecom serves Georgian users because a local ISP, TransEuroCom, buys international traffic from Delta and carries it by fiber to Georgia. Through the TRACECA Fiber Optic Cable line, TransEuroCom is connected also to the TurkTelecom in Turkey. State control over domain name registration is limited. The assignment of the country code domain name ".az" is controlled by AzNic, Ltd., a joint venture among three Azerbaijani firms. The cost for a one-year registration is US$34. Network Technologies (a subsidiary of IntraNS) is the company that carries out registration and administration of the top-level domain (TLD) in the country. Domain name registrations cannot be done online. Instead, a client is required in most cases to go in person to the offices of the domain name holder. Since 2002, the number of registered domain names has rapidly increased, with approximately 3,000 first-level and more than 6,000 second-level domains registered under the .az TLD.

Mobile telephony is increasingly popular among the younger population. This is especially true in rural areas, where the fixed-line infrastructure is poor and people are increasingly subscribing to mobile services. The major mobile operator in the country is Azercell, with more than 35 percent MCIT participation. Bakcell, the second operator, is relatively small. Azercell recently started offering mobile e-mail services. Both operators provide coverage across all Azerbaijani territory (except the territory of Nagorno-Karabakh). In March 2006, the MCIT agreed to grant a license to a third GSM operator, Azerphone. Catel started operation earlier. The state telecom, AzTelecom, has participation in the two new mobile operators. Azercell, Bakcell, and Azerphone provide WAP and GRPS services. Mobile providers also use Delta Telecom's external channel for Internet.

== Legal and regulatory frameworks ==
Even though Azerbaijan made telecommunications and Internet national development priorities, the telecom regulatory framework remains insufficiently developed. The MCIT acts as both regulator and operator. In 2008, the MCIT moved to separate the two functions but has not yet completed this process. Some telecommunications services must be licensed, including VoIP.

The major public telecom operators are the government-owned AzTelecom, Azeronline, IntraNS, Adanet, and AzEuroTel (50 percent owned by the MCIT and 50 percent by a British company). Around half of the telephone lines in Azerbaijan are analog, and more than 85 percent of the main lines are in urban areas. The MCIT has adopted a program for development of telecommunications aimed at modernizing the telecommunications infrastructure.

Under foreign pressure, the government has taken steps to liberalize the ISP market. Compulsory state licensing for ISPs was eliminated in 2002, although the MCIT has continued to ignore this provision on isolated occasions. The MCIT continues to hold about a 50 percent share in a few of the leading ISPs in Azerbaijan. Azerbaijan applied for World Trade Organization (WTO) membership in 1997, and even though some progress in liberalization of services was made, the country still remains on the accession agenda. It has been suggested that there is not enough political will to join the WTO, mainly because local businesses fear the loss of their advantageous position in the internal market.

From a regulatory perspective, the Internet is treated as mass media, and is included on the list of telecommunications services regulated by the 2005 Law on Telecommunications. Azerbaijani law does not provide for mandatory filtering or monitoring of Internet content. However, as Web sites that criticize governmental policies have emerged, the government has considered introducing a law that will impose restrictions on Web sites with obscene or unpatriotic content, thereby strengthening already existing defamation laws. Content filtering is practiced by AZNET, the education and research ISP, but is regulated by an accepted usage policy and is restricted to filtering out pornographic content. Anecdotal accounts claim that filtering of specific Web sites occurs, which is seemingly the result of informal requests to ISP managers by state officials from the Ministry of National Security (MCIT), or the presidency.

YouTube is also becoming increasingly popular among Azerbaijani Internet users. Several youth groups post videos online, and are using YouTube as a platform to communicate with other members or members of the public. The popularity of the multimedia site prompted the head of the National Council on TV and Radio Broadcasting of Azerbaijan, Nushirevan Magerramli, to announce the government's intention to regulate Internet TV and Internet radio.

The Telecommunications Act is expected to prohibit the same legal entity from merging more than three publications under one TV and radio company. In 2007, the government announced that in some regions of the country, TV signals from neighboring Armenia and Iran are stronger than the national TV broadcast. As a result, the National Television and Radio Council ordered a discontinuation of the broadcast of Russian and Turkish TV stations on Azerbaijani territory. In October 2008, the council announced its decision to suspend the licenses of some international radio channels, such as the BBC, Radio Liberty, and others.

Azerbaijani defamation legislation has been a frequent subject of criticism by the international human rights community. The government has been under pressure to decriminalize libel, especially after prosecution against journalists and bloggers has intensified. For example, Eynulla Fatullayev, the editor of Azerbaijan's largest independent newspaper and an outspoken critic of the government, was sentenced to eight years and six months in prison on charges of terrorism and inciting ethnic hatred. Fatullayev was sentenced earlier during the same year under the criminal libel provision to 30 months in prison for a posting attributed to him that blamed the Azerbaijani government for one of the massacres in the first Nagorno-Karabakh War in 1992. Fatullayev denied writing the posting and argued that the charges were politically motivated. This case stirred massive protests in the country against the editor's conviction. The authorities shut down the publications in which Fatullayev participated. The hard disk drives of the computers of these publications were also seized. Another recent case shows that the government has exercised pressure on ISPs to take down specific Internet content. Sensitive videos considered offensive to Azerbaijani national feelings were uploaded online to cause a massive uproar in society. In response, the Ministry of Foreign Affairs sent an official letter to the ISP to express its disapproval and have the videos removed.

== Filtering, surveillance, and harassment ==
As of 2014, Freedom House reports the Azerbaijani government does not engage in systematic filtering or blocking of the Internet. There are numerous reports of temporary issues with accessing some websites during protests in parts of the country. Freedom House ranked Azerbaijan as partially free, noting that the social media sites are blocked, political websites are blocked, and bloggers and journalists are arrested.

=== Filtering ===
In 2007 and 2008, the OpenNet Initiative tested for content filtering on AzNet, DeltaTelecom, AzerOnline, and AzEuroTel, as well as several end user locations (such as Internet cafés). Most of the ISPs in the country purchase international traffic from Delta Telecom and utilize the infrastructure of AzTelecom for local traffic. It appears that most of the filtering occurs on Delta Telecom lines. The ONI found reverse filtering on a number of U.S. military sites.

Another case followed the rapid increase of the price of petrol, gas, and electricity in the country in January 2007. The author of http://www.susmayaq.biz published a protest letter to the president online. As a result, the author was arrested, and that Web site was inaccessible on ten Azerbaijani ISPs from January to March 2007. After a protest by youth organizations, the author was released without charges.

Evidence of second-generation controls was also evident in the run-up to the 2008 parliamentary elections. The political section of the most popular online forum (http://www.day.az/forum) in Azerbaijan was removed around 20 days before the elections and was still inactive as of May 2009.

The popular opposition blog Tinsohbeti.com was blocked in March 2008 after it published an article detailing political and economic problems in Azerbaijan. In 2006, the same Web site was blocked because it posted satirical cartoons of the president. Before presidential elections in October 2008, the Web site was unblocked, but by then the original domain registration had expired and no longer hosted the opposition blog.

At Internet cafés, many owners impose restrictions that prevent users from downloading large attachments and visiting certain pornographic sites. These policies are not universal, and they are implemented at the discretion of café owners.

At businesses, most employers limit access to the Internet through the use of intelligent firewalls that restrict the downloading of files with certain extensions (.mp3, .avi, .mpg, .mov, etc.), as well as access to storage file servers and to the servers of instant messaging clients such as ICQ, MSN, Skype, and others.

On May 12, 2017, after independent opposition news sites were blocked in Azerbaijan, all calls via the Internet, including messengers such as Skype and WhatsApp, were blocked entirely (or as limited as possible in terms of speed of access to services). At the same time, no official statements were made by the government of the Republic.

On September 27, 2020, due to the armed conflict in Nagorno-Karabakh, the "Ministry of transport, communications and high technologies of Azerbaijan" imposed restrictions on the use of the Internet in the country. Telegram, Facebook, WhatsApp, YouTube, Instagram, TikTok, LinkedIn, Twitter, Zoom, Skype were completely blocked. Many other unrelated services were also blocked due to lack of coordination.

=== Surveillance ===
Azerbaijani law does not include a formal legal foundation requiring Internet surveillance. Nevertheless, surveillance does occur, mainly by means of sporadic visits of State Security Services to ISPs. In 2000–2001, there was an unsuccessful attempt to adopt the Russian SORM-II model for Internet surveillance, but the project was interrupted because of financial difficulties and opposition from ISPs and the Internet community.

In order to deal with cyber attacks, the MCIT is planning to establish a council dealing with Internet-related problems. The Azerbaijani Internet community is hoping that the proposed council will be able to decrease cyber security risks without undermining the privacy of users. Another recent MCIT initiative is the launch of an Internet antihackers agency.

=== Harassment ===
Activists and journalists who post critical content about the government have been arrested. In 2014, eight activists from the N!DA and Free Youth movements were arrested for organizing online protests in 2013, eventually receiving jail sentences ranging from six to eight years.

Cases of blogger and journalists arrests in Azerbaijan abound. The editor in chief of the online news outlet Azadxeber.net was sentenced to 10 years in prison in 2013. The charges included the distribution of religious literature, making public calls to overthrow the constitutional regime, and incitement of ethnic hatred.

Hilal Mammadov, a human rights defender and editor of the newspaper Tolishi Sado, was arrested on June 21, 2012, and sentenced to 5 years in prison after he shared a popular video on YouTube entitled “Ti kto takoy, davay dosvidaniya!” (Who are you? See you, goodbye!). Mammadov posted a comment under the video stating that it had made Azerbaijan more popular than the government had been able to in their efforts regarding the Eurovision Song Contest. He was arrested soon after, and charged with illegal drug possession, treason, and incitement to national, racial, social and religious hatred and hostility.

There are several reported cases of people arrested because of content posted online. The author of the Web site http://www.pur.gen.az, infamous for its biting humorous content, posted a caricature of the president of Azerbaijan in 2006. In 2007, the Ministry of National Security searched one of the Internet cafés in Baku and discovered this caricature on the cache page. The author and the webmaster of the site, as well as several café guests, were arrested and indicted for organized criminal activities. The individuals were released several days later, but the Web site was shut down by its owners in order to avoid further prosecution.

The Nakhchivan Autonomous Republic, an exclave of Azerbaijan, closed down Internet cafés for several days in March 2008, according to the Azerbaijani press. The reasons behind the ban remain unclear, but restrictive policies on seeking and distributing information in the republic are not isolated cases. At the end of 2008, a number of Web sites were locally blocked in Nakhchivan. In 2013, the government again shut down the majority of Internet cafés in the Nakhchivan region, and café owners reported that orders to shut down came from the Ministry of Communications and Information Technology of Nakhchivan.

The ongoing cyberwar between Azerbaijani and Armenian hackers has also caused disruptions to some websites and ISPs. In early 2007, five Armenian websites were inaccessible, and users were shown a block page commenting on the political affiliation of the Nagorno-Karabakh region. At the same time, the Web site of the Azerbaijani Public Television ITV was taken down. Since most of the allegedly inaccessible sites contained oppositional political content, there are allegations that the Azerbaijani government was involved in the attacks. However, ONI testing could not confirm these suspicions. The ONI did not test for political issues related to the proclaimed independence of the Nagorno-Karabakh region.
