= CIRCAMP =

European Police Chiefs Task Force initiative against child pornography

The Cospol Internet Related Child Abusive Material Project (CIRCAMP) is a Comprehensive Operational Strategic Planning for the Police (COSPOL) project aimed at combating borderless and multinational crime in Europe. COSPOL is initiated by the European Police Chiefs Task Force (EPCTF), a council of the national heads of police in Europe.

CIRCAMP is aimed at the commercial and organized distribution of child pornography.

== Participants ==
CIRCAMP has 14 national police forces as members, in addition to analytical and operational support from Europol and Interpol. CIRCAMP was co-funded by the European Commission Safer Internet Programme.

The participating countries are Norway (Driver/Project manager), UK (Co-driver), Ireland, France, Sweden, Italy, Finland, Belgium, Spain, Malta, Denmark, The Netherlands, Poland, and Germany.

== Aims ==
One of the major ongoing tasks within CIRCAMP is the implementation and further spread of CSAADF, The Child Sexual Abuse Anti Distribution Filter. This is an access blocking methodology targeting only web domains that contain child sexual abusive files.

The primary aims of domain-based filtering and displaying a STOP page on the computer or mobile device of an Internet user accessing a web site with child abuse content are:

- To prevent the re-victimization of those children who are or have been the victim of abuse.
- To prevent accidental access to this illegal and harmful content by the public.
- To prevent deliberate access to child abuse material on the Internet.
- To reduce the customer base of these illegal websites with the assistance of participating Internet Service Providers ISP.

== Arguments against stated aims ==
It is questionable whether the prevention of re-victimization is a valid aim, as blocking leaves the website online and available for view from people who circumvent the block and who are outside the jurisdiction. There is no empirical evidence to suggest that accidental access is reduced to a significant degree by web blocking. Web blocking is very easy to circumvent, so deliberate access is not prevented by web blocking. There is no conclusive evidence to show to what degree this goal is achieved. Evidence from a project run by the UK police suggests that commercial websites are in significant decline. Still, websites provided by persons with a sexual interest in children or for other reasons have shown little or no decline. Therefore, the number of new websites entered onto the Internet has been reduced, but the problem persists.

== Evaluating sites for CSAADF ==
The police in the member countries, which already have an access blocking system in place, are able to evaluate the content of websites against the national legislation. These websites are found in investigations, exchanged with other law enforcement agencies, or received as tips from hotlines. If the content is found to be illegal to download, possess, or distribute in said country, their domain or URS is added to the list of blocked addresses. The ISPs will then, either by agreement with the police or their obligation by the law, redirect the traffic to another server and display a STOP page. This STOP page will explain the reason for the redirection of traffic, give links to legislation and ways to contact the police where they can contest the blocking.

The access blocking of child sexual abuse websites is purely preventive and no investigations against persons are started as a result of redirected Internet traffic, nor is any identifiable information about the Internet user stored.

== Cooperation ==
Although CIRCAMP is a European/Europol police project, they are also cooperating with countries outside of the EU, such as Norway, Switzerland, and New Zealand. The international nature of the Internet demands that policing has an international approach while remaining in accordance with national legislation. CIRCAMP is supporting and cooperating with INTERPOL in its effort to provide ISP and other providers of services on the Internet with a "Worst of" list of domains containing child sexual abuse material. The work of CIRCAMP countries is essential in the quality control of the INTERPOL list, as specialist national police units on child sexual abuse participate.

CIRCAMP is also cooperating in the cross-border commercial exploitation of children in more traditional investigations, and are planning to initiate international investigations against commercial procurers of such material with the aim of blocking the payment possibilities and investigating the persons within these organizations.
