= Internet censorship in France =

There is medium internet censorship in France, including limited filtering of child pornography, laws against websites that promote terrorism or racial hatred, and attempts to protect copyright. The "Freedom on the Net" report by Freedom House has consistently listed France as a country with Internet freedom. Its global ranking was 6 in 2013 and 12 in 2017. A sharp decline in its score, second only to Libya was noted in 2015 and attributed to "problematic policies adopted in the aftermath of the Charlie Hebdo terrorist attack, such as restrictions on content that could be seen as 'apology for terrorism,' prosecutions of users, and significantly increased surveillance."

== Overview ==
France continues to promote freedom of the press and speech online by allowing unfiltered access to most content, apart from limited filtering of child pornography and web sites that promote terrorism, or racial violence and hatred. The French government has undertaken numerous measures to protect the rights of Internet users, including the passage of the Loi pour la Confiance dans l’Économie Numérique (LCEN, Law for Trust in the Digital Economy) in 2004. However, the passage of a new copyright law threatening to ban users from the Internet upon their third violation has drawn much criticism from privacy advocates as well as the European Union (EU) parliament.

In November 2010, France was classified by the OpenNet Initiative as showing no evidence of Internet filtering in any of the four areas monitored (political, social, conflict/security, and Internet tools)

However, with the implementation of the "three-strikes" legislation and a law providing for the administrative filtering of the web and the defense of a "civilized" Internet, 2010 was a difficult year for Internet freedom in France. The offices of several online media firms and their journalists were targeted for break-ins and court summons and pressured to identify their sources. As a result, France has been added to Reporters Without Borders list of "Countries Under Surveillance".

As of 2013, controversial clauses within the HADOPI, LOPPSI 2, and LCEN laws were provoking the ire of Internet advocates in the country, mainly over fears of disproportionate punishments for copyright violators, overreaching administrative censorship, and threats to privacy. However, Freedom House ranks France amongst the top 12 countries for Internet freedom.

== LICRA vs. Yahoo ==
In 2000, French courts demanded Yahoo! block Nazi material in the case LICRA vs. Yahoo. In 2001, a U.S. District Court Judge held that Yahoo cannot be forced to comply with French laws against the expression of pro-Nazi and anti-Semitic views, because doing so would violate its right to free expression under the First Amendment of the U.S. Constitution. In 2006, a U.S. Court of Appeals reversed the District Court, finding either a lack of jurisdiction or an inability to enforce its order in France and the U.S. Supreme Court refused to consider an appeal.

== Hadopi laws ==
The Hadopi law, enacted in 2009, allows disconnecting from the Internet users that have been caught illegally downloading copyrighted content, or failing to secure their system against such illegal downloads; as of August 2009, this law is to be supplemented by a Hadopi2 law. The LOPPSI 2 law, brought before Parliament in 2009, will authorize a blacklist of sites providing child pornography, established by the Ministry of the Interior, which Internet service providers will have to block. The Loppsi "Bill on direction and planning for the performance of domestic security" is a far-reaching security bill that seeks to modernise Internet laws, criminalising online identity theft, allowing police to tap Internet connections as well as phone lines during investigations and targeting child pornography by ordering ISPs to filter Internet connections.

In 2010, French parliament opposed all the amendments seeking to minimise the use of filtering Internet sites. This move has stirred controversy throughout French society, as the Internet filtering intended to catch child pornographers could also be extended to censor other material.

Critics also warn that filtering URLs will have no effect, as distributors of child pornography and other materials are already using encrypted peer-to-peer systems to deliver their wares.

In 2011 the Constitutional Council of France validated Article 4 of the LOPPSI 2 law, thereby allowing filtering the Internet without any justice decision. The filtered sites blacklist being under the control of an administrative authority depending directly from the Ministry of the Interior without any independent monitoring.

On 21 April 2011, the Hadopi announced they planned integrating a spyware called "securization software" in the French Internet Service Providers provided modem-routers with the explicit goal of tracking any communication including private correspondence and instant messengers exchanges.

== June 2011: Draft executive order implementing the Law for Trust in the Digital Economy ==
A June 2011 draft executive order implementing Article 18 of the Law for Trust in the Digital Economy (LCEN) would give several French government ministries the power to restrict online content "in case of violation, or where there is a serious risk of violation, of the maintenance of public order, the protection of minors, the protection of public health, the preservation of interests of the national defense, or the protection of physical persons." According to Félix Tréguer, a Policy and Legal Analyst for the digital rights advocacy group La Quadrature du Net, this is "a censorship power over the Internet that is probably unrivaled in the democratic world." In response to criticism, on 23 June 2011 the minister for the Industry and the Digital economy, Éric Besson, announced that the Government would rewrite the order, possibly calling for a judge to review the legality of the content and the proportionality of the measures to be taken. Any executive order has to be approved by the French Council of State, which will have to decide whether Internet censorship authorization can be extended to such an extent by a mere executive order. In 2013, the Parliament eventually repealed the legislative provision on which the decree was based.

== October 2011: Cop-watching site blocked ==
On 14 October 2011 a French court ordered French Internet service providers to block the Copwatch Nord Paris I-D-F website. The website shows pictures and videos of police officers arresting suspects, taunting protesters and allegedly committing acts of violence against members of ethnic minorities. The police said they were particularly concerned about portions of the site showing identifiable photos of police officers, along with personal data, that could lead to violence against the local authorities. However, free speech advocates reacted with alarm. "This court order illustrates an obvious will by the French government to control and censor citizens’ new online public sphere," said Jérémie Zimmermann, spokesman for La Quadrature du Net, a Paris-based organization that campaigns against restrictions on the Internet.

== Twitter case ==
Following the posting of an antisemitic and racists posts by anonymous users, Twitter removed those posts from its service. Lawsuits were filed by the Union of Jewish Students (UEJF), a French advocacy group and, on 24 January 2013, Judge Anne-Marie Sauteraud ordered Twitter to divulge the Personally identifiable information about the user who posted the antisemitic post, charging that the posts violated French laws against hate speech. Twitter responded by saying that it was "reviewing its options" regarding the French charges. Twitter was given two weeks to comply with the court order before daily fines of €1,000 (about US$1,300) would be assessed. Issues over jurisdiction arise, because Twitter has no offices nor employees within France, so it is unclear how a French court could sanction Twitter.

== Pierre-sur-Haute article deletion ==
The French Intelligence Agency General Directorate for Internal Security (DCRI) contacted the Wikimedia Foundation, who refused to remove a French Wikipedia article about the Military radio station of Pierre-sur-Haute because the article only contained publicly available information, in accordance with Wikipedia's verifiability policy. In April 2013 DCRI forced the deletion of the article when it summoned Rémi Mathis, a Wikipedia volunteer with administrator's access to the French language Wikipedia and ordered him to take down the article that had been online since 2009. DCRI claimed the article contained classified military information and broke French law. Mathis, who had no connection with the article, explained "that's not how Wikipedia works" and told them he had no right to interfere with editorial content, but was told he would be held in custody and charged if he failed to comply. The article was subsequently restored by a Swiss Wikipedia contributor. The article became the most viewed page on the French Wikipedia as of April 6, 2013. Christophe Henner, vice-president of Wikimedia France, said "if the DCRI comes up with the necessary legal papers we will take down the page. We have absolutely no problem with that and have made it a point of honour to respect legal injunctions; it's the method the DCRI used that is shocking." The Wikimedia Foundation issued a communiqué in response.

== Blocking of sixteen streaming websites in November 2013 ==
On 28 November 2013, the civil court of first instance of Paris ordered French internet service providers to block 16 video streaming websites for copyright infringement: dpstream.tv, fifostream.tv, allostreaming.com, alloshowtv.com, allomovies.com, alloshare.com, allomegavideo.com, alloseven.com, allourls.com, fifostream.com, fifostream.net, fifostream.org, fifostreaming.com, fifostreaming.net, fifostreaming.org and fifostreaming.tv

== Blocking of ten websites in March 2015 ==
On March 16, the interior ministry announced that French ISPs would have to censor the five pro-jihadist websites alhayatmedia.wordpress.com, jihadmin.com, mujahida89.wordpress.com, is0lamanation.blogspot.fr and islamic-news.info in addition to five pedophile websites in the next 24 hours.

== Blocking of Sci-Hub and LibGen on 7 March 2019 ==
According to the Tribunal de Grande Instance (TGI) in Paris, the publishers have given enough evidence that the Sci-Hub and LibGen platforms are wholly or partially committed to the piracy of their articles.

== 2020 hate speech legislation ==
On 13 May 2020, the National Assembly passed "Lutte contre la haine sur internet" ("Fighting hate on the internet") by a margin of 355 votes in favor, 150 against, and 47 abstaining. The legislation requires that social media sites operating in France be required to remove offending content within 24 hours of notification, or face an initial fine up to €1.25 million. Continuous and repeated offenses could lead to fines up to 4% of global revenue. Specific illegal content related to child pornography and terrorism is required to be removed within 1 hour of being flagged. Such providers can prematurely remove content before it is flagged as well without penalty. In addition to these provision, additional regulations related to hate speech, including requiring service providers to block access to sites that mirror whole or in part sites with hate speech content. The law is similar to Germany's Network Enforcement Act, which was passed in 2017. While the EU had asked France to hold off on passage of the laws until it had completed the Union's own Digital Services Act, France had gone forward with their own version due to their stronger laws against hate speech.

The regulation raised consider about the potential for misuse to censor valid criticism and commentary of topics that are related to those deemed illegal, and thus used as a politic tool. La Quadrature du Net stated that previous laws allowing French police to ask for the removal of terrorist content had already been abused to censor political content, even prior to the new regulation.

== See also ==
- Censorship in France
- Internet Censorship
