= GWI (company) =

Market research company

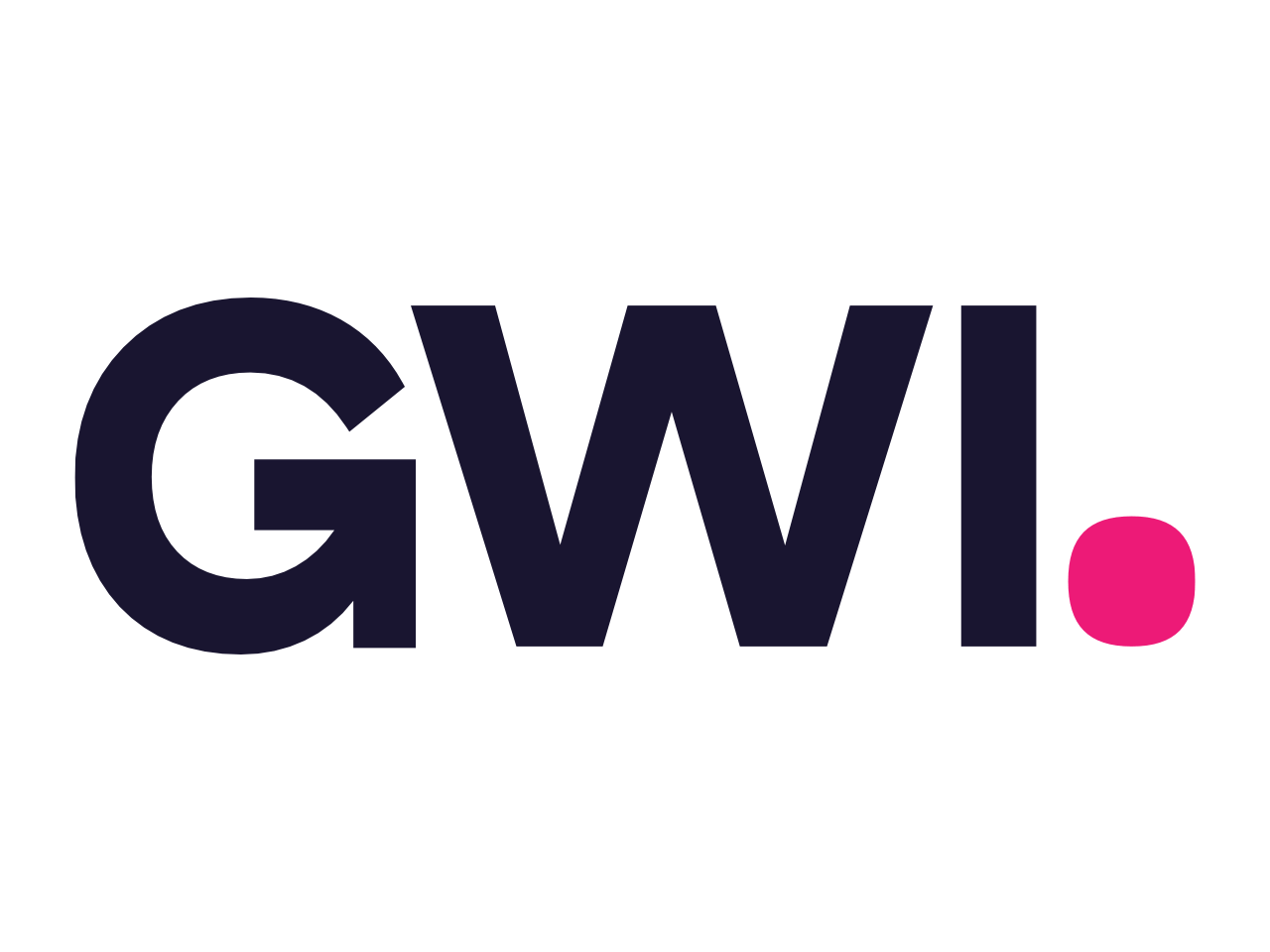
- Company type: Private
- Industry: Market research, advertising, technology, audience targeting
- Founded: 2009
- Founder: Thomas C. Smith
- Headquarters: London
- Number of locations: 5 offices
- Area served: Worldwide
- Key people: Thomas C. Smith (Founder & CEO); James Scott (Chief Revenue Officer); Bex Campbell (Chief Product Officer)
- Services: Research and consulting
- Owner: Trendstream Limited
- Website: www.gwi.com

GWI (formerly GlobalWebIndex) is an audience research company founded by Tom Smith in 2009. The company provides audience insight to publishers, media agencies and marketers around the world. GWI profiles consumers across 48+ countries with a panel representing over 2.7 billion digital consumers, making insights available through a subscription-based platform.

== History ==
In October 2012, GWI surprised social media analysts and commentators by claiming that Twitter and Facebook had big followings in China and Vietnam (later lift the ban on Facebook) – countries where those social networks are blocked by their respective governments. The story was picked up by various news outlets including Huffington Post, Bloomberg, and the Financial Times, where the rise of VPN has been attributed as the primary enabler for Chinese internet users circumventing website blocks. Almost a decade after the company was founded, and with customers including Google, Spotify, WPP and Omnicom Group, it closed its first round of series A funding in 2018. The company claims to have raised $180M series B funding in February 2022, and was valued at $850M.

== Data Sources ==
GWI combines survey data from millions of panelists with advanced analytics and data science to provide professionals with audience insight. The platform collects data in demographics, online behavior, device access, media consumption, social media, and marketing touch points – after which it presents data through charts and dashboards.

=== GWI Core ===
Core is the ongoing GWI research study, which interviews internet users across the world, over four waves of research each year. Each respondent is questioned in detail, resulting in 200,000+ profiling points across the platform for consumer research.

In 2017, brand data was added. When launched, it provided insight into over 4,000+ tracked brands and can be used against the profiling points of the GWI Core data set.

=== GWI Work ===
In 2019, GWI launched its first ever B2B data set, which analyses the behaviours and attitudes of working professionals. Using a dedicated panel of 17,000+ respondents, its first report using the research was produced in collaboration with Slack Technologies Inc.

=== Custom research ===
GWI's custom research is claimed to be used by marketers and advertisers to run customized surveys and projects using their panel of global consumers, giving them access to data tailored to their target audience. The range of services offered through its custom arm include website and campaign analytics, brand tracking, concept testing, and ad effectiveness studies.
