= Global Internet Freedom Consortium =

The Global Internet Freedom Consortium is a consortium of organizations that develop and deploy anti-censorship technologies for use by Internet users in countries whose governments restrict Web-based information access. The organization was reportedly begun in 2001 by Chinese-born scientists living in the United States reacting against Chinese government oppression of the Falun Gong.

== Products ==
The main products are Freegate and Ultrasurf.

== Funding ==
The organization states that the majority of its funding comes from its members. In May 2010, the group was offered a US$1.5 million grant from the United States Department of State. This move received criticism from representatives of the Chinese government.

== See also ==
- Human rights in the People's Republic of China
- Internet censorship
- Internet censorship in the People's Republic of China
- Political repression of cyber-dissidents
