= Internet shutdowns in Sudan =

Recurrent internet disruptions in Sudan amid civil war

Internet Shutdowns in Sudan
- Location: Sudan
- Cause: Sudanese civil war between Sudanese Armed Forces and Rapid Support Forces
- Outcome: Persistent connectivity disruptions; humanitarian crisis exacerbation

The Internet shutdowns in Sudan refer to a series of nationwide and localised disruptions to internet and telecommunications services in Sudan since the onset of the civil war in April 2023 between the Sudanese Armed Forces (SAF) and the Rapid Support Forces (RSF). In November 2025, Sudan recorded at least four major shutdowns in the year, contributing to its status as one of Africa's most disrupted digital environments.

== Background ==
Sudan's telecommunications sector, which relied on three major providers (Zain Sudan, Sudani, and MTN Sudan), has been repeatedly targeted amid the conflict. Both SAF and RSF have destroyed fibre optic cables and telecom towers to hinder enemy communications and civilian coordination. Also, there have been pre-war precedents which include a 37-day nationwide blackout in 2019 during protests and a 25-day cut in 2021.

== Events in 2025 ==
=== January: Wad Madani Internet Restoration ===
A year-long blackout in Wad Madani (Gezira State), imposed after RSF capture in December 2023, was partially lifted in January 2025 when the SAF recapture the city. However, intermittent service persisted due to RSF control and high costs for satellite alternatives like Starlink

=== July: WhatsApp Restrictions ===
On 25 July 2025, the Sudanese Telecommunications and Post Regulatory Authority (TPRA) suspended WhatsApp voice and video calls nationwide, citing "security concerns." Text and group messaging remained operational, but AccessNow has reported that the ban isolated civilians, disrupted health information for women and girls, and hindered gender-based violence reporting.

=== September: Exam and Business Disruptions ===
Four mobile internet shutdowns occurred during university exams from 7–10 July 2025 with each lasting for about three hours. By late September, fibre optic disruptions halted travel bookings, education platforms, and business operations, which also affected fixed and mobile lines alike.

=== November: Starlink Blackout ===
A two-day nationwide Starlink blackout began on 8–9 November 2025, amid intensified fighting in Kordofan and El Fasher. Authorities restored access on 9 November, enabling contact with expatriates and aid coordination. Starlink, introduced in 2024, has become vital but faces black market pricing and RSF exploitation.
