= Internet censorship in Germany =

Internet censorship in Germany is practised directly and indirectly through various laws and court decisions. German law provides for freedom of speech and press with several exceptions, including what The Guardian has called "some of the world's toughest laws around hate speech". An example of content censored by law is the removal of web sites from Google search results that deny the holocaust, which is a felony under German law. The German government requests the second most user data worldwide after the United States.

Most cases of Internet censorship in Germany occur after state court rulings. One example is a 2009 court order, forbidding German Wikipedia from disclosing the identity of Wolfgang Werlé and Manfred Lauber, two criminals convicted of the murder of the Bavarian actor Walter Sedlmayr. In another case, Wikipedia.de (an Internet domain run by Wikimedia Deutschland) was prohibited from pointing to the actual Wikipedia content. The court order was as a temporary injunction in a case filed by politician Lutz Heilmann over claims in a German Wikipedia article regarding his past involvement with the former German Democratic Republic's intelligence service Stasi.

The first known case of Internet censorship in Germany occurred in 1996, when the Verein zur Förderung eines Deutschen Forschungsnetzes banned some IP addresses from Internet access.

== Relevant laws ==
=== Access Impediment Act ===
In June 2009, the Bundestag passed the Access Impediment Act or Zugangserschwerungsgesetz that introduced Internet blocking of sites found to distribute child pornography. Against the backdrop of an intense political debate, the law did not come into force until federal elections in September 2009 changed the setup of the governing coalition. In talks between the new governing parties CDU and FDP, it was agreed that no blocking would be implemented for one year, focusing on take-down efforts instead. After one year the success of the deletion policy would be reviewed. The governing parties ultimately decided in April 2011 to repeal the law altogether.

=== Ancillary copyright for press publishers ===
After lobbying efforts by news publishers which began in 2009, the Bundesrat considered a law preventing search results from returning excerpts from news sites unless the search engine has paid a license for them. It passed in 2013 and was widely interpreted as an attempt to have Google subsidize German news. In response, Google modified search to only display headlines for certain sites. The publishing collective VG Media claimed in an unsuccessful lawsuit that removing the snippets rather than licensing them was an antitrust violation. Other supporters of the bill, including Axel Springer, saw an overall decrease in their readership following its passage.

=== Network Enforcement Act ===
The Netzwerkdurchsetzungsgesetz or NetzDG was passed in June 2017 as a measure to require social media companies in Germany to censor extremism online, with significant hate speech provisions as well. The law, which applies to for-profit websites with over 2 million users, demands the removal of offensive illegal content within 24 hours and allows for one week to review "more legally ambiguous content". It was authored by Heiko Maas and went into full effect in January 2018.

Critics have questioned the feasibility of fining companies €50 million for failing to comply, and pointed to hundreds of new German content moderators hired by Facebook. A report testing the amount of illegal content that could be removed within 24 hours found figures of 90% for YouTube, 39% for Facebook and 1% for Twitter. Purveyors of satire also criticized the law after the magazine Titanic and the comedian Sophie Passmann were both suspended from Twitter after attempting to mock anti-Muslim rhetoric. The United Nations special rapporteur on freedom of expression David Kaye expressed a fear that NetzDG would lead to overly restrictive blocking and Cathleen Berger of Mozilla found evidence that it was inspiring other countries to do the same. Some victims of harassment campaigns have supported increased restrictions and stated "I don't mind if other comments get deleted along with the bad ones."

Opposition politicians including Nicola Beer of the FDP, Simone Peter of the Green Party and Sahra Wagenknecht of The Left, have criticized the idea of putting decisions about online discourse in the hands of American companies, with the latter calling it "a slap in the face of all democratic principles". In what has been called the "first test case" of NetzDG, a German Internet user sued Facebook for deleting a post that was critical of Germany. In April 2018, the court obtained an injunction ordering that the comment be restored.

=== Unconstitutional symbols ===
Entertainment media of any kind, containing unconstitutional symbols is commonly geoblocked for German IPs even if the use of the symbol is not aimed at incitement.

=== Youth Protection Law ===
Media deemed youth endangering is commonly geoblocked. For example Steam web page for the video game Dying Light simply states, “An error was encountered while processing your request: This item is currently unavailable in your region”, when visited with a German IP.

After a game is listed as youth endangering people often remove their gameplay videos of it from Youtube and articles about it from websites to comply with the law.

== See also ==
- Internet in Germany
- Blocking of YouTube videos in Germany
- Geo-blocking
