= OpenNet Initiative =

Internet surveillance monitoring project

The OpenNet Initiative (ONI) was a joint project whose goal was to monitor and report on internet filtering and surveillance practices by nations. Started in 2002, the project employed a number of technical means, as well as an international network of investigators, to determine the extent and nature of government-run internet filtering programs. Participating academic institutions included the Citizen Lab at the Munk Centre for International Studies, University of Toronto; Berkman Center for Internet & Society at Harvard Law School; the Oxford Internet Institute (OII) at University of Oxford; and, The SecDev Group, which took over from the Advanced Network Research Group at the Cambridge Security Programme, University of Cambridge.

In December 2014 the OpenNet Initiative partners announced that they would no longer carry out research under the ONI banner. The ONI website, including all reports and data, is being maintained indefinitely to allow continued public access to ONI's entire archive of published work and data.

== Methods ==
ONI used several methods to test and document internet censorship in a country.

- Development and deployment of a suite of technical enumeration tools and core methodologies for the study of Internet filtering and surveillance;
- Capacity-building among networks of local advocates and researchers;
- Advanced studies exploring the consequences of current and future trends and trajectories in filtering and surveillance practices, and their implications for domestic and international law and governance regimes.

== Principal investigators ==
The ONI principal investigators were:

- Ronald Deibert: director, the Citizen Lab, Munk Centre for International Studies, University of Toronto
- John Palfrey: executive director, Berkman Center for Internet & Society, Harvard University
- Rafal Rohozinski: principal, The Secdev Group, previously Director, Advanced Network Research Group, Cambridge Security Programme, University of Cambridge
- Jonathan Zittrain: professor of Internet law, professor of computer science, Harvard University, co-director of Harvard's Berkman Center for Internet & Society, previously professor of Internet governance and regulation, Oxford University

== Accomplishments ==
=== Asia ===
In December 2007, the International Development Research Center of Canada approved a $1.2 million (CAD) project to expand the work of the Open Net Initiative to 15 countries in Asia. The project aims to build capacity among partners located in these countries to carry on the work of the Open Net Initiative at a national level. ONI Asia is managed by Rafal Rohozinski (The SecDev Group), and Ronald Deibert (The Citizen Lab). The regional coordinator is Al Alegre (Foundation for Media Alternatives, Philippines).

=== Psiphon ===
Psiphon is a censorship circumvention solution that allows users to access blocked web pages in countries where the Internet is censored. Psiphon allows a regular home computer to act as a personal, encrypted proxy server that allows the administrator to specify a username and password that is, in turn, given to someone in a country where internet censorship is prevalent so that users in that country will be able to browse the internet in a secure, uncensored manner.

In 2008 Psiphon was spun off as a Canadian corporation that continues to develop advanced censorship circumvention systems and technologies. Psiphon maintains its research and development lab and computer network "red team" at The Citizen Lab, Munk Centre for International Studies, University of Toronto.

=== Censorship research reports ===
There are many research papers available from the ONI that show just how pervasive internet censorship is in a certain country or region. The topics covered in these papers include not only the software or solutions used to censor the Internet, but also what kind of content is blocked (political, social, conflict/security, Internet tools, pornographic, ...).

Selected recent publications include:

- Overviews of Internet censorship and filtering in eight regions: Asia, Australia/New Zealand, the Commonwealth of Independent States, Europe, Latin America, the Middle East and North Africa, sub-Saharan Africa, and the United States/Canada.
- Country profiles summarizing the Internet censorship situation and reporting the results of ONI's testing for technical Internet filtering in 74 countries, 2007 to present.
- Maps providing a graphical representation of research into Internet censorship and filtering.
- In the Name of God: Faith Based Internet Censorship in Majority Muslim Countries, August 2011.
- The Emergence of Open and Organized Pro-Government Cyber Attacks in the Middle East: The Case of the Syrian Electronic Army, May 2011.
- West Censoring East: The Use of Western Technologies by Middle East Censors, 2010–2011, March 2011.
- Policing Content in the Quasi-Public Sphere, Jillian C. York, with Robert Faris, Ron Deibert, and Rebekah Heacock, September 2010.
- Bulletin: Sex, Social Mores and Keyword Filtering: Microsoft Bing in the "Arabian Countries", March 2010.

=== Books ===
- Access Denied—The Practice and Politics of Internet Filtering. MIT Press, 2008.
- Access Controlled—The Shaping of Power, Rights, and Rule in Cyberspace. MIT Press, 2010. Sponsored by the OSCE Representative on Freedom of the Media.
- Access Contested—Security, Identity, and Resistance in Asian Cyberspace. MIT Press, 2011.

== End of research ==
In an 18 December 2014 announcement, ONI said that:

After a decade of collaboration in the study and documentation of Internet filtering and control mechanisms around the world, the OpenNet Initiative partners will no longer carry out research under the ONI banner. The [ONI] website, including all reports and data, will be maintained indefinitely to allow continued public access to our entire archive of published work and data.

Numerous important and compelling areas of study build upon prior ONI research; ONI collaborators are actively pursuing these independently, jointly, and with new partners. We believe that the relevance and utility of this research agenda will continue to grow over time and that new tools, methods, and partnerships must emerge to meet this ongoing challenge.

== See also ==
- Censorship by country
- Freedom of information
- Internet privacy
