= Block (Internet) =

Restriction on accessing an online resource

A notice informing a user of their (indefinite) block on the English Wikipedia

On the Internet, a block or ban is a technical measure intended to restrict access to information or resources. Blocking and its inverse, unblocking, may be implemented by the owners of computers using software.

Blocking may also refer to denying access to a web server based on the Internet Protocol (IP) address. In certain websites, including social networks such as Facebook or editable databases like wikis, users can apply blocks (based in either IP address or account) on other users deemed undesirable to prevent them from performing certain actions. Blocks of this kind may occur for several reasons and produce different effects: in social networks, users can block other users without restriction, typically by preventing them from sending messages or viewing the blocker's information or profile. Administrators, moderators, or other privileged users can apply blocks that affect the access of the undesirable users to the entire website.

== Blocking by countries ==
Some countries, notably China and Singapore, block access to certain news information. In the United States, the Children's Internet Protection Act requires schools receiving federal funded discount rates for Internet access to install filter software that blocks obscene content, pornography, and, where applicable, content "harmful to minors".

== Blocking as denial of access to a website ==
Blocked or banned users may be completely unable to access all or part of a site's content, which is usually the case when censoring or filtering mechanisms are responsible for the block.

Blocking is used by moderators and administrators of social media and forums to deny access to users that have broken their rules and will likely do so again, in order to ensure a peaceful and orderly discussion in place. Common reasons for blocking are spamming, trolling, and flaming, or, in the case of wiki sites like Wikipedia, vandalism and other types of disruptive editing. Some criticize cases of the use of bans by administrators of large websites, such as Twitter, saying that these bans may be politically or financially motivated. However, websites have a legal right to decide who is allowed to post, and users often respond by "voting with their feet" and going to a place where the administrators see their behavior as acceptable.

Such blockers are also common in public settings, such as institutional, workplace, or library servers. These blockers are usually used to prevent government or company liability for users accessing obscene or illegal content.

On Facebook, it is possible for users to be blocked from doing things like posting or contacting other people.

On wiki sites like Wikipedia and Wikimedia Commons, administrators (volunteers with special privileges on their accounts) can block other users from contributing to the entire site such as uploading images or editing, creating, or moving pages but this generally doesn't affect their ability to read pages on the site. Such blocks can normally only be placed with good reason such as the user vandalizing pages or uploading non-free copyrighted content after multiple warnings, and that reason is generally seen when they attempt to edit and this reason is generally made public. Administrators who block users inappropriately may have their adminship revoked. It is possible on some wikis for users to limit interactions from them like sending them emails or sending them notifications; with such blocks, users are not notified of them.

Under a shadow ban, a user is given the false impression that their content is still being posted to the site, when in reality it is being hidden from all other users.

=== Evasion ===
Ban evasion (or block evasion) is the act of attempting to get around a block, ban, or other form of sanction imposed on the person's original account, whether temporary or permanent, on a website. Alternate accounts set up by people evading blocks or bans from websites are referred to as sock puppets.

Ban evasion can be detected by tracing a user's IP address. If two accounts are using the same IP address, it could be a sign of ban evasion. Also, the use of a VPN, shown by rapid, drastic changes of IP address by the same user in a short period of time, can also be a sign that the user was trying to get around a ban. Ban evasion can also be spotted if posts or other contributions from two accounts look the same or similar, or on sites where the same email can be associated with multiple accounts, identical or similar emails can be a sign of ban evasion. On some sites, users who have been permanently banned for ban evasion may be unable to appeal their ban.

When creating sock puppets, ban evaders use a variety of tactics to disguise the fact that the new account was created by a previously banned user, such as choosing usernames with no relation to defunct accounts, an alternate email address, VPNs or proxy servers to mask their IP address, changing their IP address (sometimes only needing to rely on a dynamic IP address to automatically change it after a time), or using the site from public Internet access locations such as schools and libraries, or resorting to usage of open proxies. Other possible measures include somewhat altering how they conduct themselves and exhibiting different behaviour in order to prevent moderators from determining that they are the same person.

== User blocking on social media ==
On social networking sites like Facebook, users may be able to block users which prevents the user they have blocked from seeing things on their profile or contacting them. Such blocking is often reciprocal, meaning the blocking user is also blocked from seeing the profile and activities of the blocked party. Users are usually not notified they have been blocked and such blocks may be private. On Facebook, users can't re-block a user they have unblocked for 48 hours after unblocking. Some websites such as DeviantArt and Discord have implemented policies that using alternate accounts to circumvent blocks can be considered harassment under their user or community guidelines, leading to suspension.

== See also ==
- Ban (law)
- Content moderation
- Internet censorship
- Access control
- IP address blocking
- Shadow banning
- DNS blocking
