= Censorship by country =

Censorship by country collects information on censorship, Internet censorship, freedom of the press, freedom of speech, and human rights by country and presents it in a sortable table, together with links to articles with more information. In addition to countries, the table includes information on former countries, disputed countries, political sub-units within countries, and regional organizations.

== Table ==
Key
Freedom House (FH) Freedom of the Press report: 10 is most free, 99 is least free
10 to 30	Free
31 to 60	Partly free
61 to 99	Not free
—	Not rated
Reporters Without Borders (RWB) Press freedom index: 6 is most free, 85 is least free
6.00 to 12.99	Good situation
13.00 to 24.99	Satisfactory situation
25.00 to 36.49	Noticeable problems
36.50 to 55.29	Difficult situation
55.30 to 85	Very serious situation
—	Not rated
OpenNet Initiative (ONI) classifications:
ne	No evidence of filtering
sus	Filtering suspected, but unconfirmed
sel	Selective filtering observed
sub	Substantial filtering observed
per	Pervasive filtering observed
nd	No data (does not indicate no censorship or no filtering)
—	Not classified
More information links:
c	Link to Censorship in country article
i	Link to Internet censorship in country article
p	Link to Freedom of the press or Freedom of speech in country article
h	Link to Human rights in country article

Country	Region	FH Free press report	RWB Press freedom index	ONI political filtering	ONI social filtering	ONI security filtering	ONI tools filtering	More info	Notes
Afghanistan	Asia	74	37.36	ne	ne	ne	ne	i h	
Albania	Europe	51	30.88	—	—	—	—	i h	
Algeria	Africa	62	36.54	ne	ne	ne	ne	c i h	
Andorra	Europe	13	6.82	—	—	—	—	h	
Angola	Africa	67	37.8	—	—	—	—	i h	
Antigua and Barbuda	NAmerica	38	—	—	—	—	—		See OECS
Argentina	SAmerica	50	25.67	—	—	—	—	i h	
Armenia	Eurasia	65	28.04	sub	sel	sel	sel	i h	
Australia	Oceania	21	15.24	ne	ne	ne	ne	c i p h	
Austria	Europe	21	9.4	—	—	—	—	i h	
Azerbaijan	Eurasia	80	47.73	sel	sel	ne	ne	i h	
Bahamas	NAmerica	20	—	—	—	—	—	i	
Bahrain	Asia	84	62.75	per	per	sel	sub	i h	
Bangladesh	Asia	52	42.01	ne	ne	ne	ne	c i p h	
Barbados	NAmerica	19	—	—	—	—	—		
Belarus	Europe	93	48.35	sel	sel	sel	sel	c i h	
Belgium	Europe	11	12.94	—	—	—	—	i h	
Belize	NAmerica	21	—	—	—	—	—	i	
Benin	Africa	34	28.33	—	—	—	—	h	
Bhutan	Asia	58	28.42	—	—	—	—	c i h	
Bolivia	SAmerica	47	32.8	—	—	—	—	i h	
Bosnia and Herzegovina	Europe	48	26.86	—	—	—	—	i	
Botswana	Africa	40	22.91	—	—	—	—	i h	
Brazil	SAmerica	44	32.75	—	—	—	—	i h	
Brunei	Asia	75	35.45	—	—	—	—		
Bulgaria	Europe	36	28.58	—	—	—	—	i h	
Burkina Faso	Africa	42	23.7	—	—	—	—	i h	
Burundi	Africa	72	38.02	—	—	—	—	i h	
Cambodia	Asia	63	41.81	—	—	—	—	i h	
Cameroon	Africa	68	34.78	—	—	—	—	i h	
Canada	NAmerica	19	12.69	ne	ne	ne	ne	c i p h	
Cape Verde	Africa	27	14.33	—	—	—	—	h	
Central African Republic	Africa	62	26.61	—	—	—	—	i h	
Chad	Africa	75	34.87	—	—	—	—	i h	
Chile	SAmerica	31	26.24	—	—	—	—	i h	
China	Asia	85	73.07	per	sub	per	sub	c i p h	
Colombia	SAmerica	55	37.48	ne	sel	ne	ne	i h	
Comoros	Africa	48	24.52	—	—	—	—	h	
Congo, Democratic Republic of the	Africa	83	41.66	—	—	—	—	i h	
Congo, Republic of the	Africa	55	28.2	—	—	—	—	i h	
Costa Rica	NAmerica	19	12.08	—	—	—	—	i	
Côte d'Ivoire	Africa	70	29.77	—	—	—	—	i	also known as the Ivory Coast
Croatia	Europe	40	26.61	ne	ne	ne	ne	i h	
Cuba	NAmerica	91	71.64	nd	nd	nd	nd	c i p h	
Cyprus	Europe	22	13.83	—	—	—	—	i h	see also Northern Cyprus
Czech Republic	Europe	19	10.17	—	—	—	—	i	
Denmark	Europe	12	7.08	ne	ne	ne	ne	c i p	
Djibouti	Africa	74	67.4	—	—	—	—		
Dominica	NAmerica	23	—	—	—	—	—		See OECS
Dominican Republic	NAmerica	41	28.34	—	—	—	—	i	
East Timor	Asia	35	28.72	—	—	—	—	i	also known as Timor-Leste
Ecuador	SAmerica	58	34.69	—	—	—	—	i	
Egypt	Africa	57	48.66	ne	ne	ne	ne	i h	
El Salvador	NAmerica	40	22.86	—	—	—	—	i h	
Equatorial Guinea	Africa	91	67.2	—	—	—	—	i h	
Eritrea	Africa	94	84.83	—	—	—	—	i h	
Estonia	Europe	18	9.26	—	—	—	—	i h	
Ethiopia	Africa	81	39.57	per	ne	sel	sel	i h	
Fiji	Oceania	58	32.69	—	—	—	—	i	
Finland	Europe	10	6.38	ne	ne	ne	ne	c i h	
France	Europe	24	21.6	ne	ne	ne	ne	c i p h	
Gabon	Africa	70	28.69	—	—	—	—	i	
Gambia	Africa	81	45.09	—	—	—	—	i	
Georgia	Eurasia	52	30.09	sel	ne	sel	ne	i h	
Germany	Europe	17	10.24	ne	ne	ne	ne	c i p h	See Internet censorship in Germany
Ghana	Africa	28	17.27	—	—	—	—	i h	
Greece	Europe	30	28.46	—	—	—	—	i h	
Greenland	NAmerica	—	—	—	—	—	—	i	See Internet censorship in Denmark
Grenada	NAmerica	24	—	—	—	—	—		See OECS
Guatemala	NAmerica	60	29.39	ne	ne	ne	ne	i	
Guinea	Africa	62	28.49	—	—	—	—	i	
Guinea-Bissau	Africa	57	28.94	—	—	—	—	i	
Guyana	SAmerica	33	27.08	—	—	—	—	i	
Haiti	NAmerica	50	24.09	—	—	—	—	i h	
Honduras	NAmerica	62	36.92	—	—	—	—	i h	
Hong Kong	Asia	33	26.16	—	—	—	—	c i h	part of China, but largely self-governing, with its own censorship policies.
Hungary	Europe	36	26.09	ne	ne	ne	ne	i	
Iceland	Europe	14	8.49	—	—	—	—	i h	
India	Asia	37	41.22	sel	sel	sel	sel	c i p h	
Indonesia	Asia	49	41.05	sel	sub	ne	sel	c i p h	
Iran	Asia	92	73.4	per	per	sub	per	c i p h	
Iraq	Asia	69	44.67	ne	ne	ne	ne	c i h	
Ireland	Europe	16	10.06	—	—	—	—	c i p	
Israel	Asia	30	32.97	ne	ne	ne	ne	c h	
Italy	Europe	33	26.11	ne	sel	ne	ne	c i p	
Jamaica	NAmerica	18	9.88	—	—	—	—	i	
Japan	Asia	22	25.17	—	—	—	—	c i p h	
Jordan	Asia	63	38.47	sel	ne	ne	ne	i h	
Kazakhstan	Eurasia	81	55.08	sel	sel	ne	ne	i h	
Kenya	Africa	52	27.8	—	—	—	—	i h	
Kiribati	Oceania	27	—	—	—	—	—		
Kosovo	Europe	49	28.47	—	—	—	—		
Kuwait	Asia	57	28.28	sel	per	sel	per	i h	
Kyrgyzstan	Asia	69	32.2	sel	sel	ne	ne	i h	
Laos	Asia	84	67.99	ne	ne	ne	ne	i h	
Latvia	Europe	27	22.89	ne	ne	ne	ne	i h	
Lebanon	Asia	51	30.15	ne	ne	ne	ne	i h	
Lesotho	Africa	49	28.36	—	—	—	—	i	
Liberia	Africa	60	29.89	—	—	—	—	i h	
Libya	Africa	60	37.86	sel	ne	ne	ne	i p h	
Liechtenstein	Europe	14	7.35	—	—	—	—	h	
Lithuania	Europe	23	18.24	—	—	—	—	i	
Luxembourg	Europe	12	6.68	—	—	—	—		
Macedonia	Europe	54	34.27	—	—	—	—	i h	
Madagascar	Africa	63	28.62	—	—	—	—	i h	
Malawi	Africa	60	28.18	—	—	—	—	i h	
Malaysia	Asia	63	42.73	ne	ne	ne	ne	c i p h	
Maldives	Asia	51	31.1	—	—	—	—	c	
Mali	Africa	24	30.03	—	—	—	—	i h	
Malta	Europe	22	23.3	—	—	—	—		
Marshall Islands	Oceania	17	—	—	—	—	—		
Mauritania	Africa	52	26.76	sel	ne	ne	ne	i h	
Mauritius	Africa	29	26.47	—	—	—	—		
Mexico	NAmerica	62	45.3	ne	ne	ne	ne	i h	
Micronesia	Oceania	21	—	—	—	—	—		
Moldova	Europe	54	26.01	sel	ne	ne	ne	i h	
Monaco	Europe	16	—	—	—	—	—		
Mongolia	Asia	37	29.93	—	—	—	—	i h	
Montenegro	Europe	35	32.97	—	—	—	—	i	
Morocco	Africa	68	39.04	ne	sel	sel	sel	i h	
Mozambique	Africa	43	28.01	—	—	—	—	i	
Myanmar	Asia	85	44.71	sel	sub	ne	sel	c i h	Also known as Burma. Beginning in September 2012 the government began to relax its censorship policies.
Namibia	Africa	32	12.5	—	—	—	—	i	
Nauru	Oceania	28	—	—	—	—	—	h	
Nepal	Asia	55	34.61	ne	ne	ne	ne	i h	
Netherlands	Europe	12	6.48	—	—	—	—	i h	
New Zealand	Oceania	17	8.38	—	—	—	—	c i h	
Nicaragua	NAmerica	49	28.31	—	—	—	—	i	
Niger	Africa	49	23.08	—	—	—	—	i h	
Nigeria	Africa	50	34.11	ne	ne	ne	ne	i h	
North Korea	Asia	97	83.9	nd	nd	nd	nd	c i h	
Northern Cyprus	Europe	—	29.34	—	—	—	—	i h	see also Cyprus
Norway	Europe	10	6.52	ne	ne	ne	ne	i p	
Oman	Asia	71	41.51	sel	per	ne	sub	i h	
Organisation of Eastern Caribbean States	NAmerica	—	19.72	—	—	—	—		
Pakistan	Asia	63	51.31	sel	sel	sub	sel	c i p h	
Palau	Oceania	16	—	—	—	—	—		
Palestine	Asia	83	43.09	ne	sub	ne	ne	i h	Gaza and the West Bank
Panama	NAmerica	46	32.95	—	—	—	—	i	
Papua New Guinea	Oceania	27	22.97	—	—	—	—	i	
Paraguay	SAmerica	60	28.78	—	—	—	—	i h	Situation changing following June 2012 parliamentary coup
Peru	SAmerica	44	31.87	ne	ne	ne	ne	i h	
Philippines	Asia	42	43.11	ne	ne	ne	ne	c h	
Poland	Europe	25	13.11	—	—	—	—	c i h	
Portugal	Europe	17	16.75	—	—	—	—	c i	
Puerto Rico	NAmerica	—	—	—	—	—	—	i	See Internet censorship in the United States
Qatar	Asia	67	32.86	sel	per	sel	per	i h	
Romania	Europe	41	23.05	ne	ne	ne	ne	c i h	
Russia	Eurasia	80	43.42	sel	sel	ne	ne	c i p h	See also Censorship in the Soviet Union
Rwanda	Africa	82	55.46	—	—	—	—	i h	
Saint Kitts and Nevis	NAmerica	20	—	—	—	—	—		See OECS
Saint Lucia	NAmerica	15	—	—	—	—	—		See OECS
Saint Vincent and the Grenadines	NAmerica	17	—	—	—	—	—		See OECS
Samoa	Oceania	29	23.84	—	—	—	—	c	
San Marino	Europe	17	—	—	—	—	—		
São Tomé and Príncipe	Africa	29	—	—	—	—	—	h	
Saudi Arabia	Asia	84	56.88	sub	per	sel	per	c i p h	
Senegal	Africa	55	26.19	—	—	—	—	i	
Serbia	Europe	35	26.59	—	—	—	—	i h	
Seychelles	Africa	56	29.19	—	—	—	—		
Sierra Leone	Africa	49	26.35	—	—	—	—	i h	
Singapore	Asia	67	43.43	ne	sel	ne	ne	c i h	
Slovakia	Europe	21	13.25	—	—	—	—	i	
Slovenia	Europe	25	20.49	—	—	—	—	i	
Solomon Islands	Oceania	28	—	—	—	—	—		
Somalia	Africa	84	73.59	—	—	—	—	c i h	
South Africa	Africa	34	24.56	—	—	—	—	i h	
South Korea	Asia	32	24.48	ne	sel	per	ne	c i p h	
South Sudan	Africa	59	36.2	—	—	—	—		
Spain	Europe	24	20.5	—	—	—	—	c i p h	
Sri Lanka	Asia	72	56.59	ne	ne	ne	ne	c h	
Sudan	Africa	78	70.06	sel	sub	ne	sub	i p h	
Suriname	SAmerica	23	18.19	—	—	—	—	i	
Swaziland	Africa	76	46.76	—	—	—	—	i h	
Sweden	Europe	10	9.23	ne	ne	ne	ne	c i p	
Switzerland	Europe	12	9.94	—	—	—	—	i h	
Syria	Asia	89	78.53	per	sel	sel	per	i h	
Taiwan (ROC)	Asia	25	23.82	—	—	—	—	c i h	Republic of China
Tajikistan	Asia	79	35.71	sel	ne	ne	ne	i h	
Tanzania	Africa	49	27.34	—	—	—	—	i	
Thailand	Asia	60	38.6	sel	sel	ne	sel	c i h	
Timor-Leste	Asia	35	28.72	—	—	—	—		also known as East Timor
Togo	Africa	69	28.45	—	—	—	—	i h	
Tonga	Oceania	29	26.7	—	—	—	—		
Trinidad and Tobago	NAmerica	25	23.12	—	—	—	—	i	
Tunisia	Africa	51	39.93	ne	ne	ne	ne	c i	
Turkey	Eurasia	55	46.56	sel	sel	ne	sel	c i h	
Turkmenistan	Asia	96	79.14	per	sel	sel	sel	i h	
Tuvalu	Oceania	26	—	—	—	—	—		
Uganda	Africa	57	31.69	ne	ne	ne	ne	i h	
Ukraine	Europe	59	36.79	ne	ne	ne	ne	i p h	
United Arab Emirates	Asia	72	33.49	sub	per	sel	per	i h	
United Kingdom	Europe	21	16.89	ne	ne	ne	ne	c i p h	
United States	NAmerica	18	18.22	ne	ne	ne	ne	c i p h	
Uruguay	SAmerica	26	15.92	—	—	—	—	i	
Uzbekistan	Asia	95	60.39	per	sel	sel	sel	i h	
Vanuatu	Oceania	26	—	—	—	—	—		
Venezuela	SAmerica	76	34.44	ne	ne	ne	ne	c i h	
Vietnam	Asia	84	71.78	per	sel	sel	sub	i h	
Western Sahara	Africa	—	—	—	—	—	—	i h	A territory disputed between Morocco and the Polisario Front. See also: Morocco entry in this table.
Yemen	Asia	83	69.22	sub	per	sel	sub	i h	
Zambia	Africa	60	27.93	—	—	—	—	i h	
Zimbabwe	Africa	80	38.12	ne	ne	ne	ne	i h	

== Maps ==
=== Freedom of the Press Report ===
2015 Freedom of the Press Classifications

Not Free
Partly Free
Free
No Data

=== Press Freedom Index ===
2014 Press Freedom Index

Very serious situation
Difficult situation
Noticeable problems
Satisfactory situation
Good situation
Not classified / No data

=== Internet censorship and surveillance ===
Internet censorship and surveillance by country (2018)

Pervasive
Substantial
Selective
Little or none
Not classified / No data

== See also ==
- Censorship
  - Censorship in South Asia
  - Internet censorship
  - Internet censorship by country
- Human rights
  - Human rights in Africa
  - Human rights in Asia
    - Human rights in Central Asia
    - Human rights in East Asia
  - Human rights in Europe
  - Human rights in the Middle East
  - Human rights in Latin America
- Blasphemy
  - Blasphemy law by country
- Freedom of speech
  - Freedom of speech by country
- Freedom of the press
- Freedom House
- Holocaust denial
  - Laws against Holocaust denial
- LGBT rights by country or territory
- Religious freedom by country
- Reporters Without Borders
  - Press Freedom Index
- Surveillance
  - Mass surveillance
    - Mass surveillance in the United Kingdom
    - Mass surveillance in the United States
