= Outline of the internet =

Overview of and topical guide to the Internet

The following outline is provided as an overview of and topical guide to the Internet.

The Internet is a worldwide, publicly accessible network of interconnected computer networks that transmit data by packet switching using the standard Internet Protocol (IP). It is a "network of networks" that consists of millions of interconnected smaller domestic, academic, business, and government networks, which together carry various information and services, such as electronic mail, online chat, file transfer, and the interlinked Web pages and other documents of the World Wide Web.

== Internet features ==
- Hosting –
  - File hosting –
  - Web hosting
  - E-mail hosting
  - DNS hosting
  - Game servers
  - Wiki farms
- Voice over IP
- IPTV

== Internet communication technology ==
=== Internet infrastructure ===
- Critical Internet infrastructure –
- Internet access –
- Internet service provider –
- Internet backbone –
- Internet exchange point (IXP) –
- Internet standard –
  - Request for Comments (RFC) –

=== Internet communication protocols ===
- Internet protocol suite –

==== Link layer ====
Link layer –

- Address Resolution Protocol (ARP/InARP) –
- Neighbor Discovery Protocol (NDP) –
- Open Shortest Path First (OSPF) –
- Tunneling protocol (Tunnels) –
  - Layer 2 Tunneling Protocol (L2TP) –
- Point-to-Point Protocol (PPP) –
- Medium access control –
  - Ethernet –
  - Digital subscriber line (DSL) –
  - Integrated Services Digital Network (ISDN) –
  - Fiber Distributed Data Interface (FDDI) –

==== Internet layer ====
Internet layer –

- Internet Protocol (IP) –
  - IPv4 –
  - IPv6 –
- Internet Control Message Protocol (ICMP) –
  - ICMPv6 –
- Internet Group Management Protocol (IGMP) –
  - IPsec –

==== Transport layer ====
Transport layer –

- Transmission Control Protocol (TCP) –
- User Datagram Protocol (UDP) –
- Datagram Congestion Control Protocol (DCCP) –
- Stream Control Transmission Protocol (SCTP) –
- Resource reservation protocol (RSVP) –
- Explicit Congestion Notification (ECN) –
- QUIC

==== Application layer ====
Application layer –

- Border Gateway Protocol (BGP) –
- Dynamic Host Configuration Protocol (DHCP) –
- Domain Name System (DNS) –
- File Transfer Protocol (FTP) –
- Hypertext Transfer Protocol (HTTP) –
- Internet Message Access Protocol (IMAP) –
- Internet Relay Chat (IRC) –
- LDAP –
- Media Gateway Control Protocol (MGCP) –
- Network News Transfer Protocol (NNTP) –
- Network Time Protocol (NTP) –
- Post Office Protocol (POP) –
- Routing Information Protocol (RIP) –
- Remote procedure call (RPC) –
- Real-time Transport Protocol (RTP) –
- Session Initiation Protocol (SIP) –
- Simple Mail Transfer Protocol (SMTP) –
- Simple Network Management Protocol (SNMP) –
- SOCKS –
- Secure Shell (SSH) –
- Telnet –
- Transport Layer Security (TLS/SSL) –
- Extensible Messaging and Presence Protocol (XMPP) –

== History of the Internet ==
- Networks prior to the Internet
  - NPL network – a local area computer network operated by a team from the National Physical Laboratory in England, the first to implement packet switching, the design of which influenced other networks that followed.
  - ARPANET – the first wide-area packet switching network, developed by the Advanced Research Projects Agency in the United States, and one of the first networks to implement the TCP/IP protocol suite which later became a technical foundation of the Internet.
  - SATNET – an early satellite packet-switched network, also developed by the Advanced Research Projects Agency, which implemented TCP/IP before the ARPANET.
  - Merit Network – a computer network created in 1966 to connect the mainframe computers at universities that is currently the oldest running regional computer network in the United States.
  - CYCLADES – a French research network created in the early 1970s that pioneered the concept of internetworking by making the hosts responsible for the reliable delivery of data on a packet-switched network, rather than this being a service of the network itself.
  - Computer Science Network (CSNET) – a computer network created in the United States for computer science departments at academic and research institutions that could not be directly connected to ARPANET, due to funding or authorization limitations. It played a significant role in spreading awareness of, and access to, national networking and was a major milestone on the path to development of the global Internet.
  - National Science Foundation Network (NSFNET) – an American networking project, initially created to link researchers to the NSF-funded supercomputing centers that, through further public funding and private industry partnerships, developed into a major part of the early Internet backbone.
- History of Internet components
  - History of packet switching – a method of grouping data into packets that are transmitted over a digital network, conceived independently by Paul Baran and Donald Davies in the early and mid-1960s.
  - History of communication protocols – the set of rules to enable data communication between computers on a network.
  - History of internetworking – networking between computers on different networks.
  - very high speed Backbone Network Service (vBNS) –
  - Network access point (NAP) –
  - Federal Internet Exchange (FIX) –
  - Commercial Internet eXchange (CIX) –
- List of Internet pioneers
- Timeline of Internet conflicts

== Internet usage ==
- Global Internet usage
- Internet traffic
- List of countries by number of Internet users
- List of European countries by number of Internet users
- List of sovereign states by number of broadband Internet subscriptions
- List of sovereign states by number of Internet hosts
- Languages used on the Internet
- List of countries by IPv4 address allocation
- Internet Census of 2012

== Internet politics ==
- Internet privacy – a subset of data privacy concerning the right to privacy from third parties including corporations and governments on the Internet.
- Internet censorship – the control or suppression of what can be accessed, published, or viewed on the Internet enacted by regulators or self-censorship.
  - Content control software – a type of software that restricts or controls the content an Internet user is capable to access.
  - Internet censorship and surveillance by country
  - Internet censorship circumvention – the use of techniques and processes to bypass filtering and censored online materials.
- Internet law – law governing the Internet, including dissemination of information and software, information security, electronic commerce, intellectual property in computing, privacy, and freedom of expression.

== Internet organizations ==
- Domain name registry or Network Information Center (NIC) – a database of all domain names and the associated registrant information in the top level domains of the Domain Name System of the Internet that allow third party entities to request administrative control of a domain name.
  - Private sub-domain registry – an NIC which allocates domain names in a subset of the Domain Name System under a domain registered with an ICANN-accredited or ccTLD registry.
- Internet Society (ISOC) – an American non-profit organization founded in 1992 to provide leadership in Internet-related standards, education, access, and policy.
- InterNIC (historical) – the organization primarily responsible for Domain Name System (DNS) domain name allocations until 2011 when it was replaced by ICANN.
- Internet Corporation for Assigned Names and Numbers (ICANN) – a nonprofit organization responsible for coordinating the maintenance and procedures of several databases related to the namespaces of the Internet, ensuring the network's stable and secure operation.
  - Internet Assigned Numbers Authority (IANA) – a department of ICANN which allocates domain names and maintains IP addresses.
- Internet Activities Board (IAB) –
  - Internet Engineering Task Force (IETF) –

=== Non-profit Internet organizations ===
- Advanced Network and Services (ANS) (historical) –
- Internet2 –
- Merit Network –
- North American Network Operators' Group (NANOG) –

=== Commercial Internet organizations ===
- Amazon.com –
- ANS CO+RE (historical) –
- Google – an American multinational technology company that specializes in Internet-related services and products, which include online advertising technologies, search engine, cloud computing, software, and hardware.

== Cultural and societal implications of the Internet ==
- Sociology – the scientific study of society, including patterns of social relationships, social interaction, and culture.
  - Sociology of the Internet – the application of sociological theory and methods to the Internet, including analysis of online communities, virtual worlds, and organizational and social change catalyzed through the Internet.
  - Digital sociology – a sub-discipline of sociology that focuses on understanding the use of digital media as part of everyday life, and how these various technologies contribute to patterns of human behavior, social relationships and concepts of the self.
- Internet culture
- List of web awards

== Underlying technology ==
- MOSFET (MOS transistor)
  - CMOS (complementary MOS)
  - LDMOS (lateral diffused MOS)
  - Power MOSFET
  - RF CMOS (radio frequency CMOS)
- Optical networking
  - Fiber-optic communication
  - Laser
  - Optical fiber
- Telecommunications network
  - Modem
  - Telecommunication circuit
- Wireless network
  - Base station
  - Cellular network
  - RF power amplifier
  - Router
  - Transceiver

== By region ==
- Internet in Africa

== By country ==
- Internet in Afghanistan
- Internet in Algeria
- Internet in Australia
- Internet in Azerbaijan
- Internet in Bahrain
- Internet in Bangladesh
- Internet in Belgium
- Internet in Botswana
- Internet in Brazil
- Internet in Bulgaria
- Internet in Canada
- Internet in Chile
- Internet in China
- Internet in Colombia
- Internet in Croatia
- Internet in Cuba
- Internet in the Czech Republic
- Internet in Denmark
- Internet in Egypt
- Internet in Estonia
- Internet in Ethiopia
- Internet in Finland
- Internet in France
- Internet in Germany
- Internet in Greece
- Internet in Iceland
- Internet in India
- Internet in Indonesia
- Internet in the Republic of Ireland
- Internet in Israel
- Internet in Italy
- Internet in Japan
- Internet in Kazakhstan
- Internet in Laos
- Internet in Malaysia
- Internet in Malta
- Internet in Mexico
- Internet in Moldova
- Internet in Morocco
- Internet in Myanmar
- Internet in Nepal
- Internet in the Netherlands
- Internet in New Zealand
- Internet in Nigeria
- Internet in North Korea
- Internet in Norway
- Internet in Pakistan
- Internet in the Philippines
- Internet in Poland
- Internet in Portugal
- Internet in Qatar
- Internet in Romania
- Internet in Russia
- Internet in Saudi Arabia
- Internet in Serbia
- Internet in Singapore
- Internet in Slovenia
- Internet in South Africa
- Internet in South Korea
- Internet in Spain
- Internet in Sweden
- Internet in Switzerland
- Internet in Taiwan
- Internet in Tajikistan
- Internet in Tanzania
- Internet in Thailand
- Internet in Tunisia
- Internet in Turkey
- Internet in Ukraine
- Internet in the United Kingdom
- Internet in the United States
- Internet in Venezuela
- Internet in Vietnam
- Internet in Yemen
- Internet in Zimbabwe

== World Wide Web ==
- Websites
- Web applications
  - Webmail –
  - Online shopping
  - Online auctions
  - Webcomics
  - Wikis

== See also ==
- Outline of information technology
