= Softpedia =

Software and tech-news website based in Romania

- Website type: Software distribution and technology news
- Available in: English, Romanian
- Owner: SoftNews NET SRL
- Website: www.softpedia.com
- Commercial: Yes
- Registration: Optional (not compulsory to download software)
- Launched: 2001; 25 years ago
- Current status: Active

Softpedia is a software and tech news website based in Romania. It indexes, reviews and hosts downloadable software and reports news on technology and science topics. It is ranked as among of the top download portals on the internet.

== History ==
Softpedia was started by two Romanian students, Bogdan Gheorghe and Cătălin Garmacea as softnews.ro. They realized that the Romanian audience was too small so they shifted the website to English and changed the domain to softpedia.com. The Romanian version was eventually discontinued because advertisers wanted a solely English website. The site got around 950,000 visits in 2005.

Softpedia's revenue in 2006 was 1.6 million euros, with 95% of the revenue coming from outside Romania.

In 2007, the Romanian website monitoring service Traffic.ro reported Softpedia as getting 3.5 million visits a week, mostly from outside of Romania. Softpedia chose to stop being monitored by Traffic.ro in June of that year.

== Features ==
The site is owned by SoftNews NET SRL, a Romanian company. Softpedia features reviews written by its staff. Each review includes a 1-to-5-star rating, and often a public rating to which any of the site's visitors may contribute.

Products are organised in categories which visitors can sort according to most recent updates, number of downloads, or rating. Softpedia serves the most recent binaries and promotes software that is recently downloaded on its front page. Free software and commercial software (and their free trials) can also be listed separately. Softpedia displays virtual awards for products free of adware, spyware and commercial tie-ins. Products that include these unrelated and/or unanticipated components and offers (which are known as potentially unwanted programs) are marked as such.

Softpedia does not repack software for distribution. It provides direct downloads of software in its original provided form, links to developers's downloads, or both. It hosts some products on its own servers in case they become unavailable from their developers' sites.

In December 2008, SoftNews NET SRL launched Autoevolution, an automotive news and reference web site.

== Safety ==
Softpedia has occasionally been used to distribute malware, such as a spyware program named OSX/OpinionSpy that was hidden in screensavers uploaded there along with MacUpdate and VersionTracker in 2010. A 2018 report found that Softpedia was relatively safe compared to other download sites, with only 4 of 148 programs tested containing unwanted Internet Explorer add-ons and stating that Softpedia was less vulnerable to man-in-the-middle attacks due to serving more stand-alone installers that do not download executable files. Softpedia displays virtual awards for products free of adware, spyware, and commercial tie-ins.

== See also ==
- Internet in Romania
