= No horny =

Chinese-language Internet meme

The original meme image of "No horny"

No horny (Chinese: 不可以色色) is an Internet meme that is widespread in Chinese-language online communities, particularly in Hong Kong and Taiwan. It consists of a Shiba Inu named "Posnan" (ポンさん) sitting in a shopping cart, with an index finger pointing at it, accompanied by a text "No horny" in Chinese. The meme is commonly used as a reaction to content that people find erotic or sexually suggestive. Serveral Yu-Gi-Oh!-style parody cards based on the meme have been created, and the meme has become a common symbol within Chinese-language Internet culture.

== Origin ==
The meme can be traced back to the "Silence, wench! I Don't Wanna Be Horny Anymore, I Wanna Be Happy", featuring a Doge cutting suggestive images. It is known as "柴柴武士" (lit, "Shiba Samurai") and Shiba Inu itself has become a symbol of overcoming sexual desire in Taiwan. In 2021, netizens rediscovered a photo showing a Shiba Inu sitting in a shopping cart with a resentful expression while being chided. They later added a Chinese caption "No horny" to the image, and it went viral in Dcard and PTT.

=== The dog ===
The dog in the original image is a female Shiba Inu named "Ponsan" (ポンさん). It was born on 6 January 2008 in Saitama Prefecture, Japan. The original image, which depicts Ponsan sitting in a shopping cart while being chided, was photographed in 2018. Its Instagram followers have increased since the meme went viral in Chinese-language online communities.

From April 2025, Ponsan, who was aged 17 at the time, had suffered from Vestibular neuritis. The owner decided to euthanise Ponsan in the end. On 31 August 2025, Ponsan's Instagram account posted an AI clip, featuring a group of aliens taking Ponsan into outer space, confirming its scheduled euthanasia tomorrow. Ponsan passed away on 1 September 2025 at the age of 17.

== Usage ==
External image
- Yu-Gi-Oh!-style parody cards based on the meme

The word "色色" is a reduplication of "色" ("lust"). In Chinese-language online communities, the meme is a common response in discussions involving sex or intimate relationships. It is generally seen as a humorous way of changing the subject rather than as a moral accusation.

Several images in a Yu-Gi-Oh! Trading Card Game format has been created based on the image, and even developed a complex "system". Common cards include:

- No horny (不可以色色): the card based on the original image.
- Yes horny (可以色色): a card counterattacking the "No horny" card.
- Anti-Horny Tabs (抗色色藥): a card similar to the "No horny" card, but implying that the recipient should take medical treatment for their sexual addiction.
- The horny jail (色色監獄): locking up all "horny" netizens into a "fictional" jail for their perverted behaviour.
