= World Press Freedom Index =

Reporters Without Borders assessment of countries' press freedom

2026 World Press Freedom Index Good: >85 points Satisfactory: 70–85 points Problematic: 55–70 points Difficult: 40–55 points Very serious: <40 points Not classified

The World Press Freedom Index (WPFI) is an annual ranking of 180 countries compiled and published by Reporters Without Borders (RSF) since 2002 based upon the assessment of the non-governmental organization as well as surveys of professionals around the world, of the countries' press freedom records in the previous year. It intends to reflect the degree of freedom that journalists, news organizations, and netizens have in each country, and the efforts made by authorities to respect this freedom.

== Methodology ==
The WPFI is based on a questionnaire for all categories except safety, which RSF monitors. The questionnaire is sent to partner organizations, correspondents, researchers and human rights experts who are all evaluating the country in which they live. As of 2013, that included 18 freedom of expression non-governmental organizations located in five continents, its 150 correspondents around the world and journalists, researchers, jurists and human rights activists.

The methodology from 2013 to 2021 used seven general criteria: pluralism (measures the degree of representation of opinions in the media space), media independence, environment and self-censorship, legislative framework, transparency, infrastructure, and abuses. In 2013, Reporters Without Borders said that the WPFI only deals with press freedom and does not measure the quality of journalism in the countries it assesses.

Starting in 2022, the qualitative survey was updated to reflect needs in a more digital era and was first combined with a quantitative score press freedom incidents. The scores are evaluated against five distinct categories: political context, legal framework, economic context, sociocultural context and safety.

=== Political context ===
This category aims to evaluate the autonomy of media and the degree of support to the media to keep government and officials accountable.

=== Legal framework ===
The questionnaire takes account of the legal framework for the media (including penalties for press offences, the existence of a state monopoly for certain kinds of media and how the media are regulated) and the level of independence of the public media. It also includes violations of the free flow of information on the Internet.

=== Economic context ===
This category aims to evaluate economic constraints put on the press by carrying out its mission. This includes loss of public financing, concentration of media ownership, and pressure from advertisers, donors or owners.

=== Sociocultural context ===
This category aims to evaluate the social and cultural constraints put on journalists to self-censor against covering specific issues because it would be in opposition to the predominant culture of a country.

=== Safety ===
RSF uses its global monitoring of the safety of journalists to score this category. This category aims to evaluate journalists' safety in disseminating news without the risk of bodily harm, psychological or emotional distress or professional harm.

Violence against journalists, netizens, and media assistants, including abuses attributable to the state, armed militias, clandestine organizations or pressure groups, are monitored by RSF staff during the year and are also part of the final score. A higher score on the report corresponds to greater freedom of the press as reported by the organization.

=== Methodology and structural criticism ===
The World Press Freedom Index has faced criticism from political scientists, media institutes, and statistical analysts regarding its underlying methodology, opaque data collection, and resulting anomalies. A primary critique focuses on the index's heavy reliance on qualitative, subjective questionnaires distributed to a small, undisclosed network of local respondents and NGOs. Critics argue that this lack of transparency obscures individual respondent bias and fails to account for varying baselines of fear; in absolute autocracies where strict self-censorship is normalized, a lack of active friction often results in fewer recorded "abuses." This statistical blind spot has produced widely criticized anomalies, such as the 2023 index ranking Taliban-controlled Afghanistan (152nd) and the absolute monarchy of Qatar (105th) significantly higher than democratic nations with highly active, pluralistic media landscapes like India (161st).

Furthermore, statistical evaluations of the Reporters Without Borders (RSF) formula indicate severe mathematical distortions when applied to highly populated countries. The quantitative "abuses score" utilizes a scale that fails to scale proportionally with a nation's total population or absolute volume of media workers. Consequently, isolated local legal disputes or regional friction points in a massive democracy are mathematically weighted with similar severity to systemic, state-wide repression in small autocracies. Media institutions in the Global South, including the Al Jazeera Media Institute, have also criticized the index for its Eurocentric framework, noting that the metrics heavily penalize domestic regulatory friction while failing to account for distinct structural pressures, such as foreign digital monopolies, regional security constraints, and external geopolitical interference.

== Rankings and scores by country or places ==
180 countries are ranked on scale from 0–100 points.

Country	2026	2025	2024	2023	2022	2021	2020	2019
Norway	(001); 92.72	(001); 92.31	(001); 91.89	(001); 95.18	(001); 92.65	(001); 93.28	(001); 92.16	(001); 92.18
Netherlands	(002); 88.92	(003); 88.64	(004); 87.73	(006); 87.00	(028); 77.93	(006); 90.33	(005); 90.04	(004); 91.37
Estonia	(003); 88.54	(002); 89.46	(006); 86.44	(008); 85.31	(004); 88.83	(015); 84.75	(014); 87.39	(011); 87.73
Denmark	(004); 88.47	(006); 86.93	(002); 89.60	(003); 89.48	(002); 90.27	(004); 91.43	(003); 91.87	(005); 90.13
Sweden	(005); 87.61	(004); 88.13	(003); 88.32	(004); 88.15	(003); 88.84	(003); 92.76	(004); 90.75	(003); 91.69
Finland	(006); 86.22	(005); 87.18	(005); 86.55	(005); 87.94	(005); 88.42	(002); 93.01	(002); 92.07	(002); 92.10
Ireland	(007); 85.93	(007); 86.92	(008); 85.59	(002); 89.91	(006); 88.3	(012); 88.09	(013); 87.40	(015); 85.00
Switzerland	(008); 84.83	(009); 83.98	(009); 84.01	(012); 84.40	(014); 82.72	(010); 89.45	(008); 89.38	(006); 89.48
Luxembourg	(009); 84.14	(013); 83.04	(011); 83.80	(020); 81.98	(021); 79.81	(020); 82.44	(017); 84.54	(017); 84.34
Portugal	(010); 83.71	(008); 84.26	(007); 85.90	(009); 84.60	(007); 87.07	(009); 89.89	(010); 88.17	(012); 87.37
Czech Republic	(011); 83.01	(010); 83.96	(017); 80.14	(014); 83.58	(020); 80.54	(040); 76.62	(040); 76.43	(040); 75.11
Iceland	(012); 82.77	(017); 81.36	(018); 80.13	(018); 83.19	(015); 82.69	(016); 84.63	(015); 84.88	(014); 85.29
Liechtenstein	(013); 82.62	(012); 83.42	(015); 81.52	(011); 84.47	(010); 84.03	(023); 80.51	(024); 80.48	(026); 79.51
Germany	(014); 82.17	(011); 83.85	(010); 83.84	(021); 81.91	(016); 82.04	(013); 84.76	(011); 87.84	(013); 85.40
Lithuania	(015); 81.34	(014); 82.27	(013); 81.73	(007); 86.79	(009); 84.14	(028); 79.95	(028); 78.81	(030); 77.94
Belgium	(016); 81.17	(018); 80.12	(016); 81.49	(031); 76.47	(023); 78.86	(011); 88.31	(012); 87.43	(009); 87.93
Latvia	(017); 81.00	(015); 81.82	(012); 82.90	(016); 83.27	(022); 79.17	(022); 80.74	(022); 81.44	(024); 80.47
United Kingdom	(018); 79.45	(020); 78.89	(023); 77.51	(026); 78.51	(024); 78.71	(033); 78.41	(035); 77.07	(033); 77.77
Austria	(019); 79.43	(022); 78.12	(032); 74.69	(029); 77.30	(031); 76.74	(017); 83.66	(018); 84.22	(016); 84.67
Canada	(020); 78.76	(021); 78.75	(014); 81.70	(015); 83.53	(019); 81.74	(013); 84.75	(016); 84.71	(018); 84.31
South Africa	(021); 77.95	(027); 75.71	(038); 73.73	(025); 78.60	(035); 75.56	(032); 78.41	(031); 77.59	(031); 77.81
New Zealand	(022); 77.38	(016); 81.37	(019); 79.72	(013); 84.23	(011); 83.54	(008); 89.96	(009); 89.31	(007); 89.25
Namibia	(023); 76.97	(028); 75.35	(034); 74.16	(022); 80.91	(018); 81.84	(024); 80.28	(023); 80.75	(023); 81.05
Fiji	(024); 76.76	(040); 71.20	(044); 71.23	(089); 59.27	(102); 56.91	(055); 72.08	(052); 72.59	(052); 72.82
France	(025); 76.68	(025); 76.62	(021); 78.65	(024); 78.72	(026); 78.53	(034); 77.4	(034); 77.08	(032); 77.79
Jamaica	(026); 75.87	(026); 75.83	(024); 77.30	(032); 75.89	(012); 83.35	(007); 90.04	(006); 89.49	(008); 88.87
Poland	(027); 75.52	(031); 74.79	(047); 69.17	(057); 67.66	(066); 65.64	(064); 71.16	(062); 71.35	(059); 71.11
Taiwan	(028); 75.44	(024); 77.04	(027); 76.13	(035); 75.54	(038); 74.08	(043); 76.14	(043); 76.24	(042); 75.02
Spain	(029); 75.42	(023); 77.35	(030); 76.01	(036); 75.37	(032); 76.71	(029); 79.56	(029); 77.84	(029); 78.01
Timor-Leste	(030); 75.29	(039); 71.79	(020); 78.92	(010); 84.49	(017); 81.89	(071); 70.89	(078); 70.10	(084); 70.07
Moldova	(031); 74.77	(035); 73.36	(031); 74.86	(028); 77.62	(040); 73.47	(089); 68.39	(091); 68.84	(091); 68.79
Trinidad and Tobago	(032); 74.70	(019); 79.71	(025); 76.69	(030); 76.54	(025); 78.68	(031); 78.45	(036); 76.78	(039); 75.26
Australia	(033); 74.58	(029); 75.15	(039); 73.42	(027); 78.24	(039); 73.77	(025); 80.21	(026); 79.79	(021); 83.45
Suriname	(034); 73.20	(032); 74.49	(028); 76.11	(048); 70.62	(052); 68.95	(019); 83.05	(020); 82.50	(020); 83.62
Seychelles	(035); 73.04	(045); 68.56	(037); 73.75	(034); 75.71	(013); 83.33	(052); 74.34	(063); 71.34	(069); 70.59
Slovenia	(036); 72.88	(033); 74.06	(042); 72.60	(050); 70.59	(054); 68.54	(036); 76.9	(032); 77.36	(034); 77.69
Slovakia	(037); 72.71	(038); 72.83	(029); 76.03	(017); 83.22	(027); 78.37	(035); 76.98	(033); 77.33	(035); 76.42
Costa Rica	(038); 72.35	(036); 73.09	(026); 76.13	(023); 80.20	(008); 85.92	(005); 91.24	(007); 89.47	(010); 87.76
Ghana	(039); 72.20	(052); 67.13	(050); 67.71	(062); 65.93	(060); 67.43	(030); 78.67	(030); 77.74	(027); 79.19
Cape Verde	(040); 71.98	(030); 74.98	(041); 72.77	(033); 75.72	(036); 75.37	(027); 79.91	(025); 79.85	(025); 80.19
Montenegro	(041); 71.80	(037); 72.83	(040); 73.21	(039); 74.28	(063); 66.54	(104); 65.67	(105); 66.17	(104); 67.26
Mauritius	(042); 70.92	(051); 67.31	(057); 65.55	(063); 65.56	(064); 66.07	(061); 71.26	(056); 72.00	(058); 71.54
Gabon	(043); 70.57	(041); 70.65	(056); 65.83	(094); 58.12	(105); 56	(117); 61.4	(121); 62.80	(115); 64.40
Dominican Republic	(044); 69.73	(043); 69.87	(035); 73.89	(043); 71.88	(030); 76.9	(050); 74.4	(055); 72.10	(055); 72.10
North Macedonia	(045); 69.49	(042); 70.44	(036); 73.78	(038); 74.35	(057); 68.44	(090); 68.33	(092); 68.72	(095); 68.34
Gambia	(046); 69.42	(058); 65.49	(058); 65.53	(046); 71.06	(050); 69.25	(085); 69.24	(087); 69.38	(092); 68.65
South Korea	(047); 69.12	(061); 64.06	(062); 64.87	(047); 70.83	(043); 72.11	(042); 76.57	(042); 76.30	(041); 75.06
Uruguay	(048); 68.72	(059); 65.18	(051); 67.70	(052); 70.33	(044); 72.03	(018); 83.62	(019); 84.21	(019); 83.94
Romania	(049); 67.71	(055); 66.42	(049); 68.45	(053); 69.04	(056); 68.46	(048); 75.09	(048); 74.09	(047); 74.33
Armenia	(050); 67.02	(034); 73.96	(043); 71.60	(049); 70.61	(051); 68.97	(063); 71.17	(061); 71.40	(061); 71.02
Tonga	(051); 66.62	(046); 68.39	(045); 70.11	(044); 71.29	(049); 69.74	(046); 75.41	(050); 72.73	(045); 74.59
Brazil	(052); 66.37	(063); 63.8	(082); 58.59	(092); 58.67	(110); 55.36	(111); 63.75	(107); 65.95	(105); 67.21
Croatia	(053); 66.31	(060); 64.20	(048); 68.79	(042); 71.95	(048); 70.42	(056); 72.05	(059); 71.49	(064); 70.97
Ivory Coast	(054); 66.27	(064); 63.69	(053); 66.89	(054); 68.83	(037); 74.46	(066); 71.13	(068); 71.06	(071); 70.48
Ukraine	(055); 66.10	(062); 63.93	(061); 65.00	(079); 61.19	(106); 55.76	(097); 67.04	(096); 67.48	(102); 67.54
Italy	(056); 65.16	(049); 68.01	(046); 69.80	(041); 72.05	(058); 68.16	(041); 76.61	(041); 76.31	(043); 75.02
Liberia	(058); 64.54	(054); 66.75	(060); 65.13	(066); 64.34	(075); 62.77	(098); 66.64	(095); 67.75	(093); 68.51
Samoa	(059); 64.53	(044); 69.28	(022); 78.41	(019); 82.15	(045); 71.39	(021); 80.76	(021); 81.75	(022); 81.75
Andorra	(060); 63.91	(065); 63.30	(072); 61.44	(037); 75.05	(053); 68.79	(039); 76.68	(037); 76.77	(037); 75.37
Mauritania	(061); 63.36	(050); 67.52	(033); 74.20	(086); 59.45	(097); 58.1	(094); 67.75	(097); 67.46	(094); 68.35
Japan	(062); 62.90	(066); 63.14	(070); 62.12	(068); 63.95	(071); 64.37	(067); 71.12	(066); 71.14	(067); 70.64
Botswana	(063); 62.89	(081); 57.64	(079); 59.78	(065); 64.61	(095); 58.49	(038); 76.75	(039); 76.44	(044); 74.91
United States	(064); 62.61	(057); 65.49	(055); 66.59	(045); 71.22	(042); 72.74	(044); 76.07	(045); 76.15	(048); 74.31
Panama	(065); 62.14	(053); 66.75	(083); 58.55	(069); 63.67	(074); 62.78	(077); 70.06	(076); 70.22	(079); 70.22
Belize	(066); 61.66	(047); 68.32	(054); 66.85	(051); 70.49	(047); 70.67	(053); 72.39	(053); 72.50	(053); 72.50
Malta	(067); 61.44	(067); 62.96	(073); 60.96	(084); 59.76	(078); 61.55	(081); 69.54	(081); 69.84	(077); 70.26
Congo	(068); 61.21	(071); 60.58	(069); 62.57	(081); 60.42	(093); 58.64	(118); 61.17	(118); 63.44	(117); 63.96
Malawi	(069); 60.96	(076); 59.20	(063); 64.46	(082); 60.34	(080); 61.4	(062); 71.2	(069); 70.68	(068); 70.64
Chile	(070); 60.84	(069); 62.25	(052); 67.32	(083); 60.09	(082); 60.61	(054); 72.11	(051); 72.69	(046); 74.35
Bulgaria	(071); 60.28	(070); 60.78	(059); 65.32	(071); 62.98	(091); 59.12	(112); 62.71	(111); 64.94	(111); 64.89
Comoros	(072); 60.23	(075); 59.27	(071); 61.47	(075); 62.25	(083); 60.16	(084); 69.35	(075); 70.23	(056); 72.09
Papua New Guinea	(073); 60.11	(078); 58.35	(091); 56.02	(059); 67.62	(062); 66.66	(047); 75.12	(046); 76.07	(038); 75.30
Hungary	(074); 59.85	(068); 62.82	(067); 62.98	(072); 62.96	(085); 59.8	(092); 68.24	(089); 69.16	(087); 69.56
Qatar	(075); 59.79	(079); 58.25	(084); 58.48	(105); 55.28	(119); 49.03	(128); 57.4	(129); 57.49	(128); 57.49
Guyana	(076); 59.58	(073); 60.12	(077); 60.10	(060); 67.50	(034); 76.41	(051); 74.39	(049); 73.37	(051); 73.37
Zambia	(077); 58.58	(082); 57.33	(095); 55.38	(087); 59.41	(109); 55.4	(115); 61.79	(120); 63.00	(119); 63.62
Senegal	(078); 58.11	(074); 59.43	(094); 55.44	(104); 55.82	(073); 63.07	(049); 74.78	(047); 76.01	(049); 74.19
Sierra Leone	(079); 57.06	(056); 66.36	(064); 64.27	(074); 62.55	(046); 71.03	(075); 70.39	(085); 69.72	(086); 69.64
Cyprus	(080); 56.91	(077); 59.04	(065); 63.14	(055); 68.62	(065); 65.97	(026); 80.15	(027); 79.55	(028); 78.26
Central African Republic	(081); 56.73	(072); 60.15	(076); 60.12	(098); 57.56	(101); 56.96	(126); 58.08	(132); 57.13	(145); 52.73
Northern Cyprus	(082); 56.57	(091); 54.84	(090); 56.72	(076); 61.73	(081); 61.08	(076); 70.18	(077); 70.21	(074); 70.33
Albania	(083); 56.52	(080); 58.18	(099); 54.10	(096); 57.86	(103); 56.41	(083); 69.41	(084); 69.75	(082); 70.16
Kosovo	(084); 55.89	(099); 52.73	(075); 60.19	(056); 68.38	(061); 67	(078); 69.68	(070); 70.67	(075); 70.32
Mongolia	(085); 55.79	(102); 52.57	(109); 51.34	(088); 59.33	(090); 59.17	(068); 71.03	(073); 70.39	(070); 70.49
Greece	(086); 55.05	(089); 55.37	(088); 57.15	(107); 55.20	(108); 55.52	(070); 70.99	(065); 71.20	(065); 70.92
Nepal	(087); 54.80	(090); 55.20	(074); 60.52	(095); 57.89	(076); 62.67	(106); 65.38	(112); 64.90	(106); 66.60
Paraguay	(088); 54.67	(084); 56.84	(115); 50.48	(103); 55.96	(096); 58.36	(100); 66.48	(100); 67.03	(099); 67.60
Lesotho	(089); 54.37	(107); 52.07	(122); 48.92	(067); 64.29	(088); 59.39	(088); 68.30	(086); 69.55	(078); 70.26
Bosnia and Herzegovina	(090); 54.29	(086); 56.33	(081); 58.85	(064); 65.43	(067); 65.64	(058); 71.66	(058); 71.49	(063); 70.98
Bolivia	(091); 54.25	(093); 54.09	(124); 48.88	(117); 51.09	(126); 47.58	(110); 64.53	(114); 64.63	(113); 64.62
Thailand	(092); 53.97	(085); 56.72	(087); 58.12	(106); 55.24	(115); 50.15	(137); 54.78	(140); 55.06	(136); 55.90
Chad	(093); 53.90	(108); 51.89	(096); 54.81	(109); 53.73	(104); 56.18	(123); 59.8	(123); 60.30	(122); 63.29
Equatorial Guinea	(094); 52.79	(118); 48.68	(127); 46.49	(120); 50.35	(141); 43.96	(164); 44.33	(165); 43.62	(165); 41.65
Malaysia	(095); 52.73	(088); 56.09	(107); 52.07	(073); 62.83	(113); 51.55	(119); 60.53	(101); 66.88	(123); 63.26
Brunei	(096); 52.58	(097); 53.47	(117); 50.09	(142); 44.20	(144); 42.53	(154); 50.09	(152); 50.35	(152); 48.52
Togo	(097); 52.56	(121); 48.03	(113); 50.89	(070); 63.06	(100); 57.17	(074); 70.41	(071); 70.67	(076); 70.31
Argentina	(098); 52.44	(087); 56.14	(066); 63.13	(040); 73.36	(029); 77.28	(069); 71.01	(064); 71.22	(057); 71.70
Mozambique	(099); 52.27	(101); 52.63	(105); 52.42	(102); 56.13	(116); 49.89	(108); 64.61	(104); 66.21	(103); 67.34
Guinea-Bissau	(100); 51.99	(110); 51.36	(092); 55.95	(078); 61.57	(092); 58.79	(095); 67.32	(094); 67.94	(089); 69.05
Eswatini	(101); 51.94	(098); 52.86	(085); 58.31	(111); 52.66	(131); 46.42	(141); 53.66	(141); 54.85	(147); 50.91
Colombia	(102); 51.66	(115); 49.8	(119); 49.63	(139); 45.23	(145); 42.43	(134); 56.26	(130); 57.34	(129); 57.18
Madagascar	(103); 50.95	(113); 50.80	(100); 54.07	(101); 56.66	(098); 58.02	(057); 71.76	(054); 72.32	(054); 72.24
Serbia	(104); 50.79	(096); 53.55	(098); 54.48	(091); 59.16	(079); 61.51	(093); 67.97	(093); 68.38	(090); 68.82
Morocco	(105); 50.55	(120); 48.04	(129); 45.97	(144); 43.69	(135); 45.42	(136); 56.06	(133); 57.12	(135); 56.02
Kenya	(106); 50.51	(117); 49.41	(102); 53.22	(116); 51.15	(069); 64.59	(102); 66.35	(103); 66.28	(100); 67.56
Haiti	(107); 50.32	(111); 51.06	(093); 55.92	(099); 57.38	(070); 64.55	(087); 68.88	(083); 69.80	(062); 71.00
Maldives	(108); 49.23	(104); 52.46	(106); 52.36	(100); 56.93	(087); 59.55	(072); 70.87	(079); 70.07	(098); 67.84
Angola	(109); 48.82	(100); 52.67	(104); 52.44	(125); 48.30	(099); 57.17	(103); 65.94	(106); 66.08	(109); 65.04
Burkina Faso	(110); 48.52	(105); 52.25	(086); 58.24	(058); 67.64	(041); 73.12	(037); 76.83	(038); 76.53	(036); 75.47
Guinea	(111); 48.45	(103); 52.53	(078); 59.97	(085); 59.51	(084); 59.82	(109); 64.58	(110); 65.66	(107); 66.51
Nigeria	(112); 48.11	(122); 46.81	(112); 51.03	(123); 49.56	(129); 46.79	(120); 60.31	(115); 64.37	(120); 63.50
Benin	(113); 47.39	(092); 54.60	(089); 56.73	(112); 52.44	(121); 48.39	(114); 61.82	(113); 64.89	(096); 68.26
Philippines	(114); 46.79	(116); 49.57	(134); 43.36	(132); 46.21	(147); 41.84	(138); 54.36	(136); 56.46	(134); 56.09
Lebanon	(115); 46.49	(132); 42.62	(140); 41.91	(119); 50.46	(130); 46.58	(107); 65.07	(102); 66.81	(101); 67.56
Israel	(116); 46.46	(112); 51.06	(101); 53.23	(097); 57.57	(086); 59.62	(086); 69.1	(088); 69.16	(088); 69.20
Tanzania	(117); 46.22	(095); 53.68	(097); 54.80	(143); 44.02	(123); 48.28	(124); 59.31	(124); 59.75	(118); 63.72
South Sudan	(118); 46.16	(109); 51.63	(136); 42.57	(118); 50.62	(128); 47.06	(139); 54.22	(138); 55.51	(139); 54.35
Burundi	(119); 46.14	(125); 45.44	(108); 51.78	(114); 52.14	(107); 55.74	(147); 52.43	(160); 44.67	(159); 47.11
Niger	(120); 46.02	(083); 57.05	(080); 59.71	(061); 66.84	(059); 67.8	(059); 71.56	(057); 71.75	(066); 70.74
Mali	(121); 45.63	(119); 48.23	(114); 50.56	(113); 52.29	(111); 54.48	(099); 66.5	(108); 65.88	(112); 64.77
Mexico	(122); 45.23	(124); 45.55	(121); 49.01	(128); 47.98	(127); 47.57	(143); 53.29	(143); 54.55	(144); 53.22
Singapore	(123); 44.57	(123); 45.78	(126); 47.19	(129); 47.88	(139); 44.23	(160); 44.8	(158); 44.77	(151); 48.59
Zimbabwe	(124); 44.37	(106); 52.10	(116); 50.31	(126); 48.17	(137); 44.94	(130); 56.88	(126); 59.05	(127); 57.77
Ecuador	(125); 44.37	(094); 53.76	(110); 51.30	(080); 60.51	(068); 64.61	(096); 67.17	(098); 67.38	(097); 68.12
Somalia	(126); 43.84	(136); 40.49	(145); 39.40	(141); 44.24	(140); 44.01	(161); 44.53	(163); 44.55	(164); 42.76
Oman	(127); 43.67	(134); 42.29	(137); 42.52	(155); 37.87	(163); 35.99	(133); 56.63	(135); 56.58	(132); 56.58
Guatemala	(128); 43.21	(138); 40.32	(138); 42.28	(127); 48.12	(124); 47.94	(116); 61.55	(116); 64.26	(116); 64.06
Indonesia	(129); 43.02	(127); 44.13	(111); 51.15	(108); 54.83	(117); 49.27	(113); 62.6	(119); 63.18	(124); 63.23
DR Congo	(130); 42.16	(133); 42.31	(123); 48.91	(124); 48.55	(125); 47.66	(149); 51.41	(150); 50.91	(154); 48.29
Uganda	(131); 41.98	(143); 37.61	(128); 46.00	(133); 46.08	(132); 46.35	(125); 58.81	(125); 59.05	(125); 60.58
Honduras	(132); 41.02	(142); 38.51	(146); 38.18	(169); 32.65	(165); 34.61	(151); 50.65	(148); 51.80	(146); 51.47
Cameroon	(133); 40.88	(131); 42.75	(130); 44.95	(138); 45.58	(118); 49.1	(135); 56.22	(134); 56.72	(131); 56.68
Sri Lanka	(134); 40.77	(139); 39.93	(150); 35.21	(135); 45.85	(146); 42.13	(127); 57.8	(127); 58.06	(126); 60.39
Georgia	(135); 40.77	(114); 50.53	(103); 53.05	(077); 61.69	(089); 59.3	(060); 71.36	(060); 71.41	(060); 71.02
Kuwait	(136); 40.44	(128); 44.06	(131); 44.66	(154); 38.84	(158); 37.87	(105); 65.64	(109); 65.70	(108); 66.14
Tunisia	(137); 40.43	(129); 43.48	(118); 49.97	(121); 50.11	(094); 58.49	(073); 70.47	(072); 70.55	(072); 70.39
Libya	(138); 40.34	(137); 40.42	(143); 40.59	(149); 40.22	(143); 43.16	(165); 44.27	(164); 44.23	(162); 44.23
Rwanda	(139); 39.58	(146); 35.84	(144); 40.54	(131); 46.58	(136); 45.18	(156); 49.34	(155); 49.66	(155); 47.57
Hong Kong	(140); 39.49	(140); 39.86	(135); 43.06	(140); 44.86	(148); 41.64	(080); 69.56	(080); 69.99	(073); 70.35
Syria	(141); 39.44	(177); 15.82	(179); 17.41	(175); 27.22	(171); 28.94	(173); 29.37	(174); 27.43	(174); 28.22
Jordan	(142); 39.33	(147); 35.25	(132); 44.30	(146); 42.79	(120); 48.66	(129); 57.11	(128); 57.92	(130); 56.89
El Salvador	(143); 38.88	(135); 41.19	(133); 44.01	(115); 51.36	(112); 54.09	(082); 69.51	(074); 70.30	(081); 70.19
Peru	(144); 37.86	(130); 42.88	(125); 47.76	(110); 52.74	(077); 61.75	(091); 68.29	(090); 69.06	(085); 69.78
Algeria	(145); 37.38	(126); 44.64	(139); 41.98	(136); 45.74	(134); 45.53	(146); 52.74	(146); 54.48	(141); 54.25
Kyrgyzstan	(146); 35.06	(144); 37.46	(120); 49.11	(122); 49.91	(072); 64.25	(079); 69.63	(082); 69.81	(083); 70.08
Uzbekistan	(147); 34.95	(148); 35.24	(148); 37.27	(137); 45.73	(133); 46.35	(157); 49.26	(156); 46.93	(160); 46.48
Ethiopia	(148); 34.66	(145); 36.92	(141); 41.37	(130); 47.70	(114); 50.53	(101); 66.37	(099); 67.18	(110); 64.89
Kazakhstan	(149); 34.41	(141); 39.34	(142); 41.11	(134); 45.87	(122); 48.28	(155); 49.72	(157); 45.89	(158); 47.18
Bhutan	(150); 33.50	(152); 32.62	(147); 37.29	(090); 59.25	(033); 76.46	(065); 71.14	(067); 71.10	(080); 70.19
Cambodia	(151); 33.28	(161); 28.18	(151); 34.28	(147); 42.02	(142); 43.48	(144); 53.16	(144); 54.54	(143); 54.10
Bangladesh	(152); 33.05	(149); 33.71	(165); 27.64	(163); 35.31	(162); 36.63	(152); 50.29	(151); 50.63	(150); 49.26
Pakistan	(153); 32.61	(158); 29.62	(152); 33.90	(150); 39.95	(157); 37.99	(145); 53.14	(145); 54.48	(142); 54.17
Laos	(154); 32.54	(150); 33.22	(153); 33.76	(160); 36.66	(161); 36.64	(172); 29.44	(172); 35.72	(171); 35.51
Tajikistan	(155); 32.22	(153); 32.21	(155); 33.31	(153); 39.06	(152); 40.26	(162); 44.48	(161); 44.66	(161); 45.98
Palestine	(156); 32.09	(163); 27.41	(157); 31.92	(156); 37.86	(170); 28.98	(132); 56.82	(137); 55.91	(137); 55.32
India	(157); 31.96	(151); 32.96	(159); 31.28	(161); 36.62	(150); 41	(142); 53.44	(142); 54.67	(140); 54.33
United Arab Emirates	(158); 30.86	(164); 26.91	(160); 30.62	(145); 42.99	(138); 44.46	(131); 56.87	(131); 57.31	(133); 56.37
Venezuela	(159); 30.48	(160); 29.21	(156); 33.06	(159); 36.99	(159); 37.78	(148); 52.4	(147); 54.34	(148); 50.90
Cuba	(160); 29.22	(165); 26.03	(168); 25.63	(172); 29.00	(173); 27.32	(171); 36.06	(171); 36.19	(169); 36.19
Sudan	(161); 29.02	(156); 30.34	(149); 35.73	(148); 40.83	(151); 40.96	(159); 47.07	(159); 44.67	(175); 27.55
Iraq	(162); 28.85	(155); 30.69	(169); 25.48	(167); 32.94	(172); 28.59	(163); 44.43	(162); 44.63	(156); 47.40
Turkey	(163); 27.94	(159); 29.40	(158); 31.60	(165); 33.97	(149); 41.25	(153); 50.21	(154); 49.98	(157); 47.19
Yemen	(164); 27.89	(154); 31.45	(154); 33.67	(168); 32.78	(169); 29.14	(169); 37.65	(167); 41.75	(168); 38.34
Belarus	(165); 27.72	(166); 25.73	(167); 26.80	(157); 37.17	(153); 39.62	(158); 49.18	(153); 50.25	(153); 48.34
Myanmar	(166); 26.38	(169); 25.32	(171); 24.41	(173); 28.26	(176); 25.03	(140); 53.86	(139); 55.23	(138); 55.08
Djibouti	(167); 25.04	(168); 25.36	(161); 30.14	(162); 35.87	(164); 35.75	(176); 21.38	(176); 23.27	(173); 28.64
Nicaragua	(168); 24.98	(172); 22.83	(163); 29.20	(158); 37.09	(160); 37.09	(121); 60.02	(117); 64.19	(114); 64.47
Egypt	(169); 24.92	(170); 24.74	(170); 25.10	(166); 33.37	(168); 30.23	(166); 43.83	(166); 43.18	(163); 43.53
Bahrain	(170); 24.84	(157); 30.24	(173); 23.21	(171); 30.59	(167); 30.97	(168); 38.9	(169); 39.87	(167); 38.69
Azerbaijan	(171); 23.95	(167); 25.47	(164); 27.99	(151); 39.93	(154); 39.4	(167); 41.23	(168); 41.52	(166); 40.87
Russia	(172); 23.15	(171); 24.57	(162); 29.86	(164); 34.77	(155); 38.82	(150); 51.29	(149); 51.08	(149); 49.69
Turkmenistan	(173); 23.06	(174); 19.14	(175); 22.01	(176); 25.82	(177); 25.01	(178); 19.97	(179); 14.56	(180); 14.56
Vietnam	(174); 21.15	(173); 19.74	(174); 22.31	(178); 24.58	(174); 26.11	(175); 21.54	(175); 25.29	(176); 25.07
Afghanistan	(175); 19.51	(175); 17.88	(178); 19.09	(152); 39.75	(156); 38.27	(122); 59.81	(122); 62.30	(121); 63.45
Saudi Arabia	(176); 19.11	(162); 27.94	(166); 27.14	(170); 32.43	(166); 33.71	(170); 37.27	(170); 37.86	(172); 34.12
Iran	(177); 17.45	(176); 16.22	(176); 21.30	(177); 24.81	(178); 23.22	(174); 27.3	(173); 35.19	(170); 35.59
China	(178); 13.85	(178); 14.80	(172); 23.36	(179); 22.97	(175); 25.17	(177); 21.28	(177); 21.52	(177); 21.08
North Korea	(179); 12.67	(179); 12.64	(177); 20.66	(180); 21.72	(180); 13.92	(179); 18.72	(180); 14.18	(179); 16.60
Eritrea	(180); 10.24	(180); 11.32	(180); 16.64	(174); 27.86	(179); 19.62	(180); 18.55	(178); 16.50	(178); 19.74

== Analysis ==
Between 2002 and 2014, a study found that the ratings became more similar to the press freedom ratings by Freedom House and that more data became available to make ratings more precise. The authors also found a significant correlation with the United Nations Human Development Index scores.

As of 2026, South Africa had been outperforming peer countries due to its robust civil society. That same year, the World Press Freedom Index found that three in four countries were faring "problematic" or worse, including the United States.

== See also ==
- Censorship by country
- Chapultepec Index
- Internet censorship and surveillance by country
- List of freedom indices
- Lists of journalists (includes lists of journalists killed)
- World Press Freedom Day
