= WorldLink Communications =

Internet service provider in Nepal

WorldLink Communications Ltd.
- Native name: वर्ल्डलिङ्क कम्युनिकेसन (Nepali)
- Type: Private
- Industry: Telecommunications
- Founded: September 1995
- Founder: Dileep Agrawal
- Headquarters: Kathmandu, Nepal
- Area served: Nepal
- Key people: Samit Jana, Keshav Nepal,
- Services: Broadband Internet access
- Owners: Dileep Agrawal, Bijay Jalan, Manoj Agrawal
- Number of employees: 5500
- Website: worldlink.com.np

WorldLink Communications is an Internet service provider in Nepal. The nation's largest ISP, it has 900,000 active consumer accounts and 2,000 business accounts, along with approximately 25,000 subscribers to its NET TV IPTV service, and covers 73 of the nation's 77 districts. As of 2023, it has around 700,000 fiber to the home customers and 31% market share in Nepal.

== History ==
The company started off as an email service provider back in 1995. At that time the country's only way of communication medium to the outside world was the VSAT satellite and High frequency radios. There was an open-wire telephone line from Kathmandu to Raxaul which was established in 1913, but it was limited for modern communication. The company was using lease lines from another company Mercantile Communications Pvt Ltd with around 64 kbit/s bandwidth.

Later in 1998, the company established its own VSAT satellite communication to the outside world and also started providing internet service to the masses. The satellite link was done with the help of a Thailand-based station. A private company having its own VSAT terminal was huge at that time in the South Asian countries.

In 2003, the company started expanding its internet services to the public with Coaxial cable. The company was having a hard time keeping up with the country's state-owned communication company Nepal Telecom. ADSL technology used by Nepal Telecom was superior to the distribution method used by the WorldLink Communications at that time.

The company also experimented with the Wireless Internet to expand its services outside the Kathmandu Valley. It had lots of problems and speed issues.

In 2007, the country finally had its first cross-border fiber link with India with high-speed internet capability. WorldLink Communications first connected their backbone uplink to the fiber cross-border internet in 2008. This eliminated the hefty reliance and dependence on Nepal Telecom and VSAT technology.

FTTH service was first launched in 2014 for public customers. Within a few years, the company completely shifted to fiber technology. The backbone network and the core routers were upgraded and optimised to work with fiber technology. This helped the company to scale the user base without any hassle and made the backbone more flexible.

=== Mobile app ===
Around 2015, WorldLink Communications launched its first customer mobile app. The mobile app had the features to display critical information about the customer's internet package and the Customer-premises equipment. It also vastly improved customer support as the app let users create trouble tickets easily. The development of the mobile app let the company further expand its Customer-premises equipment with TR-069 integration. This vastly improved and minimized the on-field troubleshooting. The company initially chose Huawei for the Customer-premises equipment but later moved to Nokia.

=== IPTV service ===
WorldLink Communications along with other ISPs started providing IPTV services to their customers in 2016. The IPTV service was very feature rich with features that were not seen before in the market, which made it an instant hit. The Set-top boxes used by the IPTV service were really powerful and flexible. The Set-top boxes were running Android and had decent processing speed to deliver high-quality videos and features. With most of the network and backbone fiberized, the company started focusing on the OTT platform. In around 2020, the company unofficially brought the rights for the brand NETTV, which initially was a joint venture among multiple ISPs. This let other big ISPs to start their own IPTV brand. In around 2021, the company NETTV launched its first OTT service called NetTV Cine+, doing a partnership for content with Hungama and Eros Now. Not long after that, the company launched a brand new Set-top box with a Google Certified Android TV OS in 2022 called NETTV Streamz+. The new Set-top box had many new features that were exclusive to the box.

=== Hotspot service ===
The company first announced the hotspot service in 2019, and later within the year, it started deploying its hotspot services all over the country. For the backend software of the hotspot, the company partnered with Meta Platforms to use Express Wi-Fi and for the hotspot CPE, they have partnered with IgniteNet. As per the company, it has over 30k+ hotspots all over the country in 2023. It also has separate WiFi access points for its customers with IEEE 802.1X and Protected Extensible Authentication Protocol, which allow users to connect to the hotspot without any limits. WorldLink Communications dominates the hotspot market right now in the country.

=== IPv6 Deployment ===
In around 2020 A.D, WorldLink Communications started providing IPv6 to its customers in a dual stack method. The customers are provided with /64 prefix delegation while CPE's WAN is assigned with a single v6 IP. Since the CPE is running with a dual-stack, it gets two WAN IPs, one is NAT v4 and another is a v6 public. There are 29 IPv6 prefixes announced by AS17501. Examples of prefixes are 2400:1a00::/32 and 2400:1a00:8002::/48. As of now almost all of the infrastructure and backbone network of the company runs on IPV6. As per the company's officials, they claim that the deployment of the IPv6 has greatly improved the network latency among the customers. The deployment of the IPV6 has also made it easier for power users to self-host and access it outside the internet.

== Dileep Agrawal ==
Dileep Agrawal is a Nepalese entrepreneur. Agrawal takes an interest in environmental development activities including dealing with climate change.

=== Early life and education ===
Agrawal was born in the Gaur terai region of Nepal, the son of Professor Vishwanath Agrawal. He completed his schooling in Nepal and in 1992 was awarded a full scholarship at Bates College, Maine, United States, where he graduated in 1996. He started an e-mail service in Nepal with his cousins as partners while he was in Nepal for a summer vacation, establishing WorldLink Communications Pvt. Ltd. in 1995, and then returned to the United States to complete his college education. After completion of his college degree he returned to Nepal to continue his business career in a budding Internet business.

== See also ==
- List of internet service providers in Nepal
- Vianet Communications
