= Internet in Nepal =

Although in 2011 only about 9.0% percent of Nepal's population used the Internet, use of the Internet in Nepal is growing rapidly. As of July 2021, 90.6% of the population has access to the Internet according to Nepal Telecommunications Authority (NTA).

Internet penetration stands at 90.56 percent of the population and that of fixed broadband internet service providers stands at 25 percent of the population, a significant increase from 2018, when total internet penetration was 56 percent of the population and fixed broadband users stood at 12 percent of the population, according to the Nepal Telecommunications Authority.

The competition between major telecom operators encouraged them to provide cellular coverage to different parts of the country. The cellular/ mobile coverage is one of the main driver of this internet connectivity and usage. As per the TKP data, around 95.62 percent of people live within the coverage area of the mobile tower. Other drivers for increment in internet users include the inexpensive internet-enabled cellular phone and availability of cheap broadband internet.

This is the result of a competitive Internet service provider (ISP) market. As of April 2020, more than 39 ISPs offer Internet access to businesses and regular consumers, Although few ISPs like Worldlink, Vianet Communications, Subisu, Websurfer and Mercantile, dominate the market with a combined share of more than 70 percent. Around 2010–2015, Cyber cafés were important sources of Internet access for Nepalis; the country was believed to have the highest concentration of cybercafés in the world. Much of Nepal's Internet access is concentrated in the more-developed Kathmandu Valley region, as the mountainous terrain and low income in remote regions of the country make access more difficult. However, projects to bring Internet access to rural populations like the Nepal Wireless Networking Project has already wirelessly connected seven remote mountain villages to the Internet, with plans to network twenty-one villages in all. With recent availability of the Chaudhary Group owned cheap ISP, CG Net in 2021, broadband prices are expected to come down as a result of cheap Internet service provided by CG Net.

== History ==
The introduction of the Internet to Nepal began in August 1994, spearheaded by Sanjay Manandhar, a former Senior Software Engineer at Siemens Nixdorf in the United States. Recognizing the transformative potential of the Internet, Manandhar identified three critical prerequisites for its establishment in Nepal: selecting appropriate technologies, arranging peering partnerships for electronic traffic exchange, and establishing network connectivity within the country.

Manandhar's technical expertise, developed since his undergraduate years at MIT in 1985, played a significant role in this initiative. Manandhar partnered with SatelLife, a nonprofit organization, based in Cambridge, MA, USA, offering access to low-Earth orbit satellite technology. Although the satellite provided limited bandwidth (90 KB every 90 minutes), Manandhar supplemented this with a sophisticated modem, the Telebit Worldblazer, capable of functioning around noisy international phone lines.

Manandhar arrived in Nepal with a Compaq laptop serving as the primary server and additional modems donated by SatelLife. He installed Nepal's first Internet service at Tribhuvan Teaching Hospital, establishing "HealthNet Nepal" as a nonprofit organization to promote the use of the Internet in the medical field.

To ensure sustainability, Manandhar formed a Steering Committee to manage HealthNet as a nonprofit Internet Service Provider (ISP). Alongside these efforts, he trained local engineers to support the system's maintenance and expansion. HealthNet successfully provided email services and laid the foundation for further Internet development in Nepal.

Later in 1994, Sanjay Manandhar collaborated with Sanjib Rajbhandari, a fellow-alumnus of St. Xavier's School, Kathmandu, to fully operationalize Mercantile Office Systems (MOS) as an ISP. Over the next few months, Manandhar trained a team of Nepali engineers, to set up and maintain the necessary infrastructure. By early 1995, MOS had become operational, offering world-class Internet services in Nepal.

Manandhar also considered additional ventures, such as a fax gateway service, which leveraged cost differences between local and international communications to provide businesses with a cost-effective solution. By March 1995, having established two ISPs and the fax gateway company, Manandhar decided to return to the West, leaving Nepal's nascent Internet industry to continue its growth.

The pioneering work of Sanjay Manandhar and his collaborators laid the groundwork for the expansion of Internet services in Nepal, transforming communication and access to information in the country.

== Legal and regulatory frameworks ==
Nepal's legal system is in flux because of its unstable political landscape and its new constitution. The most recent collapse occurred in February 2005, when the king assumed control of the government and armed forces. Mass civilian protests followed, and he was forced to reinstate parliament and ultimately relinquish all official powers to the prime minister and parliament. The king sought to stifle the independent media during his tenure, passing the repressive Media Law, which prohibited criticism of the king and royal family and the broadcast of news over independent FM radio stations (an important source of independent news in the country). The Media Law also increased the penalties for defamation tenfold. The law was repealed once parliament was reinstated.

In December 2006, seven political parties and the Maoists agreed on a new interim constitution that paves the way for the Maoists to join the political mainstream and nationalizes royal properties, leaving the fate of the monarchy up to a general election. The interim constitution guarantees certain social freedoms including freedom of speech and expression, freedom to protest, and freedom to establish a political party, among others. The constitution also guarantees the freedom to publish, including a specifically enumerated freedom to publish on the Internet. It advises, however, that those who publish information that causes social disruption or disparages others may be subject to punishment under relevant laws.

One such law is likely the Electronic Transaction and Digital Signature Act of 2004 (ETDSA), which regulates online commerce and financial transactions and criminalizes certain online behavior, including hacking and fraud. ETDSA also provides criminal penalties, including fines and up to five years in prison, for the publication of "illegal" content on the Internet (though it provides no definition of illegal content), or for the publication of hate speech or speech likely to trigger ethnic strife. Similarly, the National Broadcasting Act of 1993 and the National Broadcasting Regulation of 1995 provide for fines and/or imprisonment for broadcasting content likely to cause ethnic strife or social unrest, undermine national security or moral decency, or conflict with Nepali foreign policy.

However, the extent to which any previously existing laws will retain their force under the new government is unclear. The Government of Nepal has banned pornographic sites from September 21, 2018.

== Filtering ==
From October 2006 through January 2007, the OpenNet Initiative conducted testing on six Nepali ISPs (Worldlink, Everest, Mercantile, Nepal Telecom, Speedcast, and Websurfer) to detect possible Internet filtering (censorship). The tests revealed no evidence of filtering.
