= List of internet service providers in Nepal =

According to the latest data (2024), there are 62 broadband Internet service providers in Nepal. All those are including new and old internet service providers which are active in the operation across various parts of Nepal. While majority of Nepali ISP's use Fiber To The Home (FTTH) technology, some are upgrading their legacy Cable/DSL/Wireless networks to Fiber.

== By subscribers ==
Here is the list of top 10 internet service provider companies by number of subscribers as on Mid October, 2025.

Rank	ISP name	Logo	Subscribers (Dec 2024)	Market Share				
Rank	ISP name	Logo	Subscribers (Dec 2024)	Market Share	1	WorldLink Communications	1,053,035	30.94%
2	DishHome		383,816	11.28%				
3	Nepal Telecom		377,094	11.08%				
4	Vianet Communications		346,177	10.17%				
5	Classic tech		272,500	8.01%				
6	Subisu		257,234	7.56%				
7	Websurfer		175,178	5.15%				
8	Techminds		123,331	3.62%				
9	Wifi Nepal		99,264	2.92%				
10	CG Communications		85,713	2.52%				
11	Others		2,29,698	6.75%				
Total			3,402,932	100%				
Source:NTA

== See also ==
- Nepal Telecommunications Authority
