= Internet censorship in Malawi =

The government of Malawi does not systematically filter or block Internet content. However, the government has blocked access to news sites and social media in isolated incidents in efforts to quell protests.

Internet access is limited by high cost and lack of infrastructure. In July 2013, the government reinstated a 16.5% VAT tax on Internet services. Consequently, mobile phone Internet providers raised tariffs by 16-25 percent, and many internet cafes increased their rates from MWK 5 per minute to between MWK 15-20 per minute.

There have been no reports of content removal and service providers are not held liable for content transmitted through their networks. However, online journalists are periodically detained and prosecuted for articles posted on news websites. In November 2013, for example, Justice Mponda, a correspondent for the online publication Malawi Voice, was arrested for allegedly “intimidating the royal family” due to an investigative story he had written.

Malawi law prohibits the publication or transmission of anything "that could be useful to the enemy", as well as religiously offensive and obscene material. Malawi participates in regional efforts to combat cybercrime: the East African Community (consisting of Kenya, Tanzania, and Uganda) and the South African Development Community (consisting of Malawi, Mozambique, South Africa, Zambia, and Zimbabwe) have both enacted plans to standardize cybercrime laws throughout their regions. There is a Malawi Censorship Board, but its primary function is the review of books.

According to International Telecommunication Union statistics for 2009, approximately 4.7 percent of the country's inhabitants used the Internet. In August 2009 the Malawi Internet Service Providers' Association (MISPA) listed 35 licensed ISPs (21 OK or operational, 14 not operational). The Malawi Internet Exchange (MIX) became operational in December 2008.

== Recent Developments ==
In recent years, the Malawian government has faced accusations of interfering with internet services, particularly on social media platforms like Facebook and WhatsApp, during periods of political tension. For example, during the 2019 elections, a nationwide network outage was reported, leading to concerns that connectivity was intentionally disrupted to limit the spread of information. Although the government denied this, reports suggest that authorities applied direct pressure on internet service providers (ISPs) to shut down their networks.

As of early 2024, internet penetration reached 27.7 per cent of the population. Despite this growth, internet access remains limited by high costs and poor infrastructure, creating a significant digital divide between urban and rural areas.
