= Internet in Taiwan =

The Internet in Taiwan is widely accessible, highly developed, and plays a critical role in daily life, commerce, and governance in the country. It has one of the highest penetration rates in Asia and advanced digital infrastructure including fiber‑optic networks, 5G connectivity, undersea cables, and emerging satellite backup systems. According to Taiwan’s National Communications Commission (NCC), the number of internet users in Taiwan exceeded 22 million in 2023, representing more than 95% of the population with regular access to the internet.

== History ==
The history of the Internet in Taiwan began in the academic and research sectors before expanding to the general public. In 1990, the Ministry of Education established the Taiwan Academic Network (TANet), creating the first permanent link between Taiwan’s research community and the global internet. TANet initially connected major universities such as National Taiwan University and National Yang Ming Chiao Tung University, enabling email, file transfers, and early web services primarily for academic purposes. On 3 December 1991, a 64 kbit/s data connection to JvNCnet in Princeton University, United States was made. It was Taiwan's first international network connection. By the mid‑1990s, commercial Internet service providers (ISPs) emerged as demand spread beyond academia. Hinet, operated by Chunghwa Telecom, launched in 1994 as the country’s first major commercial ISP, quickly followed by SEEDNet, TFN, and others. Most households and businesses at that time accessed the internet via dial‑up modems, typically at speeds of 14.4 or 28.8 kbit/s, before upgrading to 56 kbit/s as the technology matured. Early adopters were concentrated in Taipei and other urban centers, where telephone infrastructure was strongest.

The government of Taiwan began actively promoting broadband infrastructure in the late 1990s as part of broader economic modernization policies. ADSL services were introduced in 1998, and by the early 2000s, broadband quickly displaced dial‑up. In 1999, Taiwan officially became a member of the Internet Corporation for Assigned Names and Numbers. In 2001, the government launched the “National Broadband Initiative” to increase household penetration and support the country’s growing information technology (IT) sector. Fiber‑to‑the‑home (FTTH) deployments began in the mid‑2000s, with Chunghwa Telecom and competitors rolling out high-speed services in dense urban districts.

Parallel to fixed-line growth, mobile data services expanded. 3G networks became available in 2003, paving the way for mobile internet access on early smartphones. By 2014, all major operators had rolled out 4G LTE networks, and usage skyrocketed with the spread of social media, video streaming, and mobile payments. Taiwan moved into the 5G era in July 2020, when the NCC auctioned 5G spectrum licenses and leading carriers—Chunghwa Telecom, Taiwan Mobile, and FarEasTone—began commercial service in major cities.

Government initiatives also shaped public access. In 2011, the Executive Yuan launched iTaiwan, a nationwide free Wi‑Fi network available at government offices, train stations, and tourist sites. This initiative complemented local programs such as Taipei Free, making public Wi‑Fi nearly ubiquitous in metropolitan areas.

== Penetration and Usage ==
As of early 2025, approximately 22.1 million people in Taiwan, or 95.3% of the population, were internet users, up from 2.05% of the population in 1996. Daily engagement is robust, with 90.7% of the population using the internet regularly and a mobile connection rate exceeding 128%, indicating widespread multi-device use.

== Infrastructure and Speed ==
=== Fixed broadband ===
Taiwan’s fixed broadband infrastructure is dominated by Chunghwa Telecom but also features competition from operators such as Taiwan Mobile, FarEasTone, and Asia Pacific Telecom. Fixed broadband penetration in Taiwan stood at 69.9% in 2024, with the median download speeds to be estimated to be around 190 Mbit/s. Over 45% of connections offer 100–500 Mbit/s, and 13.5% are gigabit‑level. In terms of costs, a 1 Gbit/s plan now costs around NT$1,899 (~USD $61) as of 2025, down from NT$2,399 the previous year. Fiber-optic networks have been deployed extensively, with average fixed broadband speeds surpassing 200 Mbit/s in 2023. According to a report by Statista, Taiwan was ranked first in the world in terms of broadband download speeds in 2023.

=== Mobile broadband ===
Mobile penetration is high, with 86.4% mobile broadband penetration and 5G coverage expanding since 2020. Following the rollout of nationwide 4G LTE networks in 2014, Taiwan launched 5G services in July 2020, with all major carriers offering 5G coverage in major cities and expanding to rural townships. As of late 2023, 26.8% of connections were 5G, totaling over 8 million users, with median mobile download speeds up to 82 Mbit/s.

=== Undersea Cables ===
Taiwan’s geographic position as a hub in East Asia has also encouraged investment in undersea cables. Taiwan is connected internationally by 14 undersea fiber-optic cables, including connections to Japan, Hong Kong, the Philippines, and the United States, ensuring robust international bandwidth. In 2023, cables to the Matsu Islands were severed by sabotage from China, which prompted rapid satellite and microwave backup deployment.

=== Low Earth orbit satellites ===
Satellite backup via Low Earth orbit (OneWeb) began rolling out in late 2024. Taiwan has approved a NT$27 billion project to develop 6G wireless technology and build domestic Low Earth orbit (LEO) satellite systems by 2030.

== Governance and Regulation ==
Internet services in Taiwan are regulated by the National Communications Commission (NCC), an independent statutory agency that oversees telecommunications and broadcasting. The NCC sets standards for service quality, allocates spectrum for mobile networks, and enforces consumer protection measures.

Taiwan’s internet is also notable for its strong freedom of expression compared to many other jurisdictions in Asia. The government does not impose large-scale censorship; websites and social media platforms like Facebook, YouTube, Instagram, and X (formerly Twitter) operate freely. However, the NCC actively monitors telecommunications security and collaborates with industry partners to counter cyber threats, disinformation campaigns, and data breaches.

== Challenges ==
Despite its advanced infrastructure, Taiwan faces challenges such as the digital divide between urban and rural areas, where broadband speeds and affordability can differ significantly. Efforts are ongoing to ensure remote communities in mountainous and offshore island regions receive equal access to high-speed networks.

Cybersecurity has also emerged as a key concern, with Taiwan experiencing frequent cyberattacks attributed to both criminal groups and state-sponsored actors. In response, the government has bolstered its National Information and Communication Security Taskforce and promoted public-private collaboration on cyber resilience.

== See also ==
- Telecommunications in Taiwan
- National Communications Commission
- Economy of Taiwan
- Internet censorship in Taiwan
