= Internet access in Tanzania =

Overview of internet in Tanzania

Internet access in Tanzania, a country in East Africa, began in 1995. Within 5 years, 115,000 people were connected to the Internet. Since then, there has been significant growth.

== Statistics ==
In June 2010, a Tanzania Communications Regulatory Authority review found that internet penetration was approximately 11%, or approximately 4.8 million Tanzanian users. 5% of those used internet cafes, 40% had access via an organisation or institution, and the remainder accessed the internet from a household connection. By 2014, there were twice as many users using the Internet for personal reasons than work reasons. By 2015, about 11% of households in Tanzania had internet access. The CIA World Factbook assessed internet penetration in 2016 at 13%. By mid-2017, the TCRA's figures were that 40% of Tanzania's 57 million population had internet access, due mainly to an increase in smartphone access. In contrast, there were 1.2 million fixed wireless connections and 629,474 fixed wired ones.

In December 2023, UNESCO reported on the digital gender gap in Tanzania, highlighting a disparity in mobile phone ownership: 77% of women versus 86% of men. This gap extends to internet access, with only 17% of women having mobile internet access compared to 35% of men. These statistics underscore initiatives like 'Empowering Adolescent Girls and Young Women through Education in Tanzania', which provides smartphones and digital literacy training to young women, aiming to enhance their internet skills and access.
