= Internet in Romania =

In Romania, there are 18.8 million connections to the Internet (June 2016). Romania's country code (top level domain) is .ro. The .eu domain is also used, as it is shared with other European Union member states. There were over 600 000 domains registered under .ro at the end of 2012.

== Average speed ==
Internet usage skyrocketed in Romania after 1999, with small neighborhood Internet service providers that were affordable and with high speeds, bypassing use of copper wires or dial-up methods. This coupled with low population and land mass helps with keeping up a high average speed

According to a top made by Akamai in Q3 2016, Romania was ranked 10th in the world in terms of average Internet peak connection speed with 85 Mbit/s. In Akamai's The State of the Internet Report covering the fourth quarter of 2012, Romania came 4th on average peak connection speed by EMEA country/region.

In 2021, Romania ranked 5th in the world in terms of Internet connection via fixed broadband, having median download speeds of 214 Mbit/s.

== Download speed ==
Based on Net Index report at the end of first half of 2013, Timișoara became the city with the highest download speed in the world. Timișoara had a download speed of 89.91 Mbit/s. The second Romanian city which appeared in the ranking was Constanța, in 14th place, with a speed of 34.45 Mbit/s. The capital Bucharest came 19th, with speeds of 33.57 Mbit/s, and Brașov, 27th, with 31.01 Mbit/s. World City Ranking requires at least 75,000 unique IP addresses for a given city.

Based on Net Index data from April 2015, Cristești is the Romanian town with the fastest internet speed of 139.12 Mbit/s. This is surprising giving the fact that major cities are usually ranked lower on the list, Bucharest being listed at number 6 and Iași is present in 9th position. Romania is one of the countries with the fastest fixed internet connection speeds and also one of the cheapest, with 1 Gbit/s internet connections being sold for around 8 euros a month.

== Internet service providers ==
Total number of active providers, as of June, 2017: 871

- Twisted pair Ethernet, satellite, other: 655 providers
- Coaxial cable (cable modem) Access: 27 providers,
- Optical fiber access: 164 providers,
- xDSL access: 5 providers.

== Broadband Internet access ==
Broadband penetration as of June 2017: 23.5 broadband connections for every 100 people.

Distribution of broadband connections by type, as reported by Ancom, is as follows: 94% FTTx (FTTH/FTTB/FTTC/FTTN) internet access connections, 4.8% coaxial cable and 0.2% other.

In Romania, broadband internet has been available since 2000, through coaxial cable, first from Kappa (now owned by UPC) and currently from DIGI and UPC. Recent speeds range between 10 Mbit/s and 1000 Mbit/s for household targeted plans, and the data traffic is unmetered.

However, the most popular broadband services are provided by micro-ISPs (known locally as "rețea de bloc/rețea de cartier" (block/neighborhood networks)) with 50 to 3000 customers each. These ISPs usually provide their services through Ethernet over twisted pair, with a number of particularities and peculiarities: most were grassroot organizations and still have a feeling of community between subscribers and the management, speeds are usually divided in three categories: "LAN", "Metropolitan" and "International" with Metropolitan meaning a limited number of networks with which the micro-ISP has a peering agreement and sometimes the cable internet providers. Generally, for such broadband connections, speeds are 1000 Mbit/s locally, 1-100 Mbit/s metro and 256-2048 kbit/s International. Some of these micro-ISP function completely legally, while others (generally the smaller ones) are organized informally and are similar to a permanent LAN party. Many of these micro-ISPs formed organizations to represent their common interests and provide for integration of services (one such organization is Interlan, covering the whole of Bucharest). Speeds, uptime, quality of service are generally not guaranteed, and while the biggest networks offer high quality connections and 30 Mbit/s upload international technical support, for the smallest ones, there is even the risk of network cards burning because of lightning strikes and badly insulated network infrastructure.

For business use, services are usually provided through fiber optics or, less often, radio. Companies providing such services are providing very flexible and negotiable plans also based on the Metropolitan/International distinction. Usually prices and bandwidths are fully negotiable, with the micro-ISPs discussed above being influential resellers. There is very strong competition, with no peering between many such companies (again requiring a lot of traffic to be routed through international routes) and not even access to another's fiber-optics infrastructure (leading to the existence, in some cases, of over 25 fiber optics cables on the same street, hanging from the same pole). As such many companies have two separate providers for basically the same services.

DSL has been an option since late 1990s but is a less popular choice compared to the other offers because it is slightly more expensive. It has a great coverage (more than 650 cities and towns). Nowadays most other providers prefer to use optical fiber.

=== Cable ===
Usually, in order to be able to get an internet subscription through cable, the customers must also subscribe to a TV service.

=== FTTB ===
Romtelecom was approached by T-Mobile and now it is known as Telekom (Partnership between Cosmote and Romtelecom).

DIGI launched in 2006 FiberLink, an optic fiber-based internet subscription geared towards supporting and encouraging the large demand for cheap metropolitan traffic. Most of DIGI's cable infrastructure immediately began being replaced by the newer FTTB, and as of late 2006, DIGI started expanding the service by acquiring and converting the popular "neighborhood networks" of the urban areas.

Telekom now offers FTTH connections as well.

=== FTTH ===
DIGI offers their FiberLink service to residential customers in individual homes through a GPON implementation, with gigabit speeds. The service is available to residential customers in condominiums if they opt for FL500 or FL1000 even if a FTTB solution already exists. The Internet subscription packages are the same as for the FTTB.

=== Mobile and wireless ===
Usually, a subscription plan includes a certain amount of data traffic per month, after which the user is limited to 128 kbit/s download speeds.

Orange Romania offers a 3G/3G+ service with speeds of up to 43.2 Mbit/s in a limited number of cities and up to 21.6 Mbit/s in rural areas (on 900 and 2100 MHz frequencies). Since April 2014 their offer was updated to include subscriptions for 4G. Since September 2014 they introduced 4G+ with speeds up to 300 Mbit/s. There is also active 5G service with speeds up to 1200 Mbit/s.

Vodafone Romania also uses 3G/3G+ technologies, with speeds of up to 43.2 Mbit/s in big cities and up to 21.6 Mbit/s nationwide (on 900 and 2100 MHz frequencies). In 2012 they were the first operator to offer 4G subscriptions with the speeds gradually increased from 75 to 150 Mbit/s. On 8 September 2014, Vodafone announced its new technology: Supernet 4G, more often known as 4G+, which promises internet speeds of 300 Mbit/s using the mobile network. According to OpenSignal report on 24 September 2015, Vodafone Romania is the fastest internet provider of LTE services in Europe with an average 36 Mbit/s for download. Vodafone Romania was the first to launch 5G services in Romania, promising speeds of up to 500 Mbit/s in large cities.

DIGI (formerly known as RCS&RDS) provides 3G internet with speeds of up to 21.6 Mbit/s in the main cities and up to 7.2 Mbit/s on the main roads (on 900 and 2100 MHz frequencies). Wired internet subscribers with superior plans also receive a free 3G internet dongle and service. Since June 2014, an agreement with Vodafone allows the users of DIGI services to do national roaming for both voice and data, using the infrastructure of Vodafone in places where DIGI does not have coverage. On 20 August 2015, DIGI announced that they acquired a LTE license that was previously owned by 2K Telekom Romania SRL. With no specific launched date, DIGI promised that its 4G services will be available in the largest 25 cities across the country until the end of the year, with the first 12 cities access in September. The license acquired is for Band38 - LTE; TDD-LTE on 2600 MHz with a maximum download speed of 150 Mbit/s. Telekom Romania provides 3G internet with speeds of up to 43.2 Mbit/s in urban areas on 2100 MHz and EDGE in rural areas on 900 MHz. Since 2013 they introduced 4G with speeds up to 150 Mbit/s. In 2019, one day after Vodafone, DIGI announced their 5G infrastructure.

WiMAX services are offered by companies like Idilis, OpticNET, Necc Telecom and Rombit NET. Speeds go up to 6 Mbit/s download and 1 Mbit/s upload, with unmetered traffic. Some providers are resellers or share the same radio infrastructure.

=== Public Wi-Fi hotspots ===
DIGI launched the Digi Wi-Fi service in 2011. It is free to use by all DIGI wired internet subscribers, and free for up to 60 minutes per day for guests. There are no paid plans available.

Vodafone Romania launched the Vodafone Wi-Fi service in 2012. It allows free connections for up to 60 minutes, after which the user is disconnected. A new free connection can be made again, after the time is up.

Orange Romania offers free Wi-Fi hotspots in Bucharest's old center under the Orange Wi-Fi Zone brand since 2011.

CityNet and the vice mayor of Botoșani, Cosmin Andrei, launched a new service offering free Wi-Fi hotspots in more than 30 locations at Summer Fest 2013, covering places such as schools, public parks, hospitals and landmark buildings. Promises were also made to extend in the near future.

== See also ==
- Internet censorship in Romania
- RoEduNet
