= Human rights in Nauru =

Nauru is a small island country in the South Pacific. With a population of 13,649, it is the world's least populous independent republic. Nauru's government operates under its constitution, part two of which contains 'protection of fundamental rights and freedoms.' The Human Rights Council (UNHRC) carried out Nauru's Universal Periodic Review (UPR) in January 2011. The review was generally favourable with only a few areas of concern.

== Human rights treaties ==
Nauru became a member of the United Nations on 14 September 1999. Of the nine core human rights treaties Nauru has ratified or acceded to four — the UN Convention on the Rights of the Child (UNCRC), the Convention on the Elimination of All Forms of Discrimination Against Women (CEDAW), the Convention Against Torture (CAT), and the Convention on the Rights of Persons with Disabilities (CRPD). Nauru signed the International Covenant on Civil and Political Rights (ICCPR) and its First Optional Protocol on 12 November 2001 but is yet ratify that. Nauru stated that the burden of reporting, specifically the financial cost, was a significant factor behind their low rate of participation in international human rights instruments.

Due to Australia's use of the Nauru Detention Centre for housing asylum seekers, and in response to many recommendations from other states and human rights monitoring bodies, in June 2011, Nauru ratified the 1951 Convention relating to the Status of Refugees . Nauru also acceded to the OPCAT on 24 January 2013.

== Women's rights ==
Domestic violence is a systemic problem in Nauru and was referred to frequently throughout the UPR report. In response Nauru accepted recommendations to ratify CEDAW and drew attention to several already existing measures. The elimination of domestic violence has been a national priority since 2002 when the government created the Women's Affairs Office. In 2008 the Nauruan Police Force received funding to establish a Domestic Violence Unit and safe-house for victims. International Women's Day is a national holiday. The Nauru Crimes Act 2016, has made domestic violence and revenge pornography a criminal offence since May 2016.

== LGBT rights ==
The May 2016 passage of the Crimes Act 2016 replaced the Nauruan Criminal Code 1899, removed any criminal penalties for sexual activity between consenting adults of the same sex in private.

== Reforms ==
=== Proposed constitutional amendments ===
In 2009 the Nauruan Parliament passed a bill to amend part II of the Constitution. The amendment proposed extending the protection of the rights of disabled persons, the environment and children as well as recognizing the right to receive healthcare, education and maternity leave in the Constitution. The amendment failed to gain the required two-thirds approval in a referendum held on 27 February 2010. The Constitutional Review Committee, a Standing Committee of Parliament, aims to explore alternative formats for a subsequent referendum.

=== Crimes Act 2016 ===
In May 2016, Nauru implemented a new Crimes Act 2016, that modernized the criminal justice system of Nauru and bring it in line with the Universal Declaration of Human Rights.

== National human rights institution ==
Nauru has no national human rights institution. However, in November 2009 Nauru invited a delegation to visit the country and advise the government on the potential establishment of a national human rights mechanism. Delegates included representatives from the Asia Pacific Forum and the Office of the United Nations High Commissioner for Human Rights (OHCHR). Several states noted in the UPR that since the delegation Nauru had not taken further steps to establish a human rights institution and recommended that this be addressed. Nauru accepted these recommendations but cited resources and expertise as their 'biggest obstacles' in pursuit of this goal and stated that the funding of other institutions took precedence.
