= Russian censorship =

Russian censorship can refer to:

- Censorship in the Russian Empire
- Censorship in the Soviet Union
- Censorship in the Russian Federation
  - Russian government censorship of Chechnya coverage
  - Internet censorship in Russia
