= Telecommunications in Taiwan =

Telecommunications in Taiwan comprise the following communication media, deployed in the Taiwan Area of the Republic of China and regulated by the National Communications Commission of the Executive Yuan.

Since the mid-1970s there has been an accelerating shift from traditional personal services (small shops and restaurants) to modern personal services (department stores and hotels) and modern commercial services (finance and communications).

Domestic television has long carried many foreign programs, and liberalization of import restrictions in the 1980s brought more.

There are about 30 daily newspapers and thousands of periodicals, many of the latter house organs of various political and non-political organizations. The government sets general guidelines for the political and cultural content of newspapers and periodicals. There are three television stations and about 30 radio broadcasting companies with more than 180 stations.

== Early history ==
In 1877 telecommunications was first introduced to Taiwan (ROC) as a result of the global expansion and influence of Western technological development and economic systems. This development can be classified within the Second Industrial Revolution, or in other words the Technological Revolution. More specifically, the first telegraph line was constructed in Southern Taiwan. Within a decade over 2,200 km of telegraph lines were constructed and in service throughout Taiwan. Up until World War II, this Technological Revolution initiated the groundbreaking development of different mass communication and production methods around the world. Innovations such as the wire telegraph, the wireless telegraph, and the telephone were the first to spread to China and Taiwan. At this time the Qing dynasty governed Taiwan (1683 - 1895), and they invested in this industry by establishing communication lines across the nation—first for the military and then for the general public. The end of this early period can be marked by the annexation of Taiwan to Japan in 1895, in which after Japan introduced large scale modernization efforts.

== Telephony ==
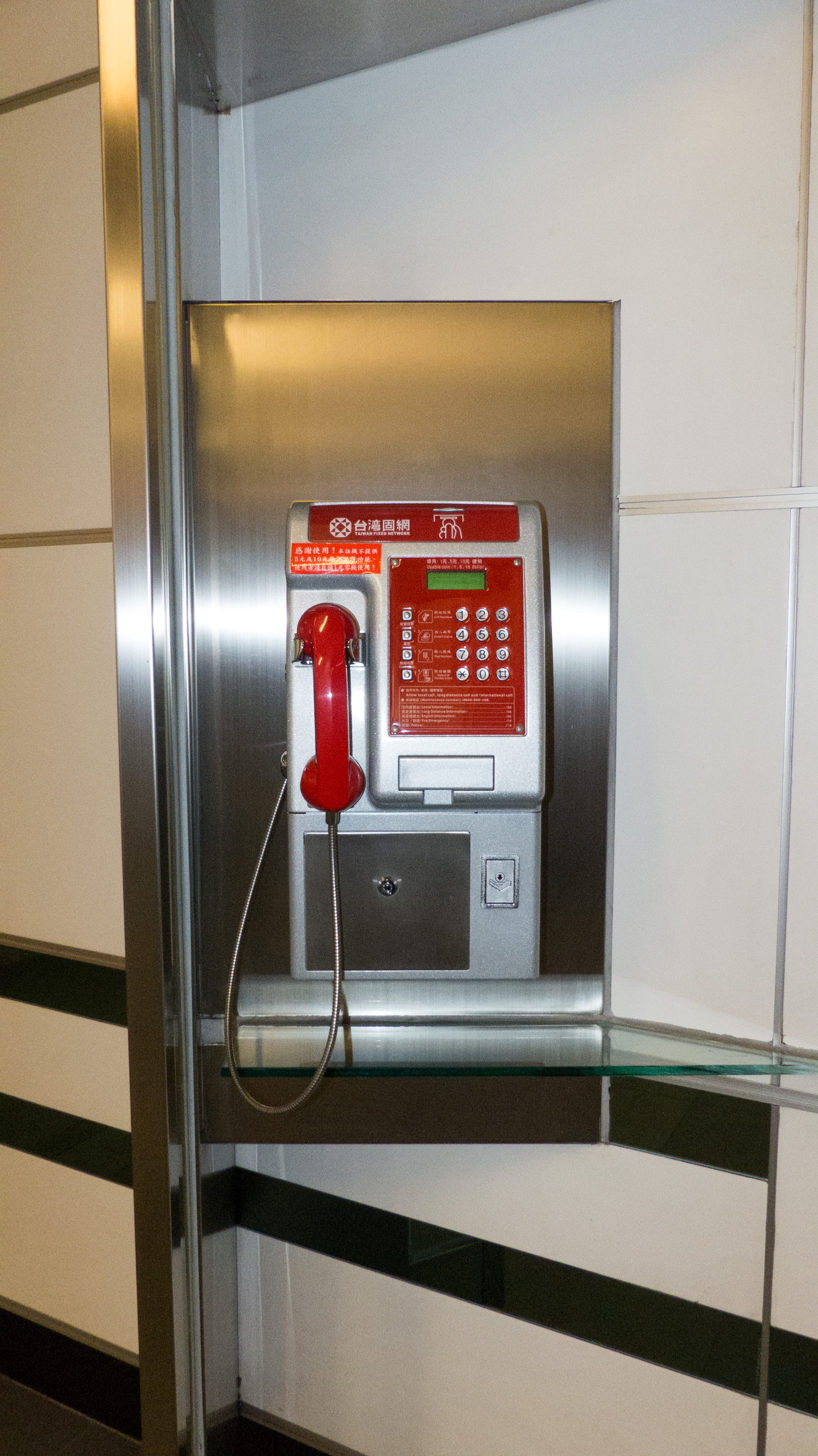
Public telephone in Taiwan

Telephones – main lines in use: 16.433 million (2009)

Telephones – mobile cellular: 27.84 million (2009)

Telephone system:
general assessment: provides telecommunication service for every business and private need
domestic: thoroughly modern; completely digitalized
international: satellite earth stations – 2 Intelsat (1 Pacific Ocean and 1 Indian Ocean); submarine cables to Japan (Okinawa), Philippines, Guam, Singapore, Hong Kong, Indonesia, Australia, Middle East, and Western Europe (1999)

- Fixed network operators: Taiwan Fixed Network, Chunghwa Telecom
- Major cellular operators: Taiwan Mobile, Chunghwa Telecom, FarEasTone

The Directorate General of Telecommunications held a monopoly over phone usage until the July 1996 passage of the Telecommunications Act, when the government began permitting private companies to enter the market. When restrictions were relaxed in 1997, seven percent of people had cell phones. By 2000, the rate of coverage increased to 75 percent. Telecommunications companies that began offering services shortly after the Telecommunications Act went into effect included: Far EasTone, Mobitai, TransAsia Telecommunications, Chunghwa Telecom, KG Telecommunications, Tung Jung Telecom and Taiwan Mobile. Tung Jung merged into KG in December 1998, then was bought out by Far EasTone in 2010. Taiwan Mobile acquired Mobitai in 2004, and TransAsia in 2008.

== Radio ==
Radio broadcast stations: AM 218, FM 333, shortwave 50 (1999)

Radios: 16 million (1994)

== Television ==
Television broadcast stations: 29 (plus two repeaters) (1997)

Televisions: 8.8 million (1998)

Broadcast media: 5 nationwide television networks operating roughly 75 TV stations; about 85% of households utilize multi-channel cable TV; national and regional radio networks with about 170 radio stations (2008)

== Internet ==
See for more: Country code (Top level domain)TW.

statical	years
Internet service providers (ISPs): 15	(1999)
Internet hosts:6.166 million	(2010)
Internet users:16.147 million	(2009)

=== Broadband internet access ===
See for rankings: List of countries by number of broadband Internet subscriptions

The number of broadband subscribers in Taiwan surpassed 4.5 million by the end of March 2007. This number is approximately 20% of the total population.

=== Internet censorship ===
There are no government restrictions on access to the Internet or credible reports that the authorities surveil the e-mail or telecommunication chat rooms without appropriate legal authority.

The constitution and law provide for freedom of speech and press, and the government respects these rights in practice. An independent press, an effective judiciary, and a functioning democratic political system combine to protect freedom of speech and press. Individual groups engage in the peaceful expression on views via the Internet, including via the e-mail.

In accordance to a survey conducted by Taiwan's Institute for Information Industry, an NGO, 81.8% of households had Internet access at the end of 2011.

The websites of PRC institutions such as the Chinese Communist Party, People's Daily, and China Central Television can be freely accessed from Taiwan.

However, in April 2019, Mainland Affairs Council deputy minister Chiu Chui-cheng stated that the country was planning to restrict the Chinese video services iQiyi and Tencent Video in the lead-up to the 2020 Taiwan presidential election, fearing that the services could be used to create "cultural and political influences" by China and impact the vote (such as by disseminating pro-China propaganda).

== Major players: companies ==
=== ChungHwa Telecom, CHT ===
ChungHwa Telecom is the largest telecommunications company in Taiwan, originally established as a government-owned entity before being privatized in 2005. ChungHwa Telecom underwent a gradual transition from a state-owned enterprise to a privatized entity, with over 50% of its shares held by private owners by 2005. The company's privatization was intended to enhance competitiveness in a liberalized market, yet issues such as bureaucratic inefficiencies, cultural resistance, and stock sale complications hindered a smooth transition. Privatization allowed for technological advancements and increased market responsiveness which allowd the company to expand beyond traditional voice and data services to include mobile communications, interactive multimedia, and digital content platforms, such as its MOD (Multimedia on Demand) service. Chunghwa Telecom's business strategy aligns with the concept of “multiple screens and a cloud,” allowing users to access content across various devices. A key factor in its competitive edge is its patent portfolio, which focuses on data switching networks, secure communication, and digital TV, among other areas. Following privatization, the company adapted its patent strategy by considering whether innovations should remain trade secrets, be commercialized, or be filed internationally. ChungHwa Telecom was able to become the largest telecommunications company in Taiwan through these methods.

== See also ==
- List of companies of Taiwan
- Defense industry of Taiwan
- Censorship in Taiwan
- Media of Taiwan
