= Internet censorship in Romania =

Internet censorship in Romania is mainly related to the filtering of sites with pornographic content hosted in Romania.

Although several proposals have been made to censor pornographic sites, so far not one site has been blocked.

Some non licensed gambling are blocked in Romania.

Due to EU's Digital Service, X, Bluesky and Vimeo that feature harmful content like pornography are required with ID to verify the user's age by July 2025.

== Legislation ==
The Law on Prevention and Combat of Pornography (No. 196/2003) says that all pornographic sites must be accessible only after entering a password and after the patron paid a tax per minute of access. Also, such activities must be authorised by a commission of the Ministry of Culture and Cults, which will include representatives of the Ministry of Interior and the Ministry of Communications and Information Technology. All sites which feature paedophilia, necrophilia and zoophilia pornography are banned.

The sites which do not respect this law may be added to a black list by the National Authority of Regulation in Communications and the ISPs which do not filter out the sites in the list within 48 hours will be fined 10,000-50,000 lei (3,400-17,000 USD). The sites are added to the black list after denounces from private citizens, sites which are then verified by the Authority.

== Blocking of pornographic sites proposal ==
On 11 December 2008, the National Authority for Communications proposed to block 40 sites under the anti-pornographic law, all of which were hosted in Romania. The list of sites was not made public, in order to discourage their promotion. The president of authority claimed that these sites were freely accessible, not by a password, as the law requires, and as such, it was possible to be easily accessed by children.

One of the 40 sites proposed for blocking is a site which is not pornographic: 220.ro, one of the biggest video sharing websites in Romania (344,000 unique visitors per week).

As of November 2011, none of the sites have been blocked in Romania and the proposals have been ignored.

== Online forums censorship proposal ==
In August 2010, a social-democratic senator, Lia Olguța Vasilescu, proposed a law to ban the usage of profanity on the internet forums of the Romanian press, requiring the online press to moderate the content. Accused of wanting to protect the politicians from criticism, she replied that the purpose of her law is for the protection of children who might encounter profanity while browsing the internet.

The proposal was largely ignored, and no action was taken.

== Sports betting censorship ==
Online sports betting was illegal in Romania until the Government Emergency Ordinance no. 77/2009 passed in 2009 which legalised online gambling but only with a government-granted license. In 2013 the Romanian National Gambling Office was formed to regulate and license online gambling in Romania.

A total of 18 companies now hold approved status with the government still blocking those without an official license. Whilst the ONJN deem it illegal to bet on unlicensed sites in Romania, they can not restrict access to other informational data present on those sites.

== Social media censorship ==
Due to EU's Digital Service, X, Bluesky and Vimeo that feature harmful content like pornography are required with ID to verify the user's age by July 2025.
