= Internet in Slovenia =

The use of internet in Slovenia is widespread. According to official polls in the first quarter of 2023, 90% of citizens between the ages 16 and 74 have used the internet, 87% daily or almost daily. Smartphones were the most prevalent devices for internet access, used by 87% of users. 94% households had internet access.

The use of the internet for specific purposes (online banking, e-Government services, electronic commerce, reading online newspapers, etc.) is near the average for EU27.

The country's top-level domain is .si. It is administered by ARNES, the Academic and Research Network of Slovenia. The organization also provides access to educational and research institutions. Other major providers are Telekom Slovenije (under the trademark SiOL), Telemach, A1 Slovenija (formerly AMIS, mobile provider also known as Si.Mobil) and T-2. Slovenian ISPs provide ADSL, ADSL2+, VDSL, SHDSL, VDSL2, EuroDOCSIS (mostly provided by Telemach) and FTTH. Internet access points (ADSL/VDSL and FTTH) must be provided by Telekom Slovenije to other internet providers, at a certain fee, regulated by AKOS (Slovenian Telecommunications Agency) as a part of its national service. This ensures fair competition amongst internet providers.

Slovenia is noted as one of the leading European countries by the percentage of users who browse the web using Mozilla Firefox. In 2007, 47.9% of page requests were made with Firefox, more than in any other European country.

== History ==
Allocation of IPv4 Address Space in Slovenia

The first IP connection in the country was established between Jožef Stefan Institute and the Dutch NIKHEF institute in October 1991. The laboratory for open systems and networks at the Jožef Stefan Institute housed the primary domain server for the .yu domain at the time. The .si top-level domain was registered in 1992 after Slovenia gained independence, but the use of .yu TLD continued for several years and only in the second half of the 1990s was the registry transferred to University of Belgrade. Similarly, the use of X.400 and X.25 protocols by ARNES continued for several years due to established European research institutes' preference for ISO/OSI standards.

In a telephone poll of households in 1996, 6.5% of the population declared themselves as internet users, although the number was probably overestimated due to methodological problems.

According to official polls in the first quarter of 2008, 58% of citizens between the ages 10 and 74 were internet users, which is above Europe's average. In the same period, 59% of households (85% of which were through broadband) and 97% of companies with 10 or more employed (84% of those through broadband) had internet access. In 2011, 73% of households had internet access, and 67% of households had broadband. As of 2011, 29% of Slovenians had never used the internet.

== Internet censorship and surveillance ==
There are no government restrictions on access to the internet or credible reports that the government monitors e-mail or chat rooms without appropriate legal authority. The constitution and law provide for freedom of speech and press, and the government generally respects these rights. However, the law prohibits hate speech, including incitement to intolerance as well as violence. The law provides criminal penalties for defamation that harms a person's honor or name. The constitution and laws prohibit arbitrary interference with privacy, family, home, or correspondence and the government generally respects these prohibitions in practice. Individuals and groups freely engage in the expression of views via the internet.

The independent organization Helpline Spletno Oko (Web Eye) monitors the presence of hate speech and child pornography on the internet and received on average 62 reports and tips per month in 2012.

On 28 January 2010, the Slovenian National Assembly adopted changes to the law governing gambling. Under the law, internet service providers are responsible for blocking access to gambling web sites that are not licensed by the Slovenian government.
