= Internet in Algeria =

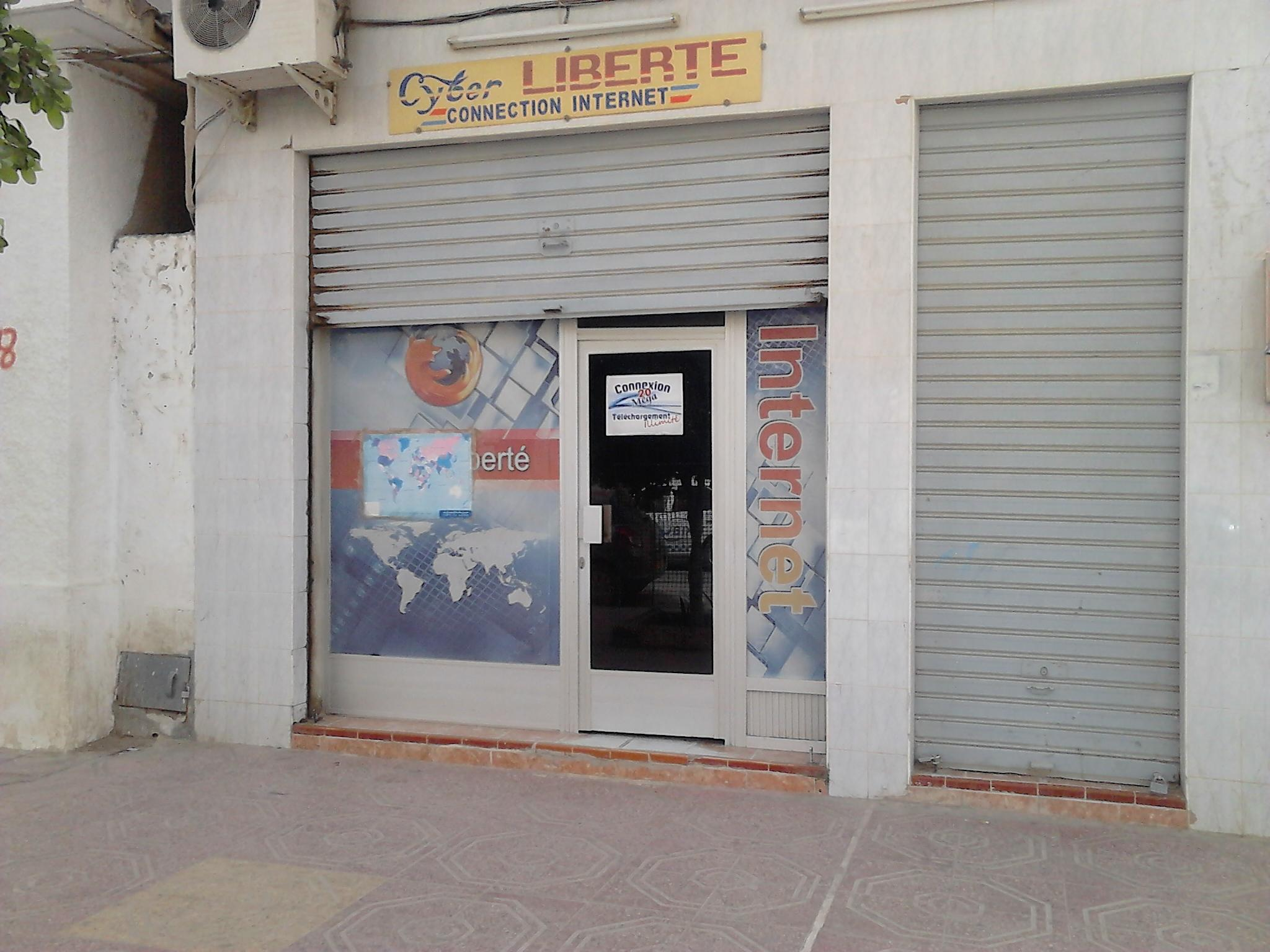
internetcafe in Biskra

Internet use in Algeria increased from 150,000 users in 2006 to approximately 18,583,000 in 2015, with a penetration rate of 46% of the population, In 2008, the government set aside €100 million to provide internet to every high school in the country. The country is also modernising its internet network by installing optical fiber cables, and multi-service access nodes (MSANs) all across the country. The main internet service provider is Algérie Télécom, currently state owned but slated for privatization. In Algeria government regulations permit controls on internet access and monitoring of content. ISPs are responsible for the sites they host, and are required to take “all necessary steps to ensure constant surveillance” of content to prevent access to “material contrary to public order and morality.” These laws are often used against journalists and to prevent antigovernmental activism.

== Internet penetration and ISPs ==
Over the past decade, the number of Internet users in Algeria has greatly increased, from 150,000 users in 2006 to approximately 36,200,000 in 2024. With a penetration rate of 76.9% of the population, due to the increase of internet speeds and lowering of tariffs, as well as the introduction of new telecommunication technologies such as 3G and 4G LTE.

To improve the information and communications technology penetration rate, the government has started a number of initiatives, including its approval in January 2008 of a €100 million plan to implement Internet networks in every high school in the country. The country is also modernising its internet network by installing optical fiber cables, and multi-service access nodes (MSANs) all across the country.

Algeria’s main operator of Internet services and fixed and mobile telephone services is Algérie Télécom. The company has been slated for privatization, but the process has been repeatedly delayed. The firm’s chief executive said in 2008 that the company will be ready for privatization by 2011.

Algérie Télécom launched LTE Services on October 1st, 2016, though it was the first in North Africa to launch an LTE network via Algérie Télécom in 2014.

In 2015, Algérie Télécom launched the WICI service in multiple Algerian cities, which grants the public access to outdoor Wi-Fi.

== Legal and regulatory frameworks ==
Government regulations permit controls on Internet access and monitoring of content. In July 2006, Algerian President Abdelaziz Bouteflika pardoned all journalists convicted of defamation offenses, a move welcomed by local journalists, the International Federation of Journalists (IFJ), and Reporters Without Borders (RSF). However, both the IFJ and RSF demanded long term reforms to protect press freedom, including abolishing the country's defamation laws which, in addition to government dominance over broadcasting, economic constraints, and journalists' lack of access to official information, restrict freedom of expression in Algeria. In addition, in January 2008 the government reinforced its surveillance of the press by placing state-owned printing companies, which print half of Algeria’s privately owned newspapers, under direct government control.

Algerian authorities continue to ignore journalists' repeated calls for revision of the press law to eliminate prison sentences for offenses from the press. Blogger Abd el Salam Baroudy, administrator of the Bilad Telmesan blog, was charged with criminal defamation for criticizing a government official on his blog in June 2007.

In May 2008 the government introduced a new cyber-crime bill amid reports that government websites receive about 4,000 hacking attempts per month and that websites of financial institutions are also targeted by hackers. The bill criminalized online activities such as hacking, data theft, promoting terrorism and crimes online, blackmailing, and copyright infringement. The bill was followed in May 2009 by the creation of a new national security service focused on cyber-crime; police officers were also given explicit permission to “break into, inspect and control” Internet cafés in the interest of preventing terrorist activities.

In 2005 the Algerian government began allowing ISPs to use Voice-over Internet protocol for international calls. State-own telecoms company Algeria Telecom Satellite (ATS) launched VoIP and GPS in September 2008.

== Surveillance and filtering ==
Article 14 of ministerial decree no 98-257 of August 25, 1998 makes ISPs responsible for the sites they host, and requires them to take “all necessary steps to ensure constant surveillance” of content to prevent access to “material contrary to public order and morality.” In 2004, journalists reported that it could take up to two days to receive their e-mails; they believed the government is spying on them.

Algerian security forces started raiding Internet cafés and checking the browsing history of Internet users after terrorist attacks hit the country in April 2007. In April 2008, the security forces increased their monitoring and surveillance efforts in these cafés to stop their use for terrorist activities. In addition, Internet cafés are now required to collect names and ID numbers of their customers and report this information together with any suspicious activities to the police.

In March 2008, the Algerian government ordered domestic mobile phone companies to stop selling anonymous mobile phones and SIM cards. This call was prompted by concerns that mobile phones were used in terrorist attacks in the country.

OpenNet Initiative testing found no evidence that the government filters Internet sites. However, the Algerian security forces blocked access to the website of al-Qaeda in the Islamic Maghreb in October 2007 after there were reports that the organization used the website to recruit minors and to publish its press releases and videos related to terror attacks in Algeria.

The government’s primary forms of control appear to be the access controls and content monitoring regulations already noted.

== See also ==
- Terrestrial fibre optic cable projects in Algeria
- Media of Algeria
