= Vianet Communications =

Nepali internet service provider

Vianet Communications Ltd.
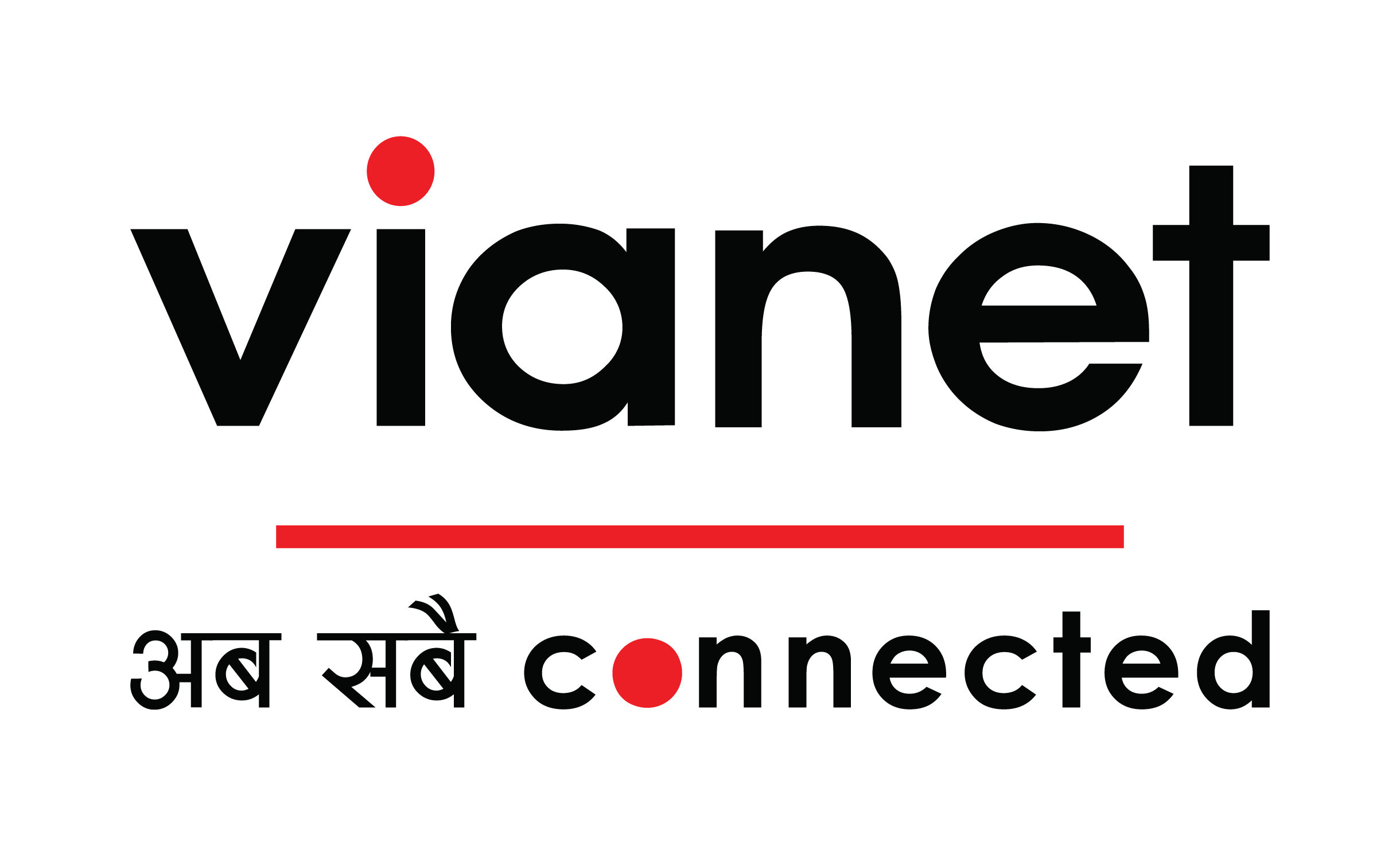
- Native name: भायानेट कम्युनिकेसन (Nepali)
- Type: Private
- Industry: Telecommunications
- Founded: 1999
- Headquarters: Kathmandu, Nepal
- Area served: Nepal
- Key people: Sewa Pathak (CEO)
- Services: Broadband Internet access
- Owners: Binay Bohara
- Number of employees: 1,000+
- Website: vianet.com.np

Vianet Communications (Nepali: भायानेट कम्युनिकेशन) is an internet service provider in Nepal. Vianet is Nepal's third largest internet service providers in Nepal. The company was founded in 1999.

A major ISP, it also has IP TV service with approximately 145,000 subscribers to its Via TV IPTV service. Vianet covers 24 cities of the Nepal's 77 districts. As of 2023, it had around 260,000 fiber to the home customers and 10% of total market share in Nepal.

== See also ==
- List of internet service providers in Nepal
