= Internet in Qatar =

Use of the Internet in Qatar has grown rapidly and is now widespread, but Internet access is also heavily filtered.

== Penetration and usage ==
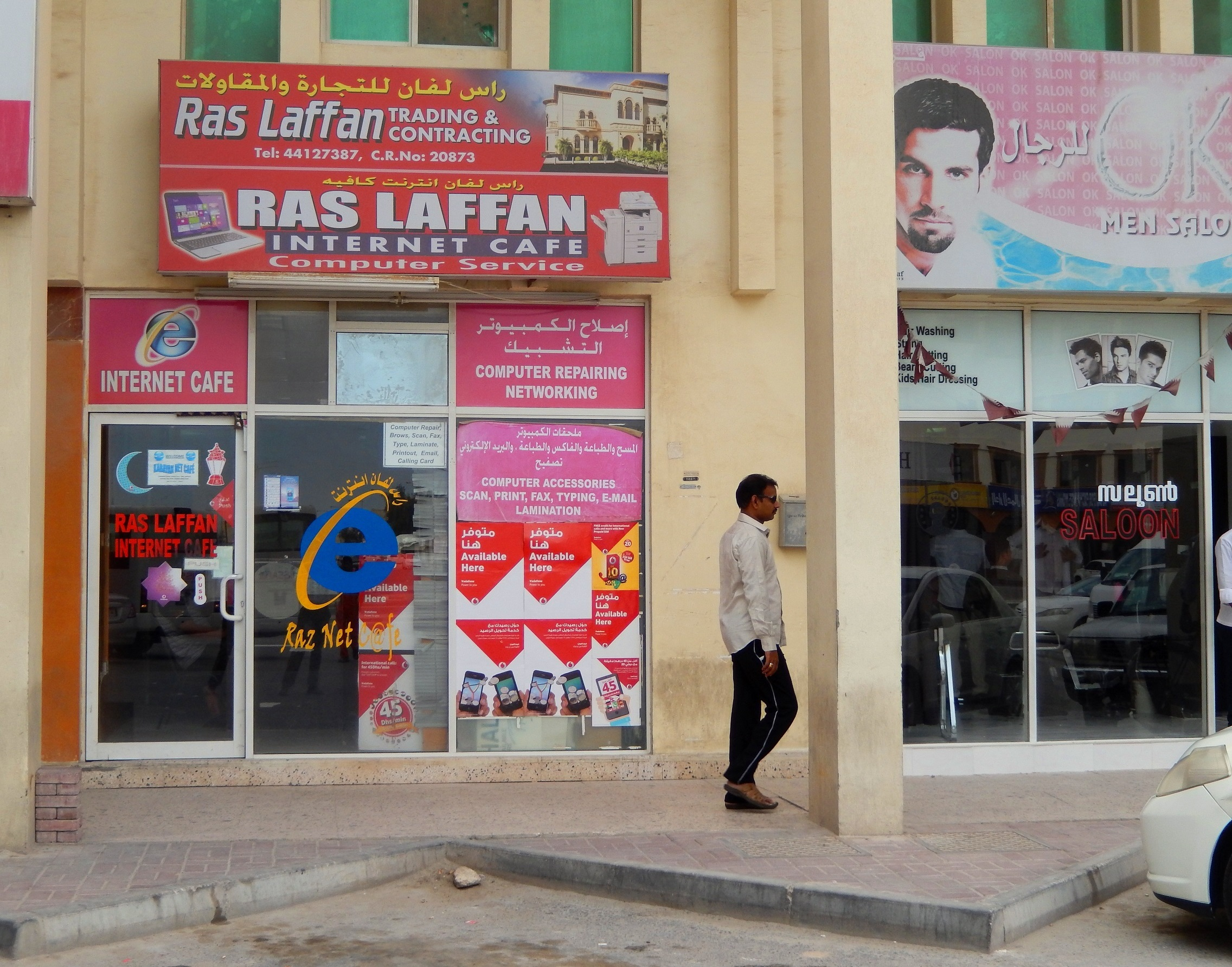
An internet café in Al Khor

In 2007, Qatar was the second most connected country in the Arab region. Qatar's Internet penetration rate grew from 6% in 2001 to 37% in 2007 to 86% in 2011.

Ooredoo is the telecommunications service provider licensed by the Supreme Council of Information and Communication Technology (ictQATAR) to provide both fixed and mobile telecommunications services. Ooredoo offers domain name registration, pre-paid Internet cards, instant Internet access (via a telephone line, allowing payment for the Internet through the phone bill), and ADSL lines. However, as of November 2006, Ooredoo's monopoly on Internet services officially ended. Though the licensing procedure for new ISPs has not yet been published or implemented, the goal was to "issue licenses to new fixed and mobile providers by the end of 2007."

Broadband penetration in Qatar is rapidly increasing. As of April 2008, it stands at 50 percent. Qtel had some 1.25 million mobile users as of December 2007, which indicates a more than 100 percent penetration rate in Qatar. Qtel also has about 50,000 customers connected to its 3.5G mobile network.

Various plans exist to spread Internet access, such as making free wireless Internet available in various parks in Qatar, making wireless coverage available nationwide, and with "Remote Locations services (Wireless Local Loop) that uses Broadband Point-to-Multipoint Radio technology".

Qatar's Global Information Technology Report 2007–2008 concluded that, even though there are many e-education initiatives in Qatar, parental anxiety might prevent children from enrolling in these initiatives. The report claims that in the Qatari society, "the issue of inappropriate content on the Internet is a huge barrier to wholesale adoption of the technology. Some parents resist children's Internet use and a wide technological divide exists between children and their parents."

Qatar was listed in a 2013 report as having the tenth-highest percentage population using the internet. It was the highest ranked MENA country.

A 2015 report by the UN Broadband Commission for Digital Development ranked Qatar as first among the developing countries by their respective percentage population using internet. The country also ranked second globally for percentage of households with internet. Qatar was also ranked seventh globally in Ovum's Broadband Development Index in 2015.

According to a report by Akamai Technologies in August 2017, Qatar ranked first in the Middle East & North Africa (MENA) region in broadband connection speeds, and seventh globally.

== Legal and regulatory framework ==
Qatar's Supreme Council for Communications and Information Technology (ictQatar) is the main regulatory authority in Qatar.

In 2006, a new telecommunications law was promulgated. Much of the telecommunications law is dedicated to competition and dominant service providers. Article 23 states that for the purpose of interconnection any service provider can be designated as the dominant service provider in one or more telecommunications markets "in accordance with the competition policy." Chapter 9 lays out the competition policy; Article 43 describes abuses of dominance. No details are available for the licensing of ISPs, only that the General Secretariat is in charge of licensing. Chapter 15 states that "power of monitoring and enforcement," with the permission of the attorney general and the chairman of the board, "may require service providers or others to provide information necessary for exercising its powers, and the information shall be furnished in the form, manner, and time as the government specifies."

The last chapter of the law covers offenses and penalties—mostly having to do with penalties that violate the previously mentioned articles, privacy, or security. However, there are two subsets in this chapter which have a broader scope: clause 6 of Article 66 states that any person who uses "a telecommunication network" or allows "such use for the purposes of disturbing, irritating or offending any persons" can be fined or imprisoned for up to one year. Also, under clause 7 of Article 66, "using any facility or telecommunications service in a manner that violates the rules of this Law or other laws" is punishable in the same manner. The vague wording of both these articles restricts Internet users, as they can be applied in various cases.

In July 2008, ictQATAR allowed Ooredoo and Vodafone Qatar to provide voice services to the public and made it legal for any person or business to use VoIP services for voice calls for their own use. Businesses within the State of Qatar are prohibited from selling VoIP calls or services to the public without a license issued by ictQATAR.

== Surveillance and filtering ==
There are no reports of specific Internet surveillance in Qatar, but a report by Reporters Without Borders said that Ooredoo "has the means to spy on messages sent through the other ISPs." A U.S. State Department Human Rights report said that the government of Qatar censors the Internet through a proxy server that monitors and blocks Web sites, e-mail, and chat rooms through the state-owned ISP.

Qatar is one of the most connected countries in the Arab region, but Internet use is heavily censored. Internet filtering in Qatar is pervasive in the social and Internet tools areas and selective in political and conflict/security areas according to a report by the OpenNet Initiative in August 2009.

Qatar filters pornography, political criticism of Gulf countries, gay and lesbian content, sexual health resources, dating and escort services, and privacy and circumvention tools. Internet users complain that non-obscene or non-offensive Web sites are also blocked. Political filtering is limited, but journalists practice self-censorship and avoid reporting on sensitive issues. The filtering in Qatar is relatively transparent (a block page is served). Qatar's telecom regulator ictQATAR said it does not advise Ooredoo on blocking Internet sites and that Ooredoo blocks sites in accordance with the guidelines issued by law enforcement authorities.

The government of Qatar has imposed a recent amendment to the penal code which furthermore regulates freedom of speech and expression. Article 136 (bis), by Emir Tamim bin Hamid Al Thani, authorizes the imprisonment of anyone who facilitates the spread of fake news online.
