= Internet in Switzerland =

Internet usage is notably extensive in Switzerland, with 96% of the population aged between 15 and 88 engaging online in 2021. This figure demonstrates a wide adoption across age demographics, highlighted by the fact that over half of those aged 75 and above are daily internet users. The country's advanced broadband infrastructure plays a key role in facilitating this level of usage. By the end of 2022, Switzerland was ranked highest in broadband penetration among the countries of the Organisation for Economic Co-operation and Development (OECD).

In Switzerland, a universal service is offered which guarantees basic telecommunication services including public telephone, broadband internet, and provisions for disabled people. This service is required to be “affordable, reliable, and must be of a certain quality”. For the period from 2024 to 2031, Swisscom has been designated as the holder of the universal service license.

== User statistics ==
- Internet users: 6.8 million, 49th in the world; 85.2% of the population, 19th in the world (2012).
- Fixed broadband: 3.3 million subscribers, 27th in the world; 41.9% of population, 3rd in the world (2012).
- Mobile broadband: 3.3 million subscribers, 49th in the world; 41.4% of population, 39th in the world (2012).
- Internet hosts: 5.3 million, 20th in the world (2012).
- Top level domain: .ch
- IPv4 addresses: 20.9 million, 0.5% of worldwide total, 2.726 addresses per person (2012).

== Internet usage ==
The 2020 study by the University of Zurich, as a part of the World Internet Project, presents data on internet usage in Switzerland. It shows that 97% of Swiss users employ search engines, 92% search for word definitions, and 87% access online encyclopedias. Fact-checking online is conducted by 71% of users, and 100% look for news, ranging from local to international coverage.

In terms of personal use and e-commerce, 83% of users search for travel information, 76% seek health-related content, and 71% book travel arrangements online. Job searching is conducted online by 33% of the population. In the realm of e-commerce, 87% of users research products, 82% make purchases, 76% compare prices, and 36% sell items online. The study also finds that 77% of Swiss internet users utilize online banking services.

== Broadband ==
As reported by the Swiss Federal Communications Commission in November 2023, Switzerland shows a strong broadband infrastructure. By the end of 2022, 48.2% of the Swiss population had broadband internet connections, exceeding the rates in France (46.6%), Norway (45.7%), Korea (45.4%), and well above the OECD average of 34.9%.

The Federal Office of Communications (OFCOM) regularly publishes data on fixed networks, mobile network, and broadband in general and the current market situation. The data includes speeds and prices of providers.

=== Mobile broadband ===
In 2022, the Swiss mobile network market was primarily dominated by three providers: Swisscom, with a 57% share, Sunrise with a 26% share, and Salt with a 16% share. Additionally, other providers collectively made up approximately 1% of the market.

Switzerland has progressively phased out its GSM (2G) network, introduced in 1993, by the end of 2022. The 3G network, covering 99% of the population, is also being retired, with Swisscom operating it until 2025. As of 2022, over 99% of Switzerland is covered by LTE (4G), and rapid 5G network rollout has led to Swisscom achieving 99% population coverage with speeds up to 1 Gbps, and Sunrise covering over 96% with similar speeds. Salt reached 99.9% of the population with speeds up to 750 Mbps by combining 3G, 4G, and 5G signals.

=== Fixed broadband ===
The merger between Sunrise and UPC in 2021 has significantly altered the landscape of Switzerland's broadband market, reducing the traditional distinctions between telecom providers and cable network operators. As of the fourth quarter of 2022, Swisscom was the market leader with a 48% share, followed by Sunrise with 28%. Other cable operators, including Quickline, collectively accounted for approximately 13% of the market. The remaining share is distributed among various other telecom operators (7%) and Salt (4%).

In the context of fiber to the home (FTTH) deployment, Switzerland's standing is mid-range in Europe, with optical fiber contracts forming around 27% of all broadband connections in the country, a figure below the OECD average of 37.7%.

The expansion of fiber optic networks in urban centers across Switzerland saw a notable increase beginning in 2020. This growth was supported by contributions from local fiber optic consortia and national efforts by Swisscom. By June 2023, Swisscom's initiatives had extended ultra-fast internet connections to 2,065 municipalities. The following summary table provides details on the main municipalities affected by this expansion:

Municipalities	Maximum Download Speed availability
Geneva	10 Gbit/s
Fribourg	10 Gbit/s
Bern	10 Gbit/s (from 2025)
Thun	200 Mbit/s
Zug	10 Gbit/s
Lucerne	10 Gbit/s
Zurich	10 Gbit/s
Basel	10 Gbit/s
Lugano	10 Gbit/s
St. Gallen	10 Gbit/s
Lausanne	10 Gbit/s
Winterthur	10 Gbit/s
Sion	10 Gbit/s

== See also ==
- Search.ch
