= Internet in Tajikistan =

Internet in Tajikistan became present within the country during the early 1990s. Tajikistan had just become independent in 1992, with Emomali Rahmon as the new ruler, when the internet was introduced to the country. Nevertheless, it was after over a decade that the country’s internet became more accessible. The history of the internet’s foundation in Tajikistan extends from 1992 to present-day Tajikistan. By 2009, internet penetration had developed since the initial conception of the internet in Tajikistan and Internet Service Providers (ISPs) had increased in number. For most of the applications vpn is necessary inside tajikistan except for government use

Although at the initial start there was little governing of the internet, after the 2000s, new legalities became associated with the internet in Tajikistan. There are certain restrictions as to what is accessible and on display on the internet and as such, surveillance and filtering is present.

== History ==
The Internet in Tajikistan emerged as the country was ending a bloody civil war that followed the demise of Soviet rule in the early 1990s. The resulting fragmentation of power also meant that Internet services developed largely without state interference and the Ministry of Transport and Communications played a weak role in the development of the sector as a whole. Telecommunications remained fragmented up until the end of the 1990s, with several companies failing to interconnect because of fierce (and at times violent and armed) competition. During this period of instability, ISPs were aligned with feuding political and criminal interests that spilled over to the competition among the ISPs themselves.

Since the end of the civil war, the government has taken steps to attract investors and liberalize the sector prompted by expectations of accession to the WTO. However, important steps are still pending, such as the privatization of Tajiktelecom (the national operator) and the establishment of an independent regulatory authority. In recent years, the telecommunications sector has boosted Tajikistan's GDP, and the number of licensed Internet and mobile operators has been increasing. In 2008, more than 180 companies were licensed in the ICT market.

== Internet penetration and ISPs ==
As of January 2020 Tajikistan has 26% internet penetration.

Internet penetration in Tajikistan was estimated at 9.3 percent in 2009. In 2009, the cost of accessing the Internet increased, further restricting development of the sector. Access costs of US$0.73 per hour at Internet cafés and up to $300 for unlimited Wi-Fi traffic compare poorly with average wages of $35 per month and a minimum salary of $7 per month. Unlimited monthly traffic by dial-up access costs $26.41; xDSL with capacity of 128/64 kbit/s amounts to $200; and Wi-Fi unlimited traffic per month with the same capacity is $300.

One respected Tajik NGO estimates that 1 percent of households own personal computers and that most people access the Internet from home by way of dial-up connections. Access with DSL and wireless (Wi-Fi and WiMAX) technologies is limited by relatively high costs, and therefore restricted to a small number of commercial companies.

In 2009, there are ten main ISPs in Tajikistan actively providing Internet services to all major cities in the country. The state-owned telecommunications company Tajiktelecom, which provides local, long-distance, and international telephone, mobile telephony, and Internet services, lost its unrivaled dominance of the telecoms market in 2007, when Babilon-Mobile seized more than 30 percent of the market. Tajikistan remains dependent on satellite-based connections using Discovery Global Networks, as the cost of fiber remains high—approximately 30 percent higher than using the same-capacity channel over VSAT. The country is connected to the Trans-Asia-Europe (TAE) fiber-optic highway passing through Uzbekistan, and a second connection is from Kyrgyzstan. In part to overcome this bottleneck, Tajiktelecom expanded their fiber-optic infrastructure across the country and establish connections with China.

The ISPs are reluctant to share information about their bandwidth because of the concern that the data would be used by their competitors to undermine their market position. They are also reluctant to discuss their international points of connection from which they buy bandwidth. The ONI data reveal that with the exception of TARENA (an educational network), all Tajik ISPs maintained two international points of access, one located in Russia and the other in Western Europe. Tajik providers are aggressive in adopting new technologies. Three of the operators, Babilon-T, Telecom Technology, and Eastera, provide a commercial Next Generation Network (NGN) service.

In 2005, the Association of Tajik ISPs established a national Internet exchange point (IXP) that connected only four of the ten commercial ISPs (Babilon-T, Compuworld, Eastera, and MKF Networks), as well as TARENA. At the time of writing, the IXP is not operational as ISPs prefer to maintain bilateral peering connections between them.

Most Internet users are young and access the Internet through Internet cafés close to schools and universities. In January 2006, the Ministry of Transport and Communications estimated that some 400 Internet cafe´ s, mostly concentrated in large cities, operated in the country. Many Internet cafés act as second-tier ISPs and buy their bandwidth from the first-level ISPs (i.e., main ISPs in the country with independent international connection). Recent changes in licensing regulations require Internet cafés operating as ISPs to obtain a license from the Ministry, a requirement which has brought about a decrease of the overall number of Internet cafés.

Although more than 70 percent of the population resides in rural areas, Internet access is mainly restricted to urban areas because of poor infrastructure and low afford-ability. A 2005 study by the local Civil Initiative on Internet Policy (CIPI) shows a great disparity between the percentage of men accessing Internet (77.5) and that of women (22.5). About 12 percent of users are secondary school students, with around 100 schools across the country connected to the Internet. The most active users are university students, employees of international organizations, commercial companies, and public sector institutions.

Tajik is the official national language. Nevertheless, Russian remains the most popular language for Internet use. According to data obtained from the national information portal (TopTJ.com), the top-ten most-visited Web sites in October 2007 were informational and analytical portals (AsiaPlus, Varorud, Watanweb, Ariana), a commercial bank, and entertainment sites. Other popular Web sites include mail.ru; popular research engines are rambler.ru, google.com, yahoo.com, and yandex.ru. Among Tajik youth, the most popular applications include instant messenger, followed by social networking sites (odnokassniki.ru, my.mail.ru), and online educational resources.

Local Tajik content on the Internet is poorly developed. Most Internet content is available in Russian, but the knowledge of Russian among the younger generation is gradually decreasing. A survey conducted among 342 students and professors from nine universities showed 60 percent of respondents saw the Internet as an informational and educational resource, but not as a means to create local information resources. The Tajik top-level domain name was registered with the Internet Assigned Numbers Authority (IANA) in 1997, but the domain name was later suspended because it was used mainly for registering pornography sites. In 2003, the domain name registration was delegated to the Information and Technical Center of the President of Tajikistan Administration, a state entity that now supervises registrations within the ".tj" domain. Any operator that has a license for providing telecommunication services (including Internet) is eligible to act as a domain registrar. By January 19, 2008, 4,894 second-level domain names were registered within the ".tj" domain.

== Legal and regulatory frameworks ==
All Tajik ISPs operate under a license from the Tajik Ministry of Transport and Communication. Internet service providers are permitted to operate VoIP services under an IP-telephony license, although the ministry has introduced amendments that require VoIP providers to obtain a special license, presumably as a means to further regulate the sector.23 In Tajikistan, P2P services are not popular, and the government has not shown ambitions to regulate them at this time.

The main state entities regulating the Internet in Tajikistan are the Security Council (SC), the ICT Council, and the MTC (an entity established in February 2007, replacing the former Ministry of Communications). The Communications and Informatization Department of the MTC is the main regulator in the telecommunications industry and is empowered to issue licenses for any related activities.24 In 2003, the government adopted the Conception on Information Security, 25 which serves as a platform for proclaiming official views and policy directions to preserve state information security. The president remains the key authority that ratifies the main legal documents in the IT sector and directs ICT policy in the country. The SC controls the implementation of the State Strategy on Information and Communication Technologies for Development of the Republic of Tajikistan (e-Strategy), 26 aimed at developing the information society and exploiting the country's ICT potential. The SC monitors telecommunications, including the Internet, for national security reasons. The ICT Council, 27 where the president sits as chairman alongside members of the government, is responsible for implementing and coordinating work under the e-Strategy and advising the president. However, although the council was established in February 2006, it has yet to be convened.

The government restricts the distribution of state secrets and other privileged data intending to "discredit the dignity and honor of the state and the President," or that which contains "violence and cruelty, racial, national and religious hostility ... pornography ... and any other information prohibited by law."28 The provisions of this regulation are broad and allow state bodies wide discretion in their application. The control over information security is assigned to the Main Department of State Secrets and the Ministry of Security.

The lower chamber (Majlisi Namoyandagon) and the president ratified the Law on Changes and Amendments to the Criminal Code in June and July 2007, respectively. The changes introduced, inter alia, provisions on defamation (Article 135, part 2, Slander) and provisions on illegal collection and distribution of private data (Article 144, part 1). Defamation incurred over "mass media or Internet" is prosecuted according to local laws when it contains "intentional distribution via the Internet of knowingly false, libelous and insulting information, as well as expletive words and phrases which denigrate the dignity of human personality."

== Surveillance and filtering ==
Several government agencies possess the right to inspect ISPs’ activities and premises, and require information on their users. The rights and obligations of ISPs in this regard are envisioned in the Annex to the "Internet Services Provision Rules within the Republic of Tajikistan" (herein referred to as the Rules). According to Section 4, paragraph 15, of the Rules, the provider is obliged to "render its activity in accordance with the current Rules" and "provide an easy access to its facilities for employees of the State Communications Inspectorate of the Ministry of Transport and Communications, Ministry of Security and other state agencies granted under the corresponding rules, provide on their demand information, for which they are authorized to ask and fulfill their instructions on time."

In 2006, the government signaled its intention to create an agency under the auspices of the Ministry of Transport and Communications that would control the ISP sector. All telecoms and ISPs were required to provide direct access to the state inspectorate in a manner similar to Russian surveillance legislation (SORM). In 2009, the high cost of the project as well as lobbying from telecom operators halted its realization.32 ONI Testing Results

Tajikistan does not have an official policy on Internet filtering. However, state authorities have been known to restrict access to some Web sites at politically sensitive times by communicating their "recommendations" to all top-level ISPs—an example of second-generation controls. Prior to the 2006 presidential election, the government-controlled Communications Regulation Agency issued a "Recommendation on filtering" that advised ISPs that, "for the purpose of information security," they should "engage in filtering and block access to Web sites that aim to undermine the state policy in the sphere of information."29 As a result, several oppositional news Web sites hosted in Russia or Tajikistan were inaccessible to Tajik users for several days.30 Although officials offered unclear reasons for shutting down the Web sites, independent media sources believe that the block list will grow in the future.31

In 2007 and 2008, the OpenNet Initiative tested in Tajikistan on four key ISPs: Babilon-T, Eastera, Tajiktelecom, and TARENA. Testing in Tajikistan yielded no evidence of Internet filtering. This extends to pornographic content, and with the exception of TARENA (which services schools and universities), the major ISPs do not filter such content on the backbone level. However, accessing pornographic content at Internet cafés is illegal. Any persons caught accessing such content is subject to a fine ranging from US$15 to $100, and violators may be criminally prosecuted. The ONI's investigation concluded that currently most Internet cafés do not filter access to pornographic content. However, they do employ monitoring software that notifies them when a client is attempting to retrieve such content.
