= Nizar Ben Néji =

Tunisian politician

H.E. Nizar Ben Néji
- نزار بن ناجي
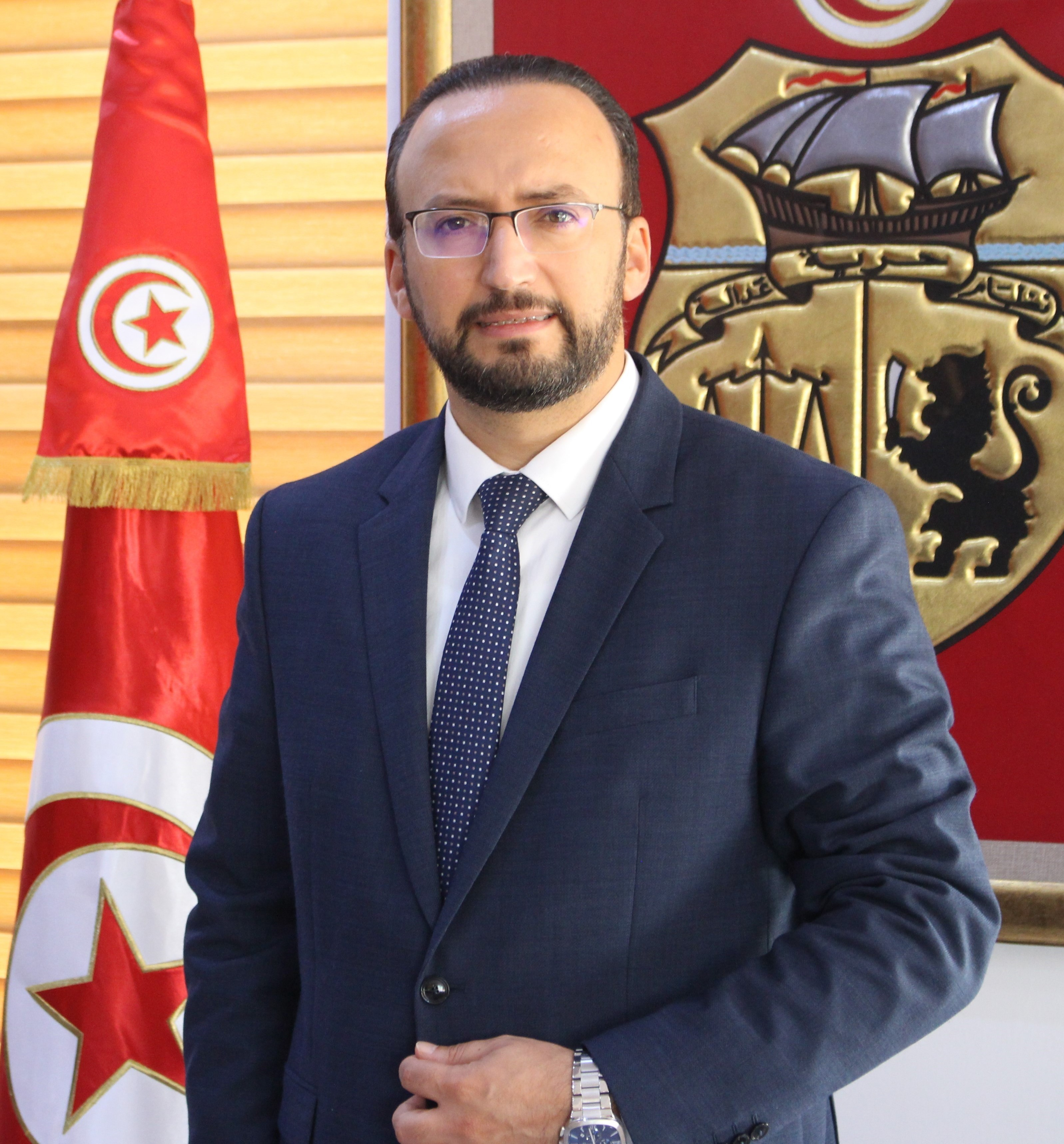
- Ben Neji in 2021

Minister of Communication Technologies
- In office 02 August 2021 – 25 August 2024
- President: Kais Saied
- Preceded by: Mohamed Fadhel Kraiem
- Succeeded by: Sofiene Hemissi

Personal details
- Born: June 27, 1981 (age 44) Tunis, Tunisia
- Party: Independent
- Education: UMass Amherst; Sup'COM; ENSI
- Occupation: ICT Strategist, Computer Engineer, IT Researcher

Nizar Ben Néji (born 27 June 1981) is a Tunisian politician, computer engineer, and former minister of communication technologies, serving at this position from 2021 to 2024. Dr. Nizar Ben Neji was appointed in charge of the ministry of communication technologies of Tunisia on August 2nd 2021 and then confirmed later at this position on October 11th 2021 as a member of the government led by prime minister Najla Bouden then prime minister Ahmed Hachani.

== Biography ==
Nizar Ben Neji holds a Doctorate degree in Information and Communication Technologies from the Higher School of Communications of Tunis (Sup'com) of the University of Carthage and an engineering degree from the National School of Computer Sciences of Tunis (ENSI) of the University of Manouba in 2005. He also performed postdoctoral scientific research at the University of Massachusetts of Amherst in USA as Fulbright scholar, in 2015.

== Career ==
Dr. Ben Neji started his career as a crypto and PKI engineer and later as a project manager at the Tunisian Government Certification Authority (TunTrust) from 2005 to 2013 and was member of several national steering committees and working groups in charge of conducting national IT and E-Government projects in Tunisia. In 2013, he joined the University of Carthage in Tunisia, as lecturer and researcher, first at the Faculty of Sciences of Bizerte (FSB), and later at the Higher School of Communications of Tunis (Sup'com). Dr. Ben Neji was actively involved as Information and communications technology expert at an international level with Commonwealth Telecommunications Organisation (CTO), International Telecommunication Union (ITU) and Arab Information and Communication Technology Organization (AICTO), in delivering seminars and projects in wide variety of subjects related specially to cybersecurity and cybercriminality. Recognised for his strategic vision and practical expertise in the design and the execution of ICT strategic projects in the field of information and communication technologies, Dr. Ben Neji was appointed Minister of Communication Technologies, a position he held for more than three years.

== Strategic achievements and notable milestones ==
During his term of minister of communication technologies, Dr. Ben Neji spearheaded the design and implementation of the Tunisia’s National Digital Transformation Strategy 2025, structured around 8 axes of development and including an action plan with over 80 projects. During his mandate, Dr. Ben Neji focused on modernizing Tunisia’s digital infrastructure and services. Some of the most notable achievements and initiatives under his mandate include, but are not limited to, the following:

1. Tunisian National Digital Transformation Strategy 2025, along with its comprehensive action plan, was elaborated through a collaborative and inclusive process. It was publicly discussed with key ICT ecosystem stakeholders during a dedicated workshop held on May 27, 2022, at Elgazala Technopark. This workshop brought together experts, industry leaders, and government representatives to ensure that the strategy aligned with the national requirements and expected goals. Following these consultations, the strategy was presented and subsequently approved during a ministerial meeting chaired by Prime Minister Najla Bouden on June 21, 2022.
2. A new cybersecurity legislation, enacted on March 11, 2023, came into force on September 11, 2023 and has established the National Agency for Cybersecurity, replacing the old National Agency for Computer Security that had been in place since 2004. This new law provides a more comprehensive and modernized framework, addressing new aspects previously unregulated which are quite important for the national cybersecurity and digital sovereignty in Tunisia. The new key provisions include the protection of critical digital infrastructure, sovereign cloud labelling, and the security’s certification of software and hardware solutions, whether imported or locally produced. The law also introduces national and sectoral Computer Emergency Response Teams (CERTs) and strengthens the security audit framework by adding further restrictions, obligations, and sanctions.
3. A new cybercrime law enacted on 13 September 2022, aimed at combating offences and defining penalties for the crimes in relation with information and communication technologies (ICT). The law outlines the responsibilities of all relevant stakeholders involved in the digital forensics and the management of electronic evidence.
4. Tunisia becomes the 70th party to Budapest Convention on Cybercrime on March 8, 2024 which is the first international treaty seeking to address Internet and computer cross border crimes, harmonizing national laws, improving the digital investigative techniques, and increasing cooperation among nations.
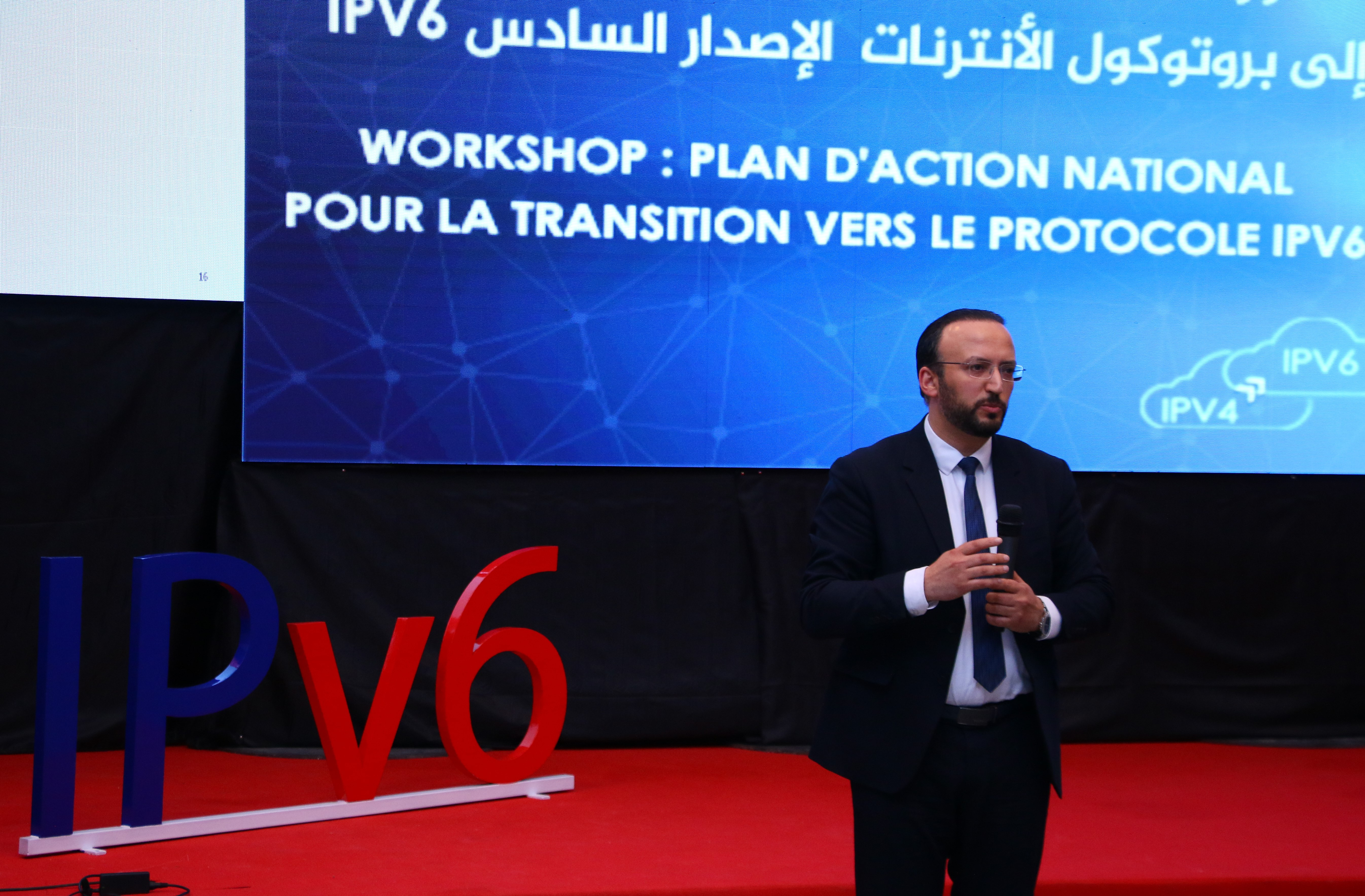
  Tunisia IPv6 Action Plan unveiled during a public workshop on Friday, February 4, 2022
5. The national IPv6 Task Force was established in November 2021, by ministerial decision, with the mandate to develop a comprehensive action plan to accelerate the IPv6 adoption in Tunisia (https://www.ipv6.tn). The national Internet Protocol version 6 policy was defined in a government circular and published on Tuesday, April 19, 2022. Tunisia officially launched IPv6 on September 20, 2023, initially over the mobile network with the three local telecom operators: Tunisie Telecom, Ooredoo Tunisie and, Orange Tunisie and later over the fixed network with the foremost Internet service provider, Topnet. Within just one year, the country's IPv6 adoption rate skyrocketed from 0% to 20%, positioning Tunisia as the third-leading country in Africa for IPv6 adoption and the country that has done the most significant jump worldwide.
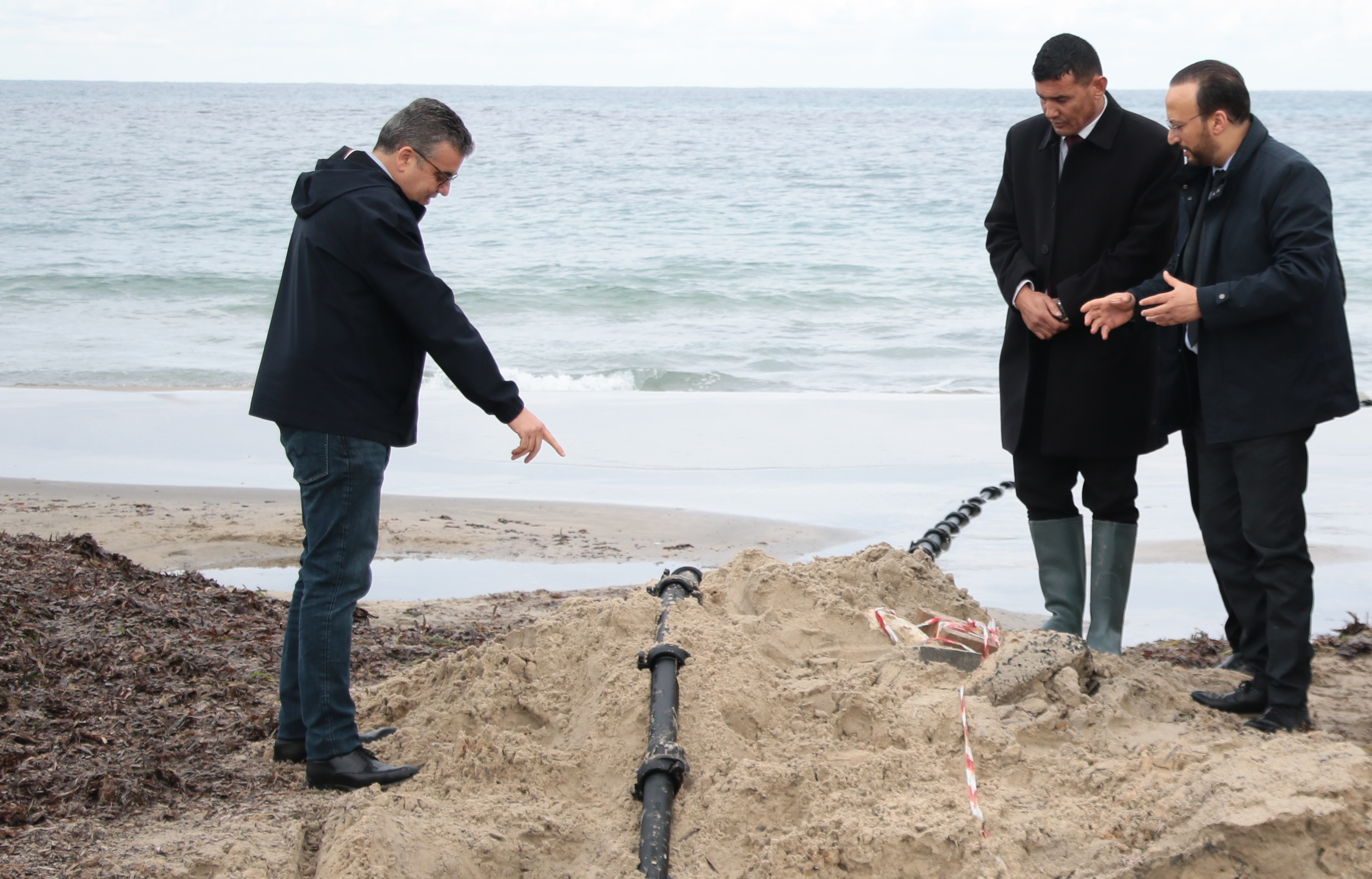
  Landing of the Ifriqya submarine cable at the Ain Meriem area of Bizerte, Tunisia
6. With the aim to enhance the country’s international Internet connectivity, the local telecom operators were authorized to invest and supported by the Ministry of Communication Technologies to quickly install new submarine communication cables and they were also required to upgrade the capacity and to renew the existing cables lines. The Ifriqiya cable, Tunisia's segment of the PEACE system connecting Asia, Africa, and Europe, became operational on March 3, 2024, providing to Tunisia an additional high data rate of approximately 3TB/s. The installation of the new Medusa cable began on May 11, 2023, and the new cable line shared between Tunisie Telecom and Orange Tunisia is expected to be operational by the end of 2024, adding another route line for Tunisia. With a total of six submarine communication cables, Tunisia will secure the necessary diversity, security, and capacity for its connectivity in the years ahead.
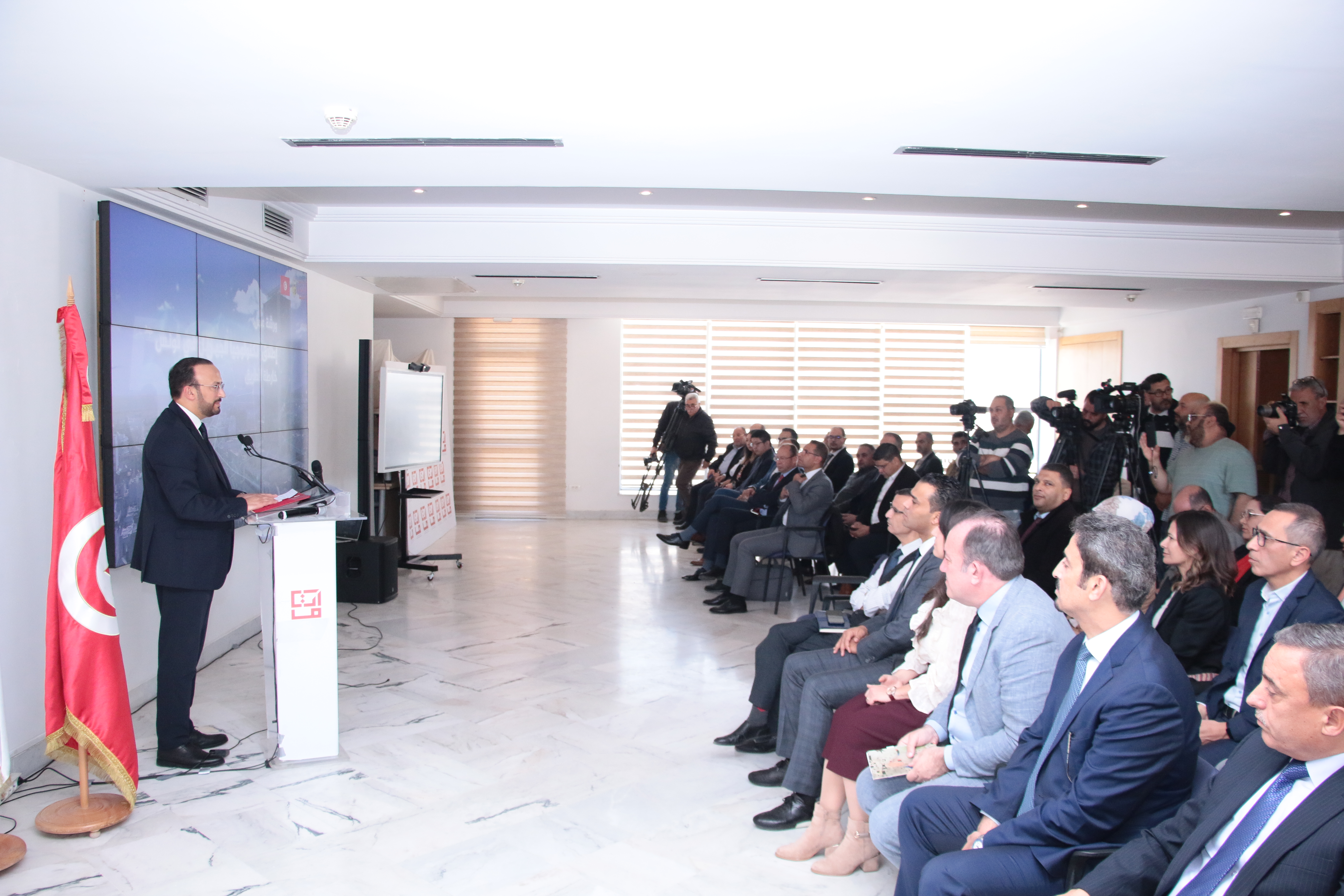
  The 5G Roadmap Announcement by the Minister of Communication Technologies, Nizar Ben Neji
7. The preparation for the rollout of the 5G technology in Tunisia began in October 2021 with two public consultations conducted respectively by the national telecommunications authority (INT) on 5G use cases and by the national agency of frequencies (ANF) on the eventual radio spectrum allocation strategy for 5G. Then, the spectrum refarming phase was crucial to make the frequency bands 2.6 GHz and 700 MHz available as soon as possible for the 5G deployment in Tunisia. The Ministry of Communication Technologies issued special authorizations for pilot experiments of 5G. Subsequently, the three telecom operators conducted tests and trials to master the new technology and prepare for the transition to the next generation. The feasibility study was updated by a specialized consulting firm and the final feasibility report was submitted to the Ministry of Communication Technologies in March 2024. This report outlined technical options, potential use cases, coverage, and security obligations, as well as an estimated cost range for the 5G commercial license. Smaller and more focused consultations were conducted between the sectorial committee led by the Minister Nizar Ben Neji, telecom operators, and manufacturers to discuss the findings of the feasibility study and the results of the pilot phase. The roadmap for the remaining steps, along with the final decisions regarding 5G deployment, was announced in March 2024. The tendering process and the establishment of a national committee responsible for preparing the granting of 5G service licenses were approved during a cabinet meeting chaired by Prime Minister Ahmed Hachani. The tender for 5G operating licenses was launched in June 2024, with commercial deployment in Tunisia expected to begin in January 2025.
8. The project of hardening the process of selling SIM and eSIM cards was initiated by the Ministry of Communication Technologies in collaboration with the National Telecommunications Authority to further protect Tunisia's 16 million mobile phone subscribers. Several measures have been implemented, including deactivating unidentified SIM cards or those with incomplete identification, prohibiting the anarchic sale of SIM cards in the streets starting from January 2025, limiting the number of SIM cards owned per citizen, and assisting citizens in detecting any misuse of their identities with SIM cards through the new, enhanced version of the *186# service and the automatic SMS warning system.
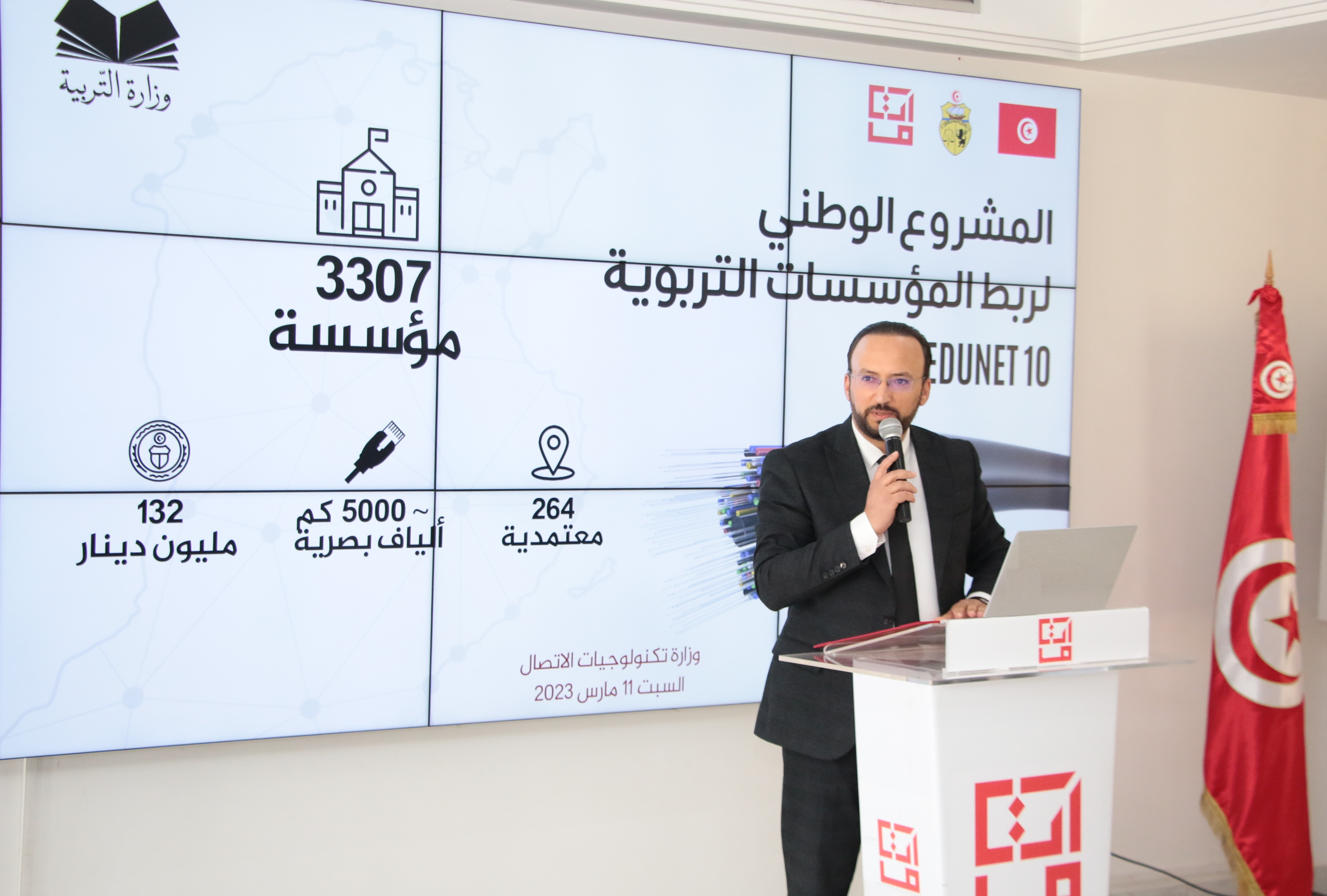
  Kickoff of the Edunet 10 Project by the Minister of Communication Technologies, Nizar Ben Neji
9. The Edunet 10 project was officially launched on March 11, 2023. Co-funded by the African Development Bank and the International Bank for Reconstruction and Development, the project has a total cost of over 132 million Tunisian dinars. Its primary objective is to connect 3,307 schools to a fiber optic network, providing high-speed Internet access to more than 1.5 million students. This initiative also seeks to generalize the connection of educational institutions to the network and provide high-value digital educational services and content. In a next phase, the Ministry of Communication Technologies plans to expand the established fiber communication network to reach the other public entities around schools.
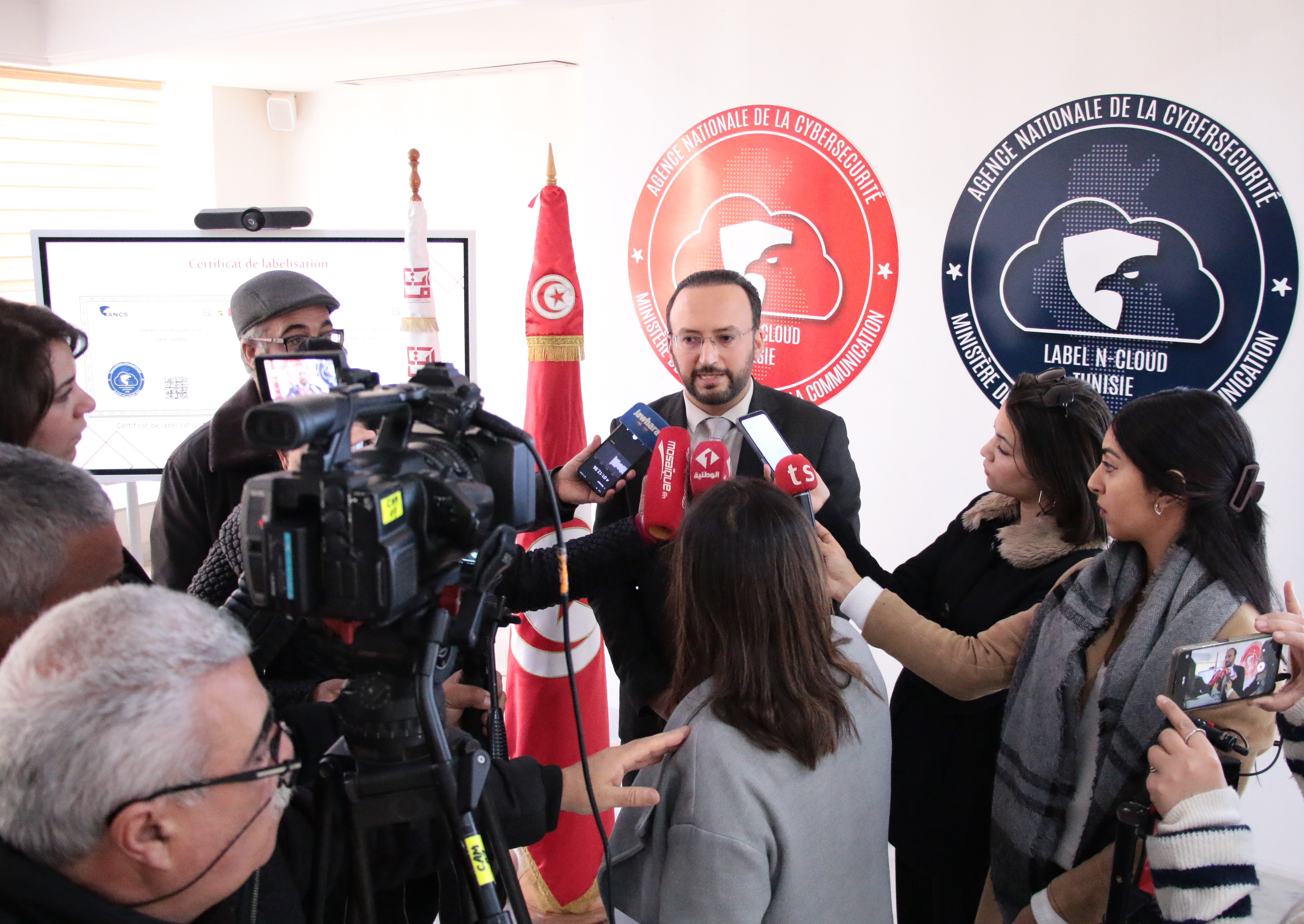
  Press Conference of the TN Cloud Policy by the Minister of Communication Technologies, Nizar Ben Neji
10. A Cloud legal framework was established for the first time in Tunisia in March 2023, accompanied by a government circular defining the "TN Government Cloud First" policy, which was published on July 22, 2024. This policy requires public entities to prioritize Cloud computing services either private, public or community Cloud for hosting digital infrastructure and services. In addition, a new labelling framework to distinguish the sovereign Cloud providers (G-Cloud and N-Cloud) was defined in the order of the Minister of communication technologies of 4 April 2024 and in total, 8 Tunisian Cloud service providers obtained the sovereign label. Consequently, public authorities in Tunisia are facing the end of cooperation with non-certified Cloud service providers when outsourcing the hosting of their infrastructure and electronic services.
11. The Electronic Government (e-Government) policy was published by the Ministry of Communication Technologies in a government circular, on January 19, 2024. This policy mandates that all government authorities adhere to common guidelines, as Tunisia currently has approximately 3,200 administrative procedures, with 75% classified as government-to-business (G2B) services and only 25% as government-to-citizen (G2C) services, many of which are not yet available online. The e-Government policy is composed of 12 rules designed to accelerate digitalization by adopting common building blocks and modernizing how the state serves citizens and businesses through online administrative procedures.
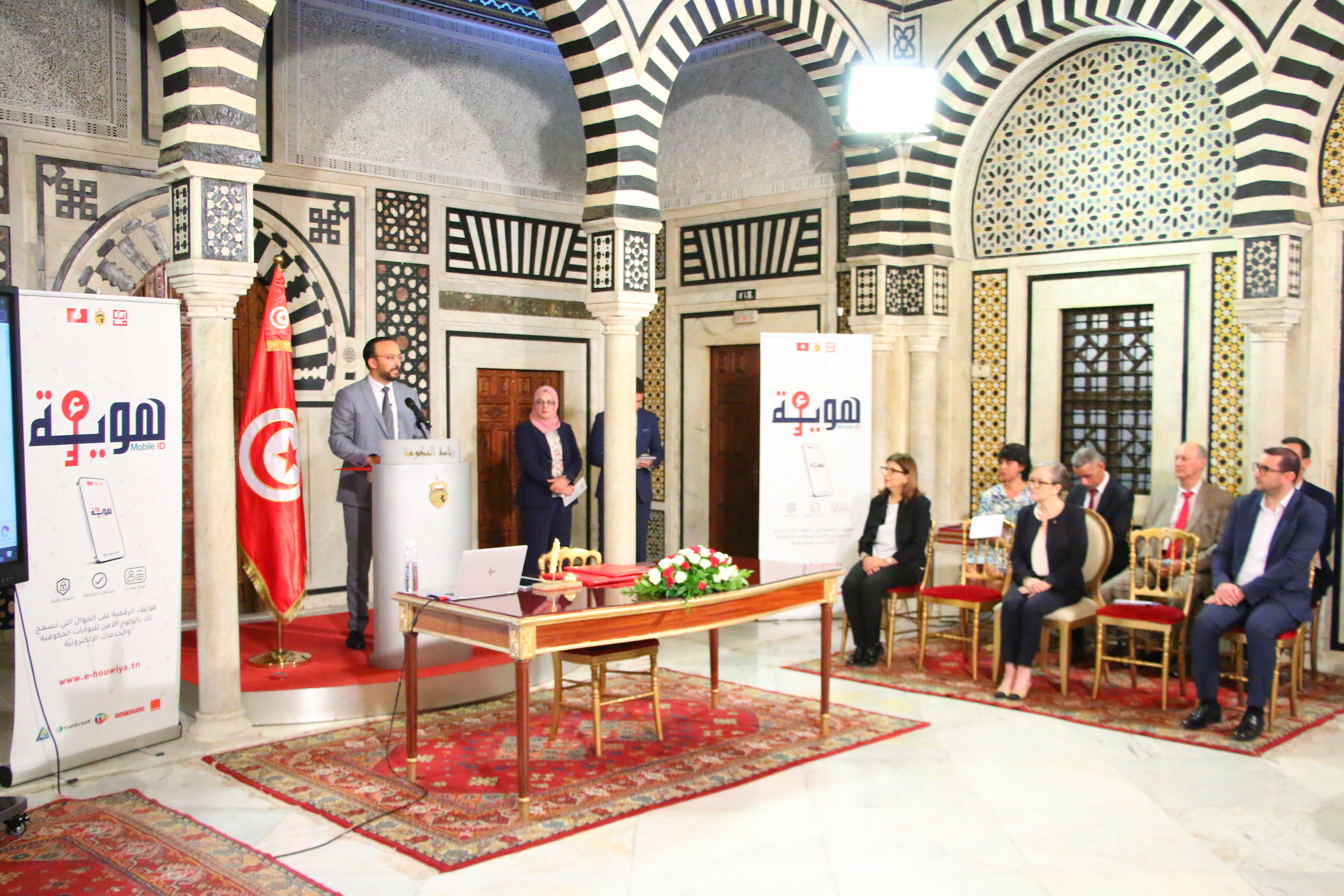
  Launch of E-Houwiya Service at the Presidency of the Government Palace on August 3, 2022
12. The national digital identity system, known as E-Houwiya (https://www.e-houwiya.tn), was launched at presidency of the government palace, on August 3, 2022 under the sponsorship of prime minister Najla Bouden. This system is a key enabler for e-Government, essential for fulfilling KYC requirements to remotely authenticate citizens. It also supports Single Sign-On (SSO) access, replacing multiple credentials (usernames and passwords) with a single multi-factor authentication (MFA) solution. Furthermore, the digital signature created with the national digital ID is recognized as a fully qualified mobile signature, legally valid and equivalent to a handwritten signature. Overall, the digital ID brings multiple functions together and is provided free of charge, similar to initiatives in many countries around the world, to advance the development of e-Government in Tunisia. A widespread campaign to encourage mobile identity adoption was conducted across several governorates and public institutions. As of August 2024, the total number of mobile-id subscribers in Tunisia reached 120,000 citizens, including over 10,000 of Tunisians living abroad.
13. A secure nationwide interoperability system was launched with the deployment of the Unified Exchange Platform (UXP), on February 7, 2023. This new platform enables instant and secure data transfer between public entities, streamlining administrative procedures by minimizing required documents. The pilot phase involves four ministries: Interior, Education, Social Affairs, and Transport. The new platform helps in reducing the documents required by the administrative procedures and it includes features for digital signatures and encryption, ensuring the privacy and security of citizens’ data. The number of the interoperability exchange services has increased from 25 services in 2022 to 75 in 2023 and the overall number of exchanges is expected to reach 150 by the end of 2024.
14. A 10-digit Civil Status Number was introduced for the first time into the national civil registration to enable the online issuance of birth certificates, enhance the reliability of data exchange within the national interoperability system, and facilitate the design of efficient online registration processes for citizens. This means that citizens no longer need to input extensive data sets (such as first name, last name, date of birth, etc.); instead, the newly defined Civil Status Number is sufficient for electronic registration in e-government services.
15. An e-Government citizen portal, E-Bawaba (https://e-bawaba.tn), was established on August 3, 2022, to provide progressively access to public services in a single, unified platform. This new one-stop portal offers a range of digital services, including obtaining civil status documents, signing electronic documents with a qualified digital signature, accessing official mailboxes, receiving official notifications, registering smartphones, and managing mobile payment wallets. Since its launch, E-Bawaba has facilitated access to over 120,000 administrative documents, the creation of more than 80,000 personal mailbox (@tunisia.tn), the creation of more than 15,000 e-wallets and enabled the registration of more than 60,000 smartphones in the national registry of Sajalni.
16. An online dual-signed contract between two citizens, automatically recognized by the administration and marking a first in Tunisia, was introduced on April 11, 2023. This new electronic service, enabling the transfer of private vehicle ownership, was unveiled at the Government Palace under the sponsorship of Prime Minister Najla Bouden. The electronic contract is protected by a PAdES signature (PDF Advanced Electronic Signature) and certified with a TN 2D-Doc visual digital proof. The new service, accessible via the e-bawaba.tn portal, requires users to possess a valid digital identity. The new service was targeting about 250,000 transfers of ownership of vehicles per year in Tunisia. Citizens benefit from real-time access to the status of the vehicle being acquired, eliminating the need for a trip to the municipality to obtain legalized handwritten signatures. Additionally, the paperless transaction ensures that the digital contract is automatically forwarded to the Land Transport Technical Agency, further streamlining the process.
17. An official mailing box for citizens, known as E-Barid (https://www.e-barid.tn), was designed to digitally send official requests and receive documents and notifications from public authorities. The E-Barid service is a bidirectional messaging channel between only the citizen’s domain @tunisia.tn and the official domain of the public authorities (@tunisia.tn, @diplomatie.tn @social.gov.tn, …) and it is totally closed for spam and mundane correspondence.
18. The E-Wallet payment service, linked to the national digital identity system (E-Houwiya), was introduced to promote financial inclusion in Tunisia. Officially launched on April 15, 2023, this new service enables users to create electronic wallets remotely without the need to visit post offices and to make secure online payments and withdrawals. With the E-Wallet service, individuals can easily conduct wire transfers, deposit funds using scratch cards, and manage their accounts through the D17 mobile application or via the USSD service *1717#. Once the e-wallet is created, owners can also request a personalized credit card to be delivered by post mail.
19. Two E-Participation platforms [e-istichara.edu.tn] and [e-istichara.tn] were set in place to actively engage Tunisian citizens in policy designing and in decision-making processes through ICT means. These platforms aim to promote participatory, inclusive, and deliberative governance. Several advanced content analysis techniques were adopted to process results and analyse raw data to generate insightful graphics for comprehensive reports.
20. The E-Iblagh platform (https://e-iblagh.tn) was launched on March 30, 2022, to enable citizens to report issues related to Tunisia’s cyberspace, national digital infrastructure, and electronic services. It fosters civic engagement by allowing users to actively participate in monitoring the quality and reliability of digital services. By providing a streamlined process for submitting reports, the platform ensures that problems are swiftly identified, routed to the appropriate authorities, and resolved efficiently. This contributes to the continuous improvement of Tunisia's digital ecosystem and enhances the responsiveness of public services.
21. Generalization of the TN 2D-Doc proof on official documents has eliminated the need for citizens to obtain certified copies at municipal offices. The 2D-Doc contains encoded and digitally signed data, which can be quickly scanned or read by appropriate devices or software, ensuring the authenticity and integrity of the printed information. This solution helps combat fraud and allows public authorities to issue official documents online. The number of services incorporating the TN 2D-Doc has increased from 79 in 2022 to 112 in 2023, and it is projected to reach 150 by the end of 2024.
22. The Decree-Law No. 2021-1 mandated the use of a vaccine pass to access public spaces, which came into force on December 22, 2021, for a period of six months. The vaccine pass was issued online to millions of Tunisians through the electronic vaccination platform Evax. The Ministry of Communication Technologies was responsible for designing and providing a secure vaccine pass in line with World Health Organization (WHO) recommendations and recognized internationally to facilitate travel to maximum countries.
23. Placing the Higher School of Digital Economy (ESEN) under the supervision of the Ministry of Communication Technologies by Decree No. 2024-215 of April 26, 2024, similar to SupCom and IsetCom.
24. The Digital Excellence Award was established by Decree No. 2023-34 of January 25, 2023, to recognize individuals and companies that have made outstanding and exceptional achievements in the digital industry. The award aims to promote digital innovation through the use of cutting-edge technologies, encourage value creation across all economic sectors, and set new standards of excellence in the ICT sector in Tunisia. This prize is awarded biennially on May 17, in celebration of World Telecommunication and Information Society Day.

During his tenure as Minister of Communication Technologies, Dr. Nizar Ben Neji initiated several projects that are currently in progress, such as the ERP for Tunisian Post, e-VISA service, e-Consulate portal, Administrative portal for consulates, Digital Learning Academy, National unified information system for public libraries, the national project for security auditing of governmental datacentres, the second phase of the white zone project and too many others.

== International Cooperation ==
=== Bilateral Cooperation ===
During his mandate, Dr. Nizar Ben Neji has signed several Memorandums of Understanding (MoUs) with his counterparts from various countries to strengthen bilateral cooperation in digital transformation and IT entrepreneurship:

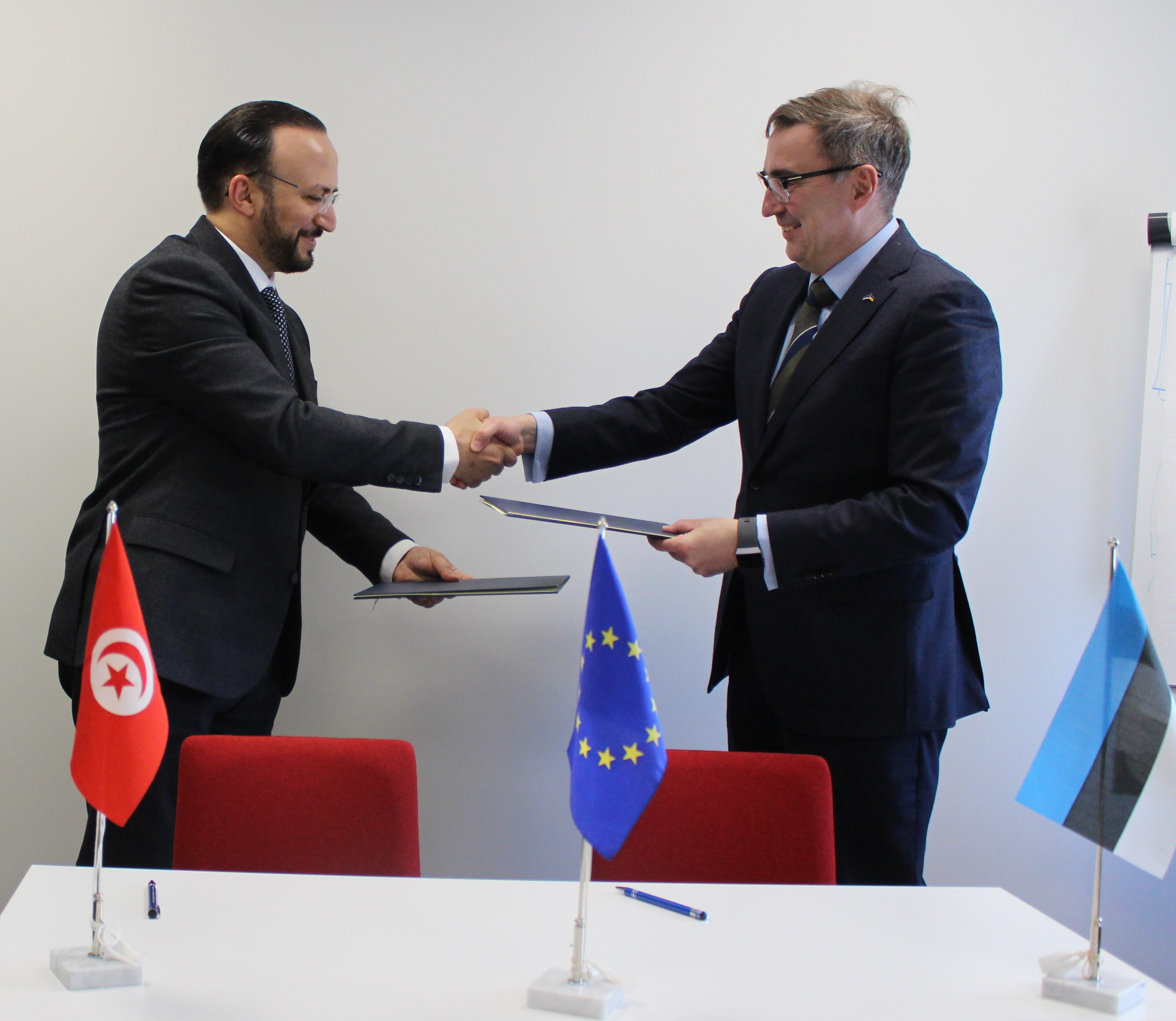
Signature of a MoU with the Minister of Entrepreneurship and Information Technology of Estonia, Andres Sutt on May 18, 2022

1. MoU with the Ministry of Communications and Information Technology of Egypt on May 13, 2022 (Minister Amr Talaat).
2. MoU with the Minister of Entrepreneurship and Information Technology of Estonia on May 18, 2022 (Minister Andres Sutt).
3. MoU with the Ministry of Research, Innovation and Digitization of Romania, on October 3, 2022 (Minister Sebastian Burduja).
4. MoU with the Ministry of Knowledge Economy and Startups of Algeria on December 6, 2022 (Minister Yacine El-Mahdi Oualid).
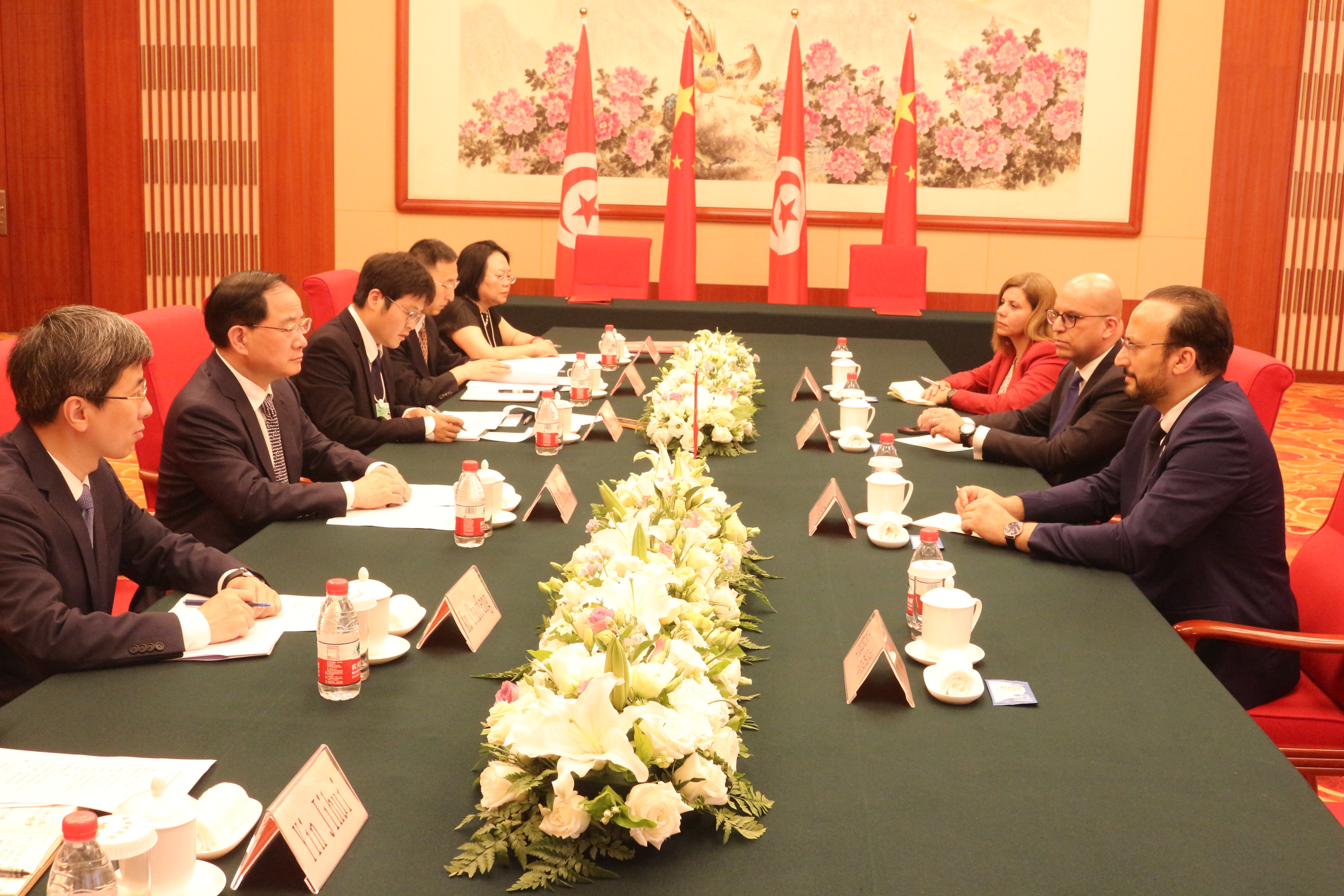
  Bilateral meeting with the Minister of Industry and Information Technology of China, Jin Zhuanglong on June 27, 2023
5. MoU with the Ministry of Industry and Information Technology of China on June 27, 2023, (Minister Jin Zhuanglong).
6. MoC with the Ministry for Digital Transformation of Japan on October 10, 2023 (Minister Taro Kono).
7. MoU with the Ministry of Foreign Affairs and Trade of Hungary on April 29, 2024 (Minister Péter Szijjártó).
8. MoU with the Ministry of Enterprises and Made in Italy of Italy on June 3, 2024 (Minister Adolfo Urso).
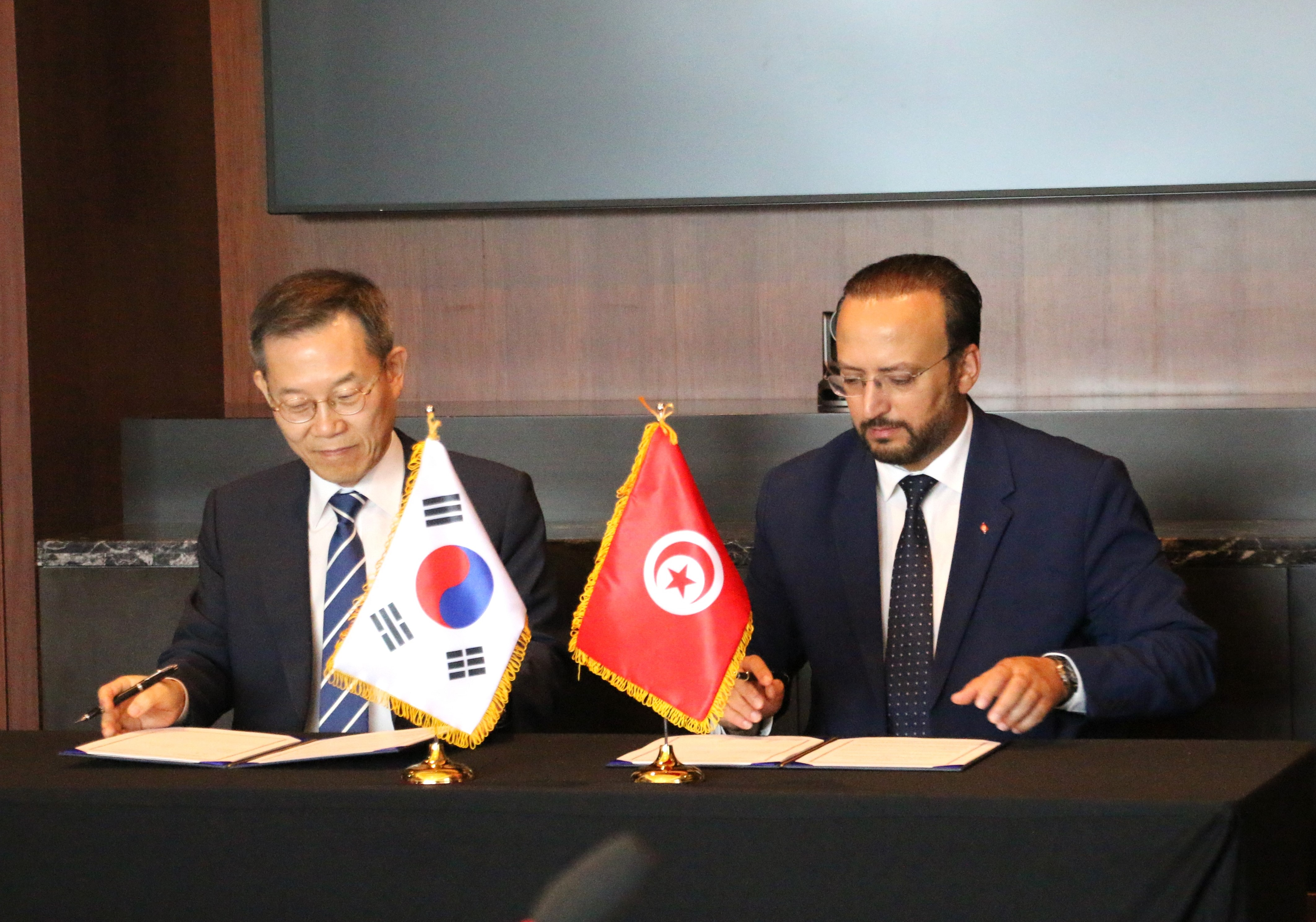
  Signature of a MoU with the Korean Minister of Science and ICT of Korea,Lee Jong-ho on June 5, 2024
9. MoU with the Ministry of Science and ICT of Korea on June 5, 2024 (Minister Lee Jong-ho).

=== Multilateral Cooperation ===
Multilateral cooperation is an integral part of Tunisia's development policy. Participation in multilateral development cooperation in the ICT field offers Tunisia important channel of influence when it comes to promoting Tunisia as a field of ICT innovation and entrepreneurship. During his mandate, Dr. Nizar Ben Neji represented Tunisia and has led several institutional delegations in the most important ICT events for leaders of the International Telecommunication Union (ITU), Arab League, Smart Africa Alliance, Internet Governance Forum (IGF).

1. The 27th session of the Arab Telecommunications and Information Council of Ministers on January 18, 2024 in Abu Dhabi, UAE.
2. The 18th annual meeting of the Internet Governance Forum (IGF) from 8 to 12 October 2023 in Kyoto, Japan.
3. The 14th Annual Meeting of the New Champions 2023 (Davos Economic Forum China 2023) from 27 to 29 June 2023 in Tianjin, China.
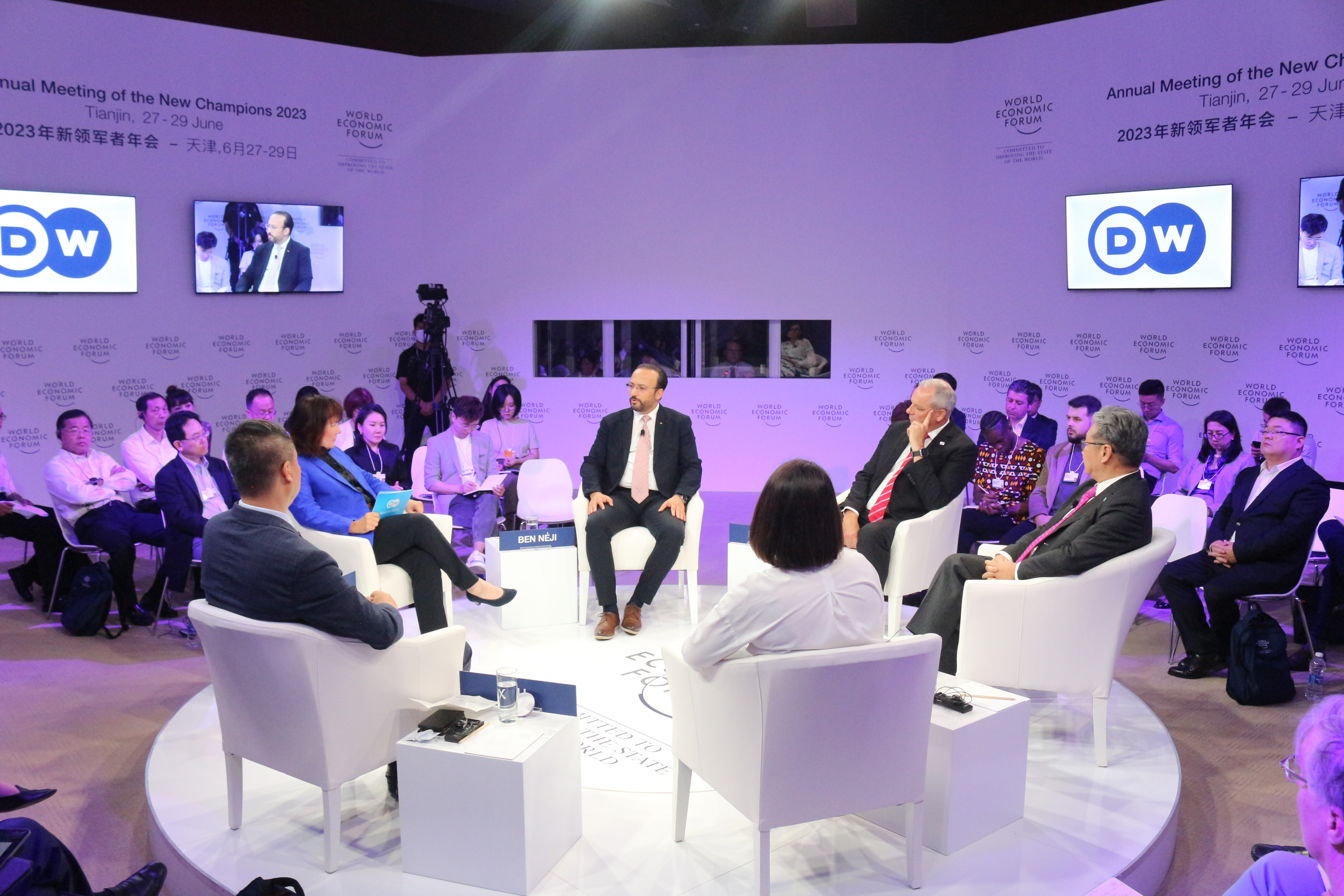
  Dr. Nizar Ben Neji presenting the Tunisia's Digital Strategy 2025 at Davos China 2023
4. The 6th edition of Transform Africa Summit of Smart Africa from 26 to 28 April 2023 in Victoria Falls, Zimbabwe.
5. The ITU WSIS Forum 2023 from 13 to 17 March 2023 in Geneva, Switzerland.
6. The World Government Summit 2023 from 13 to 15 February 2023 in Abu Dhabi, UAE.
7. The 26th session of the Arab Telecommunications and Information Council of Ministers on January 23, 2023 in Cairo, Egypt.
8. The 1st meeting of the African Ministers in charge of startups at the African Startup Conference 2022 on December 5, 2022 in Algiers, Algeria.
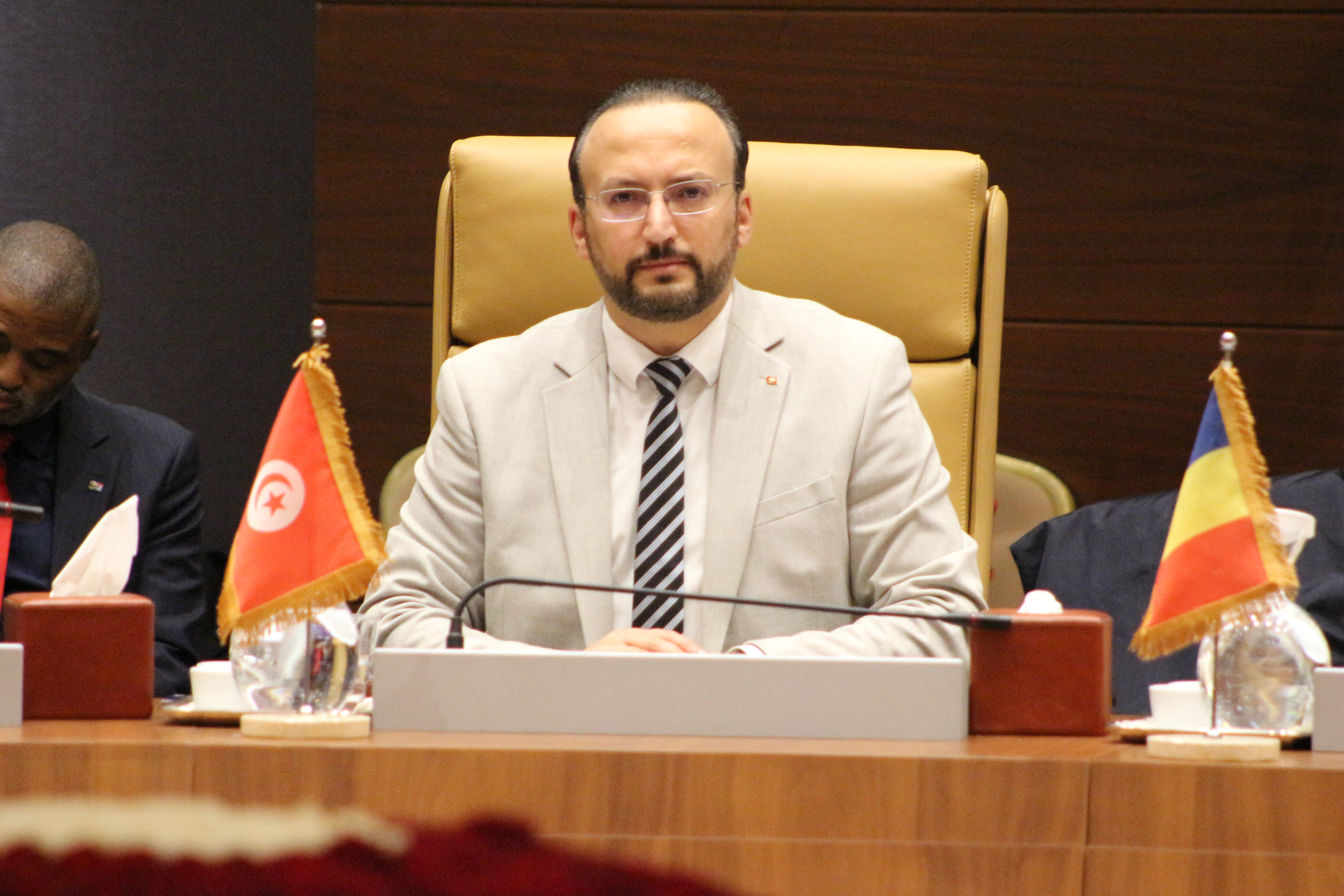
  Dr. Nizar Ben Neji at the 1st meeting of the African Ministers in charge of Startups at ASC 2022
9. The 2nd edition of the AICTO’s Arab High-Level Forum on 29, 30 November and 01 December 2022 in Tunis, Tunisia.
10. The Economic Forum of La Francophonie from 20 to 21 November 2022 in Djerba, Tunisia.
11. The ITU Plenipotentiary Conference from 26 to 30 November 2022, in Bucharest, Romania.
12. The Arab Cybersecurity Forum, October 21-22, 2021 in Tunis, Tunisia.

== Promotion of the Startup Ecosystem ==
Dr. Nizar Ben Neji, Minister of Communication Technologies, has led several official delegations of labelled startups to global tech events renowned for bringing together a confluence of the world’s foremost policymakers, big tech companies, investors, and startup entrepreneurs. During the mandate of Dr. Ben Neji, the Ministry of Communication Technologies dedicated pavilions to provide Tunisian young entrepreneurs with the opportunity to showcase their businesses and technological products.

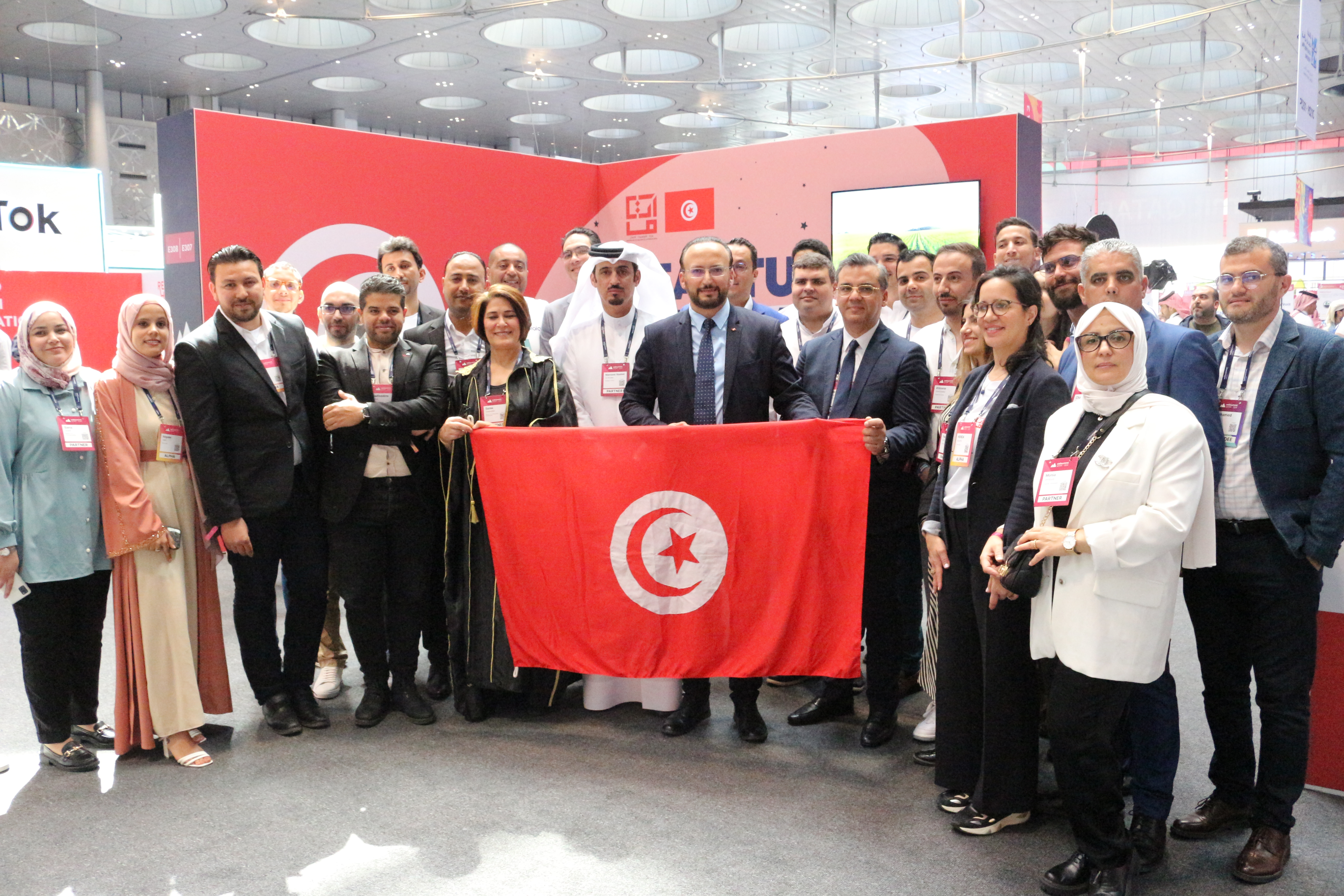
Tunisian Delegation of Startups led by Minister Nizar Ben Neji in Web Summit Qatar 2024

1. Pollutec 2021, in Lyon, France (October 12-15, 2021) – Delegation led by the minister.
2. Expo 2020, in Dubai, UAE (December 7-9, 2021) – Delegation led by the minister.
3. SITIC Africa 2022, in Abidjan, Ivory Coast (May 30 - June 1, 2022) – Delegation led by the minister.
4. Viva Technology 2022, in Paris, France (June 15-18, 2022) – Delegation led by senior ministry officials.
5. Gitex Africa 2023, in Marrakech, Morocco (May 31 - June 2, 2023) – Delegation led by senior ministry officials.
6. Viva Technology 2023, in Paris, France (June 14-17, 2023) – Delegation led by senior ministry officials.
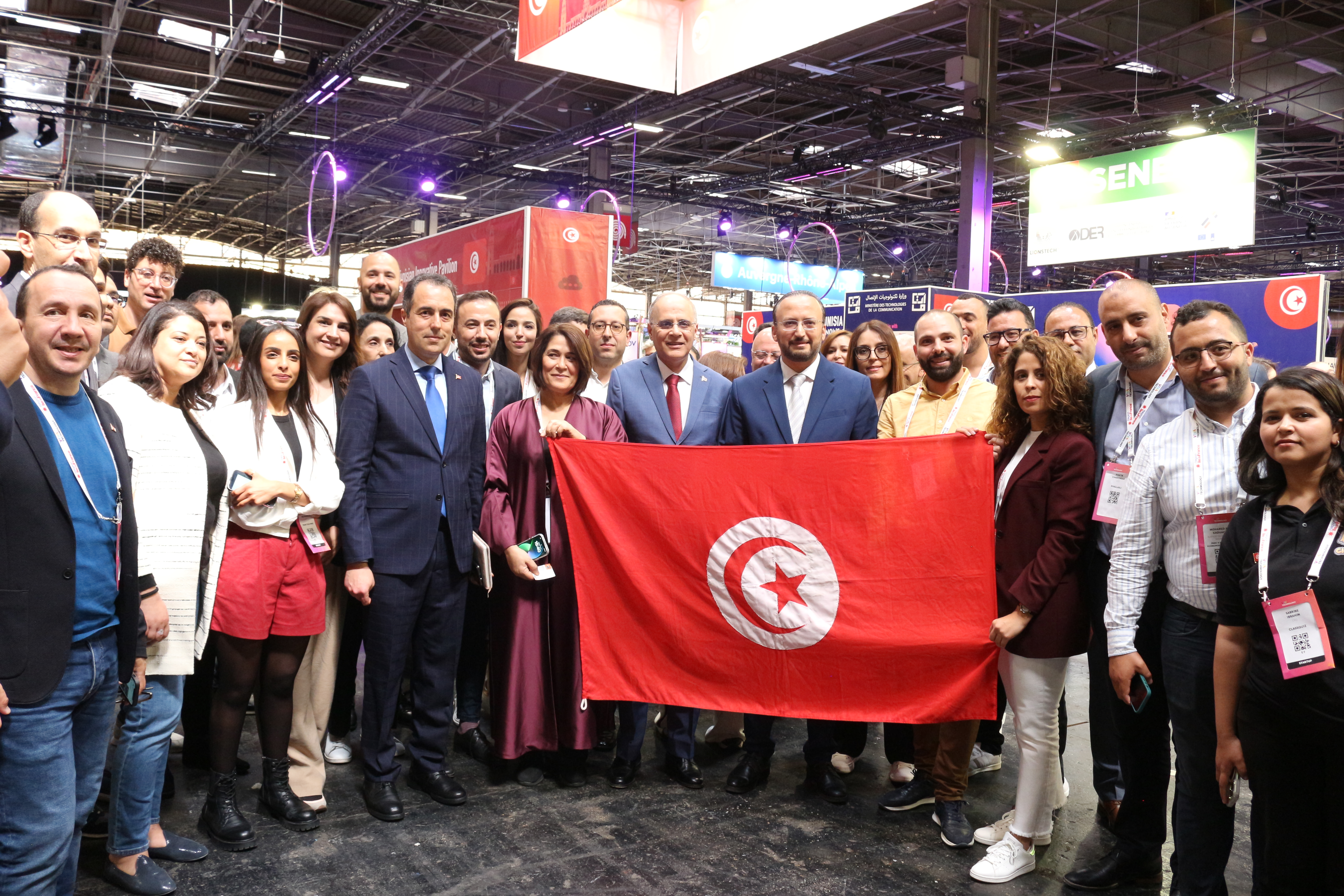
  Tunisian Delegation of Startups led by Minister Nizar Ben Neji in Viva Technology Paris 2024
7. Web Summit 2023, in Lisbon, Portugal (November 13-16, 2023) – Delegation led by senior ministry officials.
8. African Startup Conference 2023, in Algiers, Algeria (December 5-7, 2023) – Delegation led by the minister.
9. Web Summit Qatar 2024, in Doha, Qatar (February 26-29, 2024) – Delegation led by the minister.
10. Viva Technology 2024, in Paris, France (May 22-25, 2024) – Delegation led by the minister.
