= Telecommunications in Tunisia =

Telecommunications in Tunisia includes telephones (fixed and mobile), radio, television, and the Internet. The Ministry of Communication Technologies, a cabinet-level governmental agency, is in charge of organizing the sector.

== Telephones ==
- International calling code: 216 (for calls from outside of Tunisia)
- International call prefix: 00 (for international calls from within Tunisia)
- Fixed lines: 1.2 million (2011), 1.3 million (2009), 1.2 million (2005); 654,000 (1997)
- Mobile cellular: 12.4 million (2011), 9.8 million (2009), 7.2 million (2007); 1.9 million (2003); 50,000 (1998)
- Teledensity: ~100 telephones per 100 persons (fixed-line and mobile-cellular combined)
- System: Above the African average and continuing to be upgraded; key centers are Sfax, Sousse, Bizerte, and Tunis; telephone network is completely digitized
  - domestic: trunk facilities consist of open-wire lines, coaxial cable, and microwave radio relay
  - international: 5 submarine cables; 2 satellite earth stations - Intelsat (Atlantic Ocean) and Arabsat; coaxial cable and microwave radio relay to Algeria and Libya; participant in Medarabtel; 2 international gateway digital switches

== Radio and television ==
First radio service began in 1935 in Tunisia.

- Radio stations: Several state-owned and private radio networks (2012)
- Radios: 2.06 million (1997)
- Television stations: State-owned and private national TV channels; Egyptian, French, and pan-Arab satellite TV command large audiences (2012)
- Televisions: 920,000 (1997)
- Households with television: 91.7% (2003)

The government of former President Ben Ali tightly controlled the press and broadcasting. But since the 2011 popular revolt, many journalists have enjoyed new-found freedoms. The number of radio and TV channels and print publications has increased, as has their freedom to report and debate political and social issues. State TV, which had toed the government line, has changed tack, giving airtime to the former opposition.

Prior to the Tunisian revolution there were four private radio stations operating in Tunisia. In June 2011, following the Tunisian revolution, a recommendation to license twelve new private radio stations was forwarded to the interim Prime Minister. In August 2011 none of the recommendations had been acted upon. However, several stations began broadcasting under time-limited provisional licenses. The stations operate without specific operating rules because a new regulatory framework is not yet in place. In part due to the lack of a regulatory framework the government's National Office of Broadcasting (ONT) requires broadcasters to pay a licensing fee of 120,000 dinars (approximately $75,000), and while that license is not necessary to broadcast, it confers a certain amount of legitimacy that broadcasters need to draw advertisers. The large fee is difficult for new start-up stations and the new stations feel that the fees provide an unfair advantage for the older more established private groups organized under the previous regime.

== Internet ==
- Top level domain (TLD): .tn
- Access: Available throughout the country using a fibre-optic backbone
- Internet Service Providers (ISPs): 12 (2005)
- International bandwidth: 62 Gbit/s in 2012, 50 Gbit/s in 2010, 1.3 Gbit/s in 2006
- Internet users: 4,196,564 (2012), 840,000 (2005); 410,000 (2001)
- Internet penetration: 39.1% (2011), 36.8% (2010), 17.1% (2007), 9.7% (2005), 2.8% (2000)
- Fixed (wired) Internet subscriptions: 604,102 (2011); 543,290 (2010); 253,149 (2007); 150,220 (2005); 36,657 (2000)
- Broadband Internet subscribers: 544,392 or 5.1% (2011), 481,810 or 4.6% (2010), 372,818 or 3.6% (2009), 43,845 or 0.4% (2006)
- Facebook subscribers: 2,602,640 (2011)
- Facebook penetration: 24.5% (2011)
- Public CyberCafés: 350 (2005)

== Information and communications technology ==
The Tunisian government considers information and communications technology (ICT) an important tool to boost the country's economy and to adapt the education system to the opportunities available from using Information Technology (IT) as a tool. E-commerce, e-learning, and e-medicine are all areas of strong interest where the Government is seeking international partnership and investments. During the last 15 years, several important efforts were made to invest in ICT and the Internet. Physical infrastructures were modernised. In July 2004 the World Bank approved a $13 million loan to the Tunisian government to support the government effort in accelerating its ICT reforms. Though, beyond the high priority the government is giving to ICT, development of telecommunications in Tunisia has been slower than expected compared to other developing countries in Middle East and North Africa.

== 2005 World Summit on the Information Society ==
The first World Summit on the Information Society (WSIS) was held in Geneva in 2003. Tunisia hosted the second World Summit in November 2005. The Tunisian government took the initiative to host the summit in 1998. It was organised by the International Telecommunication Union (ITU) under the auspices of UNESCO. A declaration of Principles and Plan of Action were approved in order to bridge the digital gap between developing and developed countries within the World Information Society.

== See also ==
- Higher School of Communication of Tunis
- Moez Chakchouk
- Media of Tunisia
- Economy of Tunisia
