= Internet in Tunisia =

The Internet in Tunisia played an important role in the dramatic events of the Arab Spring which began in Tunisia. The ouster of previous president of Tunisia Zine El Abidine Ben Ali ushered in more open access and use of the Internet. Political leaders in Tunisia are making use of social media to communicate with the electorate. Restructuring the Tunisian Internet Agency under the auspices of the Ministry of Information and Communication Technologies is one of the items that the transition government is working on.

== Access ==
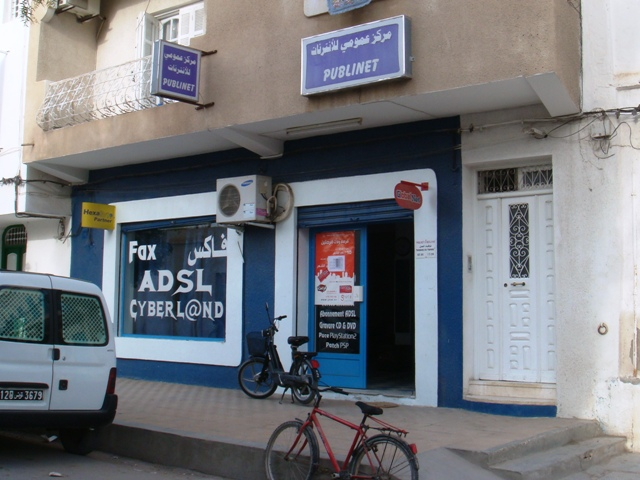
Internet cafe in Kairouan, Tunisia, in 2009

Tunisia has one of the most developed telecommunications infrastructures in North Africa with broadband prices among the lowest in Africa. Internet access is available throughout the country using a fibre-optic backbone and international access via submarine cables, terrestrial and satellite links. Tunisia's international bandwidth reached 37.5 Gbit/s in 2010, up from 1.3 Gbit/s in 2006.

In March 2010 there were 3,600,000 Internet users, 33.9% of the population, up from 9.3% in 2006. This compares favorably with the world average of 30.2%, the African average of 11.4%, and the Middle East average of 31.7%. There were 114,000 broadband subscriptions. 84% of Internet users accessed the Internet at home, 75.8% at work, and 24% use public Internet cafés. There were 2,602,640 Facebook users in June 2011 for a 24.5% penetration rate. This compares well with the 10.3% rate for the world as a whole, 3.0% for Africa, and the 7.5% rate for the Middle East.

As of December 2019, there were 7,898,534 Tunisian users on the internet, approximately 66.8% of the country's total population.

The Ministry of Communication Technologies established the Tunisian Internet Agency (ATI) to regulate the country’s Internet and domain name system (DNS) services. The ATI is also the gateway from which all of Tunisia’s eleven Internet service providers (ISPs) lease their bandwidth. Six of these ISPs are public (ATI, INBMI, CCK, CIMSP, IRESA and Defense's ISP); the other five — 3S Global Net, HEXABYTE, TopNet, Tunisia Telecom, Ooredoo Tunisia, and Orange Tunisia — are private.

The government has energetically sought to expand internet access. The ATI reports 100% connectivity in the education sector (universities, research laboratories, primary and secondary schools). Government-brokered "free Internet" programs provide web access for the price of a local telephone call and increased competition among ISPs has lowered costs and significantly reduced economic barriers to Internet access. Those for whom personal computers remain prohibitively expensive may also access the internet from more than 300 cybercafés set up by the authorities.

== Censorship ==
Internet censorship in Tunisia decreased significantly following the ouster of President Zine El Abidine Ben Ali, as the new acting government removed filters on social networking sites such as Facebook and YouTube. Tunisia is listed on Reporters Without Borders list of Countries Under Surveillance in 2011.

Prior to the Tunisian revolution Internet censorship in Tunisia was extensive. The OpenNet Initiative classified Internet filtering as pervasive in the political, social, and Internet tools areas and as selective in the conflict/security area in August 2009.

== See also ==
- Media of Tunisia
- Internet censorship in the Arab Spring
- Telecommunications in Tunisia
