= Moez Chakchouk =

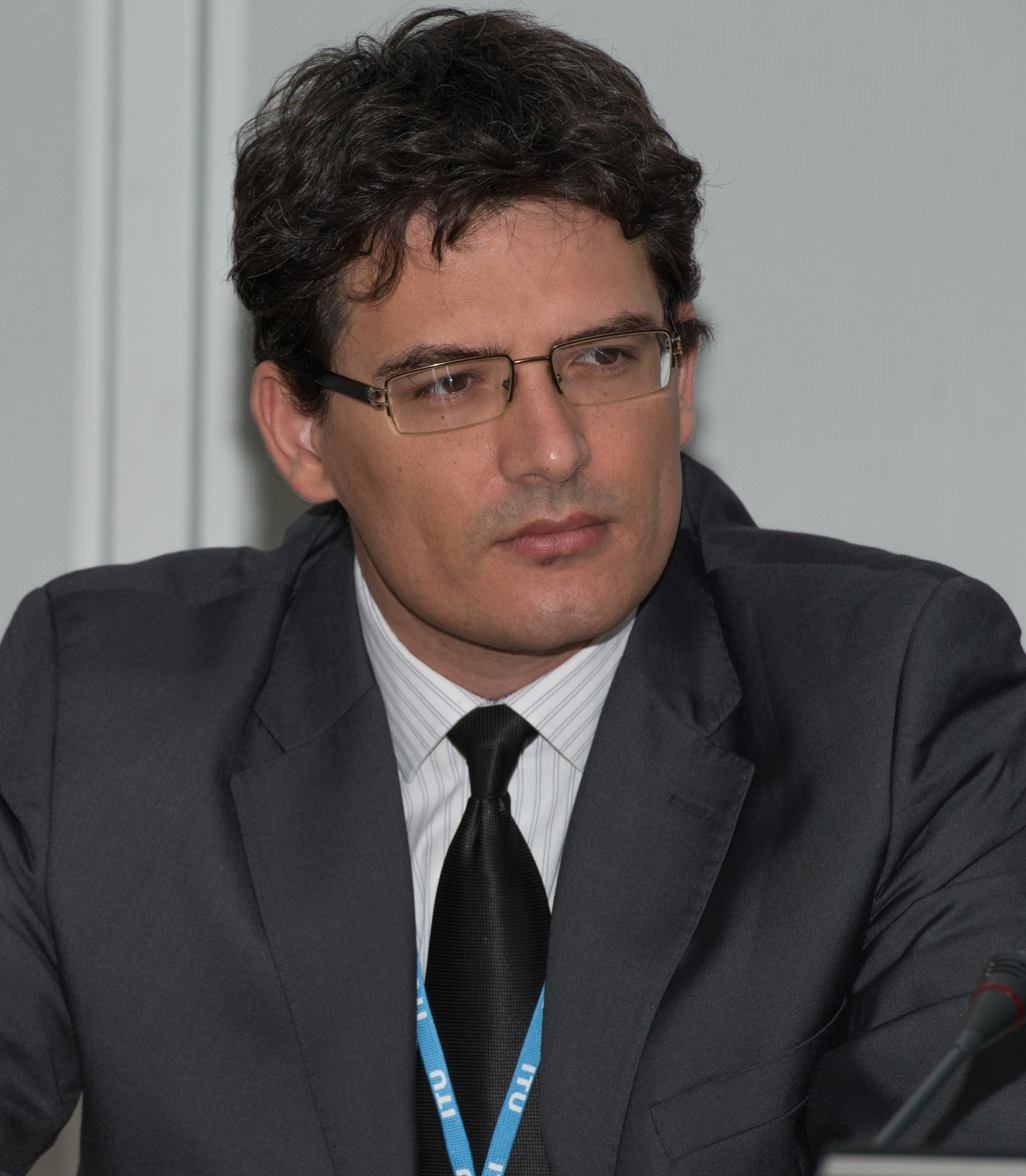
- Moez Chakchouk at a conference in 2014

Minister of Transport
- In office 2 September 2020 – 11 October 2021
- President: Kais Saied
- Prime Minister: Hichem Mechichi
- Preceded by: Mohamed Fadhel Kraiem
- Succeeded by: Rabii Majidi

Personal details
- Born: July 12, 1975 (age 50) Sousse, Tunisia
- Education: Higher School of Communication of Tunis, BA in telecommunications, 1998; National Engineering School of Tunis, MS in telecommunications, 2001; Paris Descartes University, PhD in applied mathematics, 2009
- Profession: Diplomat and telecommunications engineer

Moez Chakchouk (Arabic: معز شقشوق), born in Sousse on 12 July 1975, is the director of government affairs and regulatory policy at Packet Clearing House, the international organization responsible for providing operational support and security to critical internet infrastructure, including Internet exchange points and the core of the domain name system. Chakchouk was previously the transport minister of Tunisia (2020-2021), assistant director-general for communication and information at UNESCO (2018-2020), chairman and CEO of the Tunisian Post (2015-2018), and chairman and CEO of Agence Tunisienne d'Internet.

== Early life and education ==
A native of Ksour Essef in Mahdia Governorate, Chakchouk graduated in 1998 from Sup'Com, the École supérieure des postes et des telecommunications. He went on to take an MS in telecommunications from the National Engineering School of Tunis in 2001, and a Ph.D. in applied mathematics and telecommunications from the Paris Descartes University and the Tunis El Manar University in 2009.

== Career ==
=== Director ===
Chakchouk began his career in 1998, as a research engineer at the Tunisian CERT, the center for studies and research in telecommunications. From 2003 to 2005, he directed the R&D project RACINES (Representation, analysis and communication of digital images). In 2005, he left the CERT for the Instance Nationale des Telecommunications, or INT, Tunisia's independent telecommunication regulatory authority; first as chief of technical department, later as head of interconnection & access. In May 2010, he was appointed Chargé de mission to the Minister of Communications, overseeing telecommunication sector development and the promotion of broadband.

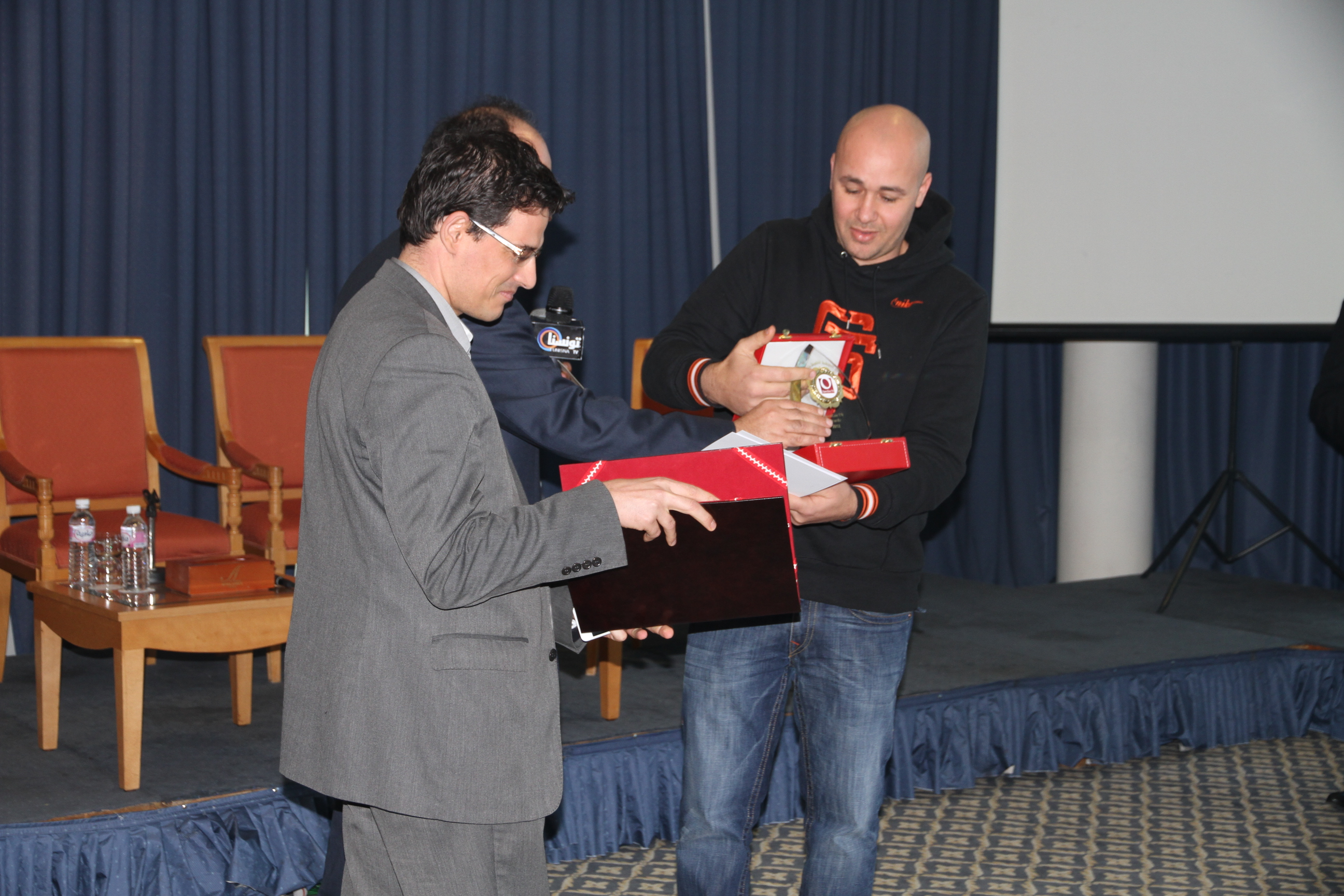
OpenGov Tunisia 2013 Award to Moez Chakchouk as chairman and CEO of ATI

In the wake of the Tunisian revolution of 2011, Chakchouk was appointed chairman and CEO of the Tunisian Internet Agency, (ATI). He overhauled the organization, substantially redefining its role in the Tunisian economy, privatizing, introducing competition, and opening the sector to new market entrants. He went on to establish Tunisia's first internet exchange point, TunIXP, and remains president of its management association. He is widely cited as being responsible for the establishment of open and transparent dialogue on internet governance in the country. He also served on the board of directors of the Office National de la Télédiffusion, Tunisia's national broadcasting corporation, from 2010 to 2013.

Chakchouk was appointed chairman and CEO of the Tunisian Post on 22 April 2015.

From 2 September 2020 to 11 October 2021, Chakchouk served as the transport minister of Tunisia.

=== International and civic engagement ===
Chakchouk is internationally known as an expert in the information and communication technologies, regulation and internet governance.

He is involved with different global organizations, in several forums and conferences, working on such issues; locally, regionally and worldwide. Since January 2014, he has been a commissioner within the prestigious Global Commission on Internet Governance. As a speaker, he is particularly brilliant through his international advocacy for an inclusive governance model for cyber security.

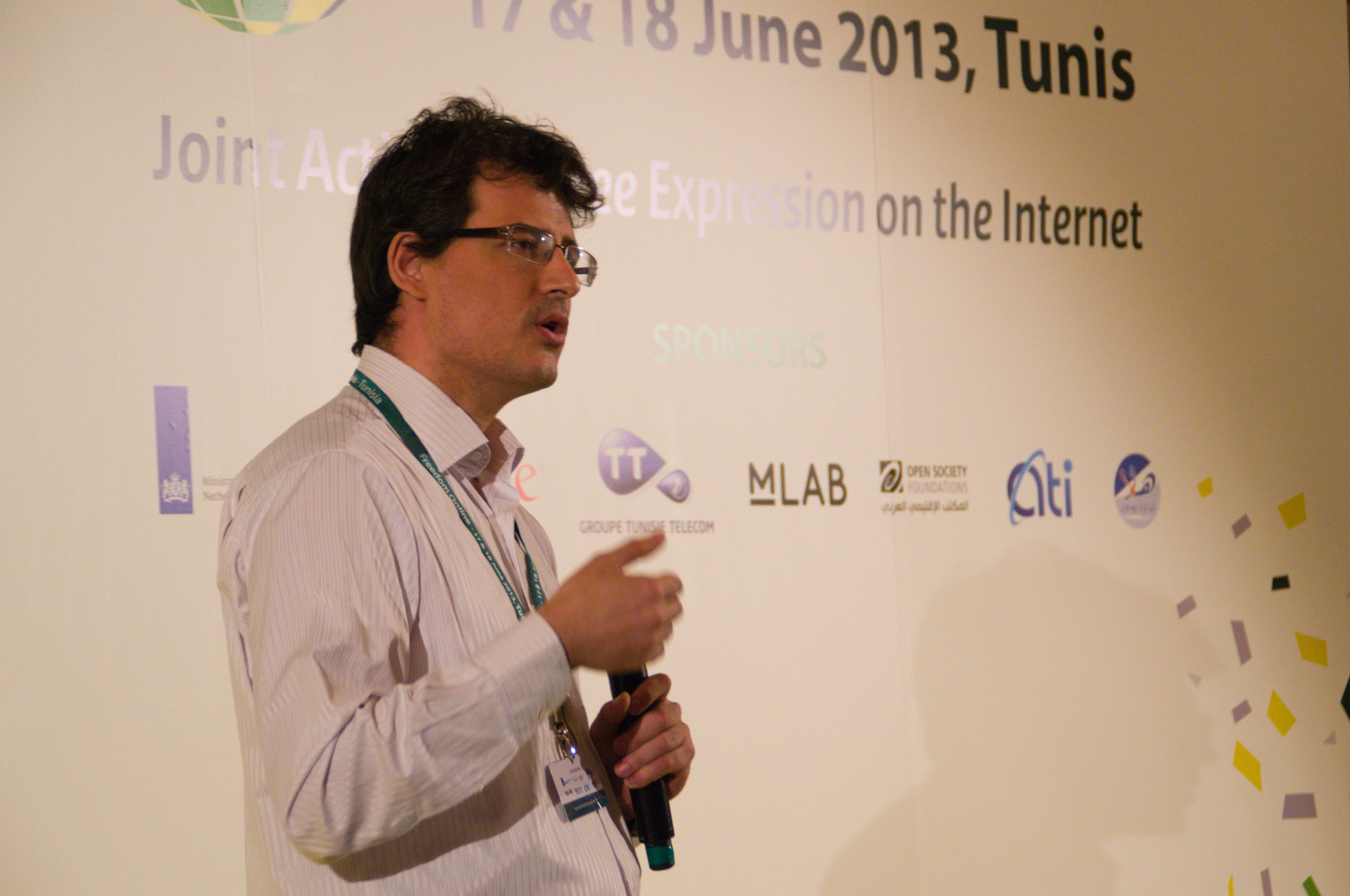
Chakchouk at the third Freedom Online Conference in Tunis, Tunisia 2013

Chakchouk is a leading defender of online human rights as well as a promoter of the community engagement for the development of the internet in Tunisia. In 2011, by principles, he strongly opposed the return of censorship and surveillance of the Internet in Tunisia, and has moreover won the case brought against the ATI.

In June 2013, while chairing the organizing committee of the Freedom Online Conference, he launched the 404Labs, an innovation lab open for the civil society and located at the basement which was the censorship symbol.

Chakchouk, as member of the non-profit NGO (CLibre) for the promotion of free digital culture, has helped the implementation of the first MESH Network in Tunisia, in the city of Sayada.

== Personal life ==
Chakchouk is married and the father of two.
