= Nawaat =

Tunisian independent blog

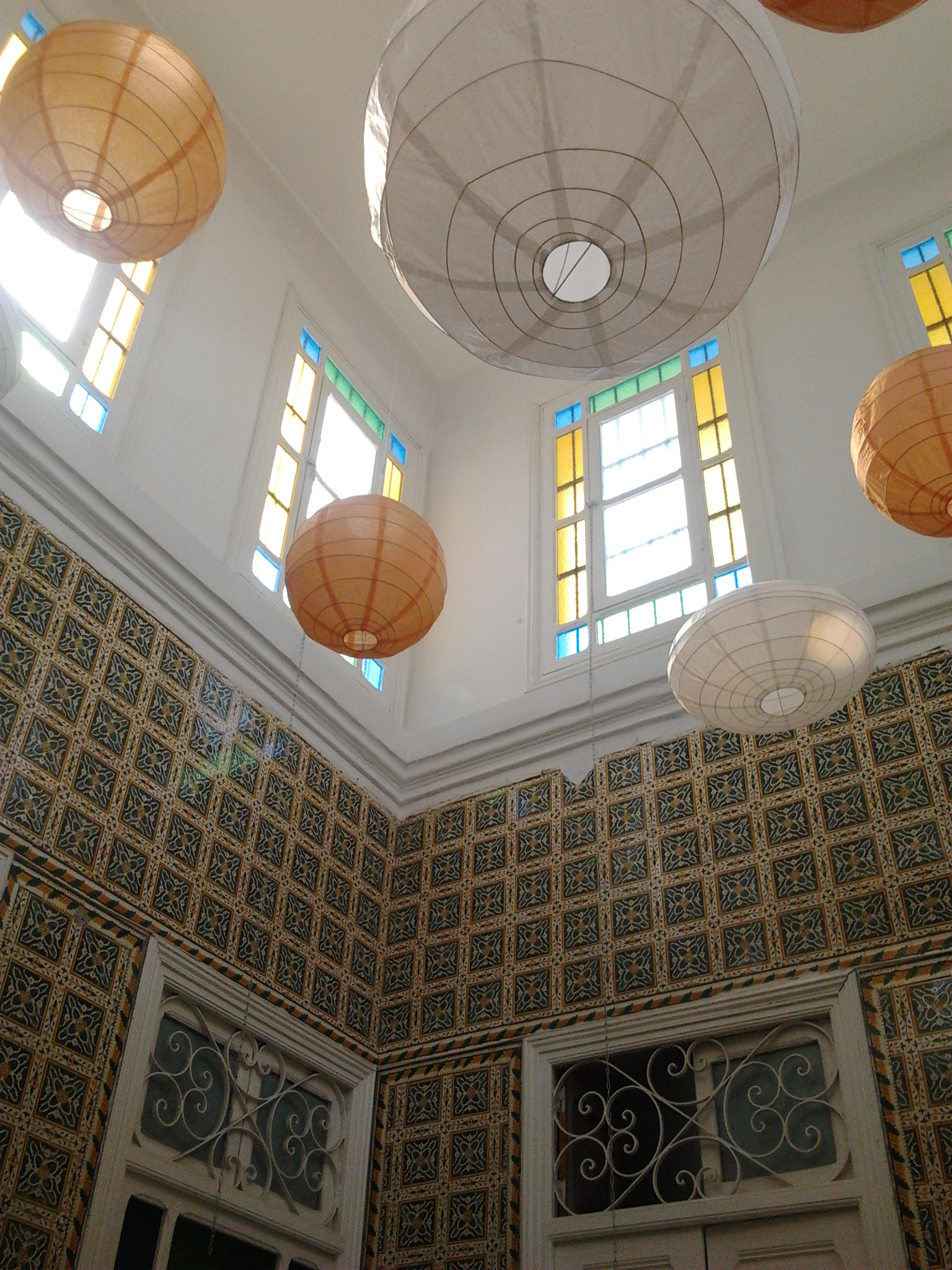
- Nawaat from the inside
- Formation: 2004
- Type: Activist Organization
- Headquarters: Tunis, Tunisia
- Official language: French, Arabic, English
- Key people: Sami Ben Gharbia, Riadh Guerfali, Sufian Guerfali, Malek Khadraoui
- Website: nawaat.org

Nawaat (Arabic: نواة) is an independent collective blog co-founded by Tunisians Sami Ben Gharbia, Sufian Guerfali and Riadh Guerfali in 2004, with Malek Khadraoui joining the organization in 2006. The goal of Nawaat's founders was to provide a public platform for Tunisian dissident voices and debates. Nawaat aggregates articles, visual media, and other data from a variety of sources to provide a forum for citizen journalists to express their opinions on current events. The site does not receive any donations from political parties. During the events leading to the Tunisian Revolution of 2011, Nawaat advised Internet users in Tunisia and other Arab nations about the dangers of being identified online and offered advice about circumventing censorship. Nawaat is an Arabic word meaning core. Nawaat has received numerous awards from international media organizations in the wake of the Arab Spring wave of revolutions throughout the Middle East and North Africa.

== History ==
=== Early years ===
Nawaat was co-founded by Sami Ben Gharbia, Sufian Guerfali and Riadh Guerfali. The site went online on April 5, 2004, as a forum for Tunisian citizens and diaspora to be able to express themselves free of censorship from the government of Zine El-Abidine Ben Ali. Since its launch, the site has posted thousands of print and visual media items focused on human rights, freedom of the press, politics, and culture in Tunisia, primarily through the French and Arabic languages but also frequently with English language contributions. The Ben Ali government established the Tunisian Internet Agency (ATI) in 1996 to monitor all Internet communications within the borders of Tunisia. Because of Nawaat's frequent challenges to the Tunisian government's restrictions on Internet communications, it became the target of ATI censors shortly after its inception. The OpenNet Initiative survey of 2006-2007 indicated that the Tunisian government was blocking Nawaat and several other dissident sites. ATI would block users' attempts to access Nawaat with Smartfilter software manufactured by the United States company Secure Computing, displaying a standard 404 "File Not Found" error message on their web browsers. Some of Nawaat's earliest contributions focused on election fraud and other forms of disenfranchisement during the re-election of Ben Ali in 2004, which the incumbent won with 94.49% of the popular vote. In addition, Nawaat aggregated a variety of commentaries exploring the role of Islam in government and contemporary relations between Arab nations and the Western world. Nawaat also featured contributions from human rights advocates from the Arab world as well as Iran and other nations with large Muslim populations. The site's staff often wrote opinion pieces castigating Arab governments with harsh censorship laws or promoting anti-censorship initiatives. The editors also called regularly for the release of imprisoned free-speech advocates including Alaa Abd El-Fattah and Abdel Monem Mahmoud.

==== Coverage of self-immolation of Mohamed Bouazizi and Sidi Bouzid riots ====
Mohamed Bouazizi, a Tunisian street vendor, set himself on fire on December 17, 2010, resulting in his eventual death on January 4, 2011. This event catalyzed a series of street protests starting in the town of Sidi Bouzid that became the Tunisian Revolution. Nawaat provided commentary which contextualized the unfolding events and posted numerous articles about the unfolding events, which many Tunisians were able to access via mirror sites and other conduits. Nawaat covered the spread of protests until Zine El-Abidine Ben Ali fled the country with his family, posting news stories from international news sources, Arab journalists, and Tunisians inside the country and abroad. The site kept the focus on the underlying causes of the revolution as well, including restrictions on personal freedoms, imprisonment of opposition members, and economic stagnation.

==== TuniLeaks ====
Tunileaks was launched on November 28 on Nawaat.org, one hour after the whistle-blowing site Wikileaks unleashed cables on Tunisia. The first release contained 17 cables issued from the US Embassy in Tunisia, and the majority of them revealed exchanges between the embassy and the US State Department. Those revelations mainly dealt with the neglect of human rights in Tunisia and the restrictions on freedom of expression. The Tunisian government rapidly blocked access to TuniLeaks, first blocking https://web.archive.org/web/20150221084506/https://tunileaks.appspot.com/ (without the https), then on the next day blocked Google App Engine's IP Address (209.85.229.141) in order to block Tunileaks under https as well. Additionally, the electronic version of Al Akhbar, a Lebanese newspaper, was also censored in Tunisia for containing some cables released by Tunileaks.

==== Other support to revolution ====
One of Nawaat's innovative contributions during the revolution was identifying and translating videos and personal accounts of potential media interest that were distributed on Facebook and other social networking sites. By the time of Ben Ali's ouster, Facebook was one of the few sites not blocked by the government where protesters could post the accounts of the revolution. The Tunisian dialect in the sites' videos made them unintelligible to many native speakers of Arabic, and the Nawaat staff's translation efforts resulted in many videos of protests and Tunisian security service crackdowns being broadcast on Al-Jazeera and other international news outlets. Nawaat and its affiliates made utilized the Posterous blogging platform to distribute material to the international press. Al-Jazeera had been banned from the country by the Ben Ali government and the videos provided by Nawaat were one of the most reliable sources of valuable video footage during the revolution. Nawaat also utilized its extensive network of internet activists to assist with mobilization of protesters through social media. Sami Ben Gharbia noted that one of the goals of Nawaat was to bridge the gap between collective action through social media and more traditional protest movement tactics.

=== Post-revolution activities ===
On the day of Ben Ali's flight from Tunisia, most sites previously blocked by ATI were available to Tunisian Internet users. ATI, still a functioning agency after the revolution, ceased censorship of opposition sites but in the following months began blocking sites deemed to be pornographic or inciting violence. At the direction of the military tribunal, five Facebook sites criticizing the army were blocked by ATI in May 2011. Nawaat has continued to monitor the activities of ATI, which is still staffed by most of the same employees from the Ben Ali era. In addition, Nawaat has focused efforts on training activists in Internet technology, assisting NGOs with similar missions, monitoring elections, and continuing to publish content on human rights and social issues. The Nawaat staff created the first Tunisian Hackerspace, a space where collaborative Internet technology projects can be discussed among members of the Arab Internet activist community along with worldwide partners. Hackerspace initiatives have included promotion of Arabic language Wikimedia proliferation.

==== Nawaatleaks ====
On March 27, 2014, Nawaat.org launched an anonymous whistleblowing initiative in order to support transparency and spot corruption. The initiative is based on the GlobaLeaks platform and the Tor technology and accessible in Arabic and French. In collaboration with GlobaLeaks, the Nawaat team created a special page that deploys a number of open source applications and techniques which protect those leaking confidential documents and files. This software even protects whistleblowers from the Nawaat team itself, which thanks to these techniques will not be able to identify the identity of those who leak information through their address emails, IP addresses, names or their geographic locations. To provide them with further protection, the Nawaat team will as usual and before the publication of any leaked confidential document, delete all meta data which increases the possibility of identifying the electronic source of documents in its different formats: audio, video clips, photos or texts.

== Facts and figures ==
- Nawaat.org ranks 54916 in internet traffic by Alexa.
- The site receives an average of 87,244 page views per day.
- The estimated worth of Nawaat.org is US$15,479 according to ValueIs.

=== Notable Founders ===
Sami Ben Gharbia, one of the co-founders of Nawaat.org. is a blogger and civil society advocate. He is listed on Foreign Policy magazine's 100 Most Influential Global Thinkers for 2011, and shares the 24th rank with Daniel Domscheit-Berg (a former deputy of WikiLeaks founder Julian Assange) and Russian lawyer Alexei Navalny. Ben Gharbia is known for connecting with Ethan Zuckerman's Global Voices project, and founding TuniLeaks, exclusive WikiLeaks on Tunisia, by bringing WikiLeaks into the closed society of pre-revolutionary Tunisia, and pumping it through Nawaat Group Blog.

Riadh Guerfali is a prizewinning Tunisian blogger, also known online by his pen name "Astrubal". He received the NetCitizen prize which is awarded by French press freedom campaigners Reporters Without Borders (RSF) and Internet giant Google, for his work to promote freedom of expression on the Internet.

== Awards ==
Nawaat has won many major awards starting from 2011 for the role it played prior to, during the Tunisian Revolution and after.

- The Reporters Without Borders Netizen Prize

Nawaat was awarded the Reporters Without Borders Netizen Prize, on the eve of the World Day Against Cyber-Censorship. It is an award that goes to a Netizen, a blogger, online journalist, or cyber-dissident who has helped promote freedom of expression on the Internet. The winner receives a 2,500 euros prize. Nawaat won against finalists from Bahrain, Belarus, Thailand, China, and Vietnam. This annual award is sponsored by Google.

- The Index on Censorship Award

Nawaat won "the Index on Censorship Media Award" due to its project Tunileaks, a joint project with Wikileaks that dealt with Tunisian affairs and that confirmed, with cold documents, the widely criticised corruption of President Ben Ali's regime, and helped focus public discontent.

- The Electronic Frontier Foundation 2011 Pioneer Award
- The Digital Power Index 2012
- Nawaat was awarded by the National Union of Tunisian Journalists (SNJT) with the best interactive website prize for 2015.
- Arab eContent Award - Declined by Nawaat

Nawaat won the Arab eContent Award in the e-Inclusion & Participation category, an initiative of The World Summit Award (WSA). Nawaat declined the award, however, and refused to attend the Bahrain IT Expo 2011 Opening Ceremony to receive it from the Deputy Prime Minister of Bahrain and Chairman of the Supreme Committee for Information Technology and Communications, Sheikh Mohammed Bin Mubarak Al Khalifa. This was in protest against Bahrain’s Internet filtering practices, arrest of bloggers and human rights activists, and blocking of websites and blogs that criticize the Bahraini government and ruling family.

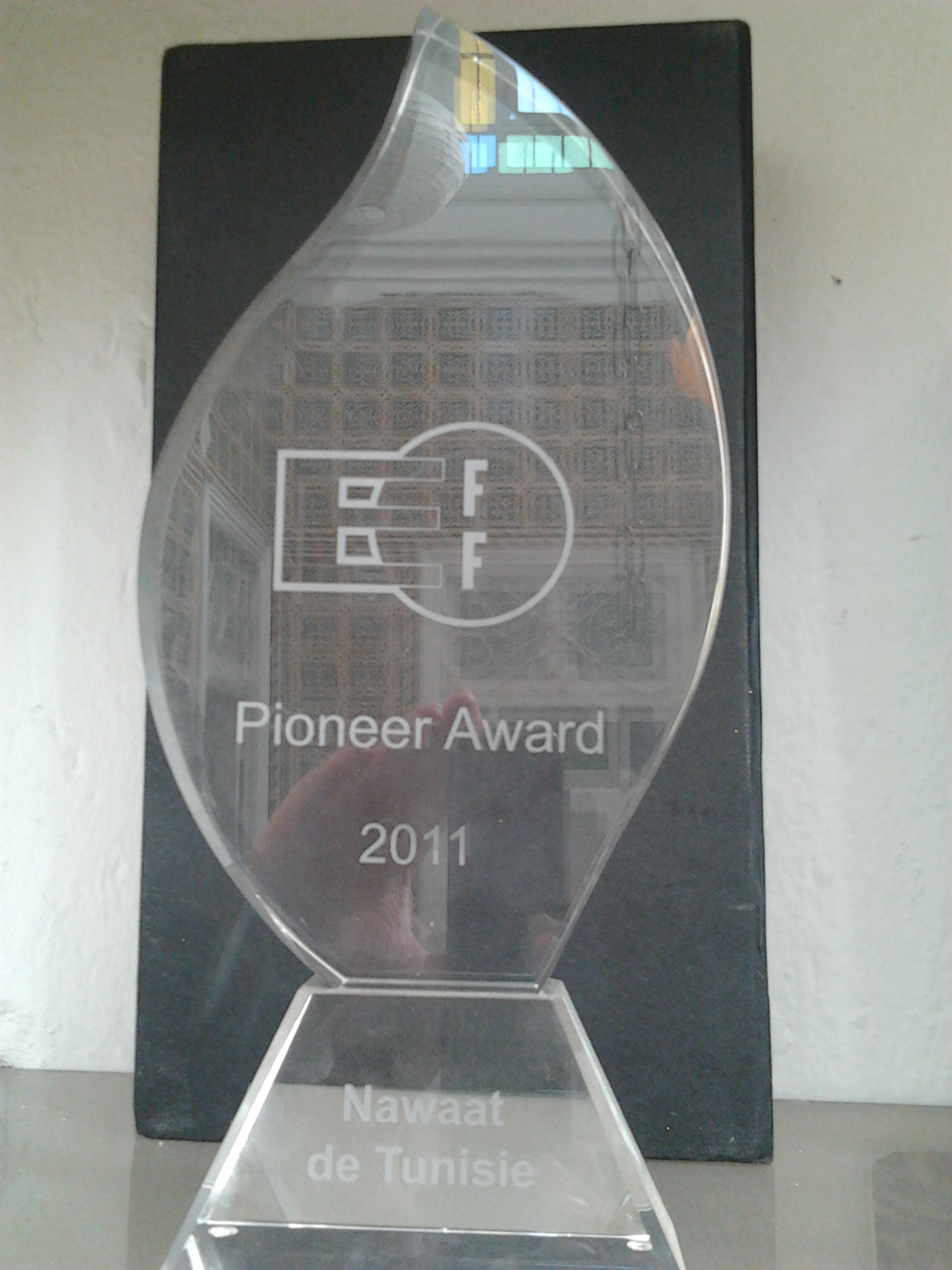
Prix EFF 2011 Pioneer Award - Electronic Frontier Foundation

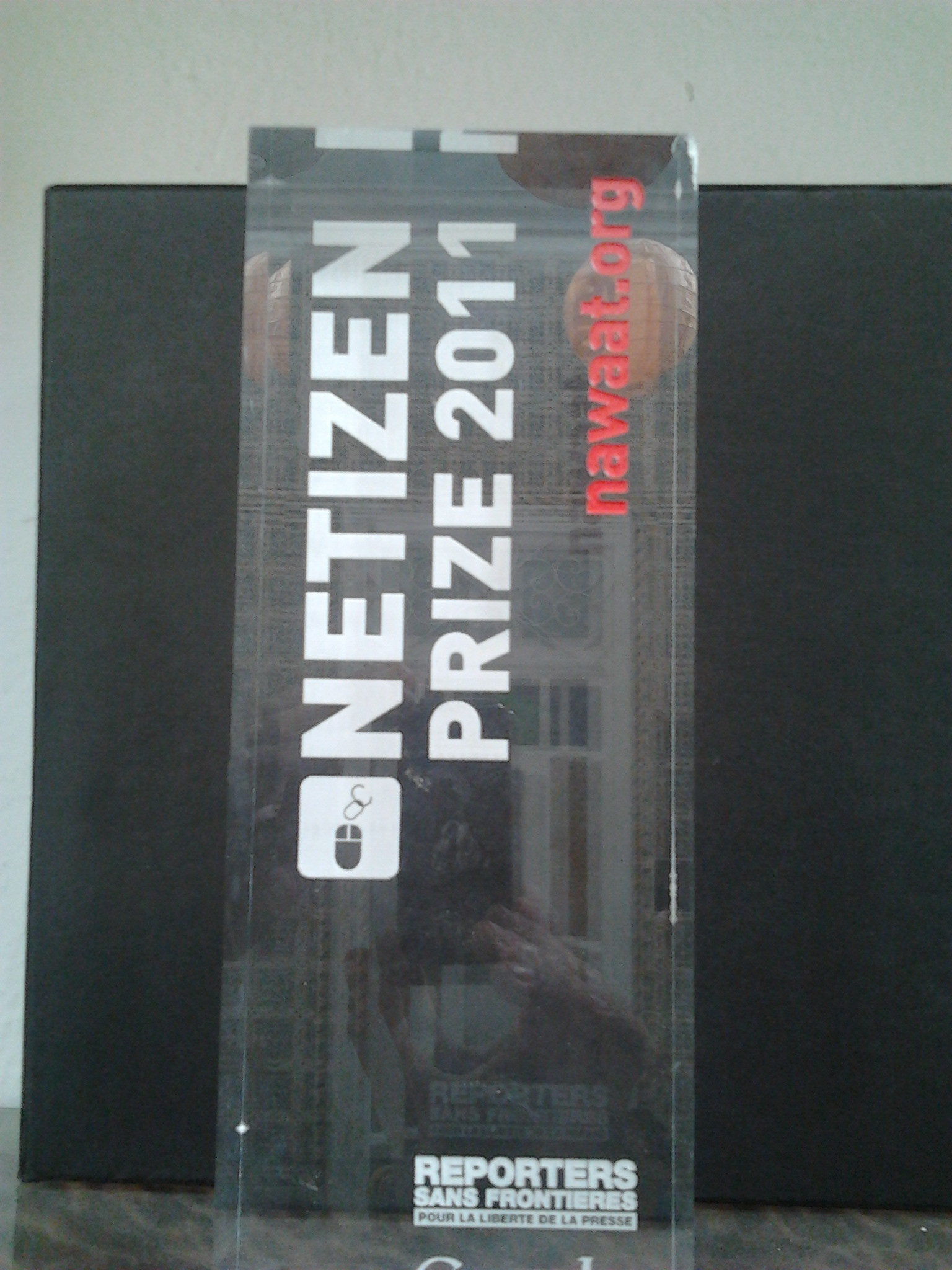
Prix Net-citoyen 2011 - Reporters sans frontières

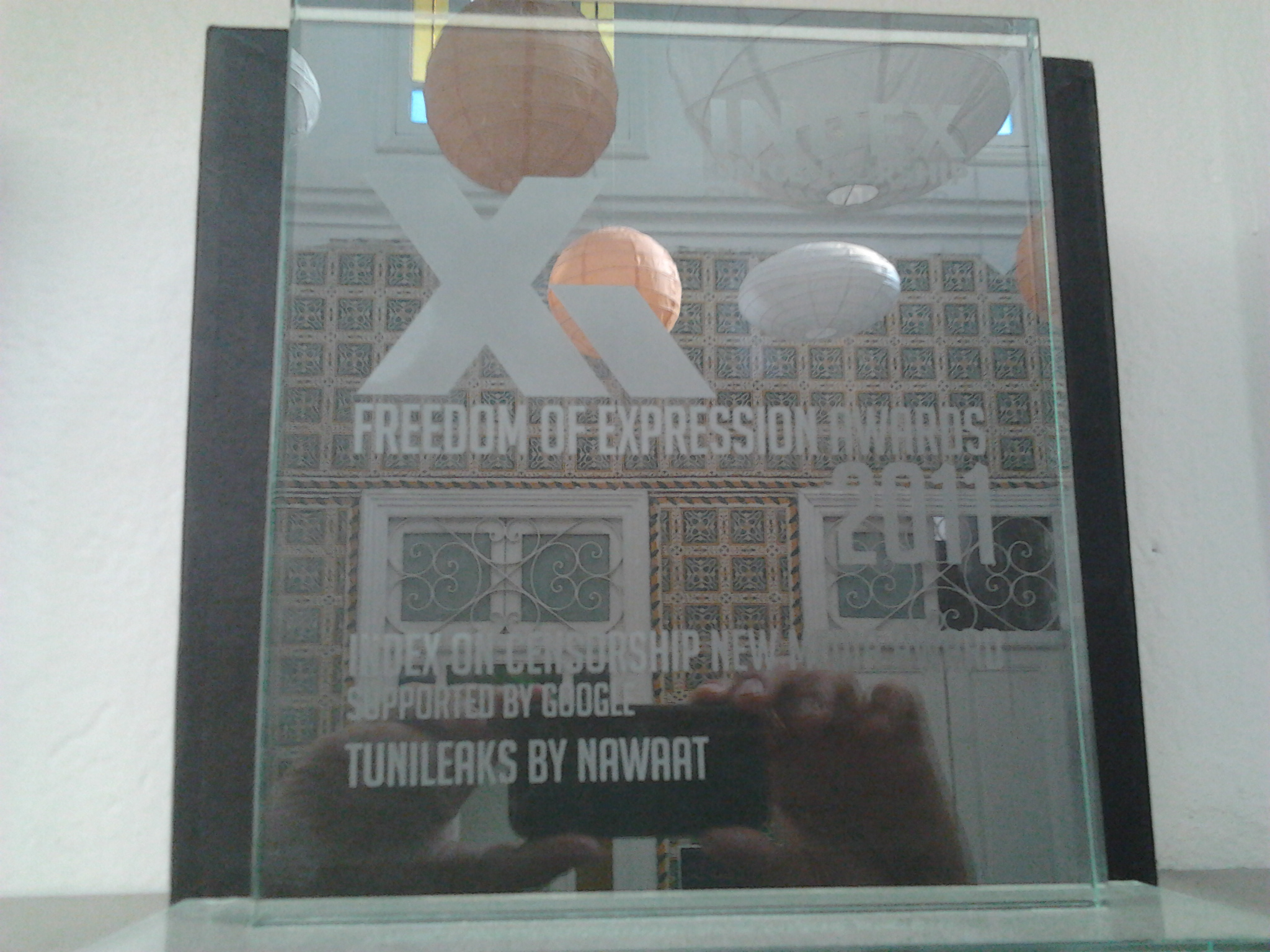
Index on Censorship 2010

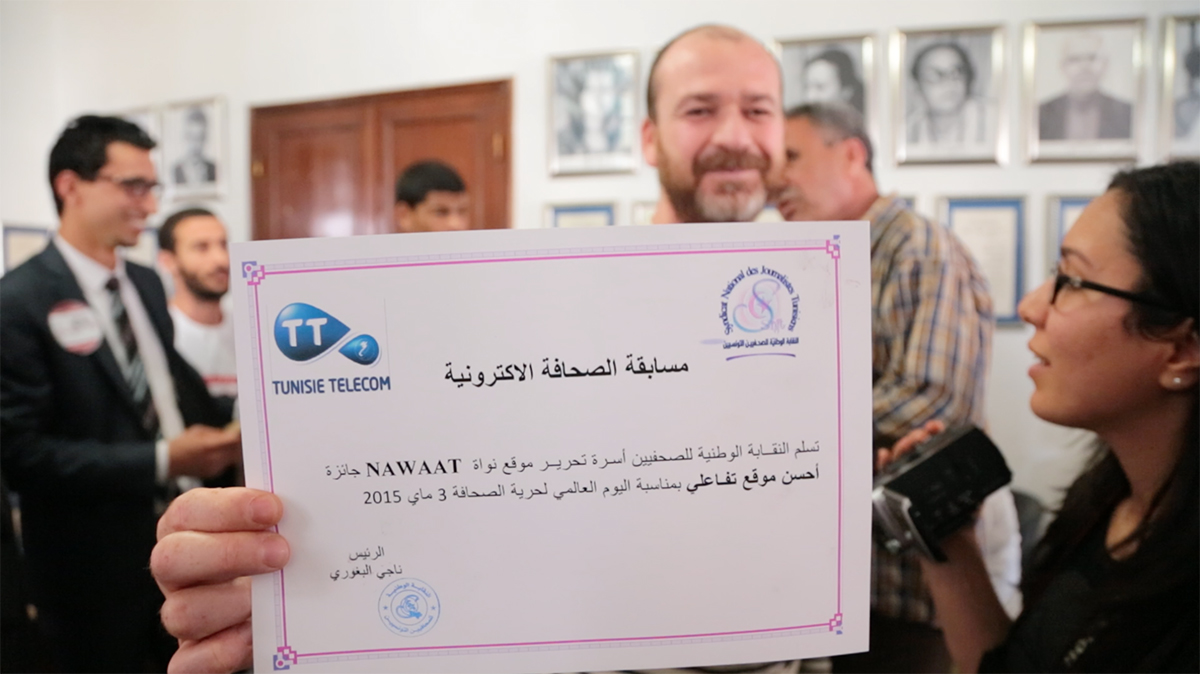
National Union of Tunisian Journalists Award 2015
