= Elgazala Technopark =

Technopark in Tunisia founded in 1999

Elgazala Technopark is the first technopark in Tunisia, founded in 1999 and covers a surface area of 90 ha.

It is located in the Greater Tunis area, in the North of the city of Ariana.

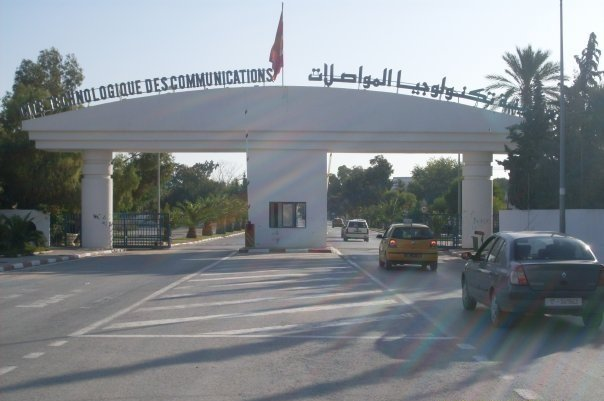
Entrance technopark el Ghazela

It belongs to the ministry of communication technologies and digital economy and was created as part of the overall strategy to develop communication technologies in Tunisia, Africa and worldwide. Elgazala Technopark is presented as an environment specialized in the development of small businesses (an incubator) as well as a location for multinational companies to prosper. The technopole campus also hosts the following University college specialized in telecommunications: the Institut supérieur des études technologiques en communications de Tunis. The Technopole is composed of 90 companies, including Microsoft, ST Microelectronics, Ericsson, and Alcatel Lucent.
