= Riadh Guerfali =

Tunisian advocate

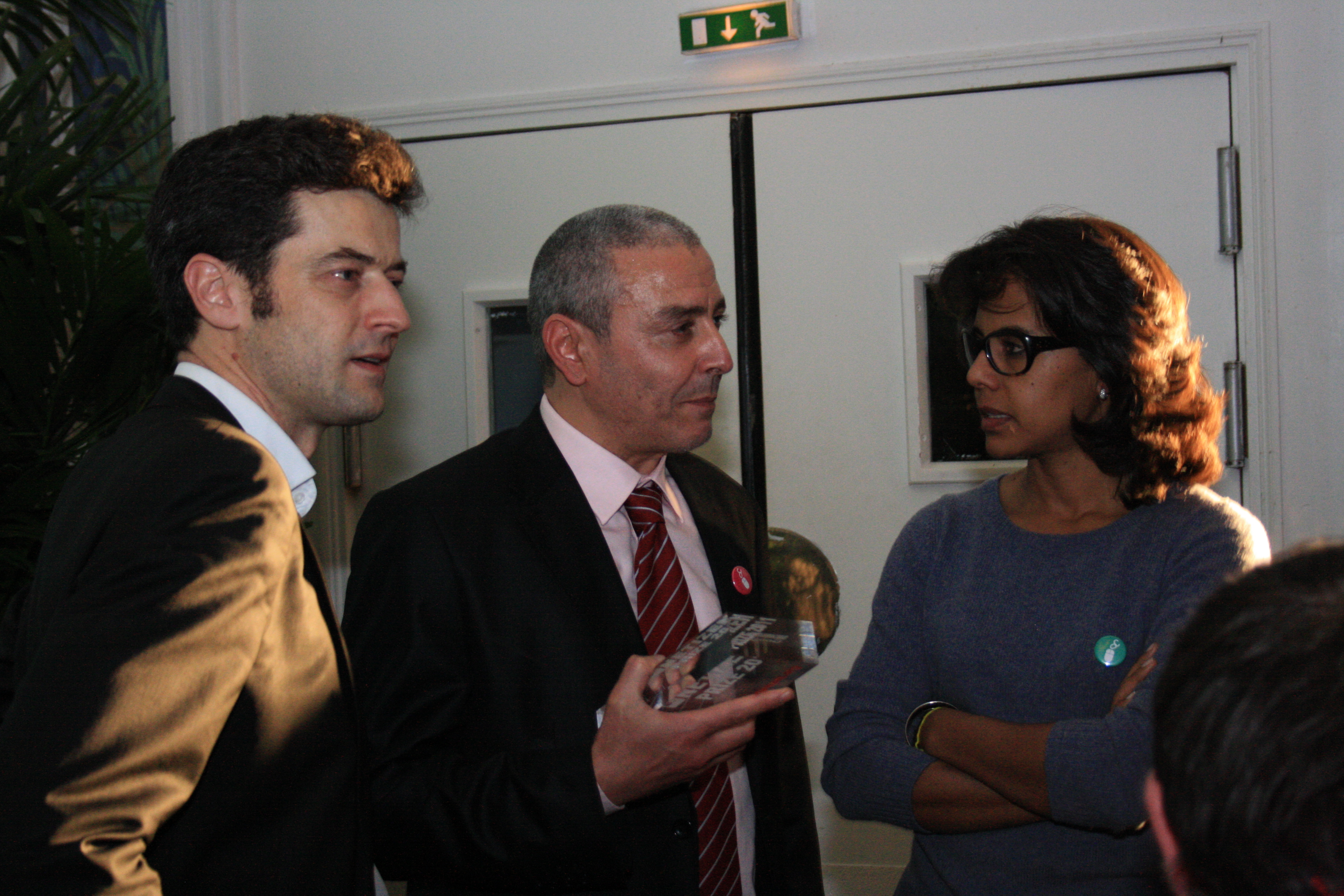

Riadh Guerfali, also known by the pseudonym Astrubal, is a Tunisian lawyer and human rights activist. He is best known for being a manager of the website Nawaat, which itself became a platform for organizing protesters during the Tunisian revolution.

== Online activities ==
In 2004, Apple updated its iconic 1984 advertisement to showcase the iPod. The following month, Guerfaili as Astrubal uploaded a mashup of that video replacing the Big Brother character with the Tunisian president, Zine El Abidine Ben Ali. This video was part of a broader anti-government propaganda campaign initially launched by Tunisian human rights activists in 2002.

Guerfali promotes citizen journalism on the Internet. The website Nawaat has been one of Guerfali's tools for promoting citizen journalism.

In 2011, Guerfali won a Netcitizen prize for promoting freedom of expression on the Internet. This prize was sponsored by Google and Reporters without Borders.
