= Tunisie Telecom =

Tunisian phone operator

- Type: Public limited company
- Industry: Telecommunications
- Founded: 17 April 1995; 31 years ago
- Headquarters: Tunis, Tunisia
- Number of locations: 2
- Area served: Worldwide
- Products: Fixed line and mobile telephony, Internet services,
- Owner: Tunisian State (65%), Dubai Holding (via TECOM-DIG) (35%)
- Number of employees: 6,400
- Website: www.tunisietelecom.tn

Tunisie Telecom is the incumbent telecom operator in Tunisia. Tunisie Telecom has more than 6 million subscribers in the fixed and mobile telephony, in Tunisia and abroad.

== History ==
Tunisie Telecom has an important role in improving the rate of internet penetration in Tunisia, which allowed it to have 140,000 subscribers at the end of April 2008.

In 2009, Huawei Marine Networks delivered the HANNIBAL submarine communications cable system for Tunisie Telecom across the Mediterranean Sea to Italy.

In September 2012, CEO Ali Ghodhbani retired and was succeeded by Mokhtar Mnakri, former CEO of Alcatel's subsidiary.

In 2014, Salah Jarraya was appointed CEO, succeeding Mnakri whose term had come to an end.

Following these social movements and strikes, Salah Jarraya resigned on July 2, 2015. In August 2015, Nizar Bouguila was appointed Chief Executive Officer (CEO).

Tunisie Telecom became a European telecoms operator with its 60% share purchase of the Maltese telecommunications company GO from the Emirati EIT for €200 million in June 2016.

Nizar Bouguila was replaced on September 19, 2017, by Mohamed Fadhel Kraiem.

On November 7, 2017, Tunisie Télécom signed a five-year contract with the Ministry of Communication Technologies and Digital Transformation of Tunisia to provide high-speed telecommunications services covering white zones.

Mohamed Fadhel Kraiem was replaced on April 14, 2020, by Samir Saïed following his entry into the government. On October 12, 2021, the board of directors decided to appoint Syrine Tlili as interim head of the company following Saïed’s appointment to the government.

In December 2021, the Malagasy group Axian, led by Hassanein Hiridjee, made the highest bid among potential buyers for Mauritanian telecom operator Mattel, a subsidiary of Tunisie Telecom. His proposal would be around 100 million euros (DTH 326,106,511.50).

On April 7, 2022, the company’s Chief Technical Officer, Lassâad Ben Dhiab, was appointed Chief Executive Officer (CEO).

== Activities ==
In 2010, Tunisie Telecom launched, in collaboration with the Tunisian Post, the remote mobile payment service MobiDinar.

In November 2014, Tunisie Telecom partnered with the Khechine Group to offer telecom benefits in exchange for advantages on the group's tourism services.
