= Sami Ben Gharbia =

Tunisian Internet activist and blogger

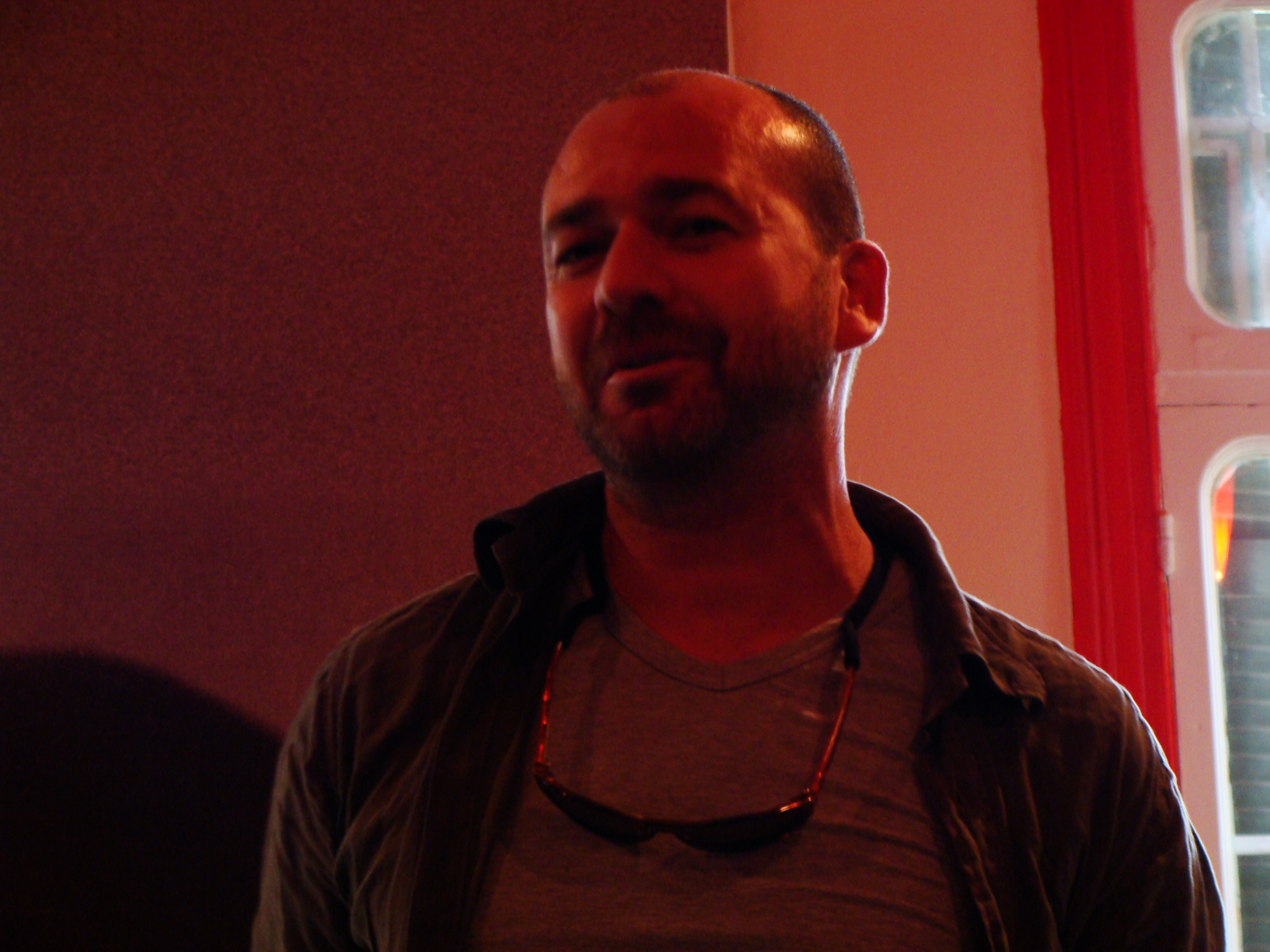
Ben Gharbia during the first Arab Bloggers Meeting in Beirut, Lebanon, in 2008

Sami Ben Gharbia is a Tunisian human rights campaigner, blogger, writer and freedom of expression advocate. He was a political refugee living in the Netherlands between 1998 and 2011. Sami is the author of the book (in French) Borj Erroumi XL. He is the Founding Director of the Advocacy arm of Global Voices Online and is a co-founder of the award-winning collective blog Nawaat, a Tunisian citizen journalism website which supported the Tunisian Revolution. He also co-founded The Arab Techies Collective and co-Organizer of The Arab Bloggers Conferences.

== Role in Tunisian Revolution ==
Ben Gharbia supported bloggers in Tunisia after the government began a policy of Internet censorship in Tunisia.

== Recognition ==
Foreign Policy named Sami Ben Gharbia as a major world influence in promoting government transparency.

Prince Claus Awards named Sami Ben Gharbia in 2012 for his innovative cyber-activism works mainly through social media.

Vrij Nederland named Sami Ben Gharbia as one of its 2012 Dwarsdenkers.

Yahoo! named Sami Ben Gharbia as one of the person of the year during the 2010 World Press Freedom for his work focused on Inter- net censorship.

Electronic Frontier Foundation awarded Nawaat's co-founders, including Ben Gharbia, with their 2011 Pioneer Award.
