= Ministry of Information and Communication Technologies (Tunisia) =

Ministry of Communication Technologies and Digital Transformation
- وزير تكنولوجيات الاتصال و التحول الرقمي
- Coat of Arms of Tunisia

Agency overview
- Agency executive: Nizar Ben Neji, Minister of Information and Communication Technologies
- Website: www.mtcen.gov.tn/

The Ministry of Communication Technologies and Digital Transformation of Tunisia (Arabic: وزارة تكنولوجيات الاتصال والتحول الرقمي) is a Tunisian cabinet-level governmental agency, in charge of organizing the communications sector of Tunisia. It is also concerned with the planning, controlling and supervision of activities directed at acquiring new technology and improving the sector.

== Organizational structure ==
=== Structure ===
The Ministry is headed by the Minister who is aided by the Secretary of State for Information, Internet and Free Software. The Cabinet of the Ministry consists of several different departments:

- Central recording office;
- Information, reception and public relations office;
- Office for following up decisions made by the ministerial council, the inner ministerial councils and the inter-ministerial councils;
- Office responsible for the operational system of communications help, safety and office hours;
- Office of Citizen Relations;
- Technology monitoring office;
- General affairs office;
- International cooperation, foreign relations and partnership office;
- Investors supervisory and approval office;
- Documentary management and documentation office;
- Advisory committees.

=== Functions ===
The Ministry has many responsibilities within the communications sector:

- Setting up strategic studies in the field of telecommunications;
- Supervising research programs and industrial activities, and fitting them to the sector’s requirements;
- Setting up the standards and specifications pertaining to the communications sector;
- Introducing the technological progress in the context of the economic and social development plans;
- Supervising investors and, where necessary, intervening in the concerned enterprises to help them obtain services that come under this sector in the best possible conditions;
- Supervising agents’ activities in the field of telecommunications and postal services;
- Establishing organizational and regulatory framework to ensure the sector operates correctly, and introducing the structural and functional changes required by the demands of efficiency and quality in this domain;
- Developing international cooperation and partnership in the field of telecommunications.

== See also ==
- Internet in Tunisia
- La Poste Tunisienne
- Tunisian Internet Agency
- Government of Tunisia

== Sources ==
- Ministry of Communication Technologies and Digital Transformation of Tunisia (English site)
