= .tn =

Country code top-level domain for Tunisia

- Introduced: 17 May 1991
- TLD type: Country code top-level domain
- Status: Active
- Registry: Agence tunisienne d'Internet
- Sponsor: Agence tunisienne d'Internet
- Intended use: Entities connected with Tunisia
- Actual use: Popular in Tunisia, has also been home to The Pirate Bay
- Registered domains: 59,849 (2024-02-11)
- Registration restrictions: Local residency requirement
- Structure: Registrations are directly at second level or at third level beneath various second-level names
- Registry website: .tn Registry site

.tn is the Internet country code top-level domain (ccTLD) for Tunisia.

== Second-level domains ==
Registrations can be made directly at the second level, or at the third level beneath these names (some of which are restricted):

- .com.tn
- .ens.tn
- .fin.tn
- .gov.tn
- .ind.tn
- .intl.tn
- .nat.tn
- .net.tn
- .org.tn
- .info.tn
- .perso.tn
- .tourism.tn
- .mincom.tn
