= Tunisian Internet Agency =

Coordinates: 36°49′25″N 10°10′36″E

Republic of Tunisia Tunisian Internet Agency (ATI)
- الوكالة التونسية للأنترنات

Agency overview
- Jurisdiction: Tunisia
- Headquarters: Mutuelleville, Tunis
- Agency executive: Jawher Ferjaoui, CEO
- Parent agency: Ministry of Information and Communication Technologies
- Website: www.ati.tn

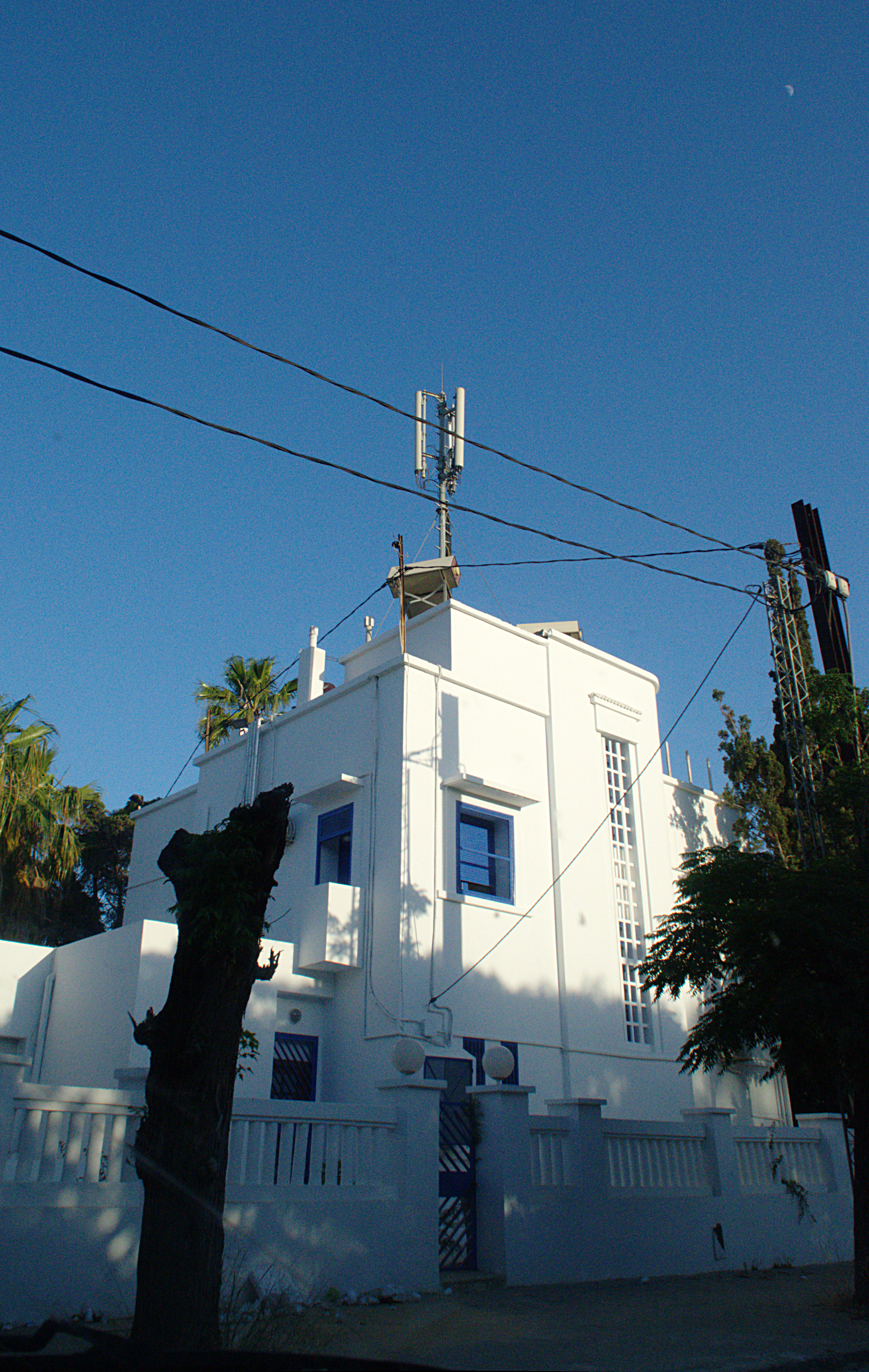
Headquarters of the ATI

The Tunisian Internet Agency, known by its acronym ATI (short for Agence tunisienne d'Internet), is the principal Tunisian ISP. Created on 12 March 1996, it is run by the Ministry of Communications, and has an equal mission to promote Internet usage in that country.

The ATI also has the task of contributing to the installation of networks in various fields (health, education and agriculture), to manage the national network and domain name (.tn) to launch websites and organize trainings and workshops.

Its customers are other ISPs, government agencies, state-run firms, research centres, etc. The ATI can thus regulate the entire national network because, except for public ISPs such as Tunisie Telecom, the five private suppliers (Orange Tunisia, 3S Global Net, HexaByte, Ooredoo Tunisia and Topnet) depend on it for the network's management.

== See also ==
- Censorship in Tunisia
- Internet censorship in Tunisia
