= Higher School of Communication of Tunis =

Academic institution in Tunisia

Coordinates: 36.8908°N 10.1833°E

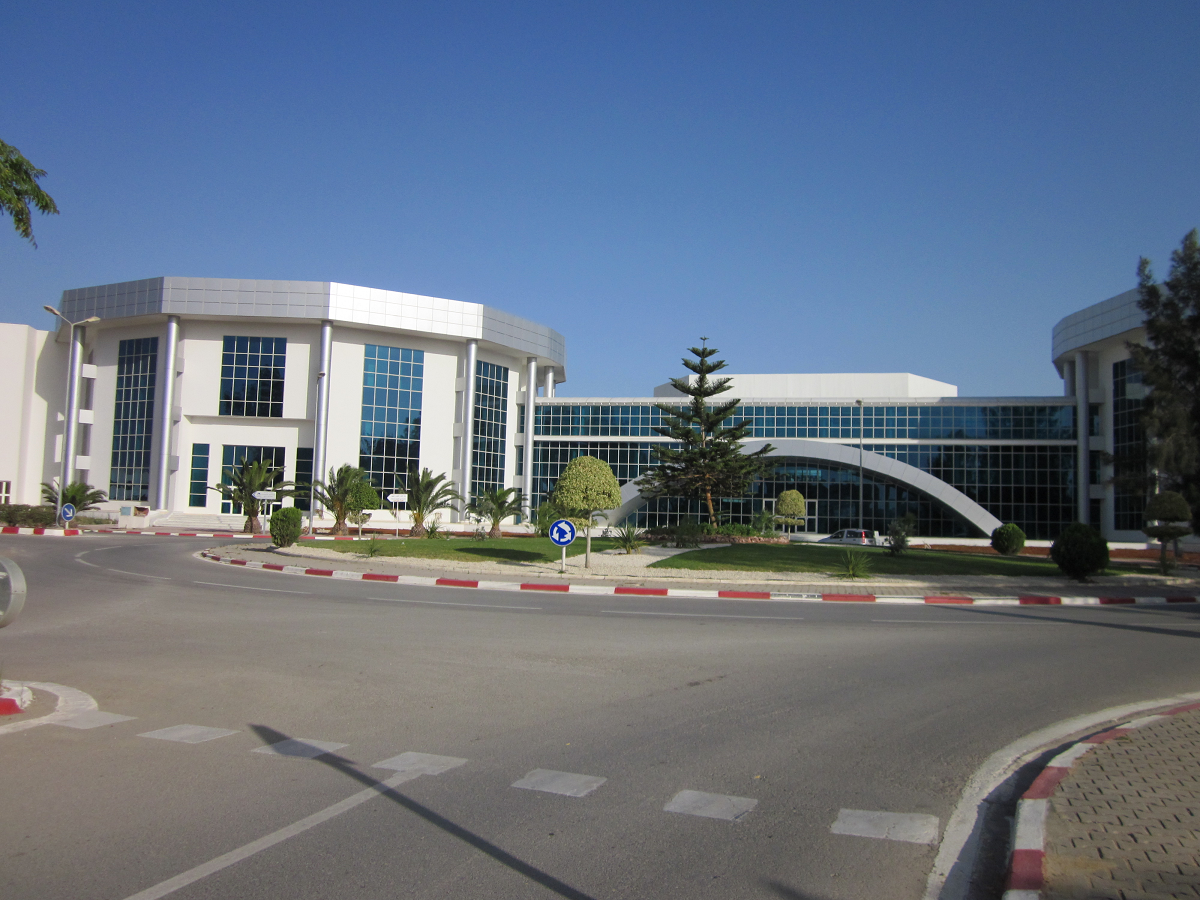
- Type: Public
- Established: 1998
- Rector: Mounir Frikha
- Location: Ariana, Tunisia
- Website: supcom.tn

Sup'Com (or SUP'COM or Higher School of Communication of Tunis or Engineering School of Communication of Tunis) (Arabic: المدرسة العليا للمواصلات بتونس), founded in 1998, is the main school of educating engineers in telecommunications in Tunisia. It is affiliated to the University of Carthage.

Member of the Réseau Méditerranéen des Ecoles d'Ingénieurs (Mediterranean engineering schools’ network), Sup’Com was admitted since December 2008 as an associated member in the Conférence des Grandes Écoles (CGE). It is the first foreign school to be associated internationally with the Institut Mines-Télécom.

Sup’Com is an engineering school, which main objectives are:

- Training engineers to implement and manage services, systems and telecommunication networks.
- Contributing to the national effort related to the scientific and technological research in the field of information and communication technology (ICT).
- The in-service or qualifying training, of senior managers in the ICT field.

== Departements and laboratories ==
There are 4 departments in Sup’ Com:

- Electronics, physics and distribution
- Applied mathematics, signals and communications
- Computer and networks
- Economy, management, law, humanities and languages

The supervised practice takes place in the diverse laboratories of the university:

- Electronics, optics, transmission and microwaves laboratory
- Simulation and computer-aided design laboratory
- Mobile networks laboratory
- Broadcasting and multimedia laboratory
- Computer science laboratory with microcomputers and working stations connected to networks
- Switching systems laboratory
- Language laboratory

== Diplomas ==
SUP' COM awards the following diplomas:

- National Diploma in Telecommunications Engineering
- Master's degree in ICT
- Master's degree in Telecommunications
- PhD in ICT
- Merit Award in ICT.

== See also ==
- Carthage University
