= La Poste Tunisienne =

La Poste tunisienne
- Industry: Postal Service
- Founded: 1847
- Headquarters: Tunisia
- Website: www.poste.tn

La Poste tunisienne (Arabic : البريد التونسي, French: La Poste tunisienne) is the company responsible for postal service in Tunisia. It also operates banking services within Tunisia as well. The company was founded in 1847, and was admitted to the Universal Postal Union in 1878. The Tunisian Post opened the Caisse d'épargne nationale tunisienne ("Tunisian National Savings Bank") in 1956.
