= Bonn (electoral district) =

Electoral district of Germany

95 Bonn
- Electoral district for the Bundestag
- Bonn in 2025
- State: North Rhine-Westphalia
- Population: 329,700 (2019)
- Electorate: 230,215 (2021)
- Major settlements: Bonn
- Area: 141.1 km^{2}

Current electoral district
- Created: 1949
- Party: CDU
- Member: Hendrik Streeck
- Elected: 2025

Bonn is an electoral constituency (German: Wahlkreis) represented in the Bundestag. It elects one member via first-past-the-post voting. Under the current constituency numbering system, it is designated as constituency 95. It is located in southwestern North Rhine-Westphalia, comprising the city of Bonn.

Bonn was created for the inaugural 1949 federal election. From 2021 to 2025, it has been represented by Katrin Uhlig of the Alliance 90/The Greens. Since 2025 it has been represented by Hendrik Streeck of the Christian Democratic Union of Germany.

== Geography ==
Bonn is located in southwestern North Rhine-Westphalia. As of the 2021 federal election, it is coterminous with the independent city of Bonn.

== History ==
Bonn was created in 1949, then known as Bonn-Stadt und -Land. It acquired its current name in the 1965 election. In the 1949 election, it was North Rhine-Westphalia constituency 10 in the numbering system. From 1953 through 1961, it was number 69. From 1965 through 1998, it was number 63. From 2002 through 2009, it was number 97. In the 2013 through 2021 elections, it was number 96. From the 2025 election, it has been number 95.

Originally, the constituency comprised the city of Bonn and the district of Landkreis Bonn. It acquired its current borders in the 1965 election.

| Election | No. | Name | Borders |
|---|---|---|---|
| 1949 | 10 | Bonn-Stadt und -Land | Bonn city; Landkreis Bonn district |
| 1953 | 69 | Bonn-Stadt und -Land | Bonn city; Landkreis Bonn district |
| 1957 | 69 | Bonn-Stadt und -Land | Bonn city; Landkreis Bonn district |
| 1961 | 69 | Bonn-Stadt und -Land | Bonn city; Landkreis Bonn district |
| 1965 | 63 | Bonn | Bonn city |
| 1969 | 63 | Bonn | Bonn city |
| 1972 | 63 | Bonn | Bonn city |
| 1976 | 63 | Bonn | Bonn city |
| 1980 | 63 | Bonn | Bonn city |
| 1983 | 63 | Bonn | Bonn city |
| 1987 | 63 | Bonn | Bonn city |
| 1990 | 63 | Bonn | Bonn city |
| 1994 | 63 | Bonn | Bonn city |
| 1998 | 63 | Bonn | Bonn city |
| 2002 | 97 | Bonn | Bonn city |
| 2005 | 97 | Bonn | Bonn city |
| 2009 | 97 | Bonn | Bonn city |
| 2013 | 96 | Bonn | Bonn city |
| 2017 | 96 | Bonn | Bonn city |
| 2021 | 96 | Bonn | Bonn city |
| 2025 | 95 | Bonn | Bonn city |

== Members ==
The constituency was first represented by Konrad Adenauer, the first Chancellor of the Federal Republic of Germany, from 1949 until his death in 1967. He was a member of the Christian Democratic Union (CDU). In the 1969 election, he was succeeded by fellow CDU member Alo Hauser, who served until 1983. Hans Daniels of the CDU was then elected and served two terms. Party fellow Editha Limbach became representative in 1990, followed by Norbert Hauser in 1998. The constituency was won by the Social Democratic Party (SPD) for the first time in 2002, and represented by Ulrich Kelber. He was re-elected in 2005, 2009, 2013, and 2017. Kelber resigned in January 2020 after being elected Federal Commissioner for Data Protection. Katrin Uhlig won the constituency for the Greens in 2021. In 2025 Hendrik Streeck won the seat for the CDU.

| Election | Member | Party | % |
|---|---|---|---|
| 1949 | Konrad Adenauer | CDU | 54.9 |
| 1953 | Konrad Adenauer | CDU | 68.8 |
| 1957 | Konrad Adenauer | CDU | 68.5 |
| 1961 | Konrad Adenauer | CDU | 60.3 |
| 1965 | Konrad Adenauer | CDU | 59.6 |
| 1969 | Alo Hauser | CDU | 37.9 |
| 1972 | Alo Hauser | CDU | 51.8 |
| 1976 | Alo Hauser | CDU | 54.1 |
| 1980 | Alo Hauser | CDU | 49.3 |
| 1983 | Hans Daniels | CDU | 55.1 |
| 1987 | Hans Daniels | CDU | 50.3 |
| 1990 | Editha Limbach | CDU | 44.8 |
| 1994 | Editha Limbach | CDU | 44.8 |
| 1998 | Norbert Hauser | CDU | 42.8 |
| 2002 | Ulrich Kelber | SPD | 39.7 |
| 2005 | Ulrich Kelber | SPD | 42.0 |
| 2009 | Ulrich Kelber | SPD | 33.3 |
| 2013 | Ulrich Kelber | SPD | 38.2 |
| 2017 | Ulrich Kelber | SPD | 34.9 |
| 2021 | Katrin Uhlig | GRÜNE | 25.2 |
| 2025 | Hendrik Streeck | CDU | 33.3 |

== Election results ==
=== 2025 election ===
Federal election (2025): Bonn
| Notes: | Blue background denotes the winner of the electorate vote. Pink background denotes a candidate elected from their party list. Yellow background denotes an electorate win by a list member, or other incumbent. A ✓ or ✗ denotes status of any incumbent, win or lose respectively. | | | | | | |
| Party | Candidate | Votes | % | ±% | Party votes | % | ±% |
|---|---|---|---|---|---|---|---|
| CDU | Hendrik Streeck | 63,973 | 33.3 | ▲8.9 | 50,413 | 26.2 | ▲3.6 |
| Greens | ✗ Katrin Uhlig | 46,819 | 24.4 | ▼0.9 | 44,136 | 22.9 | ▼4.3 |
| SPD | Jessica Rosenthal | 41,567 | 21.6 | ▼3.5 | 34,068 | 17.7 | ▼4.9 |
| AfD | Wolfgang Truckenbrodt | 15,681 | 8.2 | ▲4.1 | 17,186 | 8.9 | ▲4.7 |
| Left | Jürgen Repschläger | 14,776 | 7.7 | ▲4.1 | 23,994 | 12.5 | ▲7.0 |
| BSW | | | | | 6,911 | 3.6 | |
| FDP | Anna Heimanm | 4,737 | 2.5 | ▼10.1 | 9,995 | 5.2 | ▼6.7 |
| Volt | Thomas Peter | 3,018 | 1.6 | 0.0 | 2,147 | 1.1 | ▲0.1 |
| Tierschutzpartei | | | | | 1,252 | 0.6 | ▼0.1 |
| FW | Robert Viebahn | 934 | 0.5 | ▼0.2 | 419 | 0.2 | ▼0.3 |
| PARTEI | | | | ▼1.5 | 877 | 0.5 | ▼0.4 |
| PdF | Fosi Audi | 536 | 0.3 | | 287 | 0.1 | ▲0.1 |
| dieBasis | | | | ▼1.1 | 338 | 0.2 | ▼0.8 |
| Team Todenhöfer | | | | | 270 | 0.1 | ▼0.8 |
| BD | | | | | 128 | 0.1 | |
| MERA25 | | | | | 141 | 0.1 | |
| Values | | | | | 92 | 0.0 | |
| MLPD | | | | ▼0.1 | 59 | 0.0 | 0.0 |
| Pirates | | | | | | | ▼0.3 |
| Humanists | | | | | | | ▼0.1 |
| ÖDP | | | | | | | ▼0.1 |
| Gesundheitsforschung | | | | | | | ▼0.1 |
| Bündnis C | | | | | | | ▼0.1 |
| SGP | | | | | | | 0.0 |
| Informal votes | | 1,651 | | | 980 | | |
| Total valid votes | | 192,042 | | | 192,713 | | |
| Turnout | | 193,693 | 84.7 | ▲4.1 | | | |
| CDU gain from Greens | Majority | 17,154 | 8.9 | | | | |

=== 2021 election ===
Federal election (2021): Bonn
| Notes: | Blue background denotes the winner of the electorate vote. Pink background denotes a candidate elected from their party list. Yellow background denotes an electorate win by a list member, or other incumbent. A ✓ or ✗ denotes status of any incumbent, win or lose respectively. | | | | | | |
| Party | Candidate | Votes | % | ±% | Party votes | % | ±% |
|---|---|---|---|---|---|---|---|
| Greens | Katrin Uhlig | 46,467 | 25.2 | ▲16.8 | 50,174 | 27.2 | ▲13.1 |
| SPD | Jessica Rosenthal | 46,251 | 25.1 | ▼9.7 | 41,641 | 22.6 | ▲2.4 |
| CDU | Christoph Jansen | 44,872 | 24.4 | ▼7.7 | 41,551 | 22.5 | ▼7.2 |
| FDP | Alexander Graf Lambsdorff | 23,198 | 12.6 | ▲2.1 | 21,902 | 11.9 | ▼3.8 |
| AfD | Hans Neuhoff | 7,448 | 4.0 | ▼2.0 | 7,750 | 4.2 | ▼3.1 |
| Left | Ilja Bergen | 6,675 | 3.6 | ▼2.1 | 10,026 | 5.4 | ▼4.1 |
| Volt | Livia Juliane Genn | 2,919 | 1.6 | | 1,955 | 1.1 | |
| PARTEI | Moritz Van den Bergh | 2,700 | 1.5 | 0.0 | 1,661 | 0.9 | ▼0.2 |
| dieBasis | Gregor Berneiser | 2,101 | 1.1 | | 1,823 | 1.0 | |
| Team Todenhöfer | | | | | 1,817 | 1.0 | |
| Tierschutzpartei | | | | | 1,371 | 0.7 | ▲0.4 |
| FW | Jutta Acar | 1,183 | 0.6 | ▲0.2 | 897 | 0.5 | ▲0.3 |
| Pirates | | | | | 611 | 0.3 | 0.0 |
| Humanists | | | | | 196 | 0.1 | 0.0 |
| ÖDP | | | | | 162 | 0.1 | ▼0.1 |
| V-Partei3 | | | | | 130 | 0.1 | ▼0.1 |
| LIEBE | | | | | 118 | 0.1 | |
| Gesundheitsforschung | | | | | 113 | 0.1 | 0.0 |
| Bündnis C | | | | | 106 | 0.1 | |
| LfK | | | | | 77 | 0.0 | |
| LKR | Reinhard Limbach | 158 | 0.1 | | 75 | 0.0 | |
| du. | | | | | 68 | 0.0 | |
| MLPD | Roger Stamm | 138 | 0.1 | | 57 | 0.0 | 0.0 |
| PdF | | | | | 53 | 0.0 | |
| NPD | | | | | 51 | 0.0 | ▼0.1 |
| DKP | | | | | 47 | 0.0 | 0.0 |
| SGP | | | | | 12 | 0.0 | 0.0 |
| Informal votes | | 1,447 | | | 1,113 | | |
| Total valid votes | | 184,110 | | | 184,444 | | |
| Turnout | | 185,557 | 80.6 | ▲1.3 | | | |
| Greens gain from SPD | Majority | 216 | 0.1 | | | | |

=== 2017 election ===
Federal election (2017): Bonn
| Notes: | Blue background denotes the winner of the electorate vote. Pink background denotes a candidate elected from their party list. Yellow background denotes an electorate win by a list member, or other incumbent. A ✓ or ✗ denotes status of any incumbent, win or lose respectively. | | | | | | |
| Party | Candidate | Votes | % | ±% | Party votes | % | ±% |
|---|---|---|---|---|---|---|---|
| SPD | ✓ Ulrich Kelber | 62,377 | 34.9 | ▼3.3 | 36,119 | 20.2 | ▼5.8 |
| CDU | Claudia Lücking-Michel | 57,330 | 32.0 | ▼5.4 | 53,334 | 29.8 | ▼6.5 |
| FDP | Alexander Graf Lambsdorff | 18,724 | 10.5 | ▲4.4 | 28,113 | 15.7 | ▲7.4 |
| Greens | Katja Dörner | 15,056 | 8.4 | ▼0.1 | 25,197 | 14.1 | ▲0.4 |
| AfD | Sascha Ulbrich | 10,882 | 6.1 | ▲3.5 | 13,136 | 7.3 | ▲3.1 |
| Left | Jürgen Repschläger | 10,193 | 5.7 | ▲1.3 | 17,133 | 9.6 | ▲3.2 |
| PARTEI | Dominik Haffner | 2,617 | 1.5 | ▲0.9 | 1,950 | 1.1 | ▲0.5 |
| Tierschutzpartei | | | | | 684 | 0.4 | |
| Pirates | Mehdi Ebrahimi Zadeh | 857 | 0.5 | ▼1.9 | 663 | 0.4 | ▼2.2 |
| DiB | | | | | 431 | 0.2 | |
| FW | Werner Bader | 806 | 0.5 | | 412 | 0.2 | ▲0.1 |
| AD-DEMOKRATEN | | | | | 325 | 0.2 | |
| BGE | | | | | 312 | 0.2 | |
| V-Partei³ | | | | | 273 | 0.2 | |
| ÖDP | | | | | 253 | 0.1 | 0.0 |
| Die Humanisten | | | | | 211 | 0.1 | |
| DM | | | | | 206 | 0.1 | |
| NPD | | | | | 147 | 0.1 | ▼0.4 |
| Volksabstimmung | | | | | 107 | 0.1 | ▼0.1 |
| Independent | Quo-Chir Luong | 99 | 0.1 | | | | |
| MLPD | | | | | 81 | 0.0 | 0.0 |
| Gesundheitsforschung | | | | | 69 | 0.0 | |
| DKP | | | | | 30 | 0.0 | |
| SGP | | | | | 22 | 0.0 | 0.0 |
| Informal votes | | 1,498 | | | 1,231 | | |
| Total valid votes | | 178,941 | | | 179,208 | | |
| Turnout | | 180,439 | 79.3 | ▲2.0 | | | |
| SPD hold | Majority | 5,047 | 2.9 | ▲2.2 | | | |

=== 2013 election ===
Federal election (2013): Bonn
| Notes: | Blue background denotes the winner of the electorate vote. Pink background denotes a candidate elected from their party list. Yellow background denotes an electorate win by a list member, or other incumbent. A ✓ or ✗ denotes status of any incumbent, win or lose respectively. | | | | | | |
| Party | Candidate | Votes | % | ±% | Party votes | % | ±% |
|---|---|---|---|---|---|---|---|
| SPD | ✓ Ulrich Kelber | 65,955 | 38.2 | ▲4.8 | 44,909 | 25.9 | ▲3.4 |
| CDU | Claudia Lücking-Michel | 64,778 | 37.5 | ▲6.3 | 62,844 | 35.3 | ▲5.1 |
| Greens | Katja Dörner | 14,797 | 8.6 | ▼1.6 | 23,686 | 14.7 | ▼2.3 |
| FDP | Guido Westerwelle | 10,416 | 6.0 | ▼13.1 | 14,418 | 8.3 | ▼10.7 |
| Left | Paul Schäfer | 7,523 | 4.4 | ▼0.7 | 10,988 | 6.3 | ▼0.7 |
| AfD | Andrea Konorza | 4,382 | 2.5 | | 7,389 | 4.3 | |
| Pirates | Klaus Benndorf | 4,113 | 2.4 | | 4,418 | 2.6 | ▲0.3 |
| PARTEI | Carlo Metterhausen | 907 | 0.5 | | 1,079 | 0.6 | |
| BIG | | | | | 955 | 0.6 | |
| NPD | | | | | 801 | 0.5 | ▼0.2 |
| PRO | | | | | 358 | 0.2 | |
| FW | | | | | 309 | 0.2 | |
| ÖDP | | | | | 293 | 0.2 | 0.0 |
| Nichtwahler | | | | | 217 | 0.1 | |
| Volksabstimmung | | | | | 197 | 0.1 | 0.0 |
| Party of Reason | | | | | 132 | 0.1 | |
| REP | | | | | 92 | 0.1 | ▼0.1 |
| RRP | | | | | 47 | 0.0 | 0.0 |
| MLPD | | | | | 42 | 0.0 | 0.0 |
| BüSo | | | | | 25 | 0.0 | 0.0 |
| PSG | | | | | 21 | 0.0 | 0.0 |
| Die Rechte | | | | | 19 | 0.0 | |
| Informal votes | | 2,143 | | | 1,775 | | |
| Total valid votes | | 172,871 | | | 173,239 | | |
| Turnout | | 175,014 | 77.3 | ▲0.8 | | | |
| SPD hold | Majority | 1,177 | 0.7 | ▼1.4 | | | |

=== 2009 election ===
Federal election (2009): Bonn
| Notes: | Blue background denotes the winner of the electorate vote. Pink background denotes a candidate elected from their party list. Yellow background denotes an electorate win by a list member, or other incumbent. A ✓ or ✗ denotes status of any incumbent, win or lose respectively. | | | | | | |
| Party | Candidate | Votes | % | ±% | Party votes | % | ±% |
|---|---|---|---|---|---|---|---|
| SPD | ✓ Ulrich Kelber | 55,251 | 33.3 | ▼8.6 | 37,387 | 22.5 | ▼9.4 |
| CDU | Stephan Eisel | 51,674 | 31.2 | ▼8.3 | 51,654 | 31.1 | ▼3.6 |
| FDP | Guido Westerwelle | 31,606 | 19.1 | ▲10.4 | 31,483 | 19.0 | ▲5.3 |
| Greens | Katja Dörner | 16,856 | 10.2 | ▲4.0 | 26,573 | 16.0 | ▲2.7 |
| Left | Paul Schäfer | 8,381 | 5.1 | ▲2.1 | 11,624 | 7.0 | ▲2.6 |
| Pirates | | | | | 3,685 | 2.2 | |
| NPD | Andreas Kaschke | 1,211 | 0.7 | ▲0.1 | 1,049 | 0.6 | ▲0.2 |
| Tierschutzpartei | | | | | 786 | 0.5 | ▲0.1 |
| DIE VIOLETTEN | Ulrike Kraemer-Schwinn | 446 | 0.3 | | | | |
| FAMILIE | | | | | 443 | 0.3 | 0.0 |
| RENTNER | | | | | 280 | 0.2 | |
| REP | | | | | 244 | 0.1 | 0.0 |
| ÖDP | | | | | 208 | 0.1 | |
| Volksabstimmung | | | | | 137 | 0.1 | 0.0 |
| BüSo | Ilja Bertold Karpowski | 251 | 0.2 | | 87 | 0.1 | 0.0 |
| Centre | | | | | 87 | 0.1 | 0.0 |
| RRP | | | | | 74 | 0.0 | |
| DVU | | | | | 52 | 0.0 | |
| MLPD | | | | | 40 | 0.0 | 0.0 |
| PSG | | | | | 26 | 0.0 | 0.0 |
| Informal votes | | 1,898 | | | 1,655 | | |
| Total valid votes | | 165,676 | | | 165,919 | | |
| Turnout | | 167,574 | 76.4 | ▼4.8 | | | |
| SPD hold | Majority | 2,577 | 2.1 | ▼0.4 | | | |

=== 2005 election ===
Federal election (2005): Bonn
| Notes: | Blue background denotes the winner of the electorate vote. Pink background denotes a candidate elected from their party list. Yellow background denotes an electorate win by a list member, or other incumbent. A ✓ or ✗ denotes status of any incumbent, win or lose respectively. | | | | | | |
| Party | Candidate | Votes | % | ±% | Party votes | % | ±% |
|---|---|---|---|---|---|---|---|
| SPD | ✓ Ulrich Kelber | 71,537 | 42.0 | ▲2.3 | 54,523 | 31.9 | ▼0.7 |
| CDU | Stephen Eisel | 67,381 | 39.5 | ▲3.2 | 59,241 | 34.7 | ▼9.3 |
| FDP | Guido Westerwelle | 14,841 | 8.7 | ▼5.5 | 23,429 | 13.7 | ▲2.2 |
| Greens | Jens-Erik Kendzia | 10,505 | 6.2 | ▼1.4 | 22,776 | 13.3 | ▼2.3 |
| Left | Katina Schubert | 5,125 | 3.0 | ▲1.8 | 7,589 | 4.4 | ▲2.9 |
| NPD | Peter Malborn | 1,032 | 0.6 | | 823 | 0.5 | ▲0.3 |
| Tierschutzpartei | | | | | 647 | 0.4 | 0.0 |
| GRAUEN | | | | | 579 | 0.3 | ▲0.1 |
| Familie | | | | | 447 | 0.3 | ▲0.1 |
| REP | | | | | 221 | 0.1 | 0.0 |
| PBC | | | | | 190 | 0.1 | |
| BüSo | | | | | 37 | 0.0 | |
| From Now on... Democracy Through Referendum | | | | | 119 | 0.1 | |
| Centre | | | | | 73 | 0.0 | |
| Socialist Equality Party | | | | | 39 | 0.0 | |
| MLPD | | | | | 33 | 0.0 | 0.0 |
| Informal votes | | 1,385 | | | 2,040 | | |
| Total valid votes | | 170,421 | | | 170,766 | | |
| Turnout | | 172,806 | 81.3 | ▼1.8 | | | |
| SPD hold | Majority | 4,156 | 2.5 | | | | |

Bundestag
| New title | Constituency represented by the chancellor 1949-1963 | Succeeded by Ulm |
