= Limbach =

Limbach may refer to:

== Places ==
=== Austria ===
- Limbach (Burgenland), a village, see Hungarian exonyms (Burgenland)

=== Germany ===
- Limbach, Baden-Württemberg, a town in the district of Neckar-Odenwald-Kreis
- Limbach, Bad Kreuznach, a municipality in Rhineland-Palatinate
- Limbach (Kirkel), a quarter of Kirkel, Saarland
- Limbach, Westerwaldkreis, a municipality in Rhineland-Palatinate
- Limbach, Vogtland, a municipality in Saxony
- Limbach-Oberfrohna, a town in the district of Zwickau, Saxony

=== Slovakia ===
- Limbach, Slovakia, a municipality in Pezinok District, Bratislava Region

== Other ==
- Limbach Flugmotoren, German manufacturer of aircraft engines

== People ==
- Anna Limbach (born 1989), German sabre fencer
- Benjamin Limbach (born 1969), German politician
- Nicolas Limbach (born 1985), German fencer
- Thea Limbach (born 1959), Dutch speedskater
- Luise Limbach (1834–1909), German soprano
- Jutta Limbach (1934–2016), German politician
- Renate Limbach (1971–2006), Dutch chess master
- Editha Limbach (1933–2023), German politician
