= Simitis =

Simitis (Greek: Σημίτης) is a surname. Notable people with the surname include:

- Costas Simitis (1936–2025), Greek politician and Prime Minister of Greece
- Ilse Grubrich-Simitis (1936–2024), German psychoanalyst
- Spiros Simitis (1934–2023), Greek-German jurist
