= Olpe – Märkischer Kreis I =

Federal electoral district of Germany

148 Olpe – Märkischer Kreis I
- Electoral district for the Bundestag
- Olpe – Märkischer Kreis I in 2025
- State: North Rhine-Westphalia
- Population: 276,100 (2019)
- Electorate: 203,350 (2021)
- Major settlements: Lüdenscheid; Lennestadt; Olpe
- Area: 1,161.5 km^{2}

Current electoral district
- Created: 1980
- Party: CDU
- Member: Florian Müller
- Elected: 2021, 2025

Olpe – Märkischer Kreis I is an electoral constituency (German: Wahlkreis) represented in the Bundestag. It elects one member via first-past-the-post voting. Under the current constituency numbering system, it is designated as constituency 148. It is located in southern North Rhine-Westphalia, comprising the Olpe district and the southern part of the Märkischer Kreis district.

Olpe – Märkischer Kreis I was created for the 1980 federal election. Since 2021, it has been represented by Florian Müller of the Christian Democratic Union (CDU).

== Geography ==
Olpe – Märkischer Kreis I is located in southern North Rhine-Westphalia. As of the 2021 federal election, it comprises the entirety of the Olpe district and the municipalities of Halver, Herscheid, Kierspe, Lüdenscheid, Meinerzhagen, and Schalksmühle from the Märkischer Kreis district.

== History ==
Olpe – Märkischer Kreis I was created in 1980, then known as Olpe – Siegen-Wittgenstein II. It acquired its current name in the 2002 election. In the 1980 through 1998 elections, it was constituency 121 in the numbering system. From 2002 through 2009, it was number 150. In the 2013 through 2021 elections, it was number 149. From the 2025 election, it has been number 148.

Originally, the constituency comprised the Olpe district and the municipalities of Freudenberg, Hilchenbach, and Kreuztal from the Siegen-Wittgenstein district. It acquired its current borders in the 2002 election.

Election	No.	Name	Borders
1980	121	Olpe – Siegen-Wittgenstein II	Olpe district; Siegen-Wittgenstein district (only Freudenberg, Hilchenbach, and Kreuztal municipalities)
1983	121	Olpe – Siegen-Wittgenstein II	Olpe district; Siegen-Wittgenstein district (only Freudenberg, Hilchenbach, and Kreuztal municipalities)
1987	121	Olpe – Siegen-Wittgenstein II	Olpe district; Siegen-Wittgenstein district (only Freudenberg, Hilchenbach, and Kreuztal municipalities)
1990	121	Olpe – Siegen-Wittgenstein II	Olpe district; Siegen-Wittgenstein district (only Freudenberg, Hilchenbach, and Kreuztal municipalities)
1994	121	Olpe – Siegen-Wittgenstein II	Olpe district; Siegen-Wittgenstein district (only Freudenberg, Hilchenbach, and Kreuztal municipalities)
1998	121	Olpe – Siegen-Wittgenstein II	Olpe district; Siegen-Wittgenstein district (only Freudenberg, Hilchenbach, and Kreuztal municipalities)
2002	150	Olpe – Märkischer Kreis I	Olpe district; Märkischer Kreis district (only Halver, Herscheid, Kierspe, Lüdenscheid, Meinerzhagen, and Schalksmühle municipalities)
2005	150	Olpe – Märkischer Kreis I	Olpe district; Märkischer Kreis district (only Halver, Herscheid, Kierspe, Lüdenscheid, Meinerzhagen, and Schalksmühle municipalities)
2009	150	Olpe – Märkischer Kreis I	Olpe district; Märkischer Kreis district (only Halver, Herscheid, Kierspe, Lüdenscheid, Meinerzhagen, and Schalksmühle municipalities)
2013	149	Olpe – Märkischer Kreis I	Olpe district; Märkischer Kreis district (only Halver, Herscheid, Kierspe, Lüdenscheid, Meinerzhagen, and Schalksmühle municipalities)
2017	149	Olpe – Märkischer Kreis I	Olpe district; Märkischer Kreis district (only Halver, Herscheid, Kierspe, Lüdenscheid, Meinerzhagen, and Schalksmühle municipalities)
2021	149	Olpe – Märkischer Kreis I	Olpe district; Märkischer Kreis district (only Halver, Herscheid, Kierspe, Lüdenscheid, Meinerzhagen, and Schalksmühle municipalities)
2025	148	Olpe – Märkischer Kreis I	Olpe district; Märkischer Kreis district (only Halver, Herscheid, Kierspe, Lüdenscheid, Meinerzhagen, and Schalksmühle municipalities)

== Members ==
The constituency has been held by the Christian Democratic Union (CDU) since its creation. It was first represented by Willi Weiskirch from 1980 to 1987, followed by Joachim Grünewald from 1987 to 1994. Hartmut Schauerte became representative in 1994 and served until 2009. Matthias Heider was elected in 2009, and re-elected in 2013 and 2017. He was succeeded by Florian Müller in 2021, and re-elected in 2025.

Election	Member	Party	%
1980	Willi Weiskirch	CDU	54.8
1983	Willi Weiskirch	CDU	61.1
1987	Joachim Grünewald	CDU	57.0
1990	Joachim Grünewald	CDU	56.2
1994	Hartmut Schauerte	CDU	52.1
1998	Hartmut Schauerte	CDU	49.9
2002	Hartmut Schauerte	CDU	48.2
2005	Hartmut Schauerte	CDU	50.8
2009	Matthias Heider	CDU	47.4
2013	Matthias Heider	CDU	51.7
2017	Matthias Heider	CDU	47.9
2021	Florian Müller	CDU	37.1
2025	Florian Müller	CDU	42.1

== Election results ==
=== 2025 election ===
Federal election (2025): Olpe – Märkischer Kreis I
Notes:	Blue background denotes the winner of the electorate vote. Pink background denotes a candidate elected from their party list. Yellow background denotes an electorate win by a list member, or other incumbent. A ✓ or ✗ denotes status of any incumbent, win or lose respectively.						
Party	Candidate	Votes	%	±%	Party votes	%	±%
CDU	Florian Müller	68,241	42.1	▲5.1	63,117	38.9	▲6.1
SPD	Nezahat Baradari	33,640	20.8	▼8.8	26,688	16.4	▼11.1
AfD	Horst Karpinsky	32,358	20.0	▲11.4	33,289	20.5	▲12.0
Greens	Matthias Koch	10,191	6.3	▼2.6	11,717	7.2	▼2.7
Left	Otto Ersching	8,231	5.1	▲2.5	8,900	5.5	▲2.8
BSW					6,617	4.1	
FDP	Johannes Vogel	5,650	3.5	▼6.9	6,416	4.0	▼8.6
FW	Marion Linde	2,102	1.3	▼0.2	998	0.6	▼0.2
Tierschutzpartei					1,897	1.2	▼0.1
Independent	Axel Turck	1,519	0.9				
PARTEI					708	0.4	▼0.4
Volt					591	0.4	▲0.2
dieBasis				▼1.3	411	0.3	▼0.8
Team Todenhöfer					253	0.2	▼0.3
PdF					250	0.2	▲0.1
BD					243	0.1	
Values					133	0.1	
MERA25					46	0.0	
MLPD					33	0.0	0.0
Pirates							▼0.3
Bündnis C							▼0.3
ÖDP							▼0.2
Gesundheitsforschung							▼0.1
Humanists							▼0.1
SGP						0.0	0.0
Informal votes		1,410			1,035		
Total valid votes		161,932			162,307		
Turnout		163,342	82.4	▲6.2			
CDU hold	Majority	34,601	21.3				

=== 2021 election ===
Federal election (2021): Olpe – Märkischer Kreis I
Notes:	Blue background denotes the winner of the electorate vote. Pink background denotes a candidate elected from their party list. Yellow background denotes an electorate win by a list member, or other incumbent. A ✓ or ✗ denotes status of any incumbent, win or lose respectively.						
Party	Candidate	Votes	%	±%	Party votes	%	±%
CDU	Florian Müller	56,879	37.1	▼10.8	50,364	32.8	▼7.8
SPD	Nezahat Baradari	45,366	29.6	▲3.2	42,362	27.6	▲4.3
FDP	Johannes Vogel	15,944	10.4	▲1.6	19,227	12.5	▼1.2
Greens	Holger Thamm	13,645	8.9	▲5.5	15,243	9.9	▲5.4
AfD	Klaus Heger	13,104	8.5	▼0.3	13,100	8.5	▼0.6
Left	Otto Ersching	3,935	2.6	▼2.2	4,150	2.7	▼2.7
Tierschutzpartei					1,899	1.2	▲0.6
FW	Sabrina Dieckmann	2,269	1.5		1,251	0.8	▲0.6
dieBasis	Dagmar Welz	2,021	1.3		1,676	1.1	
PARTEI					1,213	0.8	▲0.2
Team Todenhöfer					691	0.4	
Pirates					511	0.3	▼0.1
Bündnis C					326	0.2	
Volt					278	0.2	
ÖDP					265	0.2	0.0
LIEBE					211	0.1	
Gesundheitsforschung					190	0.1	0.0
NPD					181	0.1	▼0.2
LfK					128	0.1	
Humanists					87	0.1	0.0
V-Partei3					78	0.1	0.0
du.					69	0.0	
DKP	Engelbert Prevorcic	221	0.1		60	0.0	0.0
PdF					46	0.0	
LKR					27	0.0	
MLPD					26	0.0	0.0
SGP					12	0.0	0.0
Informal votes		1,446			1,159		
Total valid votes		153,384			153,671		
Turnout		154,830	76.1	▲2.3			
CDU hold	Majority	11,513	7.5	▼14.0			

=== 2017 election ===
Federal election (2017): Olpe – Märkischer Kreis I
Notes:	Blue background denotes the winner of the electorate vote. Pink background denotes a candidate elected from their party list. Yellow background denotes an electorate win by a list member, or other incumbent. A ✓ or ✗ denotes status of any incumbent, win or lose respectively.						
Party	Candidate	Votes	%	±%	Party votes	%	±%
CDU	✓ Matthias Heider	72,158	47.9	▼3.8	61,394	40.6	▼7.4
SPD	Nezahat Baradari (Note: Baradari entered the Bundestag on the SPD list after the resignation of Ulrich Kelber in January 2019.)	39,699	26.3	▼6.4	35,269	23.3	▼4.9
AfD	Klaus Heger	13,306	8.8	▲6.2	13,847	9.2	▲5.0
FDP	Johannes Vogel	13,230	8.8	▲6.4	20,758	13.7	▲8.6
Left	Ingeborg Mohr-Simeonidis	7,197	4.8	▲1.0	8,205	5.4	▲0.6
Greens	Christian Hohn	5,170	3.4	0.0	6,866	4.5	▼0.6
Tierschutzpartei					975	0.6	
PARTEI					828	0.5	▲0.2
Pirates					631	0.4	▼1.4
AD-DEMOKRATEN					482	0.3	
NPD					417	0.3	▼0.8
FW					371	0.2	▼0.1
ÖDP					319	0.2	▲0.1
Gesundheitsforschung					151	0.1	
Volksabstimmung					140	0.1	▼0.1
DM					139	0.1	
DiB					128	0.1	
V-Partei³					127	0.1	
BGE					101	0.1	
Die Humanisten					61	0.0	
MLPD					40	0.0	0.0
DKP					27	0.0	
SGP					13	0.0	0.0
Informal votes		1,782			1,253		
Total valid votes		150,760			151,289		
Turnout		152,542	73.8	▲2.4			
CDU hold	Majority	32,459	21.6	▲2.6			

=== 2013 election ===
Federal election (2013): Olpe – Märkischer Kreis I
Notes:	Blue background denotes the winner of the electorate vote. Pink background denotes a candidate elected from their party list. Yellow background denotes an electorate win by a list member, or other incumbent. A ✓ or ✗ denotes status of any incumbent, win or lose respectively.						
Party	Candidate	Votes	%	±%	Party votes	%	±%
CDU	✓ Matthias Heider	76,911	51.7	▲4.3	71,437	48.0	▲8.2
SPD	Petra Crone	48,711	32.7	▲4.4	42,002	28.2	▲3.8
Left	Wolfgang Hoffmann	5,635	3.8	▼3.0	7,113	4.8	▼2.5
Greens	Kai Bitzer	5,132	3.4	▼2.2	7,726	5.2	▼1.8
AfD	Hasso Simon	3,931	2.6		6,151	4.1	
FDP	Johannes Vogel	3,586	2.4	▼8.0	7,694	5.2	▼11.6
Pirates	Bastian Halbe	2,694	1.8		2,708	1.8	▲0.5
NPD		1,692	1.1	▼0.2	1,574	1.1	0.0
FW		545	0.4		505	0.3	
PARTEI					488	0.3	
Volksabstimmung					312	0.2	▲0.1
PRO					275	0.2	
ÖDP					193	0.1	▲0.1
REP					188	0.1	▼0.2
Nichtwahler					134	0.1	
BIG					117	0.1	
Party of Reason					101	0.1	
RRP					84	0.1	▼0.1
PSG					44	0.0	0.0
BüSo					27	0.0	0.0
MLPD					22	0.0	0.0
Die Rechte					20	0.0	
Informal votes		1,632			1,554		
Total valid votes		148,837			148,915		
Turnout		150,469	71.4	▲0.8			
CDU hold	Majority	28,200	19.0	▼0.1			

=== 2009 election ===
Federal election (2009): Olpe – Märkischer Kreis I
Notes:	Blue background denotes the winner of the electorate vote. Pink background denotes a candidate elected from their party list. Yellow background denotes an electorate win by a list member, or other incumbent. A ✓ or ✗ denotes status of any incumbent, win or lose respectively.						
Party	Candidate	Votes	%	±%	Party votes	%	±%
CDU	Matthias Heider	70,705	47.4	▼3.4	59,358	39.7	▼2.9
SPD	Petra Crone	42,273	28.3	▼9.3	36,470	24.4	▼9.9
FDP	Johannes Vogel	15,568	10.4	▲6.6	25,021	16.7	▲6.0
Left	Josef Filippek	10,100	6.8	▲3.0	10,797	7.2	▲2.8
Greens	Christian Röner	8,476	5.7	▲2.8	10,379	6.9	▲2.0
Pirates					1,901	1.3	
NPD	Stephan Haase	2,064	1.4	▲0.3	1,564	1.0	▲0.2
Tierschutzpartei					978	0.7	▲0.2
FAMILIE					879	0.6	▲0.2
RENTNER					673	0.5	
REP					503	0.3	▼0.2
RRP					281	0.2	
Volksabstimmung					151	0.1	0.0
DVU					119	0.1	
Centre					115	0.1	0.0
ÖDP					108	0.1	
MLPD					40	0.0	0.0
PSG					37	0.0	0.0
BüSo					20	0.0	0.0
Informal votes		1,941			1,733		
Total valid votes		149,186			149,394		
Turnout		151,127	70.6	▼6.8			
CDU hold	Majority	28,432	19.1	▲5.9			

=== 2005 election ===
Federal election (2005): Olpe – Märkischer Kreis I
Notes:	Blue background denotes the winner of the electorate vote. Pink background denotes a candidate elected from their party list. Yellow background denotes an electorate win by a list member, or other incumbent. A ✓ or ✗ denotes status of any incumbent, win or lose respectively.						
Party	Candidate	Votes	%	±%	Party votes	%	±%
CDU	✓ Harmut Schauerte	83,289	50.8	▲2.6	70,002	42.6	▼1.5
SPD	Uwe Beul	61,628	37.6	▼2.4	56,319	34.3	▼2.8
FDP	Armin Jung	6,322	3.9	▼2.6	17,658	10.8	▲1.5
Left	Josef Filippek	6,198	3.8	▲2.8	7,210	4.4	▲3.5
Greens	Fred Hansen	4,665	2.8	▼0.9	8,047	4.9	▼1.2
NPD	Stephan Haase	1,823	1.1		1,414	0.9	▲0.6
REP					805	0.5	▲0.1
Tierschutzpartei					774	0.5	▲0.1
Familie					700	0.4	▲0.2
GRAUEN					441	0.3	▲0.1
PBC					402	0.2	
From Now on... Democracy Through Referendum					210	0.1	
Centre					61	0.0	
MLPD					60	0.0	
Socialist Equality Party					65	0.0	
BüSo					25	0.0	0.0
Informal votes		2,464			2,196		
Total valid votes		163,925			164,193		
Turnout		166,389	77.4	▼2.3			
CDU hold	Majority	21,661	13.2				
