= Andrea Voßhoff =

German lawyer and politician

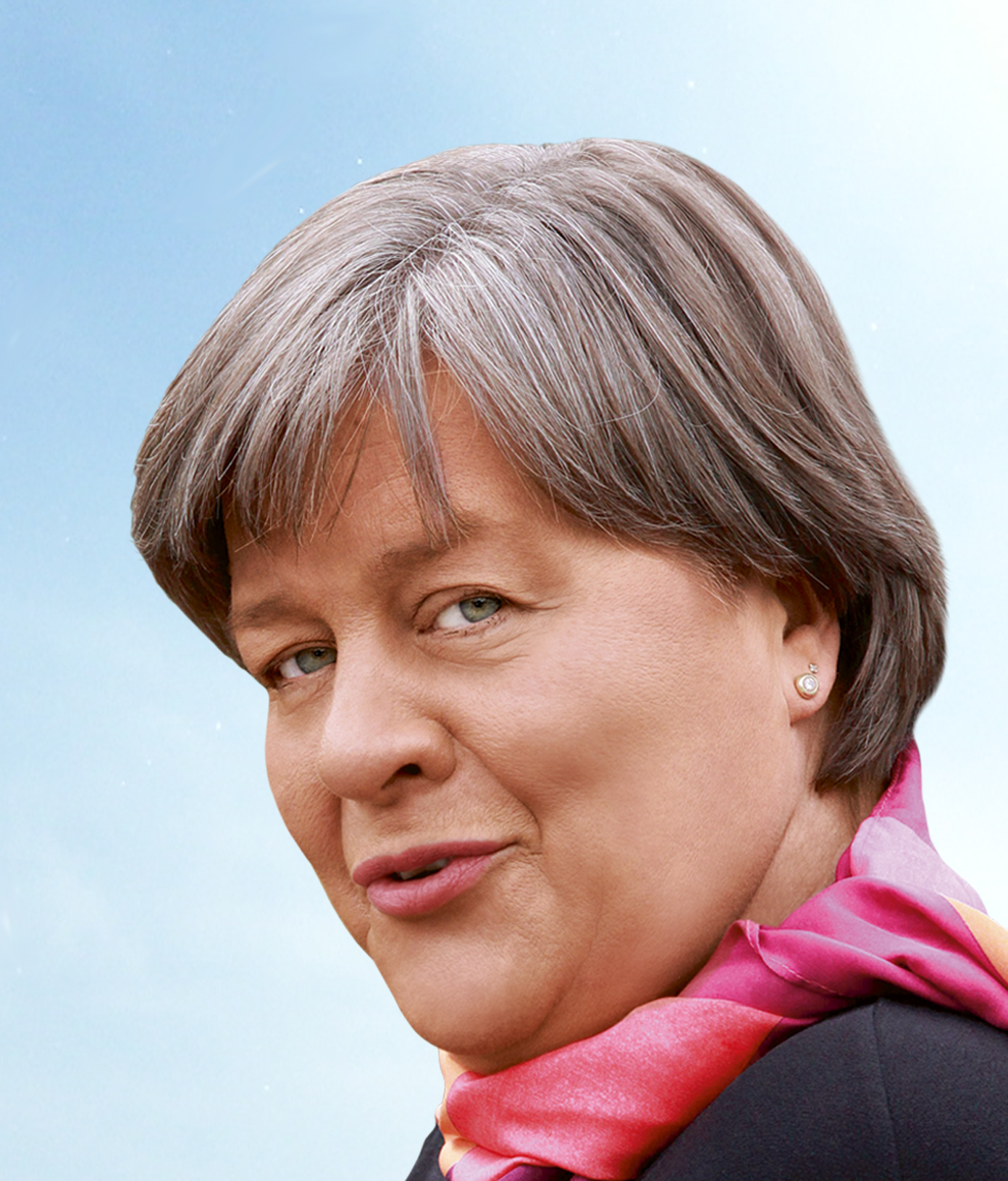
- Andrea in 2009

Federal Commissioner for Data Protection and Freedom of Information
- In office 4 February 2014 – 7 January 2019
- Preceded by: Peter Schaar
- Succeeded by: Ulrich Kelber

Personal details
- Born: Andrea Astrid Voßhoff; 31 July 1958 (age 68) Haren, Emsland, Lower Saxony, West Germany
- Party: CDU
- Spouse: Peter-Michael Voßhoff
- Occupation: Lawyer-notary-office manager; Local politician; National politician

Andrea Astrid Voßhoff (born 31 July 1958) is a German former lawyer who switched to full-time politics in mid-career (CDU). She served as a member of the Bundestag between 1998 and 2013 when, as a "party list" candidate, she narrowly failed to secure re-election in the Brandenburg-Potsam electoral district.

At the end of 2013, it was announced that Voßhoff was appointed to serve as Germany's data protection commissioner in succession to Peter Schaar, with effect from 6 January 2014. The appointment drew widespread criticism from those who saw it as a consolation prize for a politician who had served her party loyally in the Bundestag for fifteen years. Opponents pointed to a parliamentary voting record that showed no great affection for the right to personal privacy. She had, indeed, supported a number of controversial proposals and pieces of government legislation in respect of matters such as data retention, online data access involving (in particular) child abuse, government access to citizen's computers using undisclosed spying software and the Anti-Counterfeiting Trade Agreement. She nevertheless served out a full five-year term as national data protection commissioner: while the criticism was not completely stilled, notably in respect of her alleged failure to give data protection issues a more prominent public profile, there were those who paid tribute to a succession of robust and legally sound data protection judgements handed down during her incumbency, and the expansion of the data-protection office under her watch.

== Life and career ==
=== Provenance and early years ===
Voßhoff was born into a family of waterways workers in the little town of Haren in northern Germany, close to the Dutch border. The area in which she was born was traditionally Protestant, but slightly more than a decade before her birth, through a combination of industrial scale ethnic cleansing and various local factors, the region had, like much of western Germany, become more evenly balanced in respect of the Protestant-Catholic mix. Voßhoff herself is registered as a Roman Catholic.

She attended secondary school in Meppen, passing the "Abitur" (school final exams) in 1977, which opened the way to university-level education. Between 1977 and 1979 she studied Jurisprudence at the University of Münster. This was followed by a year as a foreign (non-Swiss) student at the University of Lausanne. After that she went on to work as a lawyer, initially as a trainee and later as a notary. She passed her Level 1 and Level 2 national law exams in 1984 and 1987. She was now qualified to work as a fully qualified lawyer in her own practice, which she did between 1988 and 1991.

By 1991 she had acquired a husband. That year the two of them relocated to Rathenow, a small town a short distance to the west of Berlin. Peter-Michael Voßhoff also has a legal background. In Rathenow he opened a Notary's office. Andrea Voßhoff was employed as his office manager between 1991 and 1998. The marriage remained childless.

=== CDU ===
Voßhoff had been not quite 30 in 1986, when she joined a political party. She joined the centre-right "Christian Democratic Union" (CDU) which at that time, under the leadership of Dr. Helmut Kohl, was the larger of the two parties sharing power in Germany's governing coalition. Between 1997 and 2007 she served as deputy chair for the local party in Havelland. Between 1999 and 2005 she was also deputy CDU party chair in the entire state of Brandenburg, which had been reinstated in October 1990 as part of the overall reunification process.

Between 1996 and 2000 she was, in addition, chair of the Brandenburg section of the party's "Mittelstands- und Wirtschaftsunion" (MIT), a highly influential organisation representing the interests of "Mittelstand" entrepreneurs, the self-employed and freelancers within the party, dedicated both to eulogising the free-market liberalism attributed to the "Wirtschaftswunder chancellor", Ludwig Erhard, and to advancing the current agenda of members within the party.

=== Stadtverordnetenversammlung ===
Between 2003 and 2013, Voßhoff was a member of the "Stadtverordnetenversammlung" (town council) of Rathenow. She was a member of the council committee for finance and budgeting which, from November 2003, she chaired. Between 2008 and 2010 she was also a member of the Havelland district council.

=== Bundestag (National Parliament) ===
In 1998, Voßhoff was elected for the first time to the Bundestag (the directly elected "lower" house of Germany's bicameral parliament) as a member for electoral district 275, corresponding to a region in the western part of the state of Brandenburg. The party put her name forward for direct election: she was also included as a list candidate, in position 2 on the party's list for the state of Brandenburg. Electoral district 275 was traditionally one in which the SPD candidate tended to come first, and it was only as a list candidate that Voßhoff secured her own election. As a Bundestag member, she was appointed by the party to serve on the Bundestag Law Committee between 1998 and 2013. On 20 April 2010 the party leadership in the Bundestag appointed Voßhoff to serve as party spokesperson on legal matters and chair of the party's "Law Working Group". She was also one of the twelve members of the Bundestag "Wahlausschuss" (Committee), which at that time was empowered to appoint directly half of the judges on Germany's Supreme Constitutionality Court.

At the 2013 general election Voßhoff fell victim, at least in part, to her party's electoral success. As before, she stood for election in the Brandenburg-Potsam electoral district both as a direct candidate and as a list candidate. As in 2009, her SPD opponent for direct election was Frank-Walter Steinmeier, a locally popular centrist member of his party with a longstanding national profile as a former (and, as matters turned out, future) German Minister for Foreign Affairs. Although Steinmeier's winning margin was a narrow one, reflecting national trends, he nevertheless outpolled Voßhoff. Elsewhere in the Brandenburg, there were so many CDU candidates who secured direct election to the Bundestag, that the appropriate vote share was already achieved without the need for recourse to any CDU list candidate. As the candidate at the top of the CDU party list for Brandenburg, Voßhoff retained the status of "first-reserve" candidate, but in September 2013, after the calculations had been completed, there was no longer a Bundestag seat allocated to her. The situation was one which had not been anticipated.

=== Commissioner for Data Protection and Information Freedom ===
On 19 December 2013, a Bundestag vote confirmed Voßhoff's appointment as Federal Commissioner for Data Protection and Freedom of Information in succession to Peter Schaar whose retirement had taken effect, formally, three days earlier, following a ten-year incumbency. Voßhoff was installed in her new role by Interior Minister Thomas de Maizière on 4 February 2014.

The appointment was criticised by the powerful (in Germany) data protection lobby. As a member of the Bundestag between 1998 and 2013 Voßhoff had voted in support of several contentious pieces of government legislation in respect of matters such as data retention, online data access involving (in particular) child abuse, government access to citizen's computers using undisclosed spying software and the Anti-Counterfeiting Trade Agreement. More generally ventilated was a suspicion that Voßhoff had been given the job as a consolation prize following her unexpected failure to secure re-election to the Bundestag because of an unforeseen quirk in the psephological arithmetic. At the end of her first 100 days in post the media verdict was, on balance, negative. Writing a little more than nine months after her installation, Constanze Kurz, on behalf of the Chaos Computer Club, was already prepared to describe Voßhoff's first year in office as "a disaster". In a new era of mass-surveillance the Data Protection Commissioner was, for the most part, nowhere to be seen. Such interventions as she had made were timid bordering on apologetic.

In 2016 Andre Meister felt able to provide a less one-sided assessment: "This critique [which the Data Protection Protectioner had just authored, and which had then been leaked] could hardly be clearer. The otherwise rather insipid Andrea Voßhoff gives the intelligence services and the chancellry one legal ear-bashing after another". Two years after that, however, reflecting on the ending of Voßhoff's five year term, Kurz remained robustly unimpressed: "Data Protection and Information Freedom both require a return to a much stronger public profile".

Critics and supporters alike could agree on the way in which data protection challenges grew during the first part of the twenty-first century. In the course of Voßhoff's five year incumbency the number of people working at the Data Protection Commisariat more than doubled.

Between 2014 and 2018 Voßhoff was a member of the German government's - thus far largely inconsequential - Data Ethics Commission.

Voßhoff's term as data protection commissioner ended at the beginning of 2019. In a review of Voßhoff's term, Constanze Kurz renewed her criticism on netzpolitik.org, attesting to the outgoing federal data protection commissioner's lack of visibility in public debates, even though events relevant to data protection law, such as the entry into force of the DSGVO or the controversy over the state Trojan, fell during Voßhoff's term. His successor is SPD politician Ulrich Kelber.
