= Louisa Specht-Riemenschneider =

German professor and commissioner (born 1985)

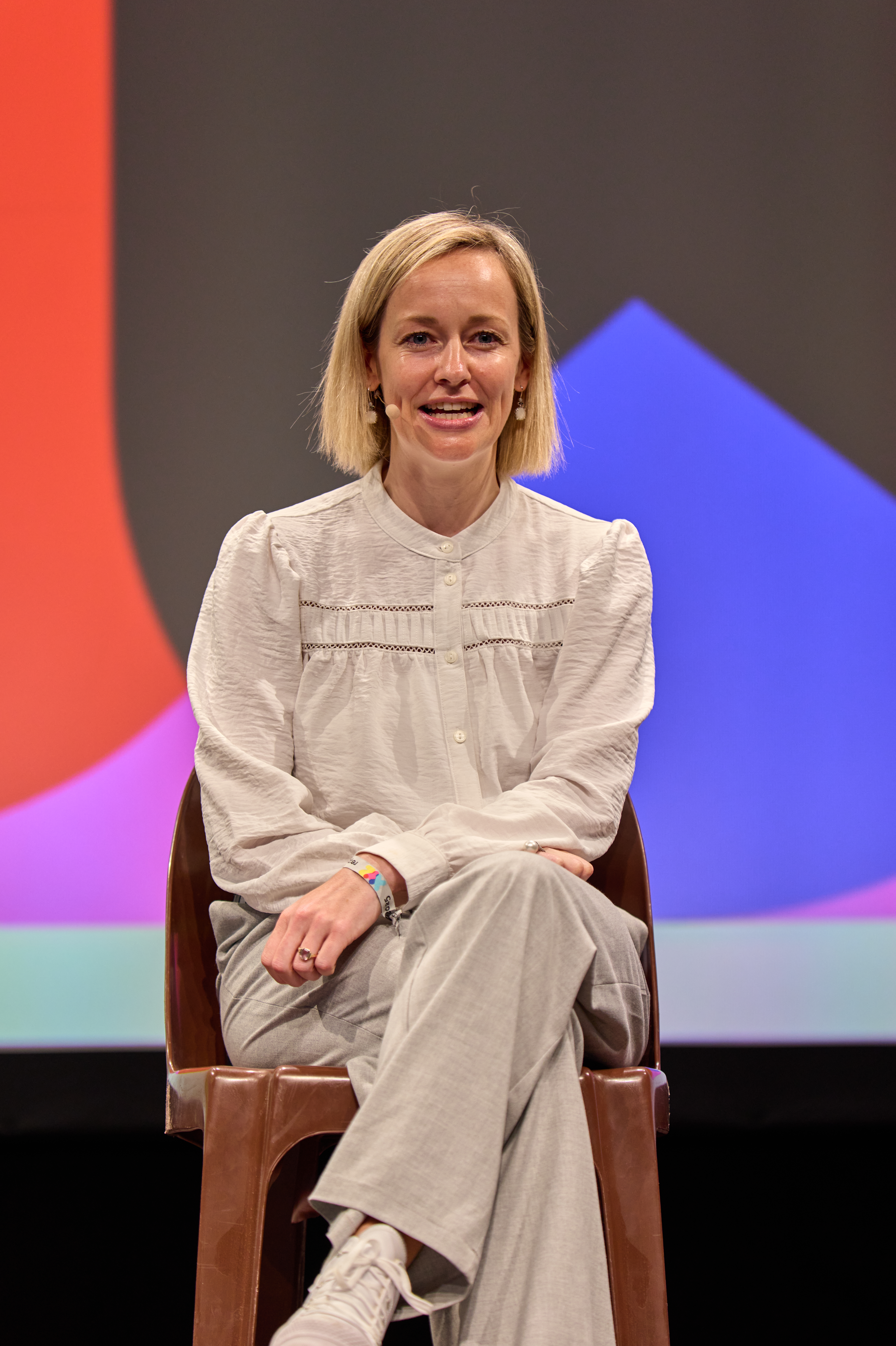
- Louisa in 2025

Federal Commissioner for Data Protection and Freedom of Information
- In office May 16, 2024 – March 2026
- Preceded by: Ulrich Kelber
- Succeeded by: Moritz Hennemann

Personal details
- Citizenship: Germany
- Education: University of Bremen

Louisa Specht-Riemenschneider (born 1985) is a German professor who served as the Federal Commissioner for Data Protection and Freedom of Information from 2024 to 2026.

== Education ==
Specht-Riemenschneider studied law at the University of Bremen in Bremen, and graduated with a doctorate in 2011. She received the Science Award from the German Foundation for Law and Informatics for her work at the University of Freiburg.

== Career ==
Specht-Riemenschneider was elected as the Chair of Civil Law, Data Economy Law, Data Protection, Digitalisation and Artificial Intelligence at the University of Bonn in 2018.

In May 2024, Specht-Riemenschneider was elected as the Federal Commissioner for Data Protection and Freedom of Information, succeeding Ulrich Kelber. In March 2026, she announced her resignation, citing health reasons.
