= Nezahat Baradari =

German politician

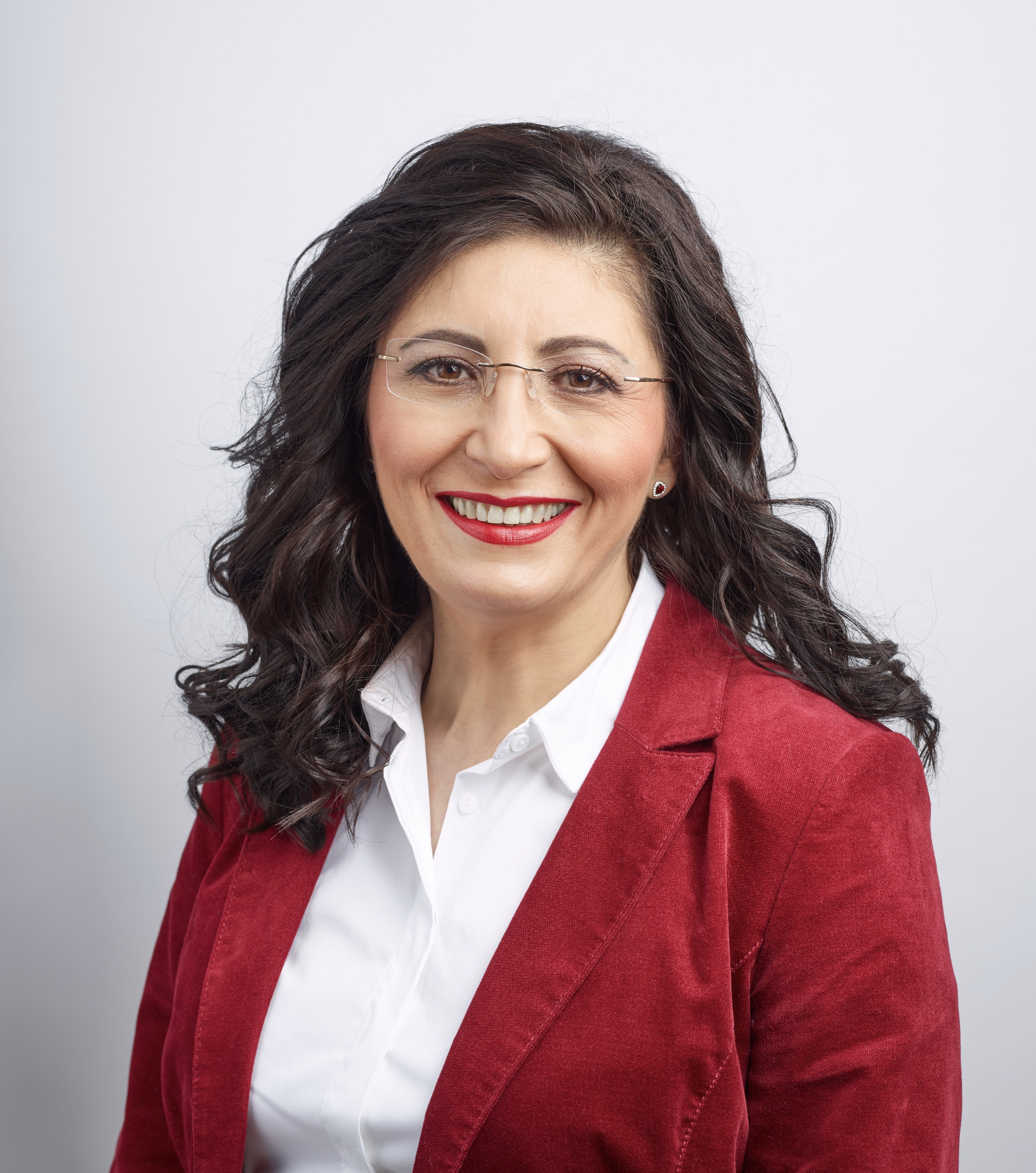
- Baradari in 2017

Member of the Bundestag
- Incumbent
- Assumed office 2019
- Preceded by: Ulrich Kelber
- Constituency: Bonn

Personal details
- Born: 15 August 1965 (age 61) Ankara, Turkey
- Party: SPD
- Education: University of Kiel

Nezahat Baradari (born 15 August 1965) is a German physician and politician of the Social Democratic Party (SPD) who has been serving as a member of the Bundestag from the state of North Rhine-Westphalia since 2019.

== Early life and career ==
Born in Ankara into a family of Turkish origin, Baradari graduated from a German high school in 1987. From 1987 to 1994 she studied medicine at the University of Kiel. She completed her studies with the III. state examination. She received her license to practice medicine in October 1997. In October 2003, she received her specialist's licence to practise paediatrics and adolescent medicine.

== Political career ==
Baradari has been a member of the Bundestag since 2019, when she succeeded Ulrich Kelber who had resigned. In parliament, she is a member of the Committee on European Affairs (since 2019) and the Committee on Food and Agriculture (since 2020). On the Committee on European Affairs, she has been her parliamentary group’s rapporteur on research and innovation.

In addition to her committee assignments, Baradari has been part of the German delegation to the Parliamentary Assembly of the Mediterranean since 2020.

== Controversy ==
Nezahat Baradari made critical comments on the German Bundestag's Armenian Genocide recognition in an SPD WhatsApp chat in 2016. This sparked controversy among SPD officials in Sauerland.

Baradari believes that the Armenian Genocide consisted of "Armenian uprisings" as well as "mutual killings, massacres as well as deportations" that require "an in-depth scientific as well as independent investigation". In her critique, Baradari also referred to statements made by the federal chairman of the Turkish Community in Germany (TGD), Gökay Sofuoglu, who said that the decision to adopt the Armenian Genocide resolution disregards "the opinion of ethnic Turks in Germany," the majority of whom oppose the resolution."

== Other activities ==
- Business Forum of the Social Democratic Party of Germany, Member of the Political Advisory Board (since 2022)
- IG Metall, Member
- Médecins Sans Frontières (MSF), Member
