= Ulrich Kelber =

German politician (born 1968)

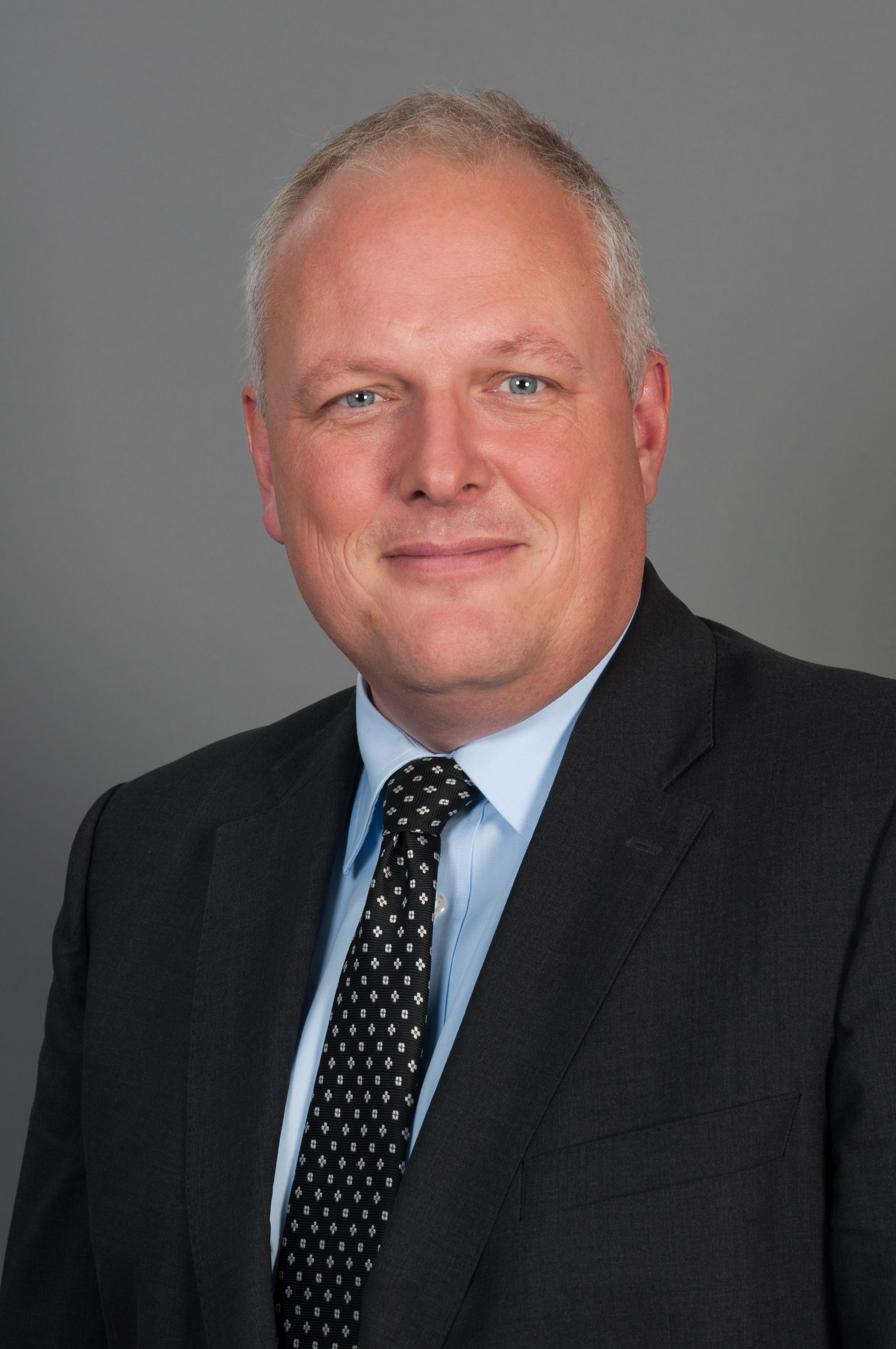
- Ulrich Kelber in 2014

Federal Commissioner for Data Protection and Freedom of Information
- In office 7 January 2019 – 16 May 2024
- Preceded by: Andrea Voßhoff
- Succeeded by: Louisa Specht-Riemenschneider

Member of the Bundestag for Bonn
- In office 1 September 2000 – 6 January 2019
- Succeeded by: Nezahat Baradari

Personal details
- Born: 29 March 1968 (age 58) Bamberg
- Party: SPD
- Education: University of Bonn

Ulrich Wolfgang Kelber (born 29 March 1968) is a German former politician of the Social Democratic Party (SPD) who served as the Federal Commissioner for Data Protection and Freedom of Information from 2019 to 2024. From 2000 to 2019, he was the member of the Bundestag for Bonn.

== Life ==
Ulrich Kelber was born in Bamberg and grew up in Bonn. From 1987 to 1993 he studied computer science and biology at the University of Bonn. He worked in IT until 2002.

== Political career ==
=== Career in local politics ===
Kelber became a member of the SPD in 1985 and was the local party chairman in Bonn from 2001 to 2008, and a member of the SPD executive board 2009 to 2011.

=== Member of the German Parliament, 2000–2019 ===
Kelber became a member of the Bundestag on 1 September 2000, replacing Rudolf Dreßler who left. He won re-election as directly elected member for the constituency of Bonn in each of the elections from 2002 to 2017.

In parliament, Kelber was a member of the Committee on the Environment, Nature Conservation and Nuclear Safety from 2000 until 2005, where he served as the SPD parliamentary group's rapporteur on the European Union Emission Trading Scheme (EU ETS). From 2005 until 2013, he served as the group's deputy chairman under the leadership of successive chairmen Peter Struck (2005-2009) and Frank-Walter Steinmeier (2009-2013). In this capacity, he coordinated the group's policy initiatives on the environment, energy, sustainability, agriculture and consumer protection.

In the negotiations to form a Grand Coalition of the Christian Democrats (CDU together with the Bavarian CSU) and the SPD following the 2013 elections, Kelber was part of the SPD delegation in the working group on the environment and agriculture, led by Katherina Reiche and Ute Vogt. In the coalition government of Chancellor Angela Merkel, he subsequently served as Parliamentary State Secretary at the Federal Ministry of Justice and Consumer Protection under the leadership of minister Heiko Maas from 2014 until 2018.

In the negotiations to form a fourth coalition government under Merkel's leadership following the 2017 federal elections, Kelber was part of the working group on internal and legal affairs, led by Thomas de Maizière, Stephan Mayer and Heiko Maas.

=== Federal Commissioner for Data Protection and Freedom of Information, 2019–2024 ===
Kelber was elected to become Federal Commissioner for Data Protection and Freedom of Information in 2018 and took up the office on 7 January 2019 after giving up his Bundestag seat. In 2024, he was succeeded by Louisa Specht-Riemenschneider.

== Other activities ==
- Eurosolar, Member
- German Cyclist's Association (ADFC), Member
- Bonn International Award for Democracy, Member of the Board of Trustees
- German Federation for the Environment and Nature Conservation (BUND), Member
- German United Services Trade Union (ver.di), Member
- Greenpeace, Member
- Development and Peace Foundation (SEF), Member of the Board of Trustees (2018- 2019)
- Federal Network Agency for Electricity, Gas, Telecommunications, Post and Railway (BNetzA), Member of the Advisory Board (2005-2010)
