= Hans Peter Bull =

German politician (born 1936)

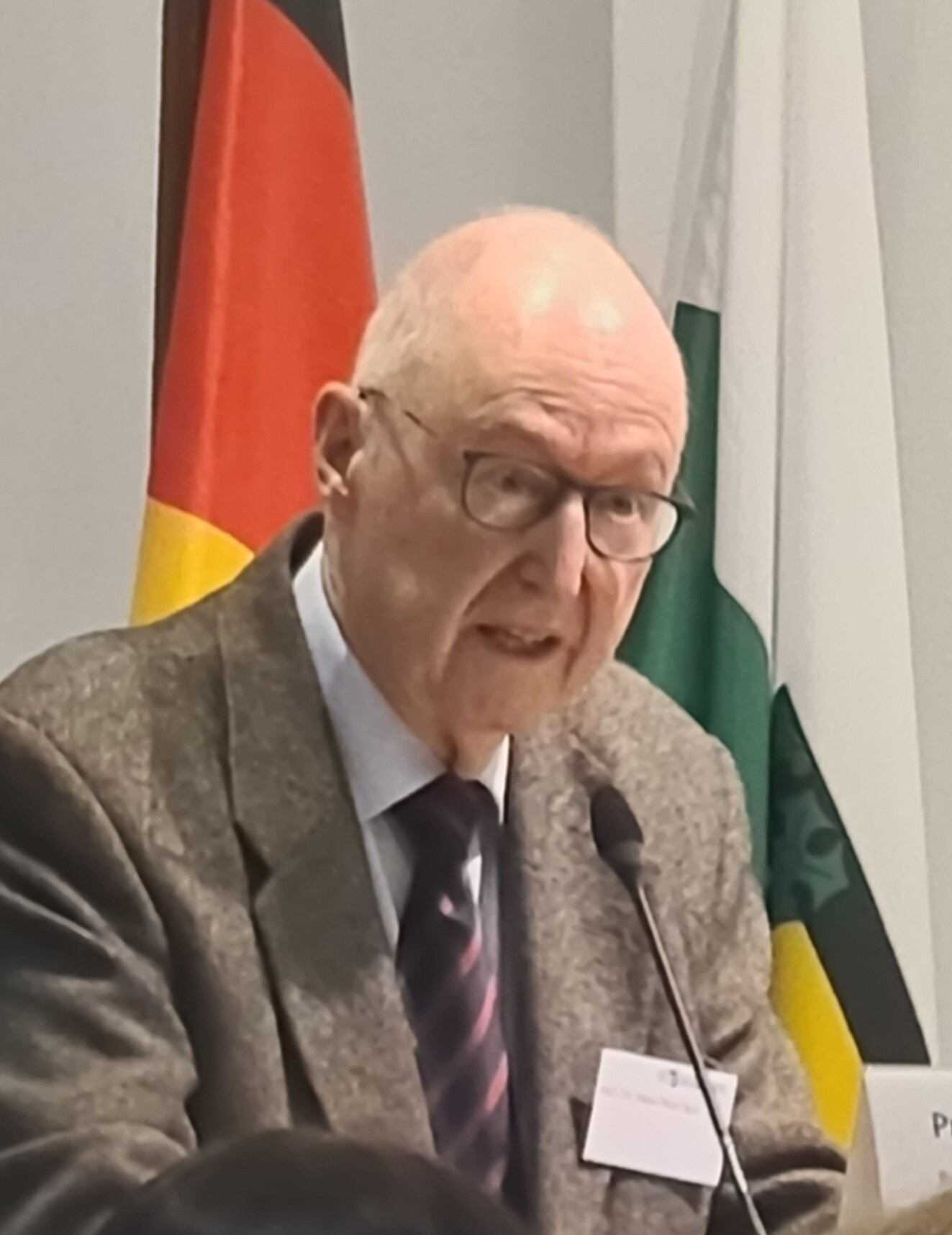

Federal Commissioner for Data Protection
- In office February 14, 1978 – May 16, 1983
- Appointed by: Bundestag
- Succeeded by: Reinhold Baumann

Schleswig-Holstein Minister of the Interior
- In office May 31, 1988 – January 24, 1995
- Appointed by: Björn Engholm, Heide Simonis

Personal details
- Born: 17 October 1936 (age 89) Lübben, Nazi Germany
- Party: Sozialdemokratische Partei Deutschlands Social Democratic Party of Germany
- Education: University of Hamburg, University of Marburg, Free University of Berlin

Hans Peter Bull (born 17 October 1936) is a German constitutional lawyer and jurist. He served between 1978 and 1985 as West Germany's first Federal Commissioner for Data Protection. It was widely believed that he was appointed at the eleventh hour only after the anticipated appointee, Spiros Simitis, had turned the job down because previously agreed levels of resourcing were dramatically cut at the last minute. Bull took on the job in an atmosphere of continuing scepticism over the levels of government commitment to data protection and Information Technology legislation more generally.

== Biography ==
Bull was born at Lübben (Spreewald), a small town in the marshy countryside to the south of Berlin. Hans-Joachim Bull (1906–1977), his father, was a lawyer and a judge whom Bull has described (in print) as "a self-confident choleric man with rigid principles, most of which dated back to the days of the kaiser...". The family - Hans Peter Bull, his two-year-old sister, the parents and his grandmother - fled Lübben on 19 April 1945 as the Red army advanced from the east. Under Soviet Military Administration they were obliged to return to their point of departure, but two years later they made a successful escape attempt, now exchanging life in the Soviet occupation zone for the British occupation zone. By 1947 they had ended up in Hamburg which is where Bull attended secondary school. After successfully completing his school career he had difficulty deciding whether he should pursue a career in journalism or in the law. In the end he opted for the law, although he continued to be actively involved in journalism as well. Between 1956 and 1960 he studied Jurisprudence at Hamburg, Marburg and at the Free University of Berlin. He also spent some time as an intern with Die Zeit, a weekly national newspaper published in Hamburg. He received his doctorate of law in 1963 for a piece of work concerned with "Verwaltung durch Maschinen. Rechtsprobleme der Technisierung der Verwaltung" ("Administration using machines. Legal problems with the mechanisation of administration"). Data protection challenges obsessed him long before the subject became mainstream. In 1966 he passed his level 2 national law exams, which in principle opened the way to a career as a lawyer. Then, in 1972, Bull received his habilitation, a higher level academic qualification generally seen as a necessary prerequisite for a lifetime career as a university academic in Germany.

Bull joined the Social Democratic Party ("Sozialdemokratische Partei Deutschlands" / SPD) in 1967. That was the year in which he took over as chairman of the Regional Arbitration Commission ("Landesschiedskommission") in Hamburg. He worked between 1973 and 1978 as a professor in Public Law at the University of Hamburg. Then, in 1978, he was offered and accepted a position as West Germany's first Federal Commissioner for Data Protection. Many of the concerns underlying the appointment were little understood by the political establishment, and during the next seven years Hans Peter Bull, whose own views were already thought through, did much to shape a role which over the next years provided a template for other European countries needing to find way to address abusive use of computer databases. Between 1983 and 1988 he resumed his work as professor in Public Law at Hamburg. Then, in 1988, he was appointed Minister of the Interior in the SPD regional government of Schleswig-Holstein, a position he retained till resigning at the start of 1995. He then returned again to his academic role at the university, from which he retired in 2002.

He served between 1997 and 2003 as a deputy chairman of the SPD's National Arbitration Copmmission ("Bundesschiedskommission"). He is also a member of the Hamburg-based Working Circle of Social Democratic Jurists ("Arbeitsgemeinschaft sozialdemokratischer Juristinnen und Juristen" / AsJ).

== Evaluation ==
In comparison with subsequent generations of Data Protection commissioners and officers, Bull's approach can be seen as relatively moderate, which may reflect his own later seven-year stint as an Interior Minister. He does not see Data Protection as a goal for its own sake, but rather as a counterweight and corrective against improper processing and use of data. He rejects what he would see as a more extensive data protection regime advocated by Spiros Simitis, Helmut Bäumler and Thilo Weichert, which he characterises as paternalism and infantilising of the citizenry. Bull stands instead for the status of the individual as a socially engaged being and stresses the need for a "socially adequate" information flow.
