= Florian Müller (politician) =

German politician

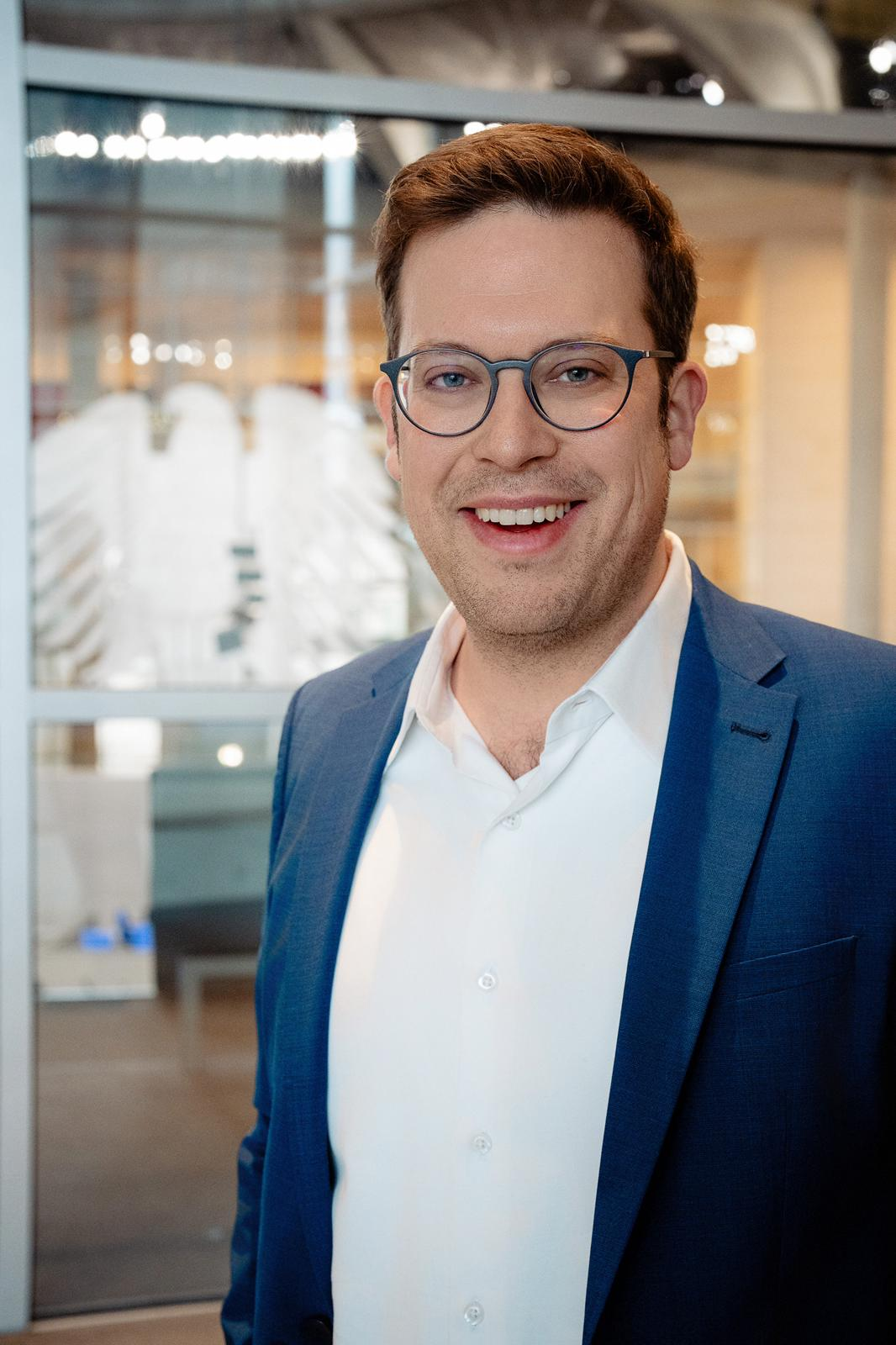

Member of the Bundestag
- Incumbent
- Assumed office 2021

Personal details
- Born: 14 September 1987 (age 38) Attendorn
- Party: CDU

Florian Müller (born 14 September 1987 in Attendorn) is a German politician of the Christian Democratic Union (CDU) who has been serving as a member of the Bundestag since the 2021 elections, representing the Olpe – Märkischer Kreis I electoral district.

== Early career ==
From 2019 to 2021, Müller worked at Lufthansa in Cologne.

== Political career ==
Since 2023, Müller has been part of the CDU's leadership team in North Rhine-Westphalia, under chairman Hendrik Wüst.

In parliament, Müller has been serving on the Committee on Research, Technology and Space. Since 2025, he has been his parliamentary group's spokesperson on research, technology and space.
