= Spiros Simitis =

Greek-German jurist (1934–2023)

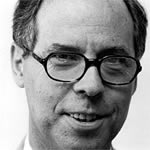
- Born: Σπύρος Σημίτης; 19 October 1934; Athens, Greece
- Died: 18 March 2023 (aged 88); Königstein im Taunus, Hesse, Germany
- Education: University of Marburg; Goethe University Frankfurt
- Occupations: University professor specialising in Data Protection; Data Protection commissioner
- Spouse: Ilse Grubrich-Simitis
- Relatives: Costas Simitis (brother)

Spiros Simitis (Greek: Σπύρος Σημίτης; 19 October 1934 – 18 March 2023) was a Greek-German jurist and a pioneer in the field of data protection. In recognition of his role, admirers sometimes describe him as "the man who invented data protection".

He was appointed Chief Data Protection Commissioner for the state of Hessen in 1975, and remained in post till 1991. When the West German government prepared for the 1978 launch of a national equivalent, he was seen by commentators as the obvious choice for the post of Federal Commissioner for Data Protection. He was indeed offered the job, but he rejected it in protest against the government decision, taken shortly before launch, to cut the resources allocated to the new department. That involved reducing the staffing level at the new commission from 32 – "previously agreed as necessary" – to 20. "The state of Bavaria on its own is budgeting no fewer than twenty data-protection staff for the coming year – a telling comparison" ("Allein das Land Bayern sehe für Datenschutz-Aufgaben in seinem eigenen Bereich im kommenden Jahr nicht weniger als zwanzig Bedienstete vor – eine "bezeichnende Relation"").

Spiros Simitis obtained West German citizenship in 1975. His younger brother, Costas Simitis, served as Prime Minister of Greece and was leader of the Panhellenic Socialist Movement (PASOK) between 1996 and 2004.

== Biography ==
Spiros Simitis was born in Athens to Fani and Georgios Simitis, a lawyer and law professor who later became a member of the National Liberation Front government in World War II. He completed his schooling in Athens. Directly after that, with his brother Costas Simitis, he moved to West Germany for university-level education in law. The brothers studied at the University of Marburg, where between 1952 and 1956 Spiros Simitis worked for his degree and doctorate in jurisprudence. He received his doctorate for work completed in 1956 on "Actual contractual relationships as an expression of the changing social purpose of legal principals in civil law" ("Die faktischen Vertragsverhältnisse als Ausdruck der gewandelten sozialen Funktion der Rechtsinstitute des Privatrechts"). He then moved a short distance south, to Frankfurt University, where he worked as a research assistant till 1962/63. His ambition was to make his career in the universities sector: accordingly, in 1963 he received his habilitation at Frankfurt. His dissertation was entitled (loosely translated), "The significance of the welfare state principle in family and company law" ("Der Sozialstaatgrundsatz in seiner Bedeutung fuer das Recht von Familie und Unternehmen"). Although the risks associated with unregulated accumulation by public bodies of vast quantities of personal data were already appearing on the horizon among academics familiar with developments in database technology, his habilitation was not concerned with Data Protection, the speciality which by the end of the 1960s had become the focus of his work.

Around the time he submitted his dissertation Simitis met the Freudian psychoanalyst-scholar Ilse Grubrich at the home of their friend, the sociologist-philosopher Jürgen Habermas and his wife Ute. The wedding ceremony for Spiros and Ilse Simitis took place on 3 August 1963, following the Greek Orthodox rite which on this occasion, as one impressed academic colleague noted, involved "dancing around the bride and groom with floral wreaths".

His next move was to the recently reinstated Law Faculty at the nearby University of Giessen, where between 1964 and 1969 he was employed as a full professor in Private law and Interjurisdictional Private law, along with Trade and Commercial law. Returning to Frankfurt in 1969, he took a professorship in Labour law, Civil law and Legal informatics, with a particular focus on Data Protection. Simitis was director of the Research Centre for Data Protection at Frankfurt University and has been a guest professor at the University of California, Berkeley (1976), Strasbourg University (1987–1988) and Yale University (1981–2000).

Spiros Simitis authored the Data Protection Act for the state of Hessen which came into force in its original form on 13 October 1970 and is widely seen as the world's first statute on data protection. It was from the start, in his words, a "reaction to the constant refinement and evolution of Information Technology" (als "Reaktion auf eine sich ständig weiterentwickelnde und verfeinernde Informationstechnologie"). In 1975 he took German citizenship, and this opened the way for him to take over as Chief Data Protection Commissioner for the state of Hessen in succession to Willi Birkelbach, although sources make clear that in reality his was the defining contribution from the establishment of the department in 1970.

At the start of 1978 the West German government launched the Federal Commissioner for Data Protection and Freedom of Information (Bundesbeauftragter für den Datenschutz / BfD), a nationwide version of the Data Protection Commission that had operated in Hessen since the start of the decade, and closely modeled on it. As the man who had designed the Hessen Data Protection Commission, Spiros Simitis was seen as an obvious candidate to head up the national version of it. The job was indeed offered to him by Interior Minister Werner Maihofer. Simitis and Maihofer discussed plans for the new commission in some detail and agreed to an initial headcount of 32 for it. In November 1977 it emerged that Simitis had turned down the post, however, and cabinet minutes indicated that the government had agreed to a headcount level of only 20. Simitis had refused the job because proper resourcing for the national Data Protection Commission, as previously agreed, would not be forthcoming. The legislation for the creation of the national Data Protection Commissioner had specified that the identity of the country's first head of Data Protection would be determined by July 1977. With the post still unfilled in November 1977, commentators inferred a lack of commitment to data protection on the part of the government which the powerful IG Metall trades union saw as an "alarm signal for every citizen" (ein "Alarmsignal für alle Bürger"). At the eleventh hour Hans Peter Bull was appointed West Germany's first Federal Commissioner for Data Protection. He took on the office in an atmosphere of widespread continuing scepticism on the challenges involved in Information Technology legislation.

Simitis died on 18 March 2023, at the age of 88.

== Memberships and commissions ==
Spiros Simitis has been a member of the German Council for International Private Law since 1966. Between 1966 and 1980 he was General Secretary of the International Data Commission (Generalsekretär der Internationalen Zivilstandskommission). In addition, between 1979 and 1982 he was a member of the standing deputation for Data Protection of the German Jurists Convention (Deutscher Juristentag), and between 1982 and 1986 he served as chair of the Council of Europe's Experts Commission on Data Protection questions. Since 1988 he has served as permanent advisor to the European Commission on Data Protection questions.

He served between 1990 and 1996 on the research council of the European University Institute in Florence, in 1994 as advisor to the ILO on creating a system for regulating employee data protection, and between 1998 and 1999 as chair of the European Commission's High-level-expert-commission on the Charter of Fundamental Rights of the European Union. Between 1999 and 2001 he was a member of the strategy commission dealing with further development of the European University Institute (Florence) and in 2001, through a German cabinet resolution, he joined the National Ethics Council ("Nationaler Ethikrat"), chairing it till 2005. He served on it again between 2008 and 2012 (by which time the former "Nationaler Ethikrat" had been renamed as the "Deutscher Ethikrat").

== Recognition and celebration ==
During his professional career Spiros Simitis received a succession of honours from international commissions and academic institutions. He was an honorary doctor of the Democritus University of Thrace since 1992, and also, from 2003, of the National and Kapodistrian University of Athens. He was also an honorary member of the German Jurists Convention (Deutscher Juristentag) from 2002 and a corresponding member of the Academy of Athens from 2003.

=== Further awards and honours (selection) ===
- 1981: Order of Merit of the Grand Duchy of Luxembourg (Commander)
- 1992: Hessian Order of Merit (Hessischer Verdienstorden)
- 1996: Order of Merit of the Federal Republic of Germany 1st class
- 1999: Commander of the Greek Order of Honour
- 2004: Officer of the French Legion of Honour
- 2010: Arnold Freymuth Society prize

== Publications (selection) ==
- Kommentar zum Bundesdatenschutzgesetz. Nomos-Verlags-Gesellschaft, Baden-Baden 1978, ISBN 3-7890-0357-3 (7., neu bearbeitete Auflage. ebenda 2011, ISBN 978-3-8329-4183-3).
- Zur Verrechtlichung der Arbeitsbeziehungen. In: Friedrich Kübler (compiler-editor): Verrechtlichung von Wirtschaft, Arbeit und sozialer Solidarität. Vergleichende Analysen. Nomos-Verlags-Gesellschaft, Baden-Baden 1984, ISBN 3-7890-1015-4, pp. 73–165.
- Kindschaftsrecht – Elemente einer Theorie des Familienrechts. In: Albrecht Dieckmann, Rainer Frank, Hans Hanisch, Spiros Simitis (Hrsg.): Festschrift für Wolfram Müller-Freienfels. Nomos-Verlags-Gesellschaft, Baden-Baden 1986, ISBN 3-7890-1244-0, pp. 579–616.
- Die verordnete Sprachlosigkeit: das Arbeitsverhältnis als Kommunikationsbarriere. In: Willy Brandt, Helmut Gollwitzer, Johann Friedrich Henschel (compiler-editor): Ein Richter, ein Bürger, ein Christ. Festschrift für Helmut Simon. Nomos-Verlags-Gesellschaft, Baden-Baden 1987, ISBN 3-7890-1468-0, pp. 329–358.
- Lob der Unvollständigkeit: Zur Dialektik der Transparenz personenbezogener Informationen. In: Herta Däubler-Gmelin, Klaus Kinkel, Hans Meyer, Helmut Simon (compiler-editor): Gegenrede. Aufklärung – Kritik – Öffentlichkeit. Festschrift für Ernst Gottfried Mahrenholz. Nomos-Verlags-Gesellschaft, Baden-Baden 1994, ISBN 3-7890-3369-3, pp. 573–592.
- with Ulrich Dammann: EG-Datenschutzrichtlinie. Kommentar. Nomos-Verlags-Gesellschaft, Baden-Baden 1997, ISBN 3-7890-4517-9.
- Internet oder der entzauberte Mythos vom "freien Markt der Meinungen". In: Heinz-Dieter Assmann, Georgois Gounalakis, Thomas Brinkmann, Rainer Walz: Wirtschafts- und Medienrecht in der offenen Demokratie. Freundesgabe für Friedrich Kübler zum 65. Geburtstag. Müller, Heidelberg 1997, ISBN 3-8114-9097-4, pp. 285–314.
- Auf dem Weg zu einem neuen Datenschutzkonzept. In: Datenschutz und Datensicherheit. Band 24, Nr. 12, 2000, ISSN 0724-4371, pp. 714–726.
- Data Protection in the European Union – The Quest for Common Rules. In: Collected Courses of the Academy of European Law. vol 8, Nr. 1, 2001, ZDB-ID 1123811-2, pp. 95–141.
- Der Streit um die Stasi-Akten oder die fortschreitende Enthistorisierung des Interpretationsprozesses. In: Cornelius Prittwitz, Michael Baurmann, Klaus Günther, Lothar Kuhlen, Reinhard Merkel, Cornelius Nestler, Lorenz Schulz (Hrsg.): Festschrift für Klaus Lüderssen. Zum 70. Geburtstag am 2. Mai 2002. Nomos-Verlags-Gesellschaft, Baden-Baden 2002, ISBN 3-7890-7887-5, pp. 141–151.
- Rechtliche Anwendungsmöglichkeiten kybernetischer Systeme. In: Recht und Staat in Geschichte und Gegenwart, 322. Mohr Siebeck, Tübingen, 1966
