= Katrin Uhlig =

German politician (born 1982)

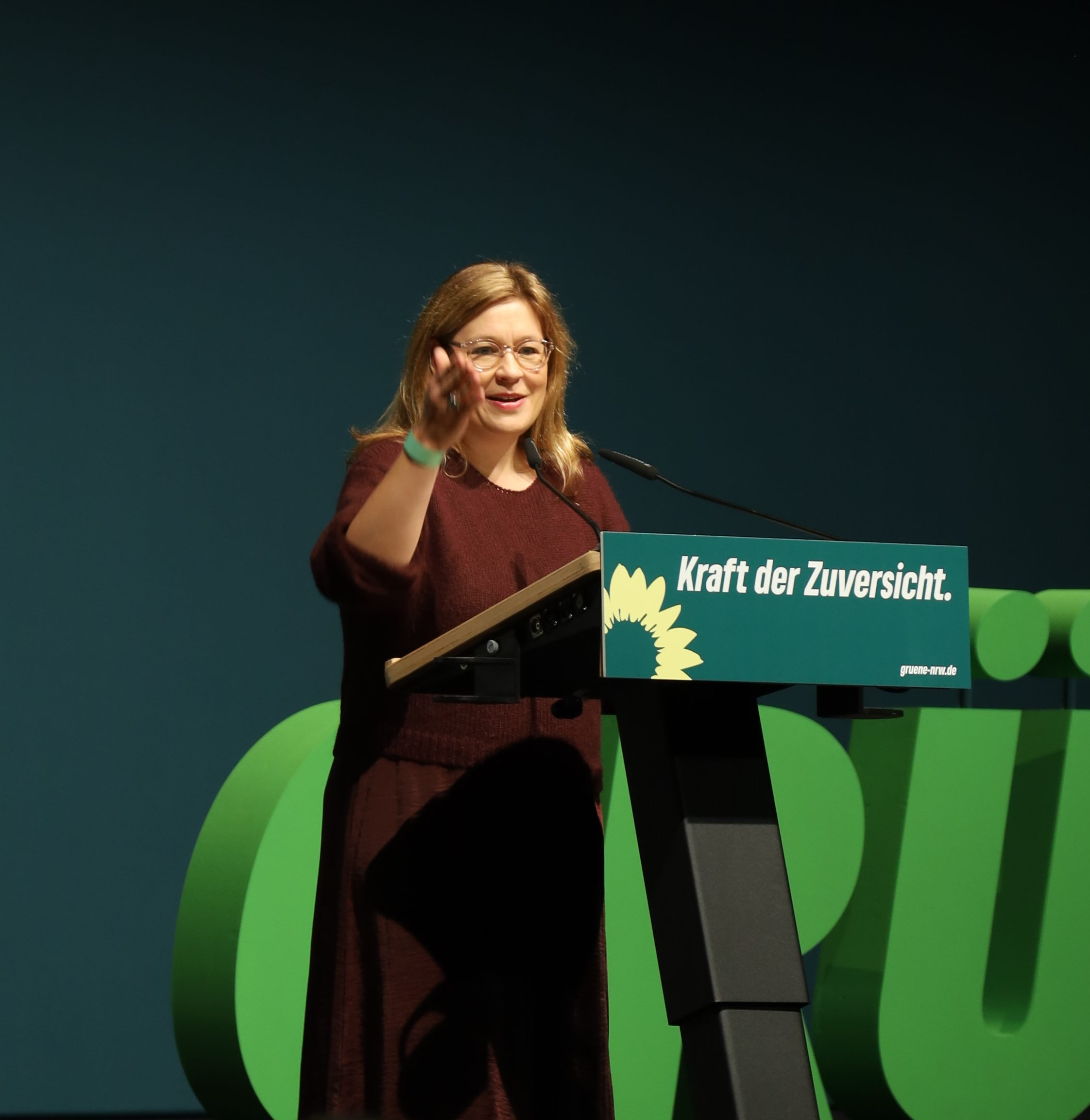

Member of the Bundestag
- Incumbent
- Assumed office 26 October 2021
- Constituency: Bonn

Personal details
- Born: 5 July 1982 (age 44) Duisburg, Germany
- Party: Alliance 90/The Greens
- Education: University of Passau

Katrin Uhlig (born 5 July 1982) is a German politician of the Alliance 90/The Greens who has been serving as a member of the Bundestag after the 2021 German federal election, representing the electoral constituency of Bonn.

== Early career ==
Upon graduating, Uhlig briefly worked at the European Climate Foundation in The Hague. She was a legislative advisor to the Green Party's parliamentary group in the State Parliament of North Rhine-Westphalia from 2010 to 2017. She moved to the German Association of Energy and Water Industries (BDEW) in 2017. From 2019 to 2021, Uhlig worked as legislative advisor to Oliver Krischer.

== Political career ==
In parliament, Uhlig has been serving on the Committee on Climate Action and Energy.

== Other activities ==
=== Regulatory agencies ===
- Federal Network Agency for Electricity, Gas, Telecommunications, Post and Railway (BNetzA), Alternate Member of the Advisory Board (since 2022)

=== Corporate boards ===
- GIZ, Member of the Board of Trustees (since 2025)

=== Non-profit organizations ===
- Bonn International Award for Democracy, Member of the Board of Trustees (since 2022)
- Haus der Geschichte, Member of the Board of Trustees (since 2022)
- German Federation for the Environment and Nature Conservation (BUND), Member
- German United Services Trade Union (ver.di), Member
