= Limbach, Westerwaldkreis =

Limbach
- Municipality
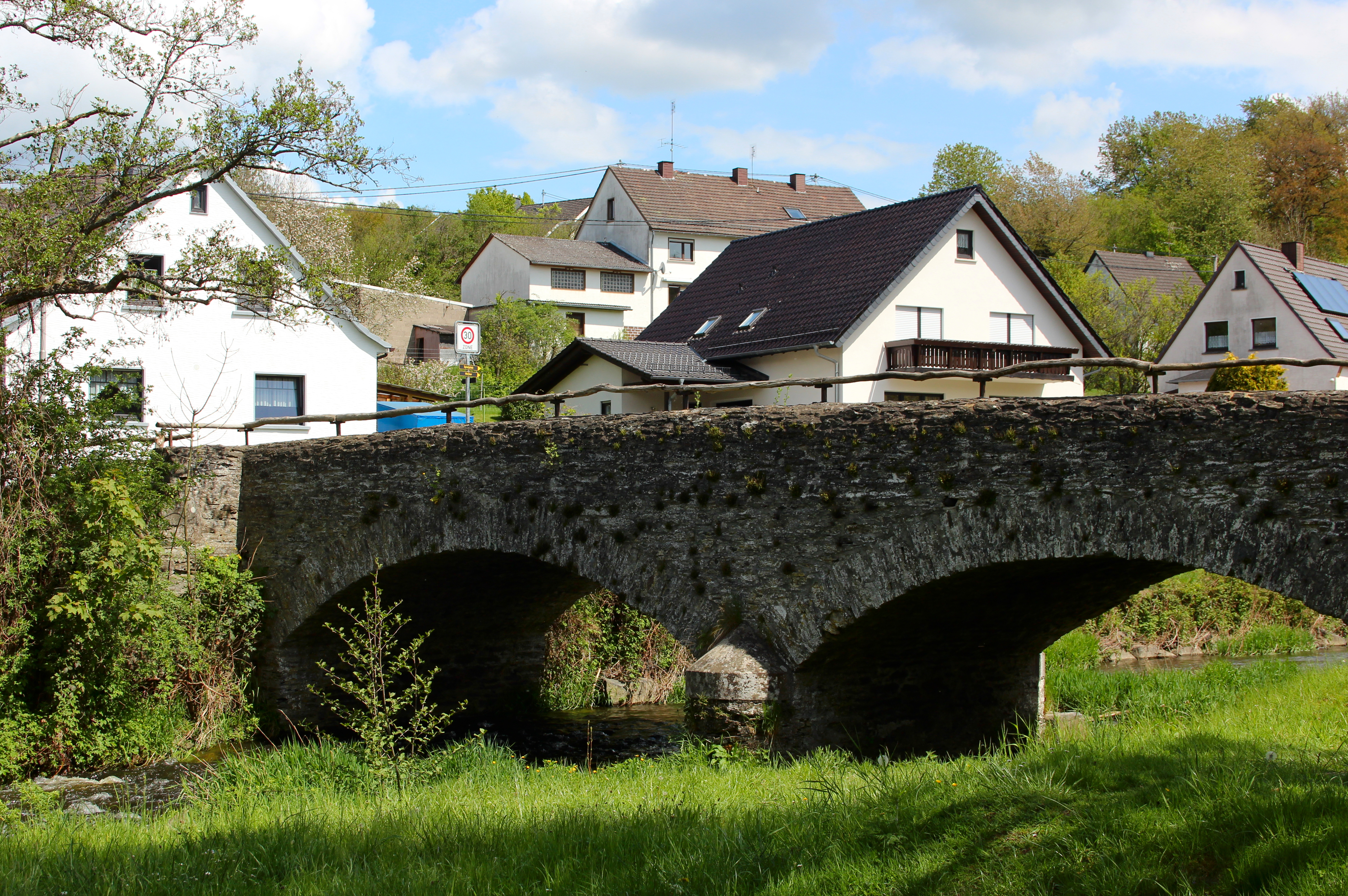

- Coat of arms

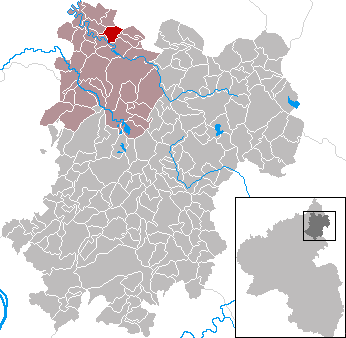
- Location of Limbach within Westerwaldkreis district
- Interactive map of Limbach
- Location within Germany Location within Rhineland-Palatinate
- Coordinates: 50°42′9″N 7°48′8″E
- Country: Germany
- State: Rhineland-Palatinate
- District: Westerwaldkreis
- Municipal assoc.: Hachenburg

Government
  - Mayor (2019–24): Ralph Hilger

Area
  - Total: 3.69 km^{2} (1.42 sq mi)
- Elevation: 265 m (869 ft)

Population (2025-12-31)
  - Total: 407
  - Density: 110/km^{2} (286/sq mi)
- Time zone: UTC+01:00 (CET)
  - Summer (DST): UTC+02:00 (CEST)
- Postal codes: 57629
- Dialling codes: 02662
- Vehicle registration: WW
- Website: www.limbach-ww.de

Limbach (German pronunciation: [ˈlɪmbax]) is an Ortsgemeinde – a community belonging to a Verbandsgemeinde – in the Westerwaldkreis in Rhineland-Palatinate, Germany. The agriculturally structured residential community belongs to the Verbandsgemeinde of Hachenburg, a kind of collective municipality. Its seat is in the like-named town.

== Geography ==
The state-recognized recreational resort (Erholungsort) lies in the Westerwald between Limburg and Siegen, on the Kleine Nister in the nature and landscape conservation area of the Kroppach Switzerland (Kroppacher Schweiz)

== History ==
In 1346, Limbach had its first documentary mention in a donation document.

== Politics ==
=== Municipal council ===
The municipal council is made up of 8 council members who were elected in a majority vote in a municipal election on 13 June 2004.

=== Town partnerships ===
Since 1998, a partnership has existed with the Hungarian community of Kács.

== Regular events ==
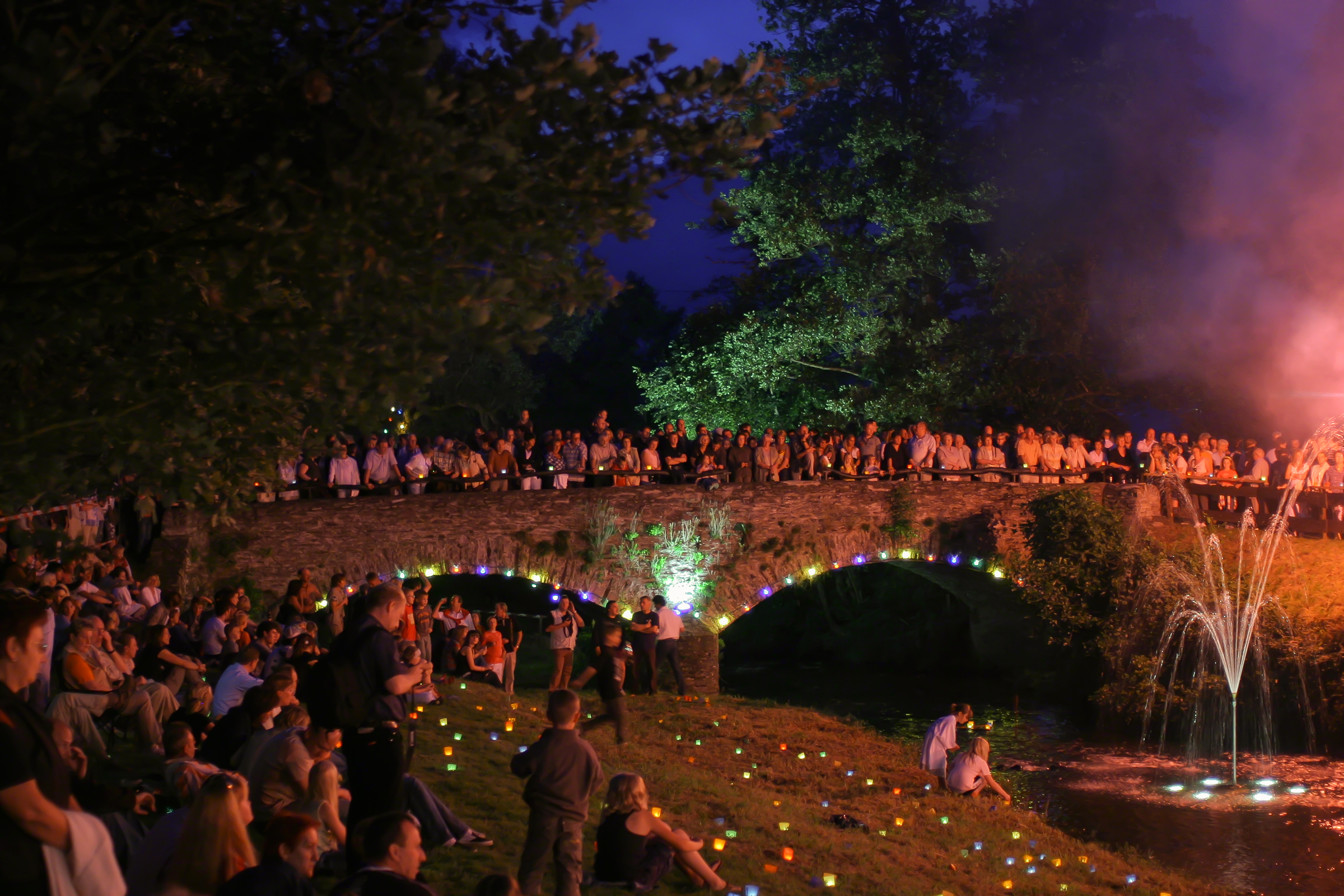
The old bridge during the Brückenfest

The Brückenfest (“Bridge Festival”), held on the second Saturday in July, is the summer night event in the Kroppacher Schweiz region attracting some thousand visitors each year. It takes place on and around the local stone arch bridge from 1871.

== Economy and infrastructure ==
The local bus line 410 serves Limbach on it'route from Hachenburg to Wissen, Limbach is located in the area of the transport association Verkehrsverbund Rhein-Mosel (VRM), in the zone number 453. South of the community runs Bundesstraße 414, leading from Hohenroth to Hachenburg. The nearest Autobahn interchanges are in Siegen, Wilnsdorf and Herborn on the A 45 (Dortmund–Gießen). The nearest interchanges on the A 3 (Cologne–Frankfurt) are in Montabaur und Mogendorf. The nearest railway stop is Hattert, (Limburg-Altenkirchen railway), nearest InterCityExpress stop is Montabaur on the Cologne-Frankfurt high-speed rail line. Limbach is located at the Marienwanderweg, a walking path leading from Marienstatt Abbey in Streithausen to Marienthal Abbey (Westerwald).
