= Matthias Heider =

German lawyer and politician

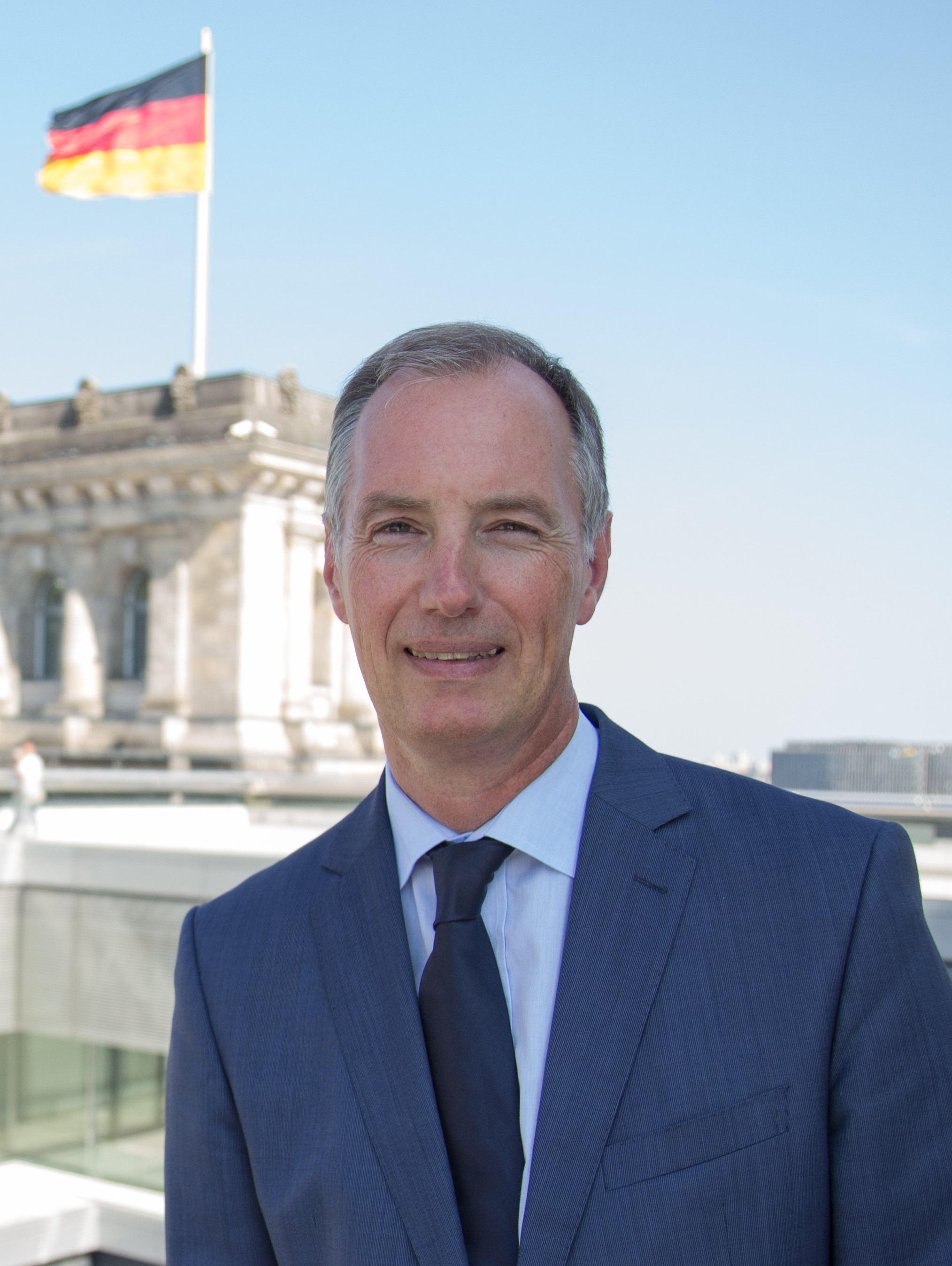

Member of the Bundestag
- In office 2009–2021
- Preceded by: Hartmut Schauerte

Personal details
- Born: 18 May 1966 (age 60) Lüdenscheid, West Germany (now Germany)
- Citizenship: German
- Party: CDU
- Children: 1
- Education: University of Bonn
- Occupation: Lawyer

Matthias Heider (born 18 May 1966 in Lüdenscheid, Germany) is a German lawyer and politician of the Christian Democratic Union (CDU) who served as a member of the German Bundestag from 2009 until 2021.

== Early life and education ==
Heider attended the University of Bonn, read law, and graduated in 1992. He then started to work as a lawyer in various positions, including management positions in large companies. He was awarded a doctorate in law in 2003.

== Political career ==
Heider first became a Member of the German Bundestag in the 2009 elections, representing the 149 (Olpe - Märkischer Kreis I) constituency in North Rhine-Westphalia. He was reelected in 2013 and 2017 by first-past-the-post voting, securing comfortable majorities.

In parliament, Heider served on the Committee on Economic Affairs and Energy from 2009 until 2021; in 2018, he became its deputy chairman. He also served on the Committee on the Environment, Nature Conservation, Building and Nuclear Safety from 2009 until 2013.

In addition to his committee assignments, Heider became chairman of the German-American Parliamentary Friendship Group in 2018, succeeding Peer Steinbrück. He was also a board member of the CDU/CSU Parliamentary Group (since 2014) and his parliamentary group's rapporteur on antitrust and competition law (from 2013). Heider was a member of the Commission on Competition Law 4.0 of the Federal Ministry for Economic Affairs and Energy from 2018 to 2019.

Heider was elected twice (2017, 2019) Deputy Chairman of the Mittelstands- und Wirtschaftsunion (MIT), the economically liberal wing of the CDU/CSU.

In October 2020, Heider announced that he would not stand in the 2021 federal elections and resign from active politics by the end of the parliamentary term.

== Other activities ==
=== Corporate boards ===
- ERGO Group, Member of the Advisory Board (2009-2014)

=== Non-profit organizations ===
- Federal Network Agency for Electricity, Gas, Telecommunications, Post and Railway (BNetzA), Alternate Member of the Advisory Board (since 2014)
- Rotary International, Member
- Deutsche Industrieforschungsgemeinschaft Konrad Zuse, Member of the Senate

== Political positions ==
In June 2017, Heider voted against Germany's introduction of same-sex marriage.

== Personal life ==
Heider is married and has one child. He is a Roman Catholic and lives in his home town of Lüdenscheid.
