= Hans Daniels =

German politician

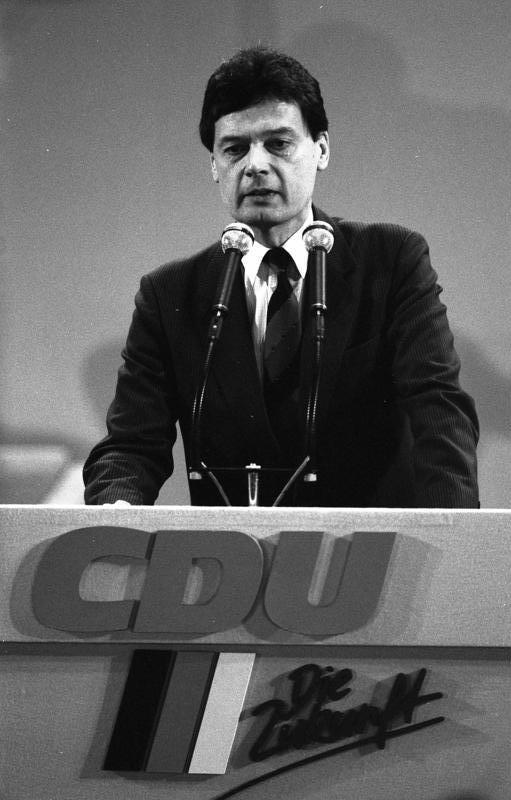
- Hans Daniels at the federal party conference 1987

Member of the Bundestag
- In office 29 March 1983 – 20 December 1990

Personal details
- Born: 11 December 1934 (age 91) Düsseldorf, Germany
- Party: CDU

Hans Daniels (born 11 December 1934) is a German politician of the Christian Democratic Union (CDU) and former member of the German Bundestag.

== Life ==
Daniels joined the CDU in 1955. He was chairman of the Junge Union in Bonn in 1957/58 and has been a member of the Rhineland CDU state executive committee since 1971. He was a member of the North Rhine-Westphalian state parliament from 26 July 1970 to 30 March 1983 and was chairman of the committee for local politics there from 1980 to 1983.

He was a member of the German Bundestag from 29 March 1983 to 20 December 1990. In Parliament he represented the constituency of Bonn.

== Literature ==
Herbst, Ludolf; Jahn, Bruno (2002). Vierhaus, Rudolf (ed.). Biographisches Handbuch der Mitglieder des Deutschen Bundestages. 1949–2002 [Biographical Handbook of the Members of the German Bundestag. 1949–2002] (in German). München: De Gruyter - De Gruyter Saur. p. 1715. ISBN 978-3-11-184511-1.
