= Zugangserschwerungsgesetz =

Child sexual abuse protection law in Germany

The Zugangserschwerungsgesetz (Access Impediment Act, or ZugErschwG) was a German law that aimed to make it difficult to access sites on the World Wide Web with depictions of sexual activity by and against children (child pornography). The Federal Criminal Police Office would maintain a list of sites found to contain child pornography as defined by German criminal law. A two-fold strategy was intended: if it proved impossible to have offending sites taken down in appropriate time, German Internet service providers would be required to block access to the sites through methods such as DNS poisoning. Surfers would be redirected to a page showing a “stop” sign. Prosecution solely because of an attempt to access blocked site or domain was not planned.

The move to introduce Internet blocking started in 2008; it was promoted by Ursula von der Leyen, then minister for family affairs, who campaigned for ISPs to introduce blocking through self-regulatory agreements with the government. Some providers signed such agreements, but before any measures could be implemented, the government decided that a stronger legal foundation was required. This led to the Bundestag passing the Zugangserschwerungsgesetz on 18 June 2009. From the start, the project was the subject of intense political debate, in which the family minister gained the iconic nickname Zensursula – a portmanteau of the German word Zensur for “censorship” and her first name Ursula. Arguments were put forward that blocking was ineffective, it was seen as an introduction of censorship, and many legal experts believed the act violated the German constitution.

The tide turned when federal elections in September 2009 led to a change in the government coalition. The Social Democrats, which had supported the law, suffered heavy losses and were replaced by the Free Democrats, who had achieved a record result and had spoken out against Internet blocking. The new coalition agreed that no further moves towards blocking would be made. In November 2009, German President Horst Köhler decided to ask the government for further information before he could sign the act, but ultimately he found no reasons to stop the act's passage into law and gave his signature in February 2010. As the new government had already resolved not to implement Internet blocking, a “non-application directive” was issued by the government, instructing the Criminal Police Office that only the act's take-down provisions were to be used. A review was to take place after one year. In April 2011, the government finally decided to repeal the Zugangserschwerungsgesetz altogether. The revocation bill completed its passage through the Bundestag on 1 December 2011.

== See also ==
- Clean IT Project
- Internet censorship in Germany
