= Ilse Grubrich-Simitis =

German psychoanalyst (1936–2024)

Ilse Grubrich-Simitis (22 February 1936 – 8 August 2024) was a German psychoanalyst. She worked in private practice and as a training analyst at the Frankfurt Psychoanalytical Institute. She is best known for her research on the original manuscripts of Sigmund Freud, for which she won several awards, and much of which was incorporated into the Revised Standard Edition of Freud's work. Her familiarity with Freud's manuscripts led her to be considered the true successor to James Strachey, the original editor and translator of the Standard Edition.

== Biography ==
Ilse Grubrich-Simitis was born on 22 February 1936. She attended university from 1955 to 1959 at Ulm School of Design. After completing her studies, she became an editor at S. Fischer Verlag, where she contributed to the publication of Sigmund Freud's works from the 1960s onwards. She eventually underwent psychoanalytic training between 1972 and 1978 at the Sigmund Freud Institute in Frankfurt (then directed by Alexander Mitscherlich) to become a psychoanalyst herself. She married the lawyer and data-protection expert Spiros Simitis on 3 August 1963. Grubrich-Simitis died on 8 August 2024, at the age of 88.

== Freud ==
Grubrich-Simitis worked for several decades as an academic researcher on the work Sigmund Freud on whom she published several substantial volumes, contributing to a greater appreciation of Freud's handwritten work and composition process. One of her major contributions to Freud scholarship was her discovery of the manuscript of one of Freud's unpublished metapsychological papers, which until then were thought to have all been lost or destroyed by Freud. In addition, she also published on the impact of the Holocaust on the descendants of the survivors.

Since the 1960s she worked for S. Fischer Verlag, initially as a publishing-editor, but eventually assumed greater editorial responsibility as the scope of the projects and their level of required expertise grew. Some of the major projects she was involved with at S. Fischer include the 11-volume Studienausgabe (the German adaptation of the Standard Edition), the regular paperback editions of Freud's work (Werke im Taschenbuch), and the five-volume Freud-Martha Bernays correspondence (Die Brautbriefe). Recently she was also a co-editor of the publisher's Yearbook of Psychoanalysis.

== Awards and honours ==
- 1998 Sigmund Freud Prize for Academic prose
- 1998 Mary S. Sigourney Award

== Publications (selected) ==
=== Books ===
- Freud's Moses-Studie als Tagtraum: Ein biographischer Essay. Fischer Verlag, 1994, ISBN 978-3-596-12230-1
  - English translation published in: Early Freud and Late Freud: Reading Anew Studies on Hysteria and Moses and Monotheism. Translated by Philip Slotkin. Routledge, 1997. ISBN 978-0-415-14844-3.
- Zurück zu Freuds Texten: Stumme Dokumente sprechen machen. Fischer Verlag, 1993. ISBN 978-3-10-028606-2
  - English translation: Back to Freud's Texts: Making Silent Documents Speak. Translated by Philip Slotkin. Yale University Press, 1996. ISBN 978-0-300-06631-9
- Michelangelos Moses und Freuds »Wagstück «: Eine Collage. Fischer Verlag, 2004, ISBN 978-3-10-074400-5 [English: Michelangelo’s Moses and Freud’s ‘Daring Piece’]

=== Articles ===
- (1971) Sigmund Freuds Lebensgeschichte und die Anfänge der Psychoanalyse, Neue Rundschau, vo.82, pp.311-33
  - Also published as the introduction to »Selbstdarstellung«: Schriften zur Geschichte der Psychoanalyse. Fischer Verlag 1971.
- (1981) Extreme Traumatization as Cumulative Trauma: Psychoanalytic Investigations of the Effects of Concentration Camp Experiences on Survivors and Their Children, The Psychoanalytic Study of the Child, 36:1, 415-450, doi:10.1080/00797308.1981.11823352
- (1984) From Concretism to Metaphor, The Psychoanalytic Study of the Child, 39:1, 301-319, doi:10.1080/00797308.1984.11823431
- (1986) Reflections on Sigmund Freud's Relationship to the German Language and to Some German-Speaking Authors of the Enlightenment, International Journal of Psycho-Analysis, vol.13, part 3, pp.287-94.
- (1986) Six Letters of Sigmund Freud and Sandor Ferenczi on the Interrelationship of Psychoanalytic Theory and Technique, International Review of Psycho-Analysis, vol. 13, part 3, pp. 259-77.
- (1988) Trauma or Drive—Drive and Trauma, The Psychoanalytic Study of the Child, 43:1, 3-32, doi:10.1080/00797308.1988.11822733
- (1989) Zur Geschichte der deutschsprachigen Freud-Ausgaben, Psyche, vol.43, pp.773-802 and 889-917.
  - Also presented in a revised form in Zurück zu Freuds Texten, Fischer Verlag, 1993.
- (1995) 'No Greater, Richer, More Mysterious Subject [...] than the Life of the Mind.' An Early Exchange of Letters Between Freud and Einstein, International Journal of Psycho-Analysis, vol.76, part 1, pp. 115-22.
- (1995) Urbuch der Psychoanalyse. Hundert Jahre »Studien über Hysterie« von Josef Breuer und Sigmund Freud. (1995). Psyche - Zeitschrift für Psychoanalyse, Volume 49, Issue 12:1117-1155.
  - English Translation Published in: Early Freud and Late Freud: Reading Anew Studies on Hysteria and Moses and Monotheism. Translated by Philip Slotkin. Routledge, 1997. ISBN 978-0-415-14844-3.
- (1999) 'Metamorphosen der ›Traumdeutung‹ : Über Freuds Umgang mit seinem Jahrhundertbuch.' Published in the companion book to the S. Fischer Verlag reprint of the first German edition of The Interpretation of Dreams.
  - Reprinted, with minor revisions, in Hundert Jahre ›Traumdeutung‹ von Sigmund Freud: Drei Essays Fischer Verlag, 2000. ISBN 978-3-596-14928-5.
  - English translation: 'Metamorphoses of the interpretation of dreams. Freud's conflicted relations with his book of the century,' International Journal of Psychoanalysis, 2000, Issue 81 Vol. 6 pp.1155-1183
- (2002) “How Freud Wrote and Revised His Interpretation Of Dreams: Conflicts Around The Subjective Origins Of The Book Of The Century.” Psychoanalysis and History 4(2), 2002.
- (2005) “How Are You Managing with Heating And Lighting, Herr Professor?” On The Publication of The Freud–Eitingon Correspondence, Psychoanalytic Quarterly, LXXIV.
- (2010) Reality Testing in Place of Interpretation: A Phase in Psychoanalytic Work with Descendants of Holocaust Survivors, Psychoanalytic Quarterly, LXXIX No.1

=== Editorial work ===
- Sigmund Freud: »Selbstdarstellung«: Schriften zur Geschichte der Psychoanalyse. Herausgegeben und eingeleitet von Ilse Grubrich-Simitis. Fischer Verlag 1971 (Korrigierte Auflage ab September 1973). ISBN 978-3-596-26096-6
- Sigmund Freud: Studienausgabe Ergänzungsband: Schriften zur Behandlungstechnik. Mitherausgeber des Ergängzungsbandes Ilse Grubrich-Simitis. S. Fischer Verlag, 1975.
  - Corrected reprint published under Fischer Taschenbuch Verlag, 1982. ISBN 978-3-596-27311-9
- Sigmund Freud: Das Motiv der Kästchenwahl. Mehrfarbige Faksimileausgabe im Originalformat von Freuds großflächigen Manuskriptblättern. Hrsg. Ilse Grubrich-Simitis Fischer Verlag, 1977. [English: The Theme of the Three Caskets. Multicolored facsimile edition in the original format of Freud's large manuscript sheets]
- Sigmund Freud: His Life in Pictures and Words. Edited by Ernst Freud, Lucie Freud, and Ilse Grubrich-Simitis, with a biographical sketch by K.R. Eissler. Translation by Christine Trollope. Harcourt Brace Jovanovich, Inc., 1978. ISBN 978-0-15-182546-2
- Sigmund Freud: Übersicht der Übertragungsneurosen: Ein bisher unbekanntes Manuskript. Herausgegeben und mit einem Essay von Ilse Grubrich-Simitis. Fischer Verlag, 1985. ISBN 978-3-10-022803-1
  - English Translation: A Phylogenetic Fantasy: Overview of the Transference Neuroses. Edited and with an essay by Ilse Grubrich-Simitis. Translated by Axel Hoffer and Peter T. Hoffer. The Belknap Press of Harvard University Press, 1987. ISBN 978-0-674-66635-1. https://books.google.com/books?id=FMpdOl8-pcoC)
- Sigmund Freud, Gesammelte Werke: Nachtragsband, Texte aus den Jahren 1885 bis 1938. Herausgegeben von Angela Richards unter Mitwirkung von Ilse Grubrich-Simitis. S Fischer Verlag, 1987. ISBN 978-3-10-022805-5
- Siegfried Bernfeld, Suzanne Cassirer Bernfeld: Bausteine der Freud-Biographik. Eingeleitet, herausgegeben und übersetzt von Ilse Grubrich-Simitis. Suhrkamp, 1988. ISBN 978-3-518-28327-1
- Urbuch der Psychoanalyse: hundert Jahre Studien über Hysterie von Josef Breuer und Sigmund Freud. Fischer Verlag, 1995, ISBN 978-3-10-007903-9.
- Sigmund Freud: Werkausgabe in zwei Bänden. Band 1: Elemente der Psychoanalyse. Band 2: Anwendungen der Psychoanalyse. Hrsg. und komm. von Anna Freud und Ilse Grubrich-Simitis. Fischer Verlag, 2006. ISBN 978-3-596-17216-0.
