= Luise Limbach =

German soprano

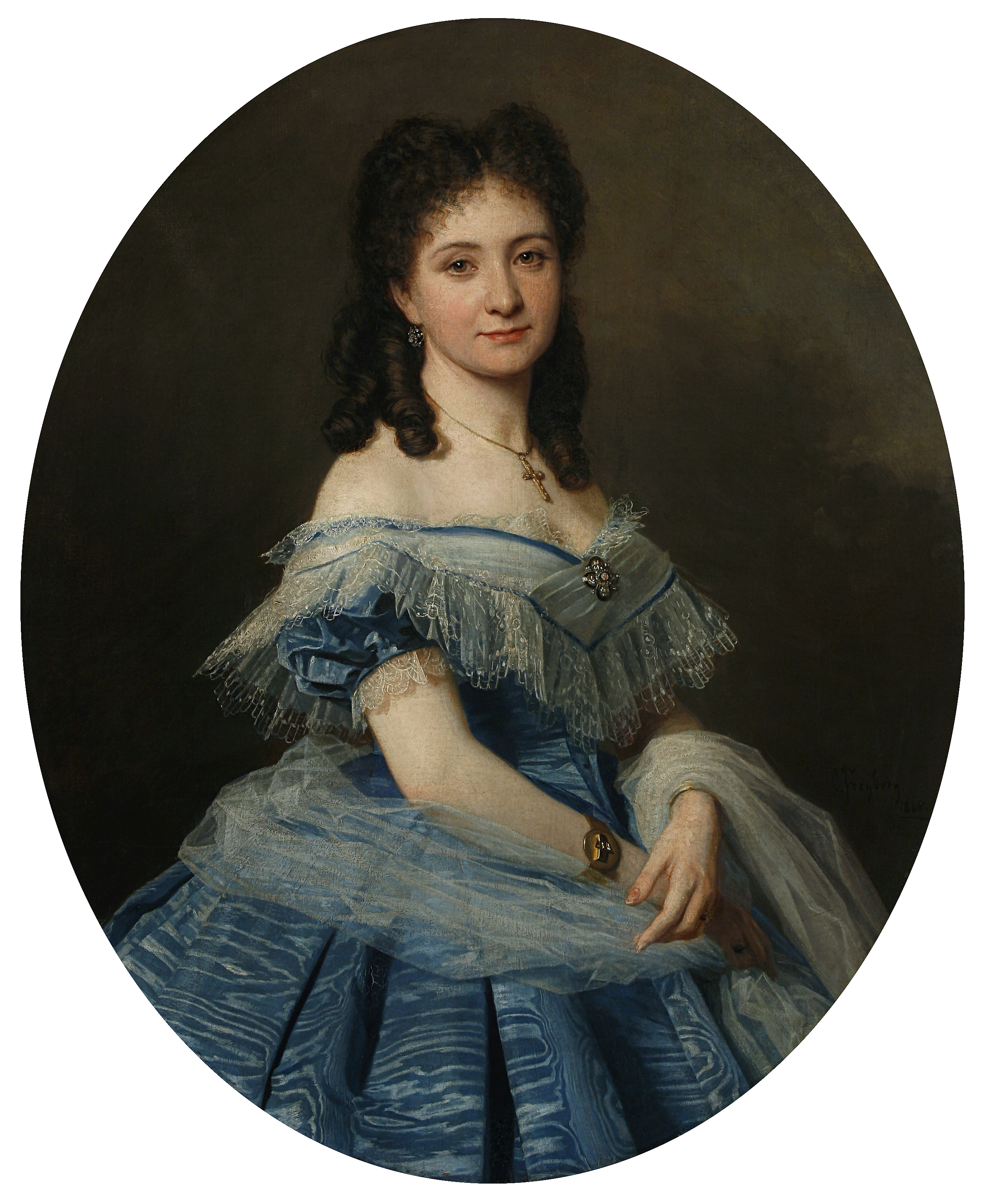
1868 Portrait of Luise Limbach by Conrad Freyberg

Luise Mathilde Limbach (October 8, 1834 – October 10, 1909) was a German soprano. She had a moderately successful career in the latter half of the 19th century. She was known for her pure voice and acting skill.

== Personal life ==
Limbach was born to artistic parents in Düsseldorf in 1834. Her father was the actor and director Friedrich Heinrich Limbach (1801-1887), and her mother was the actress and singer Mathilde Auguste Hildebrandt (1801-1885). In 1868 a portrait was made of her by the German artist Conrad Freybergde In 1876 she married Heinrich Wilhelm Viktor Gustav von Carnap, a Prussian police chief, in St George's German Lutheran Church in the Whitechapel district of London. After marrying, Limbach lived in Berlin until her death in 1909.

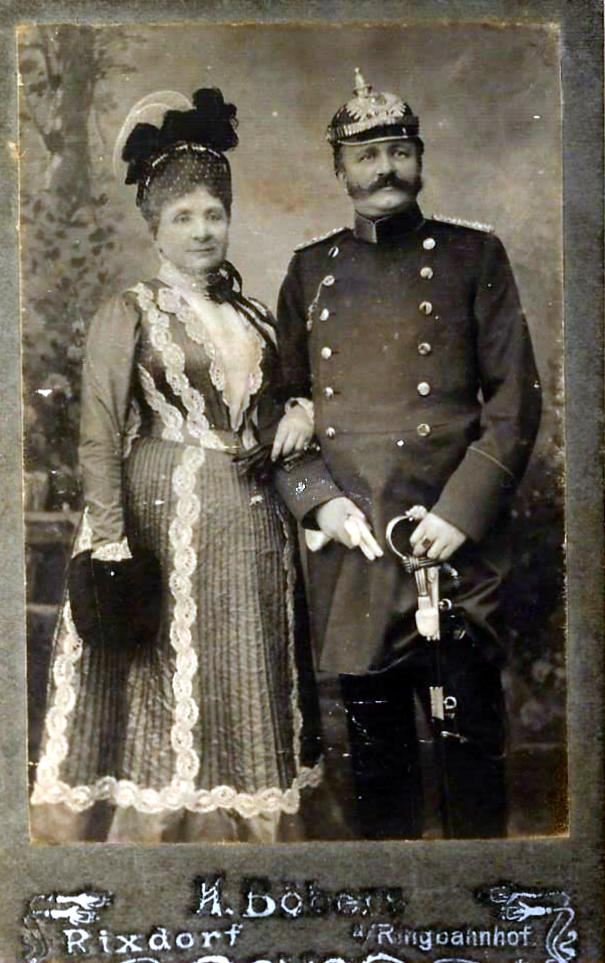
Limbach with her husband after their wedding in London

== Career ==
Limbach began her career as a child, travelling with the support of her parents. After her basic education, she received singing lessons in Braunschweig from court conductor Franz Abt at the expense of the Staatstheater Braunschweig and thereafter held a long-term commitment there performing in many operas.

In 1858 she had her first foreign engagement in Breslau, now usually known as Wrocław. From 1859 to 1862 she was a member of the ensemble at the Hoftheater Darmstadt, but often toured as a guest performer, for example at the Friedrich-Wilhelmstädtisches Theater and the Kroll Opera House in Berlin. In 1862 she moved to the Quai Theater in Vienna. From 1863 to 1865 she had an engagement in Berlin. After this, she was absent from the stage for many years. She retired permanently upon her marriage in 1876.

== Roles ==
Limbach's repertoire was rather broad, and she was considered a versatile performer. Her roles included many that are still part of the repertoire in the 21st century:

- Zerline in Fra Diavolo by Daniel Auber
- Clotilde in Norma by Vincenzo Bellini
- Urbain in Les Huguenots composed by Giacomo Meyerbeer
- Nancy in Martha by Friedrich von Flotow
- Leonore in Alessandro Stradella by Flotow
- Marie in Zar und Zimmermann by Albert Lortzing
- Zerlina in Don Giovanni by Wolfgang Amadeus Mozart
- Eurydice in Orpheus in the Underworld by Jacques Offenbach
- Helen of Troy in La belle Hélène by Offenbach
- Gemmy in William Tell by Gioachino Rossini
- Rosalinde in Die Fledermaus by Johann Strauss II
- Ännchen in Der Freischütz by Carl Maria von Weber

Her measured interpretation of both Eurydice and the eponymous role in La belle Hélène is said to have contributed to the fact that Offenbach's operettas were finally accepted and therefore appeared more frequently on the discerning German stage.
