= Paul Schäfer (politician) =

German politician and diplomat

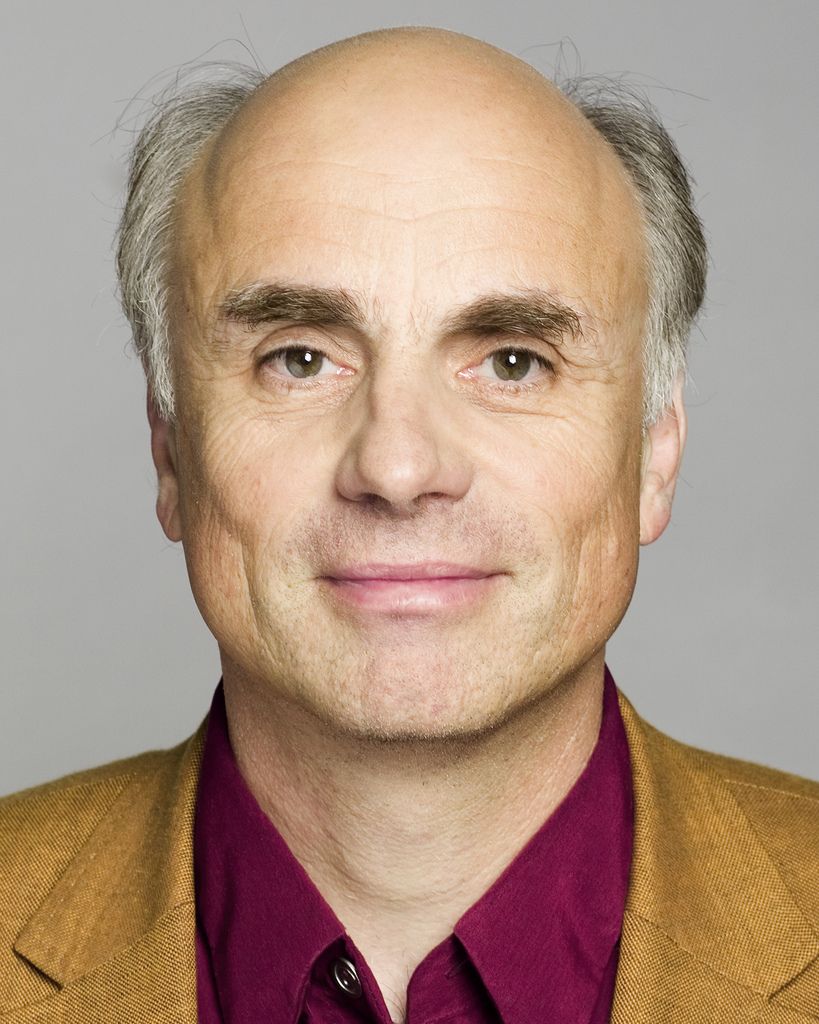
Paul Schäfer (politician).

Paul Schäfer (born 18 January 1949 in Mainz) is a German politician and diplomat. In 1978 he received a diploma in sociology. From 1983 to 1990 he was editor of the magazine Wissenschaft und Frieden ('Science and Peace').

== Political life ==
He is the deputy for Die Linkspartei. From 1970 to 1988 he was a member of the DKP, then from 1993 to 1999 he was a member of the SPD. In 2000 he joined the PDS (now 'Die Linkspartei'). He has been regional chairman for the party in North Rhine-Westphalia since May 2003, and a member of the party's executive committee since October 2004. In the 2005 federal election he was elected to the Bundestag on the party list for North Rhine-Westphalia.
