= Editha Limbach =

German politician (1933 – 2023)

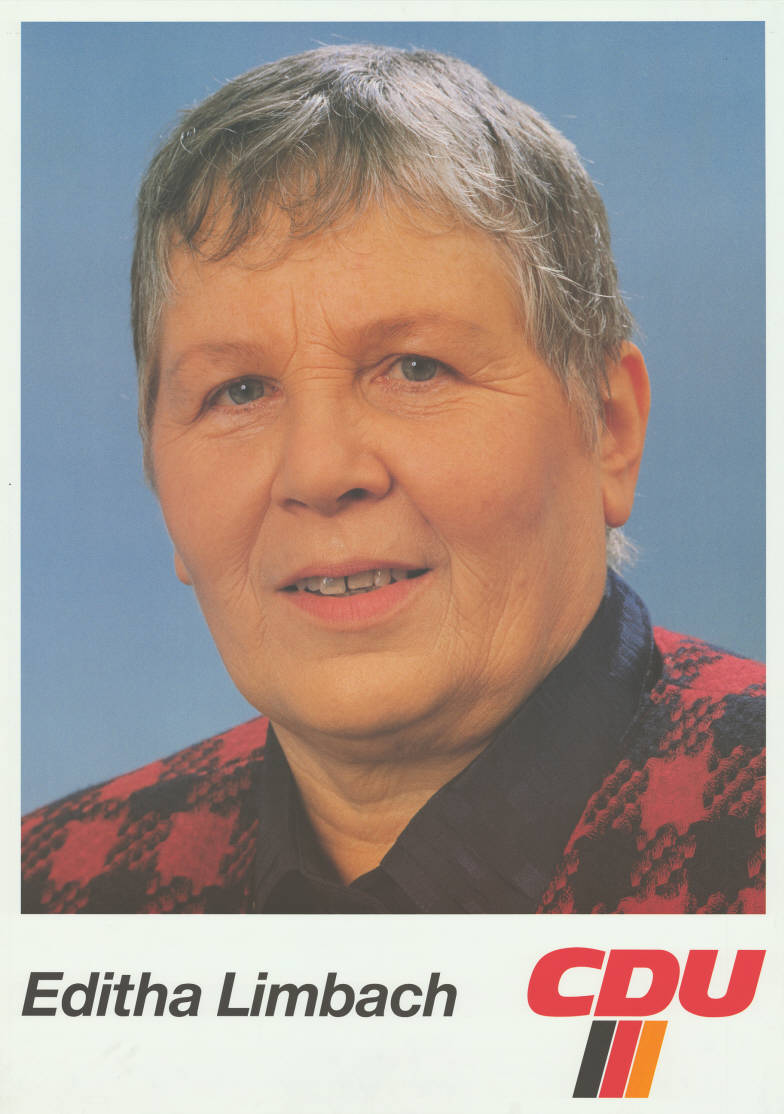
- Editha Limbach

Member of the German Bundestag
- In office 1987–1998
- Constituency: Bonn

Personal details
- Born: February 1, 1933
- Died: June 28, 2023 (aged 90)
- Party: CDU
- Profession: Politician, journalist and editor

Editha Limbach (February 1, 1933 – June 28, 2023) was a German politician (CDU). She served as a member of the German Bundestag from 1987 to 1998.

== Early life and career ==
After completing her secondary education, Limbach studied History and Social Sciences in Bonn and New York. Later, she worked as a journalist and editor for several years.

In 1960, Limbach joined the CDU (Christian Democratic Union), where she served as deputy district board member from 1970 to 1988 and later as deputy district chairperson. From 1975 to 1989, she was a member of the City Council of Bonn, where she held the position of deputy faction leader.

From 1987 to 1998, Editha Limbach was a member of the German Bundestag. Initially elected via the state list of North Rhine-Westphalia, she later won direct elections in the Bonn constituency. Following her tenure as a member of parliament, Limbach served as the deputy chairperson of the UN Refugee Agency from 1998 to 2010.

== Sources ==
- Kürschners Volkshandbuch: Deutscher Bundestag, 13. Wahlperiode, Neue Darmstädter Verlagsanstalt, 76. Auflage 1996
