= Federal Commissioner for Data Protection and Freedom of Information =

German government position

Federal Commissioner for Data Protection and Freedom of Information Bundesbeauftragter für den Datenschutz und die Informationsfreiheit
- Abbreviation: BfDI

Agency overview
- Formed: 1 January 1978 (48 years ago)

Jurisdictional structure
- Federal agency (Operations jurisdiction): Germany
- Operations jurisdiction: Germany
- Legal jurisdiction: The BfDI is a completely independent authority not being under any external supervision.
- General nature: Federal law enforcement

Operational structure
- Headquarters: Bonn, North Rhine-Westphalia
- Agency executive: Moritz Hennemann

Website
- http://www.bfdi.bund.de

The Federal Commissioner for Data Protection and Freedom of Information (BfDI, German: Bundesbeauftragter für den Datenschutz und die Informationsfreiheit), referring to either a person or the agency they lead, is tasked with supervising data protection as well as acting in an ombudsman function in freedom of information. The latter was introduced with the German Freedom of Information Act on 1 January 2006. In 2016, it became an independent federal agency under EU regulations.

Under the motto "Access for one, access for all", the BfDI openly publishes speeches, lectures and documents that have been requested by citizens through Freedom of Information requests.

In 2021, the BfDI was given responsibility for advising and monitoring the Federal Environmental Information Act. In May 2022, the BfDI had the highest relative job growth of all German federal authorities. Between 2017 and 2021, the authority grew by 116%.

== List of commissioners ==
No.	Name	Time in office	Party
1	Hans Peter Bull	1978–1983	SPD
2	Reinhold Baumann	1983–1988	independent
3	Alfred Einwag	1988–1993	independent
4	Joachim Jacob	1993–2003	FDP
5	Peter Schaar	2003–2013	Alliance 90/The Greens
6	Andrea Voßhoff	2014–2019	CDU
7	Ulrich Kelber	2019–2024	SPD
8	Louisa Specht-Riemenschneider	2024–2026	independent
9	Moritz Hennemann	2026–present	independent

== See also ==
- Information commissioner
