= GVL (copyright collection society) =

German performing rights society

- Gesellschaft zur Verwertung von Leistungsschutzrechten mbH
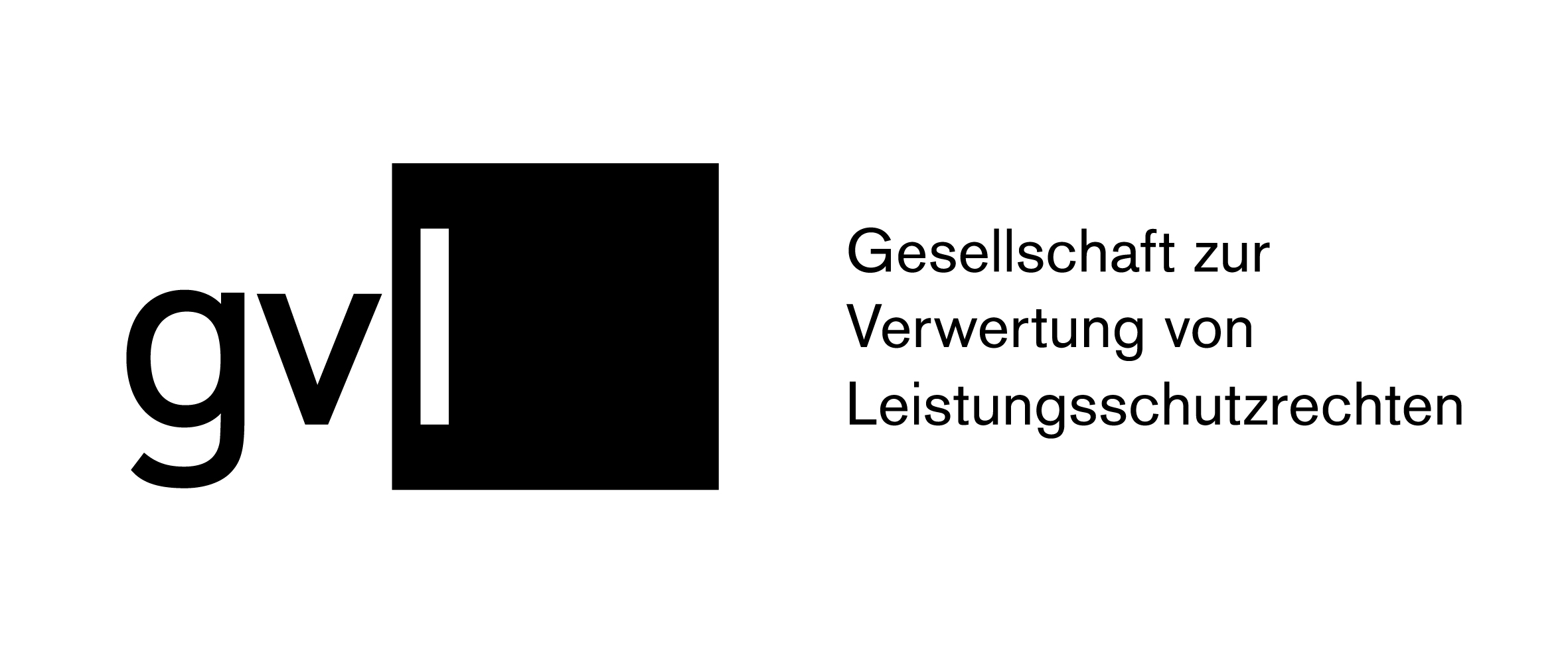
- Founded: 1959
- Founder: Deutsche Orchestervereinigung e.V. (DOV) and the Deutsche Landesgruppe der internationalen Vareinigung der phonographischen industrie
- Type: GmbH Company with limited liability
- Registration no.: Company registration number: District Court Charlottenburg, HRB 92075
- Location: Berlin, Germany
- Region served: International
- Services: Music copyright collection organisation
- Key people: Guido Evers; Tilo Gerlach
- Revenue: €230 million (2019)
- Website: www.gvl.de/en

The GVL (German: Gesellschaft zur Verwertung von Leistungsschutzrechten mbH) is a German music copyright collection society that represents the interests of performing artists and producers of sound recordings. Its German name translates to English as "Society for the exploitation of ancillary copyrights".

Incorporated in 1959, the GVL represents 160,000 performers and over 12,000 rights-holders. They have international agreements in place, often referred to as "reciprocal deals" with music copyright collection societies including Phonographic Performance Limited (PPL), the oldest established sound recordings copyright collective. The GVL also collects so-called "secondary exploitation rights" on behalf of its members.

The total income of the GVL in 2014 was €163.4 million. The GVL collected approximately €230 million ($261 million) for members in 2018, a 25.9 percent decline of income compared to the previous year's high of €310 million ($352 million). In May 2020 GEMA and GVL called for a state aid program for all sectors of the music industry in view of the effects of the COVID-19 pandemic.

== History ==
=== Foundation of GVL (1959) ===
The GVL was founded as a joint society in 1959 by the German orchestra union, Deutsche Orchestervereinigung e.V. (DOV) and the private company Deutsche Landesgruppe der internationalen Vareinigung der phonographischen industrie, which was the German national group of the International Federation of the Phonographic Industry (IFPI). The first two managing directors were Herrmann Voss and Rudi Thalheim. Its full legal name is Gesellschaft zur Verwertung von Leistungsschutzrechten mbH.

=== Foundation of ZPÜ (1963) ===
On 16 May 1963 GEMA, VG Wort and the GVL founded ZPÜ which is, as of 2020, an association of nine German collective management organisations which asserts claims for remuneration, information and reporting related to reproductions/copies of audio and audiovisual works pursuant to Art. 53 paragraph 1-3 German Copyright Ac. Due to massive back payments, the GVL collected nearly €170 million ($200 million) in this sector in 2017.

=== The German Copyright Act (1965) ===
On 9 September 1965 the German legislature integrated Neighbouring Rights into the Copyright Law of Germany called Urheberrechtsgesetz (UrhG) as Related Rights to both Producers and Performers.

=== Introduction of the Label Code (1976) ===
Since 1 May 1976, the GVL had used the Label Code (also referred to as "Labelcode") for its internal data. The first issued Label Code 00001 was in 1977 and was issued to the record company Ultraphone. Label Codes made it easier for broadcasters to detect which recordings were covered by the broadcasting license agreement with the GVL. The Broadcast Reports are vital for the remuneration of producers. However, the absence of individual track identification and associated Performers via the Label Code system via ISRC use has meant allocation of some performers' rights to equitable remuneration have been neglected. As of 2017, the GVL has adopted the internationally recognised ISRC form of sound recording identification which enables the remuneration to be allocated on an individual recording much more precisely than before.

== Associates ==
Associates of the GVL are the Deutsche Orchestervereinigung e.V. (German Orchestra Association, short: DOV), Bundesverband Musikindustrie e.V. (Federal Association of the Music Industry; BVMI), Bundesverband Schauspiel e.V. (Federal Acting Association; BFFS) and the Verband unabhängiger Musikunternehmer*innen (Association of Independent Musicians and Music Companies; VUT).
