= VG Wort =

Verwertungsgesellschaft Wort (VG WORT, Collection Management Organisation VG WORT) is a Munich-based German copyright collective that administers copyright-related royalties. It was founded in February 1958 at the initiative of the Association of German Writers. Georg Kahn-Ackermann was one of the co-founders and later honorary president.

The organization's existence and activities are subject to German legislation (Section 22 of the German Civil Code, Section 1(4) of the Copyright Act), the Collecting Societies Act and are under the state supervision of the German Patent and Trade Mark Office (DPMA).

== See also ==
- GEMA
- GÜFA
