= C3S =

C3S may refer to:

- Alite, in cement chemist notation
- Chennai Centre for China Studies, an Indian think thank
- Copernicus Climate Change Service, science service
- Cultural Commons Collecting Society, music licensing organization
- Tricarbon monosulfide (C_{3}S), substance
