= David Pentecost =

British composer and writer (born 1940)

David Pentecost FBCS CITP
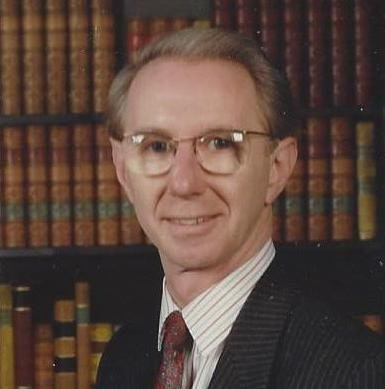
- Pentecost in 1988
- Born: 1940 (age 85–86); London, England
- Education: Christ's College, Finchley; Brunel College of Technology; London College of Music
- Occupations: Composer; Writer; Technology specialist; Programmer; British computer industry history researcher
- Years active: 1959–present

David John Pentecost (born 1940) is a British composer, videographer, writer, a retired information technology specialist, and a retired British computer industry history researcher. He is a Certified Information Technology Professional, a Life Member and Chartered Fellow of the British Computer Society, (Note: The British Computer Society certificates given to David Pentecost are reproduced in Pentecost's autobiography: Pentecost, David (2023). MY WORKING LIFE 3rd Edition, (see Bibliography section above), page 18-19. United Kingdom. ISBN 978-0-9518719-7-3) and also a Member of the Computer Conservation Society. (Note: The Computer Conservation Society's letter of authorisation is reproduced in Pentecost's autobiography: Pentecost, David (2020). MY WORKING LIFE The story of a 20th century computer programmer, page 87. United Kingdom. ISBN 978-0-951-87193-5)

== Early life and education ==
David Pentecost was born in London. He was educated privately in piano playing for seven years, from age 6, and on the violin for two years from age 9. He attended Christ's College, Finchley (a grammar school in north London), until age 18, and then studied mathematics at Brunel College of Technology. Pentecost passed three examinations at the London College of Music, up to Intermediate level. He then taught himself a large repertoire of classical piano music, during subsequent years.

== Significant information technology projects ==
=== Elliott Brothers (London) Ltd ===
1960 – 1962 Pentecost worked as a computer programmer (Note: The Elliott Brothers offer to David Pentecost is reproduced in Pentecost's autobiography: Pentecost, David (2020). MY WORKING LIFE The story of a 20th century computer programmer, page 8. United Kingdom. ISBN 978-0-951-87193-5) at computer manufacturer Elliott Brothers in Borehamwood, Hertfordshire – the first British company to become seriously involved with digital computer technology. Pentecost wrote software on the Elliott 405 computer to measure the precise execution time taken by another computer program running simultaneously on the same computer. The program's specification, program sheets and the program's paper tape were acquired from Pentecost by the Science Museum (London) in 2024 under Acquisition Reference 0001752, and are archived as object numbers 2024-716 and 2024–717; see External Links for Science Museum below. This software was used to demonstrate that Elliott's employee Tony Hoare’s new sorting techniques method Quicksort was faster than previous sorting techniques. (Note: Download the PDF file: the relevant section on comparative timings is the second paragraph on page 13.) The Quicksort method, or a version of it, now forms the basis of most computer sorting programs.

=== Mills Associates Ltd ===
In 1962, Pentecost moved to Mills Associates Ltd, (Note: The Mills Associates offer to David Pentecost is reproduced in Pentecost's autobiography: Pentecost, David (2020). MY WORKING LIFE The story of a 20th century computer programmer, page 29. United Kingdom. ISBN 978-0-951-87193-5) where he headed a small team of programmers to implement a unit trust administration system, believed to be the first of its kind. (Note: The article is reproduced in Pentecost's autobiography: Pentecost, David (2023). MY WORKING LIFE The story of a 20th century computer programmer, pages 34-36. United Kingdom. ISBN 978-0-951-87197-3)

=== Unit Trust Services Ltd ===
In 1967, Pentecost joined Unit Trust Services Ltd in the City of London, and in 1972 he was appointed as a director. (Note: The Unit Trust Services Ltd appointment to David Pentecost is reproduced in Pentecost's autobiography: Pentecost, David (2020). MY WORKING LIFE The story of a 20th century computer programmer, page 47. United Kingdom. ISBN 978-0-951-87193-5) He designed and implemented what was thought to be the first fully computerised unit trust contract note production system. He chose Honeywell’s new H316 industrial process control mini-computer, having persuaded Honeywell that it would be the first of its type to be used for commercial applications in the UK. (Note: The article is reproduced in Pentecost's autobiography: Pentecost, David (2020). MY WORKING LIFE The story of a 20th century computer programmer, page 46. United Kingdom. ISBN 978-0-951-87193-5) (Note: The article is reproduced in Pentecost's autobiography: Pentecost, David (2020). MY WORKING LIFE The story of a 20th century computer programmer, page 45. United Kingdom. ISBN 978-0-951-87193-5)

=== Coward Chance (later Clifford Chance) ===
In 1980, Pentecost joined Coward Chance as Business Systems Manager. In 1985 Pentecost designed and implemented a system on a large Burroughs Corporation mainframe computer, to revolutionise the administrative aspects of the office, replacing typewriters with word processors, all linked to the central computer, for accounting, billing and other purposes. The system was called the Office Automation System, and it incorporated an internal electronic mail system, before electronic mail over the Internet became widely available to the general public. (Note: The Office Automation System brochure, produced by Burroughs Corporation, is reproduced in Pentecost's autobiography: Pentecost, David (2020). MY WORKING LIFE The story of a 20th century computer programmer, pages 61–65. United Kingdom. ISBN 978-0-951-87193-5)

== Computer industry history research ==
In 2003, Pentecost learned that Simon Lavington, emeritus Professor of Computer Science at the University of Essex, was leading a project called Our Computer Heritage, to document the history of British computers for the Computer Conservation Society, whilst pioneers with the knowledge of these computers were still alive. The results of the project are now recorded on the website of the Computer Conservation Society. Pentecost offered, and was asked to lead part of the project, as co-ordinator for the Elliott 400 series of computers section of the website, and from 2003 to 2011 he collected information about the hardware, software and systems relating to these computers. One of his tasks was to find out about the Elliott 403 computer, which was also known as WREDAC. Only one had been built, in 1955, for the Government's Weapons Research Establishment, in Salisbury, South Australia, for the analysis of guided missile trials at Woomera. Simon Lavington referred to Pentecost's research on the 403 computer in two of his works.

Pentecost wrote an autobiography about his work in the computer industry, and included details of his research for the Computer Conservation Society's project to document early British computers. The Society regards his autobiography as a unique book, describing the complete working life experiences of a 20th-century computer programmer. The Archives of IT website also regards his autobiography worthy of inclusion in the Reminiscences section of its website

== Music career ==
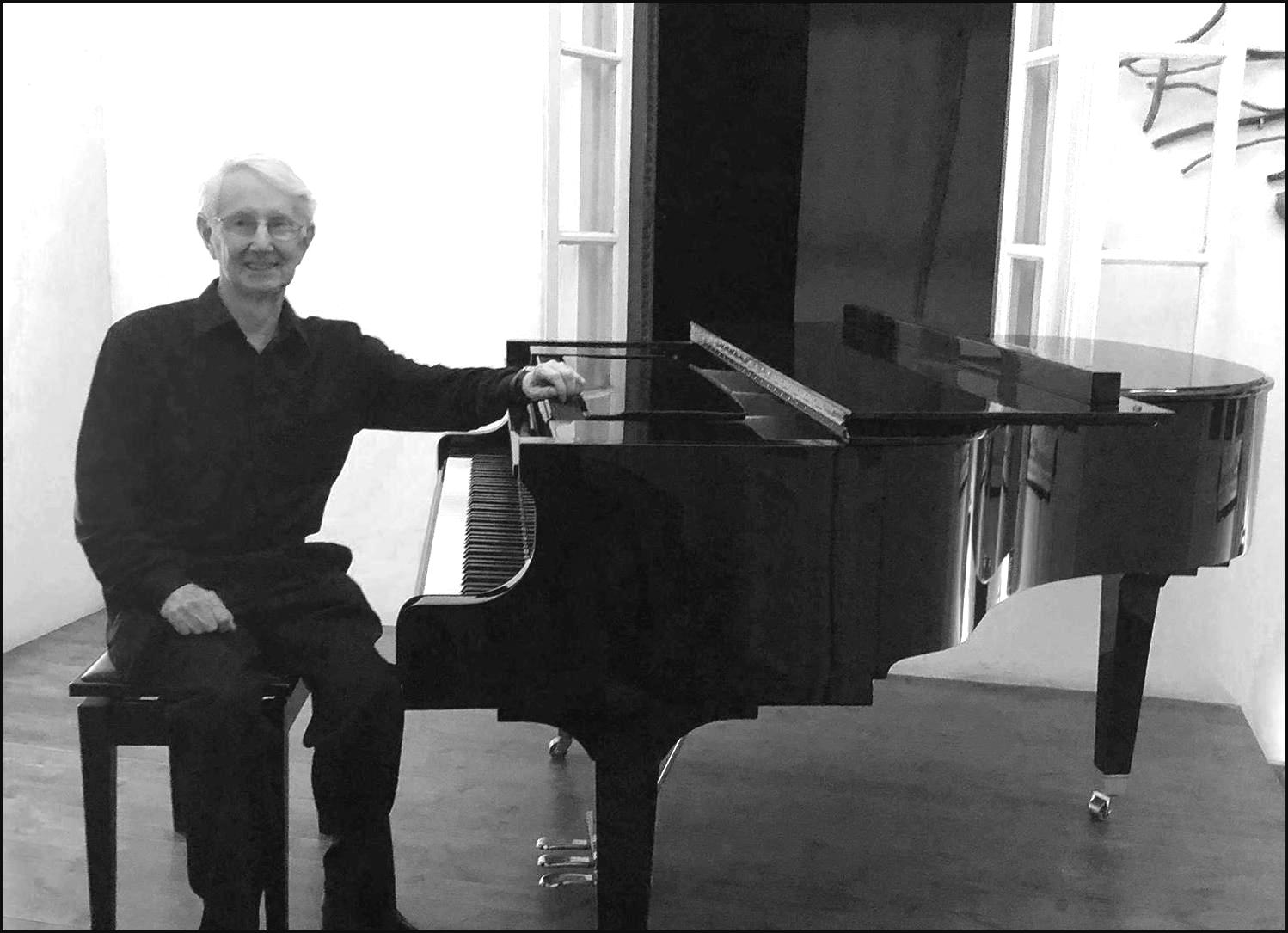
David Pentecost in 2018

In 1987 Pentecost took organ lessons from Catherine Ennis, at St Lawrence Jewry church, which led to his becoming, for a few years, one of the organists at St. Barnabas’ Church, in Linslade, Bedfordshire.

In 2001, he was accepted as a member of the Chopin Society in London. (Note: A photocopy of the list of new members is reproduced in Pentecost's autobiography: Pentecost, David (2023). My Life In Music, (4th edition) page 35. Cyprus. ISBN 978-9925-8045-1-1) From 2002 to 2005, before emigrating to Cyprus, he played at five of the Society's Members’ Matinée concerts, and included in his programmes a few of his early piano compositions; in 2023 he played some of his latest compositions at a sixth such concert. (Note: Pentecost's music programmes are reproduced in his autobiography: Pentecost, David (2023). My Life In Music, (4th edition) pages 37–42. Cyprus. ISBN 978-9925-8045-1-1)

From 2007 to 2011, after emigrating to Cyprus, Pentecost formed and organised two groups of amateur pianists in Cyprus, one in Paphos, the other in Limassol. They were called Pianists’ Circles and were based on similar principles to those of the Chopin Society's Members’ Matinée concerts. (Note: The newspaper article about Pentecost's Pianists’ Circles is reproduced in his autobiography: Pentecost, David (2023). My Life In Music, (4th edition) page 85. Cyprus. ISBN 978-9925-8045-1-1)

He began teaching himself to compose piano solo music in 1996, and he has continued this activity since then, as a professional composer. Russian pianist Tatiana Stupak played his Nocturne Op.18 at the Technopolis Cultural Centre in Paphos on 8 December 2017. He helped Tatiana Stupak with the administration of her concerts in Cyprus after she turned professional. Tatiana Stupak and another Russian pianist, Natalia Lezedova, played about twenty of his early piano works in Cyprus at a public concert in Paphos on 13 February 2018. Tatiana Stupak played one of his compositions at a concert on 12 June 2019 at the Cyprus’ Presidential Palace. Eight of his compositions were performed at a concert held on 12 May 2021 at the Rialto Theatre, Limassol. Eight of his compositions were performed at a concert at the Historical Museum of Serbia in Belgrade on 21 April 2022, by pianist Tatiana Stupak and violinist Olivera Rialas. His Opus 56, Poème, for violin and piano, was played at a concert ‘Music through the Ages’ at Kolossi Castle, in Cyprus, on 10 June 2022. The Polish pianist Wojciech Waleczek played Pentecost's Reverie, Op.6 at a Polish Independence Day recital in Larnaca, Cyprus, on 5 November 2022.

The Cyprus national broadcaster, Cyprus Broadcasting Corporation classical music radio station RIK 4 Classic, has played some of Tatiana Stupak's recordings of his compositions.

In 2015, Pentecost researched the life of the once world-famous Scottish pianist Frederic Lamond (pianist), who was a pupil of Franz Liszt, shortly before Liszt's death in 1886. As a result, he made a documentary video, intended for students of music history, about Lamond and his time spent with Liszt.

In 2018, Pentecost won first prize for composition at the 4th International Competition of Musicians in Cyprus. (Note: The diploma is reproduced in Pentecost's autobiography: Pentecost, David (2023). My Life In Music, (4th edition) page 82. Cyprus. ISBN 978-9925-8045-1-1)

Up to the end of 2025, he wrote 77 piano solo works, two for church organ, and two works for violin and piano. A CD of seventeen of his compositions was issued in 2021, by stupakrecords.com, 16 played by Tatiana Stupak, one played by himself, all of which he recorded and mastered. His music was generally not written in modern styles. His music is not atonal or minimalist. According to the sheet music published at sheetmusicplus.com, most of his works are in 19th century romantic styles, although a few works are in classical and baroque styles. In February 2025, he published the 5th and last edition of his 'My Life in Music' as an e-book - see Bibliography section below, and Notes k to n.

=== List of works ===
List of David Pentecost compositions(ISWC codes should be verifiable at https://iswcnet.cisac.org/search)(ISRC codes can be verified by clicking through to the ISRC database)
| Op. | Title | Comp. | Publ. | ISMN | ISWC | ISRC |
|---|---|---|---|---|---|---|
| 1 | Lullaby-Mazurka | 1996–99 | 2014 | ISMN 979-0-708013-01-3 | ISWC T-307.115.856-6 | |
| 2 | Mélodie Triste et en Colère | 1997–99 | 2014 | ISMN 979-0-708013-02-0 | ISWC T-307.116.249-3 | ISRC CYA2E2100006 |
| 3 | Rondo | 1997–99 | | ISMN 979-0-708013-03-7 | ISWC T-307.115.853-3 | |
| 4 | Fantasia | 1997–99 | 2014 | ISMN 979-0-708013-04-4 | ISWC T-307.116.246-0 | |
| 5 | Rondo-Scherzo | 1997–99 | | ISMN 979-0-708013-05-1 | ISWC T-307.115.851-1 | |
| 6 | Reverie | 2014 | 2014 | ISMN 979-0-708013-06-8 | ISWC T-300.521.403-5 | ISRC CYA2E2100005 |
| 7 | Waltz | 2008 | 2014 | ISMN 979-0-708013-07-5 | ISWC T-307.116.245-9 | |
| 8 | Song without Words | 2008 | 2014 | ISMN 979-0-708013-08-2 | ISWC T-309.888.836-5 | |
| 11 | Prelude | 2014 | 2014 | ISMN 979-0-708013-11-2 | ISWC T-307.115.846-4 | ISRC CYA2E2100011 |
| 12 | Etude | 2015 | 2020 | ISMN 979-0-708013-12-9 | ISWC T-923.240.641-6 | |
| 13 | Nocturne | 2015 | 2015 | ISMN 979-0-708013-13-6 | ISWC T-307.116.242-6 | ISRC CYA2F2400001 |
| 16 | Theme & Variations | 2016 | 2016 | ISMN 979-0-708013-16-7 | ISWC T-309.518.515-8 | |
| 17 | Etude | 2016 | 2016 | ISMN 979-0-708013-17-4 | ISWC T-923.685.207-6 | |
| 18 | Nocturne | 2016 | 2016 | ISMN 979-0-708013-18-1 | ISWC T-309.888.913-1 | ISRC CYA2E2100001 |
| 19 | Nocturne | 2016 | 2016 | ISMN 979-0-708013-19-8 | ISWC T-309.888.834-3 | ISRC CYA2E2100007 |
| 20 | (Printed book of Op.1 – Op.19) | 2016 | 2016 | ISMN 979-0-708013-20-4 | | |
| 21 | Prelude | 2017 | 2017 | ISMN 979-0-708013-21-1 | ISWC T-923.185.578-0 | |
| 22 | Fantasia | 2017 | 2017 | ISMN 979-0-708013-22-8 | ISWC T-923.185.576-8 | |
| 23 | Prelude | 2017 | 2017 | ISMN 979-0-708013-23-5 | ISWC T-309.888.909-5 | |
| 24 | Nocturne | 2017 | 2017 | ISMN 979-0-708013-24-2 | ISWC T-309.888.831-0 | ISRC CYA2E2100010 |
| 25 | Nocturne | 2017 | 2017 | ISMN 979-0-708013-25-9 | ISWC T-309.888.911-9 | ISRC CYA2E2100012 |
| 26 | Theme & Variations | 2017 | 2017 | ISMN 979-0-708013-26-6 | ISWC T-309.518.516-9 | |
| 27 | Prelude | 2018 | 2019 | ISMN 979-0-708013-27-3 | ISWC T-309.888.899-0 | |
| 28 | Impromptu Dance | 2019 | 2020 | ISMN 979-0-708013-28-0 | ISWC T-309.888.820-7 | ISRC CYA2E2100004 |
| 29 | Relaxation Video | 2019 | 2019 | ISMN 979-0-708013-29-7 | ISWC T-931.704.000-9 | ISRC CYA2F1900001 |
| 30 | Dreaming | 2019 | 2020 | ISMN 979-0-708013-30-3 | ISWC T-931.703.995-5 | |
| 31 | Prelude | 2019 | 2020 | ISMN 979-0-708013-31-0 | ISWC T-931.703.980-8 | |
| 32 | Petit Impromptu | 2019 | 2020 | ISMN 979-0-708013-32-7 | ISWC T-931.703.979-5 | ISRC CYA2E2100002 |
| 33 | St.Petersburg Waltz | 2019 | 2020 | ISMN 979-0-708013-33-4 | ISWC T-309.888.900-6 | ISRC CYA2E2100008 |
| 34 | Fantasia | 2019 | 2020 | ISMN 979-0-708013-34-1 | ISWC T-931.703.968-2 | |
| 35 | Waltz | 2019 | 2020 | ISMN 979-0-708013-35-8 | ISWC T-931.703.932-0 | |
| 36 | Prelude | 2019 | 2020 | ISMN 979-0-708013-36-5 | ISWC T-931.703.929-5 | |
| 37 | Nocturne | 2019 | 2020 | ISMN 979-0-708013-37-2 | ISWC T-309.888.825-2 | ISRC CYA2E2100014 |
| 38 | Impromptu | 2020 | 2020 | ISMN 979-0-708013-38-9 | ISWC T-309.888.822-9 | |
| 39 | Nocturne | 2020 | 2020 | ISMN 979-0-708013-39-6 | ISWC T-309.888.903-9 | ISRC CYA2E2100015 |
| 40 | Flowers in the Rain | 2020,22 | 2020 | ISMN 979-0-708013-40-2 | ISWC T-931.814.169-4 | ISRC CYA2F2000001 |
| 41 | Theme & Variations | 2015,20 | 2020 | ISMN 979-0-708013-41-9 | ISWC T-309.888.824-1 | |
| 42 | Etude | 2020 | 2020 | ISMN 979-0-708013-42-6 | ISWC T-932.510.954-4 | ISRC CYA2E2100003 |
| 43 | Nocturne | 2020 | 2020 | ISMN 979-0-708013-43-3 | ISWC T-309.888.904-0 | |
| 44 | Petit Nocturne | 2020 | 2020 | ISMN 979-0-708013-44-0 | ISWC T-932.510.968-0 | ISRC CYA2E2000001 |
| 45 | Mazurka | 2020,23 | 2020 | ISMN 979-0-708013-45-7 | ISWC T-932.510.973-7 | |
| 46 | Nocturne | 2020 | 2020 | ISMN 979-0-708013-46-4 | ISWC T-309.888.821-8 | ISRC CYA2F2100001 |
| 47 | Bagatelle | 2020 | 2020 | ISMN 979-0-708013-47-1 | ISWC T-932.544.687-5 | |
| 48 | Petite Valse | 2020 | 2020 | ISMN 979-0-708013-48-8 | ISWC T-309.888.914-2 | |
| 49 | Intermezzo | 2020 | 2020 | ISMN 979-0-708013-49-5 | ISWC T-300.289.319-4 | |
| 50 | Prelude | 2020 | 2020 | ISMN 979-0-708013-50-1 | ISWC T-300.521.546-9 | |
| 51 | Prelude | 2020 | 2020 | ISMN 979-0-708013-51-8 | ISWC T-301.128.144-6 | |
| 52 | Etude | 2020 | 2020 | ISMN 979-0-708013-52-5 | ISWC T-301.282.923-7 | |
| 53 | Impromptu | 2020 | 2020 | ISMN 979-0-708013-53-2 | ISWC T-309.888.816-1 | |
| 54 | Divertimento | 2020 | 2020 | ISMN 979-0-708013-54-9 | ISWC T-304.208.676-6 | ISRC CYA2E2100009 |
| 55 | Etude for the Sostenuto Pedal | 2020 | 2020 | ISMN 979-0-708013-55-6 | ISWC T-304.208.710-1 | ISRC CYA2E2100016 |
| 58 | Improvisation | 2021 | 2021 | ISMN 979-0-708013-58-7 | ISWC T-305.898.761-0 | |
| 59 | Waltz | 2021 | 2021 | ISMN 979-0-708013-59-4 | ISWC T-309.888.891-2 | |
| 60 | Waltz | 2022 | 2022 | ISMN 979-0-708013-60-0 | ISWC T-309.510.213-5 | |
| 61 | In Memoriam | 2021 | 2022 | ISMN 979-0-708013-61-7 | ISWC T-309.510.215-7 | |
| 62 | Improvisation | 2022 | 2022 | ISMN 979-0-708013-62-4 | ISWC T-311.354.038-4 | ISRC CYA2F2200004 |
| 63 | Waterfalls | 2022 | 2022 | ISMN 979-0-708013-63-1 | ISWC T-311.378.481-5 | ISRC CYA2F2200001 |
| 64 | Nocturne | 2022 | 2022 | ISMN 979-0-708013-64-8 | ISWC T-313.618.039-3 | |
| 65 | Nocturne | 2022 | 2022 | ISMN 979-0-708013-65-5 | ISWC T-313.553.719-4 | ISRC CYA2F2200002 |
| 66 | Prelude | 2022 | 2022 | ISMN 979-0-708013-66-2 | ISWC T-313.851.642-0 | ISRC CYA2F2200003 |
| 67 | Nocturne | 2023 | 2023 | ISMN 979-0-708013-67-9 | ISWC T-315.139.155-4 | |
| 68 | Nocturne | 2023 | 2023 | ISMN 979-0-708013-68-6 | ISWC T-315.574.331-6 | ISRC CYA2F2300001 |
| 69 | Prelude for Keyboard | 2022 | 2022,23 | ISMN 979-0-708013-69-3 | ISWC T-318.545.873-1 | ISRC CYA2F2200005 |
| 70 | Intermezzo | 2023 | 2023 | ISMN 979-0-708013-70-9 | ISWC T-322.158.228-7 | |
| 71 | Prelude | 2023 | 2023 | ISMN 979-0-708013-71-6 | ISWC T-322.789.999-8 | |
| 72 | Prelude | 2023 | 2023 | ISMN 979-0-708013-72-3 | ISWC T-322.789.935-2 | |
| 73 | Prelude for Organ | 2023 | 2023 | ISMN 979-0-708013-73-0 | ISWC T-322.789.963-6 | |
| 74 | Prelude | 2024 | 2024 | ISMN 979-0-708013-74-7 | ISWC T-323.070.071-3 | |
| 75 | Prelude | 2024 | 2024 | ISMN 979-0-708013-75-4 | ISWC T-323.070.078-0 | |
| 76 | Nocturne | 2024 | 2024 | ISMN 979-0-708013-76-1 | ISWC T-323.622.869-2 | |
| 77 | Prelude | 2024 | 2024 | ISMN 979-0-708013-77-8 | ISWC T-326.398.471-6 | |
| 78 | Prelude | 2024 | 2024 | ISMN 979-0-708013-78-5 | ISWC T-326.457.825-4 | |
| 79 | Prelude | 2025 | 2025 | ISMN 979-0-708013-79-2 | ISWC T-334.919.757-1 | |
| 80 | Intermezzo | 2025 | 2025 | ISMN 979-0-708013-80-8 | ISWC T-335.496.141-0 | |
| 81 | Prelude | 2025 | 2025 | ISMN 979-0-708013-81-5 | ISWC T-336.059.182-4 | |
| 82 | Etude | 2025 | 2025 | ISMN 979-0-708013-82-2 | ISWC T-336.689.809-7 | |
| 83 | Waltz | 2026 | 2026 | ISMN 979-0-708013-83-9 | ISWC T-307.116.245-9 | |
| 84 | Prelude | 2026 | 2026 | ISMN 979-0-708013-84-6 | ISWC T-340.617.552-4 | |
| 85 | Song Without Words | 2026 | 2026 | ISMN 979-0-708013-85-3 | ISWC T-340.967.404-6 | |
| 86 | Nocturne | 2026 | 2026 | ISMN 979-0-708013-86-0 | ISWC T-342.139.777-1 | |
| 87 | In the Clouds | 2026 | 2026 | ISMN 979-0-708013-87-7 | ISWC T-342.139.801-4 | |
| 98 | (Printed book of Op.1 – Op.55) | 2020 | 2020 | ISMN 979-0-708013-98-3 | | |

List of David Pentecost arrangements
| Op. | Title | Arr. | Publ. | ISMN | ISWC | ISRC |
|---|---|---|---|---|---|---|
| 9 | Prelude – J. S. Bach BWV855 | 2012 | 2014, 17,20 | ISMN 979-0-708013-09-9 | ISWC T-307.115.848-6 | ISRC CYA2E2100013 |
| 10 | A Chloris – Reynaldo Hahn | 2012 | 2014 | ISMN 979-0-708013-10-5 | ISWC T-307.116.243-7 | |
| 14 | Zueignung – R. Strauss | 2015 | 2015 | ISMN 979-0-708013-14-3 | ISWC T-926.500.041-7 | |
| 15 | Musetta's Waltz – Puccini | 2015 | 2015 | ISMN 979-0-708013-15-0 | ISWC T-307.115.863-5 | |
| 56 Ex Op.46 | Poème for Violin & Piano | 2021 | 2021 | ISMN 979-0-708013-56-3 | ISWC T-305.947.292-9 | |
| 57 Ex Op.18 | Nocturne for Violin & Piano | 2021 | 2021 | ISMN 979-0-708013-57-0 | ISWC T-305.947.272-5 | |

== Genealogy research projects ==
From about 1981 to 1991, he researched the history of his father's family, tracing it back in England to about 1480, and publishing a book. He became a member of the Society of Genealogists in London. He also researched for a few years up to 2014, the history of his mother's family and associated families, producing several books totalling more than 800 pages, which were distributed electronically privately to family members.

Part of this research led to his writing a local history book in 2021 about some properties in North Finchley in London. The book is “The History of Torrington Cottage, Finchley, and some neighbouring properties in Lodge Lane” (see the Bibliography section below). The book was accepted by The Finchley Society and is archived at Avenue House; see the External Links section below.

== Bibliography ==
- Pentecost, David (1991). The History of the Pentecost Family of Borehamwood. Leighton Buzzard: David Pentecost. ISBN 978-0-9518719-0-4.
- ——————— (2017). My Life in Music (1st ed.). Leighton Buzzard: David Pentecost. ISBN 978-0-9518719-2-8.
- ——————— (2020). My Working Life (PDF) (2nd ed.). Leighton Buzzard: David Pentecost. ISBN 978-0-9518719-3-5.
- ——————— (2020). My Life in Music (2nd ed.). Leighton Buzzard: David Pentecost. ISBN 978-0-9518719-4-2.
- ——————— (2021). The History of Torrington Cottage, Finchley. Leighton Buzzard: David Pentecost. ISBN 978-0-9518719-5-9.
- ——————— (2022). My Life in Music (3rd ed.). Leighton Buzzard: David Pentecost. ISBN 978-0-9518719-6-6.
- ——————— (2023). My Working Life (3rd ed.). Leighton Buzzard: David Pentecost. ISBN 978-0-9518719-7-3.
- ——————— (2023). My Life in Music (4th ed.). Limassol: David Pentecost. ISBN 978-9925-8045-1-1.
- ——————— (2025). My Life in Music (5th - e-book ed.). Limassol: David Pentecost. ISBN 978-9925-8045-3-5.
