= Central Office for Private Transfer Rights =

The Central Office for Private Transfer Rights (in German: Zentralstelle für private Überspielungsrechte, abbreviated ZPÜ) is an amalgamation of Nine German Copyright Collection Societies GEMA, GÜFA, GVL, GWFF, TWF, VFF, VGF, VG Picture Art and VG World. Its legal form is that of a Company under civil law based in Munich. Its function is to centrally assert the copyright compensation claims of the collecting societies involved in the reproduction of audio works and audiovisual works for private and other personal use and then to distribute the proceeds to the collecting societies. In 2017, the total distribution was around 575 million euros. New private copying levies agreed to by German trade association Bitkom and ZPÜ in December 2015 likely caused Apple to slightly raise the price of its iPhone and iPad prices in Germany on 1 January, 2016. In 2018 the GVL benefited from back payments and adjustments in the private copying sector in the previous years ZPÜ with the GVL paying out a total of €287 million ($326 million) to producers and artists in 2018, using a new system for distributions.

== Background ==
The Copyright Act (UrhG) provides for legal licenses for certain acts of use. This means that, under certain circumstances, the use of a work is permissible without the permission of the rights holder, but the legislature in return grants the rights holder a right to remuneration. One of the most important legal remuneration claims results from the so-called freedom of private copying: According to § 53 UrhG, works can be reproduced (i.e. copied, scanned, recorded, etc.) for private and other personal use. The remuneration for private copying is not charged directly to the copier; this would also be practically impossible. Instead, the author has a claim for remuneration against all manufacturers and importers of devices and storage media that are suitable for making such reproductions (Section 54 (1) UrhG). The claim cannot be exercised directly by the individual rights holder themselves, but exclusively by collecting societies (Section 54h (1) UrhG).

== Copyright Collection Society definition ==
The ZPÜ was not itself a Copyright Collection Society within the meaning of Section 2 of the Collecting Societies Act (VGG). While this resulted in an extensive exemption from the special regulations for collecting societies at the time of the Copyright Administration Act, the ZPÜ has been largely subject to this as a so-called dependent collecting organization since the Collecting Societies Act came into force in 2016 and in this role is subject to official supervision by the German Patent and Trademark Office.
