= Kathi Stimmer-Salzeder =

German Gospel singer (born 1957)

Kathi Stimmer-Salzeder (born 1957) is a German gospel singer-songwriter known for her melody, Gloria, Ehre sei Gott.

== Life ==
Kathi Stimmer-Salzeder grew up with four siblings in a religious family. Her music-loving parents Kathi and Otto Stimmer encouraged her musical talent and taught her the flute, guitar and piano, among other things. While mainly folk music was played at home, she came into contact with New Spiritual Song at the English Misses boarding school in Altötting. She wrote her first song in this genre at the age of 13.

After leaving school, she studied to become a teacher for primary and secondary schools in Munich, specialising in music and religion. She has been married to Matthias Salzeder since 1980 and lives with her family in their hometown. While bringing up her three children (born 1984, 1986, 1987), the composer set up her publishing house Musik und Wort, through which she sells CDs and sheet music with her songs.

While at school in Altötting, Kathi Stimmer-Salzeder founded the Aschauer Rhythmusgruppe in 1973 – the first ensemble in which her songs were publicised. The group organised youth, pilgrimage and festival services. During the 25-year existence of the Aschauer Rhythmusgruppe, the composer's songs spread to concert halls and churches, particularly in German-speaking countries. Some of her songs have found their way into the hymnals of Christian churches. Her compositional oeuvre to date comprises around 500 songs and instrumental pieces.

Since 1998, Stimmer-Salzeder has been bringing her musical works to the stage with the Aschauer Stimm-Kreis and organising church services and workshops. She also directs the Aschau Children's Choir and gives instrumental lessons for children.

When composing her songs, she aims to create music that can be played by many. Therefore, all her works are free of GEMA fees.

== Works ==
- Aus der Wurzel
- Das Saatkorn sieht die Ähre nicht
- Daß die Sonne jeden Tag
- Deine Gnade hast du auf mich gelegt
- Die Sonne glüht immer
- Dieses Leben haben
- Du bist im Lachen
- Du für mich
- Du wirst den Tod in uns wandeln in Licht
- Ehre sei Dir, unserm Gott
- Frieden wünsch' ich dir (2000)
- Gehn oder stehn (1991)
- Geist wie Feuer
- Gloria, Ehre sei Gott (2008)
- Hast du heute schon gelacht
- Heilig, heilig, heilig (1984)
- Herr, bleib bei uns, sei unser Licht
- Herr, schenke uns dein Licht
- Ich bin der Weinstock
- Ich will dir danken, Gott
- In Bethlehem ganz unbequem
- Komm herein und nimm dir zeit für dich
- Lebt euer Leben mit Gott
- Mach dich auf
- Mit dir geh ich alle meine Wege (1998)
- Schau mich an mit den Augen deines Herzens
- Schenk uns Gedanken der Stille
- Sei Du bei mir
- Singt Gott, jubelt ihm
- Unsres Herzens Stimme
- Von der Freude
- Wag den Weg
- Welche Wärme
- Wenn jemand in Christus ist
- Wenn wir unsre Gaben bringen (1980)
