= Blocking of YouTube videos in Germany =

Censorship in Germany of YouTube videos containing copyrighted music

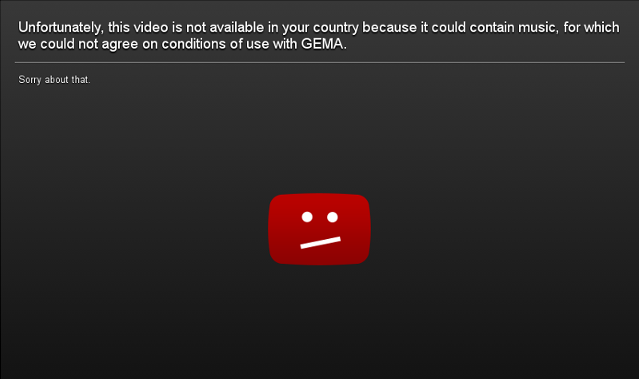
YouTube displaying the error message in English…

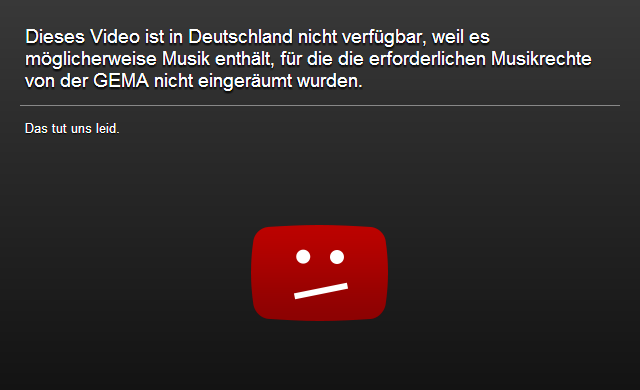
…and in German

The blocking of YouTube videos in Germany was part of a former dispute between the video sharing platform YouTube and the Gesellschaft für musikalische Aufführungs- und mechanische Vervielfältigungsrechte (GEMA, or "Society for Musical Performance and Mechanical Reproduction Rights" in English), a performance rights organization in Germany.

According to a German court in Hamburg, Google's subsidiary YouTube could be held liable for damages when it hosts copyrighted videos without the copyright holder's permission. As a result, music videos for major label artists on YouTube, as well as many videos containing background music, have been geoblocked in Germany since the end of March 2009 after the previous agreement had expired and negotiations for a new license agreement were stopped. On 30 June 2015, Google won a partial victory against GEMA in a state court in Munich, which ruled that they could not be held liable for such damages.

In July 2015, the higher regional court of Hamburg also rejected GEMA's claim for €1.6 million in damages.

In 2016, YouTube and GEMA, who represents 70,000 composers and publishers, reached a settlement agreement. The settlement sum is unknown.

== Background ==
According to Google, GEMA sought to raise its fee charged to YouTube to a "prohibitive" 12 Eurocent per streamed video—a claim that is disputed by GEMA spokesperson Bettina Müller stating their proposal was 1 Eurocent only plus a breakdown by composer. The issue is set to be taken up by a California court. Google, the world's biggest Internet search engine company, partly lost a German copyright infringement suit over how much it must do to remove illegal music videos from its YouTube website.

A study sponsored by the video hosting website MyVideo estimated that 61.5% of the 1000 most viewed YouTube clips are blocked in Germany. This is significantly higher than, for example, in the United States (0.9%) or in Switzerland (1.2%).

Another study found that around 3% of all YouTube videos, and 10% of those videos with over a million views, are blocked in Germany.

== Effects ==
Sony Music's CEO of international business, Edgar Berger, said in an interview in February 2012 that the Internet is a blessing for the music industry. Nevertheless, there are still problems that have to be overcome, such as restrictive copyright enforcement by music rights collecting agencies. Berger claims that YouTube revenue running into the millions is being lost because GEMA's policies prevent artist's videos from being shown online in the country.

Conversely, it can be questioned how much of this lost revenue would have actually benefitted GEMA members, given that licensing agreements in other territories are subject to a confidentiality agreement that prevents even the membership of the collecting societies from knowing the royalty rates.

An academic study by Tobias Kretschmer and Christian Peukert published in 2020 shows that the blocking of music videos decreased recorded music sales in Germany by about 5%–10%. The effect is much stronger (more negative) for newcomer artists, and less strong (less negative) for mainstream artists. Also, German artists suffered relatively less from the YouTube blackout and gained market share as a result.

== Reception ==
GEMA's stance has elicited considerable criticism from Google and foreign record companies.

Edgar Berger, CEO of Sony Music Entertainment in Munich, told Billboard: "I suspect that some members of GEMA's supervisory board have not yet arrived in the digital era. We want to see streaming services like VEVO and Spotify in the German market. Spotify must not be blocked by GEMA any longer. Artists and music companies are losing sales in the millions".

Google spokesman Kay Oberbeck told Billboard in Hamburg that YouTube had entered into 20 agreements with collection societies from 33 countries. "We therefore regret all the more that GEMA has decided to commence legal proceedings against us despite the promising talks which we have held, thus removing the basis for conducting any further negotiations in a spirit of mutual trust. A solution can only be found at the negotiating table without any legal proceedings. We are prepared to resume negotiations at any time."

Frank Briegmann, President of Universal Music Germany, has described Germany as "a developing country in the digital music market. GEMA apparently has not yet understood the new developments in the international music market".

== Agreement ==
On 31 October 2016, GEMA released a press statement stating that YouTube will pay GEMA for video views of GEMA-protected artists. No further details regarding payment were disclosed.
