= Korea Popmusic Industry Association =

South Korean music industry association

- 한국대종음악산업협회
- Abbreviation: KPIA
- Formation: December 9, 2008; 17 years ago
- Type: Non-profit association
- Website: http://www.k-mca.or.kr/
- Formerly called: Korea Music Content Association (KMCA)

The Korea Popmusic Industry Association (Korean: 한국대종음악산업협회; KPIA), formerly known as the Korea Music Content Association (Korean: 한국음악콘텐츠협회; KMCA), is a non‐profit organization representing major music content producers and distributors in South Korea.

== History ==
The KMCA was established on December 9, 2008, and registered with the Ministry of Culture, Sports and Tourism. In February 2010, the KMCA launched the national music chart, now known as the Circle Chart. On December 29, 2016, the organization changed its name from the Korea Music Content Industry Association to its current name. In 2018, it introduced a certification system for music recordings and album sales in South Korea. On July 7, 2022, the KMCA joined the International Federation of the Phonographic Industry (IFPI) and was designated as the official registration agency for International Standard Recording Codes (ISRC) in South Korea. On April 1, 2026, the KMCA was rebranded as the KPIA.

== See also ==
- Circle Chart
