= Heker =

Heker is a surname. Notable people with the surname include:

- Harald Heker (born 1958), German chief executive
- Liliana Heker (born 1943), Argentine writer

== See also ==
- Eker (surname)
- Hecker (surname)
