= Liner notes =

Liner copy

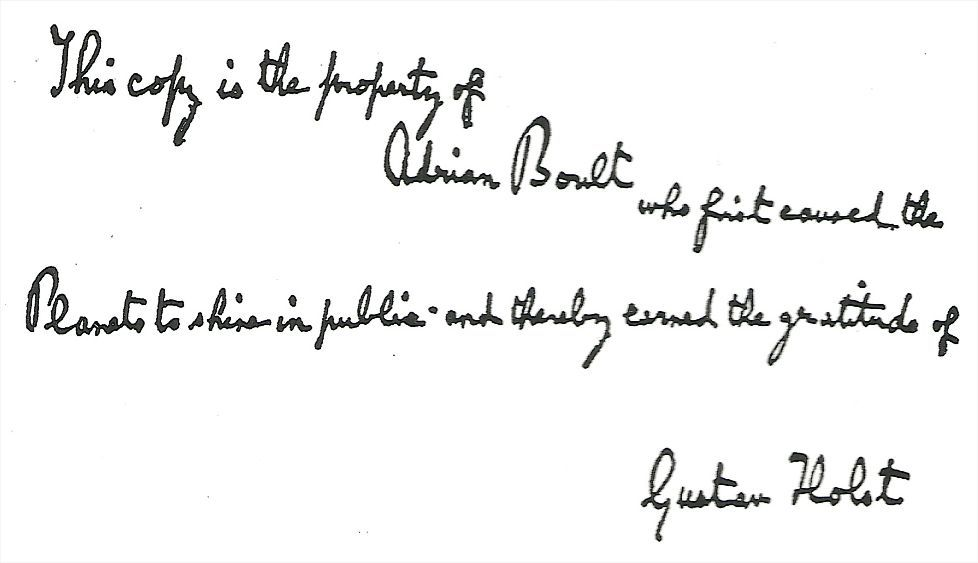
Handwritten inscription by Gustav Holst on Adrian Boult's copy of the score of The Planets (from liner note to EMI CD 5 66934 2)

Liner notes (also sleeve notes or album notes) are the writings found on the sleeves of LP record albums and in booklets that come inserted into the compact disc jewel case or cassette j-cards.

== Origin ==
Liner notes are descended from the program notes for musical concerts and developed into notes that were printed on the outer album jacket or the inner sleeve used to protect a traditional 12-inch vinyl record, i.e., long playing or gramophone record album. The term descends from the name "record liner" or "album liner". Album liner notes survived format changes from vinyl LP to cassette to CD. These notes can be sources of information about the contents of the recording as well as broader cultural topics.

== Contents ==
=== Common material ===
Such notes often contained a mix of factual and anecdotal material, and occasionally a discography for the artist or the issuing record label. Liner notes were also an occasion for thoughtful signed essays on the artist by another party, often a sympathetic music journalist, a custom that has largely died out. However, the liner note essay has survived in reissues and retrospective compilations, particularly in box sets. It is also a tradition in Japan, especially for foreign artist releases. Liner notes often include complete song lyrics for the album.

=== Biographies ===
Beginning approximately in the 1960's owing to the rise of the LP record, liner notes usually include information about the musician, lyrics, a personnel list, and other credits to people the musicians want to thank and people or companies involved in the production of the music. They also can give details on the extent of each musical piece, and sometimes place them in historical or social context. Liner notes for classical music recordings often provide information in several languages; if the piece includes vocal parts, they will often include a libretto, possibly also translated into several languages.

=== Label copy ===
The factual information in liner notes comes from the label copy. Label copy is the record label's official info sheet for the published release. It contains information that accompanies a musical work, including artist name, song title, song length, ISRC code, catalogue number, composer, publisher, rights holder, technical and artistic credits, A&R and producer credits, recording dates and locations. In digital music, the label copy is contained within what's known as metadata.

=== Metadata ===
Liner notes sometimes provide metadata that can help when cataloguing private or public collections of sound recordings. However, the information provided on liner notes varies considerably depending on the studio or label which produced the record. It also varies how much of the metadata digital media services such as Spotify and iTunes make public. In 2018, Tidal launched official music credits supplied by distributors across their database of 90 million recordings. In 2019 Australian company Jaxsta launched a database of official music credits and liner notes. The database is made up of content-owner supplied metadata rather than crowd-sourced data, making previous hidden metadata more widely available to the music industry as well as the public domain. In 2019, French company Qobuz launched official music credits and digital liner notes booklets appearing in the player. Pandora also launched full credits within their player in 2019. Metadata credits are sent from official sources to all databases and streaming services using the DDEX ERN standard, however not all services display this data to the consumer.

== Digital liner notes ==
Increasingly and due to the rise of digital downloads, a digital booklet is being introduced to compensate for the lack of a physical booklet. Apple Inc. also introduced iTunes LP which features interactive menus instead of simple pages. Spotify also has songwriter and producer credits available for individual tracks. Lyrics are also available on certain tracks, in collaboration with Genius. As of 2020, it was estimated that up to 94% of recordings are now supplying the official music credits feed direct from the owners of the data to streaming services such as Spotify, Amazon, Google, Tidal, Pandora, Qobuz and more, as well as databases such as Gracenote, but not all services are displaying the data they are sent at this stage.

== Awards ==
A Grammy Award for Best Album Notes has been given annually since the 6th Annual Grammy Awards, 12 May 1964.
