= Gloria, Ehre sei Gott =

Christian hymn

- Christian hymn
- Written: 1992
- Text: by Kathi Stimmer-Salzeder
- Language: German
- Melody: by Kathi Stimmer-Salzeder

"Gloria, Ehre sei Gott" (Glory to God) is a Christian hymn in German, with text and music written in 1992 by Kathi Stimmer-Salzeder. It appears in the common Catholic hymnal in German, Gotteslob.

== History ==
The singer-songwriter Kathi Stimmer-Salzeder wrote both text and music of "Gloria, Ehre sei Gott" in 1992, as a paraphrase of the liturgical Gloria. It is contained in the Gotteslob, the common Catholic hymnal in German, as GL 169. It is also part of other hymnals and songbooks.
