= Photograph copyright (Germany) =

In Germany, photo rights or "Bildrechte" are the copyrights that are attached to the "author" of the photograph and are specified in the "Law for Copyright and similar Protection" ("Gesetz über Urheberrecht und verwandte Schutzrechte"). These rights deal with rights of reproduction, distribution, modification, attribution, and prohibitions against illegal modification or reproduction. The ownership rights of a picture are treated under the broader "art copyright laws". Furthermore, if a museum or gallery owns a work of art or a photograph, they are permitted to make their own stipulations as to the selling of illustrations and reproductions of their property. This relates to the German legal concept of the right of owner to undisturbed possession. Wolf Vostell said: "Copyrights are like human rights".

== Periods of protection ==
=== Photographs (Lichtbilder) ===
According to § 72 Abs. 3 UrhG, copyrights for most photographs and pictures expire fifty years after their first publication. If the picture is not published for a period of 50 years after production of the photograph, then the protection ends. As long as the work appears at least once in that period, the period of protection is extended until 50 years after its first publication. For example, if a photo is taken in the year 2000 but is not published until 2049, the protection will be extended until 2099.

=== Photographic works (Lichtbildwerke) ===
Initially, family, vacation, and other photographs taken spontaneously by individuals and not necessarily intended for publication were not treated as "photographs" for the purposes of copyright. Today, these are termed "photographic works" and are protected by copyright provided that they are the author's "own intellectual creations" (§ 2 UrhG). The copyright of a "photographic work" expires seventy years after the author's death (§2 64 UrhG).

=== Photos as documents of contemporary history ===
European Union law eliminated the concept of "historical photos" on 1 July 1995.

== Protection of reproductions ==
As in most countries, to reproduce a copyright protected photo, the permission of the copyright owner must be obtained, and in some cases royalties paid. The law on reproduction of public domain images varies with the type of material.

=== Two-dimensional originals ===
It is generally agreed that a mechanical copy, e.g. a photocopy), by digitizing (as with a scanner) as well as the reproduction of public-domain typographic originals (books, documents, etc.) and photos of public-domain originals (a picture from a picture) do not create a claim of ownership. In 1989, the then West German Bundesgerichtshof (supreme court) judged that identical reproductions, as described above, cannot be protected by copyright.

The Oberlandesgericht Düsseldorf decided in 1996 that photographic reproductions, issued as postcards showing the works of Joseph Beuys, were not to be used as templates for digitization. Photographing two-dimensional templates in itself does not constitute an "artistic work", but sound and specialist methods used to do so does. A protective period due to § 72 UrhG for up to 50 years after the first publishing was issued.

This decision contradicted the opinion of the Supreme Court, which was affirmed again in 2000 in a judgement of 7 December 2000, Telefonkarte (calling card), (Az. I ZR 146/98):

"[...] Independently thereof, the picture, for which the plaintiff claims the protection of § 72 UrhG, would have to be more it's than a bare technical reproduction of an existing graphics. Because the technical reproduction procedure alone does not justify a photo protection (see BGH, judgement from 8 November 1989 – I ZR 14/88, GRUR 1990, 669, 673 – Bible reproduction, m.w. N.; Schricker/Vogel, copyright, 2. Aufl., § 72 UrhG Rdn. 22). Rather, a minimum of personal mental performance is necessary, which is to be denied if a photo or a similarly manufactured product is not any more than the bare technical reproduction of an existing representation."

In the United States, a Federal court decided, in its 1999 case Bridgeman Art Library vs. Corel Corporation, that original, faithful photographs of paintings were not copyrightable, since the originality is missing. (United States District Court for the Southern District of New York, 18 February 1999). The software producer Corel Corp. had used slides of the Bridgeman Art Library for the picture collection of its own CD-ROM.

If a raw photograph and/or reproduction of a public-domain original is published in a book, then the predominant jurisdiction assumes this illustration can be reproduced at will, without agreement of the photographer and the publishing house.

=== Three-dimensional motives ===
The photography of three-dimensional motifs always creates a photo (or sometimes also a photo work), which is protected under copyright law. This derives from the creative process, as the photographer must select a location, lighting, etc...

== International agreements ==
The revised Bern agreement copyright applies (RBUe) (BGBl. 1973 II S. 1071, 1985 II S. 81), originally the Bernese agreement, to the protection of works of literature and art from 9 September 1886. The agreement requires generally at least a 50-year period of protection for works from the death of the author, as well as at least 25 years for photographic works (art. 7 Abs. 4 RBUe) as a minimum standard for the national legislation. This applies to publications of a German work outside of Germany.

Beyond that there is the international copyright agreement from 6 September 1952 (BGBl. part of II/1955, S. 101 FF.) revised on 24 July 1971 in Paris (BGBl. part of II/1973, S. 1111 FF). This is enforceable through INTERPOL.

== See also ==
- Copyright law of Germany
