= Labelcode =

Unique four- or five-digit number used to identify record labels

Labelcode illustration example

Labelcode also known as Label Code is a unique 4 to 6-digit music label identification code that is assigned by Gesellschaft zur Verwertung von Leistungsschutzrechten (GVL), Germany. Since 2017, Labelcode is no longer mandatory. Labelcode is still used in some occasions, for example, CD publishing.

== Ways to get a Labelcode ==
A Labelcode is only issued by GVL after it has been published for the first time. However, there are several ways to get an LC.

1. The simplest is the way described below: Takeover of the LC of the press shop (keyword: assignment of ancillary rights).
2. After pressing a CD, for example, an application for an LC including a copy of the recordings is sent to GVL. After processing and issuing the LC, the GVL sends the sticker with the LC to the applicant. Only from the second production onwards can the LC be used permanently.
3. In consultation with the GVL, members of the Association of German Musicians (VDM) can receive their own label code via the VDM. This is also possible before pressing a CD for the first time.
4. If you don't want to create your own label, but need an LC to publish the song and you are a member of the "German Rock and Pop Musicians' Association" (www.drmv.de), they can claim the possibility of using the LC 08248 from the in-house Rockwerk Records immediately. In return, Rockwerk Records retains the GVL royalties recorded upon publication and forwards them to the DRMV, which uses them for its statutory activities. The DRMV member must forego GVL income in this regard. Source: DRMV license agreement for the label code.
5. If the first publication of a label should have a circulation of at least 3,000 physical media, GVL will issue a provisional label code. Prerequisite is the submission of the order confirmation from the press shop. The publication then printed with the provisional LC is subsequently submitted to GVL as a specimen copy.

== Usage ==
Labelcode was created by GVL on May 1, 1976, and introduced by IFPI in 1977 in order to unmistakably identify the different record labels. The number of countries using the Labelcode is limited (it is mostly used in Germany), and the code given on the item is not always accurate to the label on which the album or single was actually released. As of 2017, the Gesellschaft zur Verwertung von Leistungsschutzrechten (GVL) have adopted the internationally recognised ISRC form of sound recording identification which enables the remuneration to be allocated much more precisely than before.

== Code format ==
Labelcodes should not be confused with catalog numbers.

It is on the form of LC-12345 or LC-100405. Labelcodes were originally 4-digits long, but when the 5-digits were introduced, a zero was prepended to the old codes. LC-2345 and LC-02345 and therefore the same code. For the newer 6-digit codes, a zero was not prefixed to the existing codes. LC-01303 and LC-101303 are both valid, but reference a different label.

A full list of Labelcodes can be found on the GVL Label Recherche website.
