= Phonographic Performance Limited =

British music licensing company

PPL
- Phonographic Performance Limited
- Founded: 12 May 1934
- Founder: Decca Records, EMI
- Merger of: Association of United Recording Artists (AURA) and the Performing Artists' Media Rights Association Ltd (PAMRA) into Phonographic Performance Ltd (PPL) in 2006
- Type: Private company limited by guarantee
- Location: London, United Kingdom
- Region served: International
- Services: Music Copyright Collective
- Revenue: £272.6 Million (2022)
- Website: ppluk.com

Phonographic Performance Limited (PPL) is a British music copyright collective. It is a private limited company that is registered in the UK. PPL was founded by Decca Records and EMI and incorporated on 12 May 1934, and undertakes collective rights management of sound recordings on behalf of its record-company members, and distributes the fees collected to both its record company (rights holder) members and performer members. As of 2022, PPL collected royalties for over 140,000 performers and recording rightsholders.

PPL continues to be owned by record companies, which it refers to as "rights holders", who are legally the only "members" and the only ones entitled to attend the annual general meeting. In 2023, PPL announced its 2022 financial results, revealing £272.6 million was collected that year, an increase of 7.8% on 2018, and that growth was achieved across broadcast and public performance revenue, but international revenue had decreased from 2021. PPL is a member of the British Copyright Council (BCC).

After administration costs and contributions to anti-piracy activities and music industry charities—all of which are agreed by the membership at the AGM—all revenue generated from PPL licence fees is passed onto its registered record company and performer members as royalties for the use of their recorded music. PPL members range from session musicians and emerging artists to major record labels and globally successful performers. It is free to join PPL as a member.

PPL's field of operation is distinct from the UK's other main music copyright collective previously known as the "Performing Right Society", now called PRS for Music, which was founded in 1914 and originally collected fees for live performance of sheet music.

As of 2018, PRS has entered a joint venture with PPL under a Leicester-based private company called PPL PRS Ltd, which aims to make it easier for their customers to obtain a music licence, which they have called "TheMusicLicence".

PPL's CEO is Peter Leathem OBE. Leathem was awarded the OBE for services to the music industry in the Kings 2023 New Years Honours List.

== History ==
=== Founding and early history (1934–1956) ===
PPL was formed in May 1934 by the record companies EMI and Decca Records, following a court case against Bristol coffee shop Stephen Carwardine & Co, which had been entertaining its customers by playing records. EMI, then called The Gramophone Company, argued it was against the law to play the record in public without first receiving the permission of the copyright owners. The judge agreed, establishing this as a legal principle. EMI and Decca formed Phonographic Performance Ltd (PPL) to carry out this licensing role, and opened the first office in London.

The Copyright Act 1956 led to the expansion of PPL's role to also cover the licensing of broadcasters that played recorded music. Further copyright law changes in 1988 strengthened PPL's licensing position.

=== Performers' right to equitable remuneration (1996) ===
In 1996, performers were given the right to receive "equitable remuneration" where recordings of their performances were played in public or broadcast and until 2006, these rights were collected for performers by Performing Artists' Media Rights Association Ltd (PAMRA) and Association of United Recording Artists (AURA) for non-featured and featured performers respectively. Article 15 of the WPPT reads; "Performers and producers of phonograms shall enjoy the right to a single equitable remuneration for the direct or indirect use of phonograms published for commercial purposes for broadcasting or for any communication to the public". When performers were granted the right to equitable remuneration through legislation, streaming services such as YouTube, Spotify and Apple Music did not exist and there is still no statutory right to remuneration for artist and performers when their performances are exploited by streaming services. Unlike its German counterpart GVL, PPL do not collect Secondary Exploitation Rights for performers; in the UK this is currently within the remit of the Musicians Union.

=== Mergers (2006) ===
Performer organisations PAMRA and AURA merged with PPL in November 2006, leading to an annual meeting and dedicated board specifically for performers. Performers had no rights until the right to equitable remuneration was brought in to law in 1996, at which point PAMRA and AURA came into being; PAMRA collecting for non-featured performers and AURA for featured ones.

=== Joint venture (2016) ===
PPL PRS Ltd is a private limited company incorporated in the UK on 14 September 2016. It is equally owned by PPL and PRS with an initial shareholding allocation of one ordinary share to each party, creating one music copyright collective organisation in the UK that is responsible for licensing music and collection of fees. The company's stated aim is to provide the best music licensing experience in the world.

== International agreements ==
PPL has international agreements, sometimes referred to as "Reciprocal Deals", with 95 music copyright collection societies, including Phonographic Performance Company of Australia (PPCA) in Australia, Gesellschaft zur Verwertung von Leistungsschutzrechten GmbH (GVL) in Germany, and AARC, AFM & SAG-AFTRA, and SoundExchange (P & R) in the US. The territories and societies that PPL currently hold agreements with do not all offer representation of performers; some offer representation to both rights-holders and performers and some only offer representation for rights holders.

PPL is one of 44 ordinary members of the Societies’ Council for the Collective Management of Performers’ Rights (SCAPR), which was founded in 1986 and is based in Brussels, Belgium. It operates as an international platform for the development of the practical cooperation between copyright collection societies that represent performers. Other ordinary members include GVL (Germany), SENA (The Netherlands), ADAMI (France) and RAAP (Ireland). Associate Members include ARCC (US) and SAMPRA (South Africa).

== Playing music in public ==
=== Music licensing for business ===
Any business that plays recorded music within PPL's repertoire in public, such as a shop, bar, office, restaurant, gym, community building, not-for-profit organisation; or for activities such as dance classes, needs to have a PPL licence. Exceptions are hotels, guest houses and bed and breakfast accommodation that have fewer than 25 rooms and have no areas that are open to non-residents, such as a bar or restaurant.

A PPL licence is required when recorded music, within PPL's repertoire, including radio and television, is played in public. There is no statutory definition of "playing in public" and "public performance" but the UK courts have given guidance on its meaning and ruled that it means any playing of music outside of a domestic setting, for example at a workplace, public event or in the course of any business activities. No licence is required for listening on headphones. The playing of recorded music as part of domestic home life, or when the audience consists entirely of friends and/or family does not require a PPL licence.

A PPL licence gives the licence holder permission to play recorded music from PPL's repertoire; the vast majority of commercially released music in the UK. Playing music that is outside of its copyright term or that is freely licensed does not require a PPL licence.

In 2018 PPL and PRS for Music joined forces to streamline music licensing for businesses, coming together to launch PPL PRS Ltd.

=== Music licensing for radio broadcasting ===
PPL licenses radio stations based in the UK, Isle of Man and Channel Islands to use recorded music within its repertoire in all forms of radio, from traditional FM/AM broadcasting to satellite and online streaming.

=== Music licensing for television broadcasting ===
With the relevant PPL music licence, broadcasters can use recorded music within PPL's repertoire and/or music videos in their programming with the permission of the performer and copyright owner. Applications for music licences can be made online.

== Membership ==
=== Record company members ===
Anyone who owns or holds an exclusive licence to the rights for recorded music that is broadcast or played in public in the UK can join PPL as a recording rights-holder member. This can include major record labels, independent labels, self-releasing artists or companies that have purchased the relevant rights.

=== Performer members ===
Anyone who has performed on recorded music can join PPL as a performer member. If an audible contribution has been made to a recorded music track, the performer could be eligible for royalties. This includes lead singers, choir members and musicians who have contributed to a recording, and could be eligible for PPL royalties. Inaudible contributions such as a conductor are also eligible.

The equitable remuneration percentage paid to performers varies as defined in PPL UK Distribution Rules, Schedule 5: Performer Allocation Rules with featured performers receiving the largest share and non-featured a smaller share. The percentage allocation process is complex and dependent on a number of factors.

PPL Performers are placed into categories on the Sound Recordings they have performed on; featured, other featured, and non-featured.

== Repertoire ==
A licence is required from PPL whenever recorded music within its repertoire is played in public or broadcast. PPL's repertoire includes all recorded music owned or controlled by its direct members or by members of any of the overseas collective management organisations with which PPL has a reciprocal agreement. PPL's repertoire covers the vast majority of recorded music commercially available in the UK.

== PPL database ==
The database is the core of PPL's business and the main interface with its registered members. The database holds all the information required to both license the music and to distribute collected licenses to PPL's members. It contains the metadata (or details included in the file) of all the music registered by PPL's members that is relevant to both identify a piece of music and determine its legal status.

== The difference between PPL and PRS for music licensing ==
PPL and PRS for Music are separate, independent companies and in most instances a licence is required from both organisations to legally play recorded music in public. As of 2018 both organisations have launched a joint venture via formation of a new Private limited company called PPL PRS Ltd which aims to streamline the process of obtaining a Music license in the UK. While both companies licence the use of music and collect royalties for the music industry, they represent different rights holders and have separate licences, terms, and conditions. PPL collects and distributes money for the use of recorded music on behalf of record companies and performers. PRS for Music collects and distributes money for the use of the musical composition and lyrics on behalf of authors, songwriters, composers, and publishers.

== Other ventures ==
Video Performance Ltd, incorporated 23 May 1984, is a private limited company the PPL's website states is as a "sister company" but it is a separate legal entity. VPL licenses music videos when they are played in public or broadcast on television. VPL distributes the fees as royalties to its rights-holder members whose names appear on the VPL register and are kept under Section 352 of the Companies Act 1985. Although technically a separate company, VPL operates under the same management as PPL. All activities relating to music videos are conducted as VPL business.
