= Interested Parties Information =

Rights organisation identifier

IPI (Interested party information) is a unique identifying number assigned by the CISAC database to each Interested Party in collective rights management. It is used worldwide by more than 120 countries and three million right holders.

Two types of IPI-numbers exist, an IPI Name Number and IPI Base Number.

== IPI Name Number ==
The IP Name Number is the code for a name or pseudonym related to an entity (natural person or a legal entity). One entity can have several names. Prince for example has the IPI-codes 00045620792 (Nelson Prince Rogers), 00052210040 (Prince) and 00334284961 (Nelson Prince R).

The IPI Name Number is composed of eleven numeric digits.

== IPI Base Number ==
The IPI Base Number is the code for a natural person or a legal entity. It has the pattern H-NNNNNNNNN-C.

- H: header (a single letter)
- N: identification number (nine numeric digits)
- C: check digit (a single number)

For example Pablo Picasso has the IP Base Number I-001068130-6.

== History ==
In October 2001, the IPI database replaced the CAE numbers.

== Relation with ISWC-numbers ==
IPI codes are connected with International Standard Musical Work Codes (ISWC). For example, one of the songs called Ernie, which has an International Standard Musical Work Code number of ISWC T-010.171.314-7, has just one interested party, that of Benny Hill whose IPI number is 00014107338. This IPI number can then be used to find all other works by him.

=== Roles ===
In relation to ISWC each party has at least one role. Roles can be:

- A: Author, Writer, Lyricist
- AD: Adaptor
- AM: Administrator
- AR: Arranger
- AQ: Acquirer
- C: Composer
- CA: Composer/Author
- E: Original Publisher
- ES: Substitute Publisher
- PA: Publisher Income Participant
- PR: Associated Performer
- SA: Sub-Author
- SE: Sub-Publisher
- SR: Sub-Arranger
- TR: Translator

The standards describe the person who adapts music as an arranger, and the person who adapts the text of a musical work to be an adapter.
