= SUISA =

Swiss copyright collection and performing rights society

Swiss Cooperative Society for Music Authors and Publishers
- Abbreviation: SUISA
- Formation: 1923; 102 years ago
- Headquarters: Zurich, Switzerland
- Website: suisa.ch

SUISA is the cooperative society for music authors in Switzerland and Liechtenstein. The Swiss Cooperative Society for Music Authors and Publishers (French: Coopérative des auteurs et éditeurs de musique; German: Genossenschaft der Urheber und Verleger von Musik; Italian: Cooperativa degli autori ed editori di musica) or Swiss Society for the Rights of Authors of Musical Works (French: Société suisse pour les droits des auteurs d'œuvres musicales; German: Schweizerische Gesellschaft für die Rechte der Urheber von musikalischen Werken; Italian: Società svizzera per i diritti degli autori di opere musicali), commonly known as SUISA (from SUISse Auteurs, "Switzerland Authors"), is the collecting society for Swiss songwriters, composers and music publishers.

It undertakes collective rights management for its members in order to collect license fees when their musical works are performed in public, broadcast or transmitted, and to pay out performing royalties. It was formed in 1923. It is also the administrative body for the CAE number.
