= Cultural Commons Collecting Society =

European cooperative music licensor

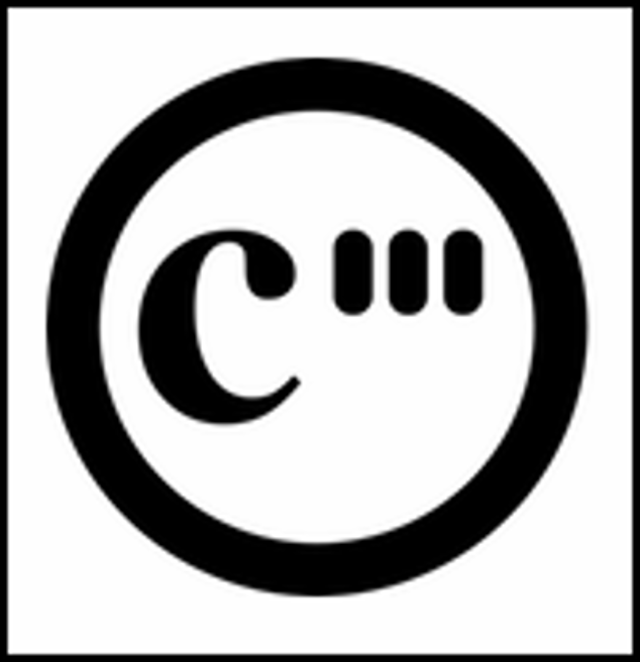
Logo

The Cultural Commons Collecting Society SCE mbH (C3S) is a European Cooperative Society which aims to create a Collecting Society for music.

The project is currently coordinated and operated by OpenMusicContest.org, a Düsseldorf-based association which considered it necessary to create a Collecting Society that would compete with GEMA which currently holds a monopoly on music licensing. C3S aims to be different from GEMA: All C3S members are allowed to vote in the members' assembly and will be able to choose which of their works they want to have handled by C3S and under which licenses. Accounting is intended to be fully automated.

Initial funding for the project came from a crowd funding campaign that yielded 119,000 €. The project also got a positive rating at the "Digitales Medienland NRW" innovation competition. As a result of this, C3S will receive 200,000 € of government funds from the state of Northrine-Westphalia if they manage to collect another 200,000 € themselves.

On 25 September 2013, C3S was founded as a European Cooperative Society in Hamburg and has since been seeking approval from the German Trademark and Patent Office (DPMA) while working on their infrastructure to become operative as a collecting society.

Beta testing of user registration and administration of songs is planned for winter 2022.

== Links ==
- Homepage
