= Chennai Centre for China Studies =

Indian think tank

- Abbreviation: C3S
- Formation: 4 April 2008
- Headquarters: Chennai Centre for China Studies, No.37 TTK Road, CIT Colony, Alwarpet, Chennai-600018 Tamil Nadu, India
- Location: Chennai, India
- Region served: India
- Director General: Commodore R. Seshadri Vasan
- Key people: Ambassador M. Ganapathi; M. R. Sivaraman, IAS; L. V. Krishnan; Col. R. Hariharan, VSM; Sridharan Subramanyam; Rajaram Muthukrishnan; Sunil Rallan
- Website: www.c3sindia.org

The Chennai Centre for China Studies (C3S) is an Indian think tank that carries out research on developments in China offering a peninsular perspective and assigns priority to Indian policy interests.

== History ==
C3S was registered under the Tamil Nadu Societies Registration Act (1975) in 2008 and is a non-profit organization.

== Areas of research ==
- Business and Economics
- Defence and Security
- Geopolitics and Strategy
- Society and Politics
- Science and Technology
- Human Rights and Law
- Culture and History
- Environment and Health

== Young Minds of C3S ==
The Young Minds of C3S is an initiative taken by C3S that is designed to encourage a younger generation of China-oriented scholars to contribute to the academic and technical conversation around the subject of China and Indo-China relations.
