= Harald Heker =

German chief executive (born 1958)

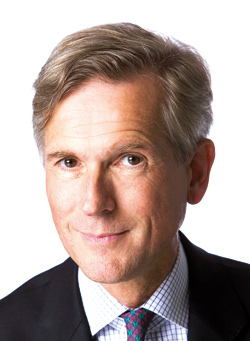
Harald Heker

Harald Heker (born 1 March 1958) is a former chief executive officer (CEO) of GEMA, the German performance rights organization based in Berlin and Munich. He was CEO from 2007 until his retirement in 2023.

== Biography ==
Born in Essen, Heker studied law at LMU Munich and obtained his Ph.D. at the University of Freiburg. He also obtained an LL.M. degree at Princeton University. The topic of his thesis was: The legal and technological battle in the music industry.

From 1988 to 1990, Heker worked as a lawyer and director of the Institute of Copyright and Media Law in Munich. From 1990 to 2000, he worked as a legal adviser to the German Booksellers` Association. Between 2001 and 2005, Heker was Chief Executive Officer of the Association.

Heker joined the GEMA in 2006, and became the Chief Executive Officer in 2007. The GEMA had to reposition itself. A high percentage of the music content is now distributed via the Internet. A legal conflict with the Video sharing website YouTube was the result.
