= International Standard Musical Work Code =

Unique identifier for musical works

The International Standard Musical Work Code (ISWC) is a unique identifier for musical works, similar to the book's ISBN. It is adopted as international standard ISO 15707. The ISO subcommittee responsible for the standard is TC 46/SC 9.

== Format ==
Each code is composed of three parts:

1. prefix element (1 character)
2. work identifier (9 digits)
3. check digit (1 digit)

Currently, the only prefix defined is "T," indicating Musical works. However, additional prefixes may be defined in the future to expand the available range of identifiers and/or expand the system to additional types of works.

=== Computation of the check digit ===
With

- $d_i$: one of the nine digits of the work identifier (i=1 to 9) from left to right.
- $C$: check digit.

$S = 1 + \sum_{i=1}^{i=9}id_i$

$C = (10 - (S \mod 10)) \mod 10$

==== Example: T-034.524.680-C ====
$i$	1	2	3	4	5	6	7	8	9
$d_i$	0	3	4	5	2	4	6	8	0
$i*d_i$	0	6	12	20	10	24	42	64	0

$S=1 + 0 + 6 + 12 + 20 + 10 + 24 + 42 + 64 + 0 = 179$

$C=(10 - (S \mod 10)) \mod 10$

$C = (10 - (179 \mod 10)) \mod 10$

$C= (10 - 9) \mod 10$

$C=1$

ISWC identifiers are commonly written the form T-123.456.789-C. The grouping is for easy reading only; the numbers do not incorporate information about the work's region, author, publisher, etc. Rather, they are simply issued in sequence. These separators are not required, and no other separators are allowed.

The first ISWC was assigned in 1995, for the song "Dancing Queen" by ABBA; the code is T-000.000.001-0.

== Usage ==
To register an ISWC, the following minimal information must be supplied:

- title
- names of all composers, arrangers, and authors, with their role in the piece (identified by role code) and their CAE/IPI number
- work classification code (CIS)
- identification of other works it is a derivative of

Note: an ISWC identifies works, not recordings. ISRC can be used to identify recordings. Nor does it identify individual publications (e.g. issues of a recording on physical media, sheet music, broadcast at a particular frequency/modulation/time/location...)

Its primary purpose is collecting society administration and identify works in legal contracts. It would also be useful in library cataloguing.

Due to the fact that a musical work can have multiple authors, it is inevitable that, on rare occasions, a duplicate ISWC might exist and not be detected immediately. Because of the existing business practices among collecting societies, it is not possible to declare an ISWC as obsolete. In such cases, as soon as they are identified, the system will deal with duplicate registrations by linking such registration records in the ISWC database and its related products.

== See also ==
- International Standard Music Number
- Global Release Identifier
