= CAE number =

In musical rights management, the CAE number was previously used to identify rights holders. The acronym "CAE" was devised by the national society of Switzerland, SUISA, and consisted of the French words Compositeur, Auteur and Editeur, for Composer, Author and Publisher. A CAE number is 9 digits long.

It is being phased out and has been replaced by the IPI code.
