= Edgar Berger =

German business executive (born 1966)

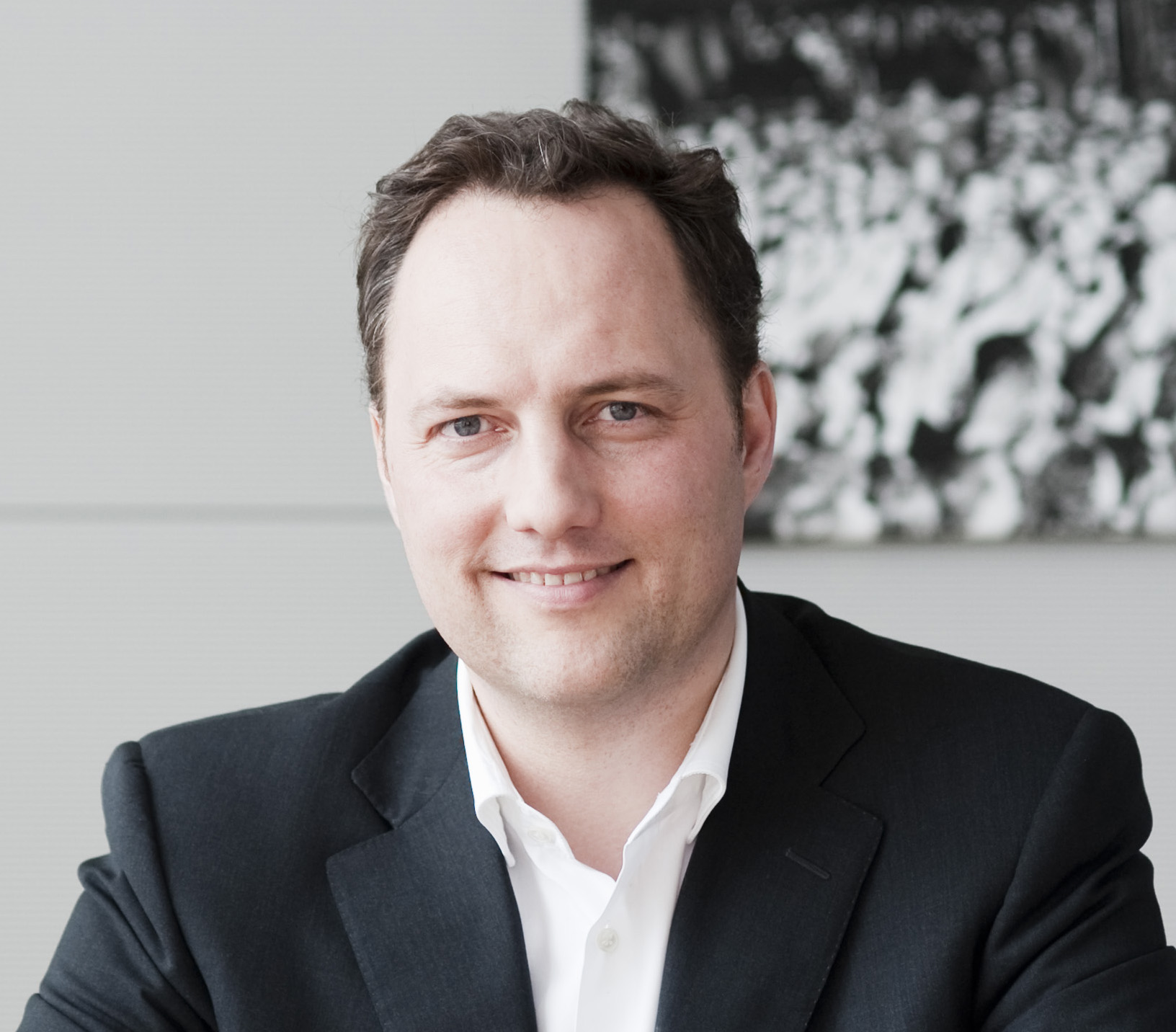
- Edgar Berger in 2014
- Born: 19 October 1966 (age 60); Wolfsburg, Lower Saxony, Germany
- Occupation: Manager
- Years active: 1992–
- Employer: AutoScout24 Group
- Title: CEO

Edgar Berger (born October 19, 1966) is the chief executive officer of the AutoScout24 Group since April 2020. He has more than 25 years of experience in the media, entertainment and tech sector. Berger held the position of chairman and CEO international of Sony Music Entertainment from 2011 to 2017, responsible for business outside the United States, before being replaced by Rob Stringer. Previously, Berger worked for Bertelsmann, RTL and Roland Berger Strategy Consultants. He has been on the board of the German Music Industry Association.

== Life and career ==
Edgar Berger was born in Wolfsburg. He studied engineering, economics and philosophy in Braunschweig, Paris and Berlin. He graduated with a degree in mechanical engineering and then accepted a job as a consultant at Roland Berger Strategy Consultants. In 1994 he moved to IA Television and later on RTL Television, where he initially worked for RTL II. From 1998 to 2000 Berger reported as a political correspondent for RTL Television, giving up-to-date reports from Bonn and Berlin. In 2000 he took a job at Bertelsmann, first as director of the Bertelsmann Content Network in Hamburg and New York, then from 2001, as the chief operating officer. Berger, working under Rolf Schmidt-Holtz, was thus responsible for the networking of the different business divisions, and later also for worldwide business development.

In June 2005, Bertelsmann announced that Edgar Berger had been appointed head of the German subsidiary of Sony BMG. The joint venture with Sony had only been launched recently, Berger was first appointed as a member of the Board of Management and then, from Spring of 2006, as the sole director. The decisions he made that received a good deal of attention were strengthening the Munich location of Sony BMG alongside Berlin, and focusing more on German artists. The remaining shares in Four Music as well as the rights to TKKG were acquired. In addition, under Berger's leadership, Sony BMG Germany got involved in the concert business and the digital music distribution. Berger has been a member of the board of management of the German Phono Association since 2006.

In early 2009 Edgar Berger took over the management for Sony BMG in Austria and Switzerland, along with Germany. In 2011 he finally moved from Munich to London, where he was named President & CEO International by Doug Morris and later became Chairman & CEO International. He took over responsibility for the record label's worldwide business outside the United States. Berger was on the board of the German Music Industry Association (Bundesverband Musikindustrie) and he is still on the board of the Cultural Association of German Industry (Kulturkreis der deutschen Wirtschaft). He is also a member of the Main Board of IFPI.

== Controversies ==
In 2006, Berger argued for a better protection of "intellectual property". At the same time he also called for the restriction of the right to private copying as well as a ban on "intelligent recording programs". He stated that it should only be authorized to make copies from one’s own original and no longer from third parties, some downloaders may be banned from the internet. In 2010, Berger asked that ISPs be obliged to commit more strongly to the protection of "intellectual property". Once again in 2012, Berger spoke out for tougher laws against "pirated" copies. He based his demands on the fact that in 2011 about 3.6 billion tracks had been sold, while 40 billion tracks had been downloaded illegally.

Berger described Germany as a "developing country in the digital sense", after GEMA prevented the featuring of music videos on YouTube. He was frustrated that GEMA acted "against their interests". Berger argued for more support of services like Spotify or Vevo in Germany, because he "loves the internet". In 2013 Berger admitted that the music industry should have provided certain services more quickly. The large service providers also carried some responsibility for the decline of the market by approximately half its volume, he said. After sales figures began to rise again, he stated that digital sales were not a threat to music, but instead would "save" it.

Preceded by Richard Sanders	Chairman & CEO International of Sony Music Entertainment; 2011-2017	Succeeded by Rob Stringer
