= GÜFA =

Gesellschaft zur Übernahme und Wahrnehmung von Filmaufführungsrechten mbH
- Purpose: Collective rights management
- Headquarters: Düsseldorf
- Region served: Germany
- Official language: German
- Website: guefa.de

GÜFA (Gesellschaft zur Übernahme und Wahrnehmung von Filmaufführungsrechten mbH) is a German copyright collective of pornographic film production companies and copyright holders. As a copyright collective, GÜFA performs collective rights management for its member companies, such as by enforcing film distribution rights and copyright. It also endeavors to influence German law to the advantage of its member companies. The organisation is headquartered in Düsseldorf.

GÜFA operates in the Netherlands as GÜFA Nederland, and cooperates with several comparable organisations in other European countries: V.A.M. (Verwertungsgesellschaft für Audiovisuelle Medien) of Austria, SIA ATBALSS of Latvia, EGEDA Ciudad de la Imagen of Spain, and Intergram of the Czech Republic.

Pornographic films and videos registered with GÜFA must bear its seal on their packaging. Furthermore, the GÜFA seal must be included before the film's or video's opening credits.

== See also ==
- Gesellschaft für musikalische Aufführungs- und mechanische Vervielfältigungsrechte (GEMA)
- Pornography by region
- The term of yet unknown types of use in German copyright law
