= Copyright law of Germany =

German authors' right or Deutsches Urheberrecht is codified in the Gesetz über Urheberrecht und verwandte Schutzrechte (also referred to as Urhebergesetz or Urheberrechtsgesetz and abbreviated UrhG). An official translation is available.

It should not be confused with copyright (exclusive rights to copy granted to distributors), and is more akin to authors' rights (exclusive rights to profit from one's work granted to authors).

== Protection requirements ==
Court decisions have set vastly different standards for the eligibility of works of applied art on the one hand and other types of work on the other, especially fine art. While the barrier is usually very low for fine art and protection is granted even for minimal creativity (dubbed "kleine Münze", literally "small coin" or "small change"), there are extremely high standards for applied art to be reached for it to achieve copyright protection. This is so because Geschmacksmuster (design patents) and Schriftzeichengesetz (typeface patents) are seen as lex specialis for applied art such that the threshold of originality must not be assumed low for them. This has been confirmed by courts several times, especially for logos, but also for earrings.

== Transfer ==
The Urhebergesetz is an authors' right (droit d'auteur) or "monistic" style law. As such there is a special emphasis on the relation between the work and its actual author. The right is perceived as an aspect of the author's general personality right and as a general rule is therefore inalienable. This also means that there is no corporate copyright in Germany and the fundamental rights cannot be transferred except by inheritance ("heritage").

== Licences ==
While exclusive licences are almost as powerful as copyright transfer, the author always retains some rights to the work, including the right to prevent defacing and to be identified as the author. Employment agreements are frequently construed as granting the employer an exclusive licence to any works created by the employee within the scope of their obligations. For computer software, the copyright act expressly provides that all economic usage rights (as opposed to personality rights) "belong" to the employer.

A recent amendment of the Urhebergesetz (sec. 31a, included in 2008) has created the possibility to grant licences for "unknown uses", i.e. permit use of works in media not known at the time the licence is granted. Previously this had not been possible, so that even "unrestricted" licences granted before the mid-1990s did not (and could not) include the right to use the work on the internet, which created considerable practical problems.

== Collection monopolies ==
Copyright collecting societies that collect royalties as part of compulsory licensing in the European Union (EU) usually hold monopolies in their respective national markets. In Germany, case law has established the so-called GEMA Vermutung, a presumption that works are managed by the Gesellschaft für musikalische Aufführungs- und mechanische Vervielfältigungsrechte (GEMA) due to its monopoly position. As such, in Germany the burden of proof is on the accused infringer that the work is not managed by GEMA.

== EU Directive ==
Germany has implemented the EU Copyright Directive 93/98/EEC. Parts of the Directive were based on German authors' right law in the first place, e.g. the duration of copyright term: German authors' right law had previously granted protection for 70 years after the death of the author, which was the longest term of all EU member states; prior to 1965, the protection was life plus 80 years.

== History ==
According to historian Eckhard Höffner the 1710 introduction of copyright law in Great Britain and later in France acted as a barrier to economic progress for over a century, while Germany prospered in the same time frame due to the lack of copyright laws. At that time Germany did not yet exist as a unified nation; and the many states that comprised the German territories were still primarily agrarian. Copyright law was absent and not enforceable. Prussia introduced a copyright law rather late, in 1837, but even then authors and publishers just had to go to another German state to circumvent its ruling. Höffner argues that, as a result, there was a massive proliferation of books, fostering the spread of knowledge and laying the foundation for the country's eventual industrial ascendency. Comparing the English system, where copyright ruled, to the free-wheeling German situation, he notes that in 1843 about 14,000 new publications, including a high proportion of academic works, were published in Germany, compared to only about 1,000 publications in England. In England publishers exploited their position, paying authors little, while selling their products for the well-to-do. In Germany, publishers had to sell cheaply to the masses in a competitive market, aside from producing luxury editions for the wealthy. Höffner believes that the availability of bestsellers and academic works at low prices fostered a wide, educated readership; he also argues that the lack of copyright benefited the authors financially. Eventually copyright laws were enacted throughout Germany, and with unification, in 1871, such laws also became enforceable. In the meantime, Höffner contends, Britain had lost its intellectual head start on the Industrial Revolution.

== The fundamentals of copyright law according to § 31 of the German Copyright Act (UrhG) ==
The author is the creator of their work, which enjoys copyright protection in accordance with the UrhG, §§ 7, 1, 2 UrhG. Accordingly, all work resulting from a personal intellectual activity is copyright protected.

The "principle of non-transferability" of full or divided authorship according to § 29 I UrhG is valid. Therefore, the creator of an original work can neither transfer their personal right as a creator, nor the complete rights for the exploitation of their work to others. According to §§ 15 f. UrhG the author is the only one who is able to take advantage of the exploitation rights.

If an author himself does not want to exploit their own work, it is possible to grant the rights of utilisation to another person. In accordance with the regulation of § 29 II UrhG (referring to § 31 UrhG) the copyright itself cannot be transferred as long as the author is alive. However, the author can choose whether or not they want to grant certain exploitation rights regarding their copyright protected work to another one. The authorised person purchases the warranty to utilise the work in the granted way, separated into several types of use. The right of use can be granted as a non-exclusive right or an exclusive right of use. It can be granted with restrictions on spatial and temporal usage or restrictions on the exploitation concerning the contents, § 31 I 2 UrhG.

=== Exploitation rights and the rights of use ===
The copyright law protects an author regarding their intellectual and personal relationship to the work and the types of its utilisation, § 11 UrhG. According to § 11 UrhG the author shall participate in all kinds of utilisation of their work. The author’s economic interests in their work shall be protected by the exploitation rights.

A (not final) list of exploitation rights is presented in § 15 UrhG. The exploitation right must be distinguished from the right of use. The non-transferability of the authorship means that there is no way to transfer the exploitation rights on the whole. However, there is the possibility of granting certain rights of use to someone else, according to the § 31 UrhG. It is up to the author if they want to grant e. g. a publisher the right to reproduce and distribute their work.

==== Non-exclusive right of use ====
The non-exclusive right of use entitles the right holder to use the work only as allowed by contractual terms and without exclusion of possible usage by a third party, § 31 II UrhG. e.g. the author can grant a non-exclusive right of using a stage play to not just one but several theatre ensembles.

==== Exclusive right of use ====
The exclusive right of use, entitles the right holder to use the work exclusively as allowed by contractual terms meaning no other person can be given the (exclusive) right of using a stage play to only one theatre ensemble. The right holder, however, can be given the right of independently granting non-exclusive rights of that work if the author agrees, § 31 III 1 UrhG.

==== Types of use ====
The right to use a copyright protected work may cover individual or all types of use, § 31 I 1 UrhG. The concept of "type of use" is not defined by law, and there is no list featuring possibilities of use. From the wording of § 31 I 1 UrhG ("einzelne oder alle", "several or all") it can be inferred that each type of use shows distinctive characteristics.

A type of use must, thus, be clearly distinguishable from any other type of use. For each type of use there is consequently a corresponding right of use. If there are several types of use in connection with their work, there will be, in proportion, various rights of use the author can grant. The types of use have changed and evolved in the course of technical development and they still continue to do so. The term "kind of use" refers to "all technically and economically concretised utilisation of an author's work, meaning that the parties to a contract have specified the use of the work as required for achieving the contractual purpose. The kinds of use listed in § 15 UrhG can be subdivided into several rights of use which again can be matched, each, with a corresponding type of use, so it is always possible to restrict a right of use in many different ways as long as the specification of the use of work makes clear the individuality of the type of use with respect to its economic and technical content. So there is a possibility to control the use of one's work by specifying the types of use, thereby limiting the rights of use.

==== Prohibition of granting rights of utilisation for yet unknown types of use, § 31 IV UrhG ====
The binding regulation as stated in § 31 IV UrhG made the concession of rights of use for yet unknown types and the legal obligations resulting therefrom ineffective and it limited the rights of use down to only the types of use known at that time. It was intended that the author should be protected to the best possible extent against an unlimited exploitation of their rights due to types of use which could not be foreseen at the time of conclusion of the contract. The author could, however, decide whether or not they agreed to have their work exploited regarding a type of use not yet known at the time of conclusion of the contract and if so, by whom. It was intended that the countervalue of granting rights of use for new types of use should always be secured for the author; they should be in the position of negotiating an appropriate fee arrangement.

It is decisive that the type of use is not only specified by its technical possibilities but also by its economical importance and usability. It is also decisive, inter alia, whether a large audience is targeted, whether separate distribution structures are created or whether the range of economic exploitation can be significantly expanded. A type of use needs to be sufficiently known to have established itself in a market at a fixed price. It could be that a new technique differs clearly from an established one creating a new kind of use. Furthermore, it is also possible that a technically known but economically not yet relevant kind of use could be part of a contract if specifically named and explicitly agreed upon between the parties. According to jurisdiction, contracts on yet unknown types of use (representing a so-called business of risk) are only effective if such a type is specifically named, explicitly discussed and agreed upon in the contract; never does this form a part of the general terms and conditions. As kinds of independent and formerly not yet known types of use exploitation on e. g. narrow-gauge film, on video and via video on demand are all recognised by the legislator.

=== Abolition of § 31 IV UrhG and its replacement by § 31a UrhG as of 31 December 2007 ===
§ 31 IV UrhG was abolished and replaced by the new § 31a UrhG by the end of December 2007. Since then the parties are able to enter into a so-called buy-out contract, meaning that the author will grant all rights of use of the known and yet unknown type of use to the other party.

==== Scope of application and applicability conditions ====
According to its personal scope of application, § 31a UrhG affects solely contracts between the author or their legal successor and the right holder. As a future economic success is not measurable, the granting of exploitation rights by using yet unknown types of use is reserved to the author, even if they have already granted exploitation rights concerning known types of use.

==== Requirement of written form ====
In accordance with § 31a UrhG the author is entitled to grant rights of use or to contractually bind himself to do so, even if the type of use is yet unknown at that time. A pre-condition be that the author submits their intention in written form, § 31a I 1 UrhG. If a written document is lacking the agreement will have no legal bearing since void; it will be unenforceable by law.

==== Right of rescission ====
Pursuant to § 31a I 1 UrhG the author has the right of rescission, § 31a I 3 UrhG. In spite of a valid claim to reasonable compensation, the right of rescission enables the author to change a decision and cancel the granting of rights concerning the use of yet unknown types of use on the whole or just partially without adverse legal consequences. The general possibility of revoking one's former decision according to § 31a UrhG will prevent any comprehensive and legally binding licensing of known and yet unknown types of use (as usual in US-American law) within the framework of German copyright law in the future.

==== Indispensability clause ====
§ 31a UrhG corresponds to the severe character of § 31 IV UrhG. It severely regulates the requirement of written form, the right of rescission and the conditions of expiry and omission of rescission as being indispensable in advance.

=== Concept of the yet unknown types of use in the sense of § 31a UrhG and conclusion ===
Since 1 January 2008 the new § 31a UrhG deals with new types of use. However, the contractual granting of rights to use yet unknown types of use is principally not impossible any more, but tied to appointed conditions. So far it is possible that a new type of use will be evaluated in the future under less rigorous constituent elements.

Finally it remains the author's decision whether they grant the rights to exploit their work via a new, yet unknown type of use or not. They can prevent that the utilisation of their work be tied to a yet unknown type of use or they can negotiate new and individual conditions if they chooses to grant the right of utilisation in connection with yet unknown types of use.

== Parallel act covering research and education effective 1 March 2018 ==
On 1 March 2018, the Act to align copyright law with the current demands of the knowledge‑based society or Urheberrechts-Wissensgesellschafts-Gesetz (abbreviated UrhWissG) covering the fields of research and education came into force.

== See also ==
- Image copyright (Germany)
- German patent law
