= GEMA (German organization) =

German performing rights society

Gesellschaft für musikalische Aufführungs- und mechanische Vervielfältigungsrechte
- Abbreviation: GEMA
- Formation: September 28, 1933; 93 years ago
- Purpose: Collecting society for collective rights management
- Headquarters: Berlin and Munich
- Location: Germany
- Region served: Germany
- Members: c. 5,000 full members, c. 95,000 candidate members with limited rights
- Official language: German
- Chairperson: Tobias Holzmüller
- Staff: 789
- Website: www.gema.de

The Gesellschaft für musikalische Aufführungs- und mechanische Vervielfältigungsrechte (GEMA; "Society for musical performing and mechanical reproduction rights") is a government-mandated collecting society and performance rights organization based in Germany, with administrative offices in Berlin and Munich. GEMA represents the usage rights stemming from authors' rights (e.g., mechanical licensing, broadcast licensing, synchronization licensing) for the musical works of those composers, lyricists, and publishers who are members in the organization. It is the only such institution in Germany and a member of BIEM and CISAC. Other collecting societies include the (AKM) Society of authors, composers and music publishers (de) in Austria and SUISA in Switzerland.

As an "accredited profit-making association with legal capacity" (German: rechtsfähiger wirtschaftlicher Verein), GEMA's capacity to be a subject of legal rights and duties is based upon state conferral (under Article 22 of the German civil code). The chairperson of the executive board (CEO) is Tobias Holzmüller (since 2023); the chairperson of the board of directors is Ralf Weigand.

== Structure and membership ==
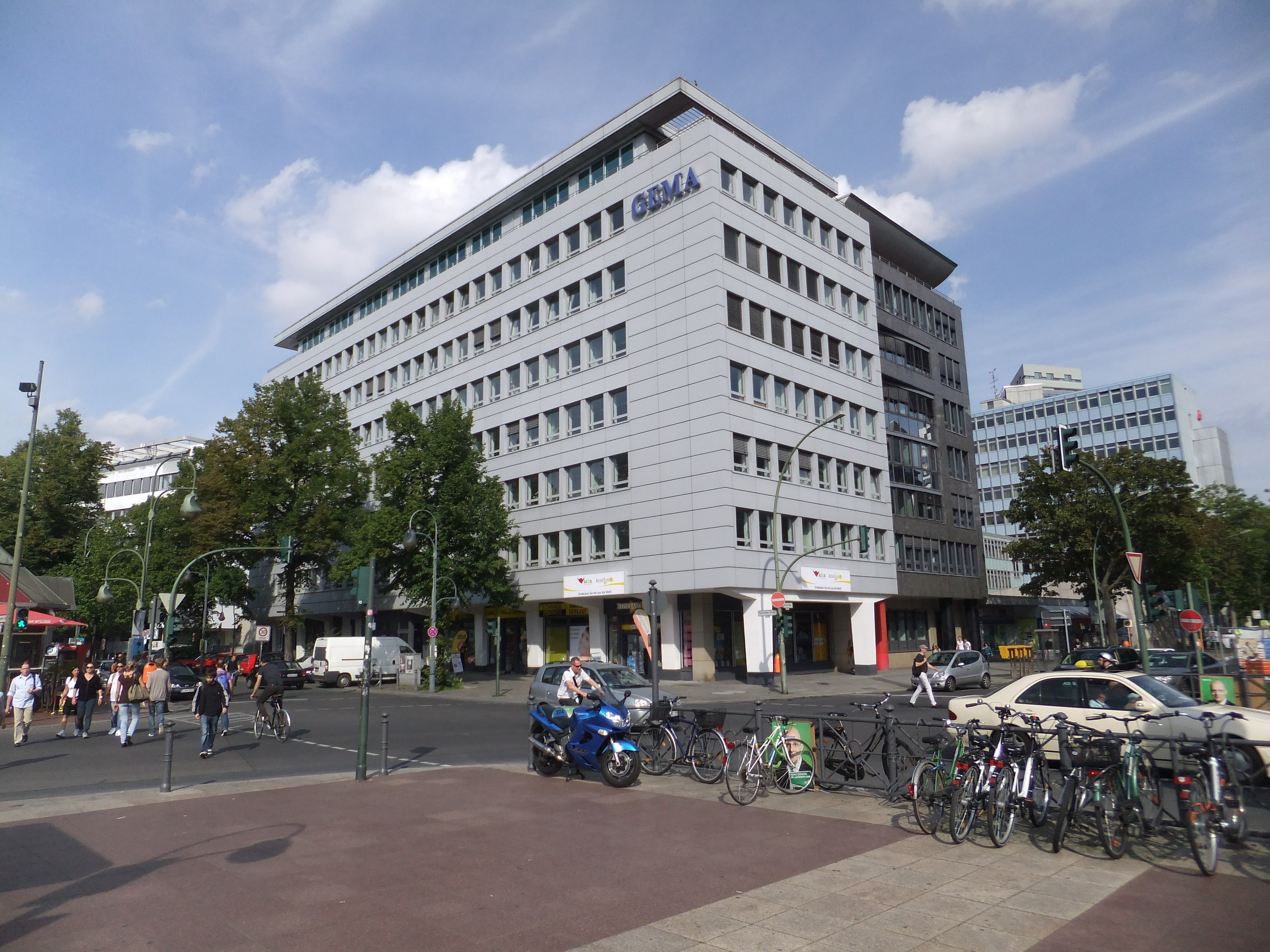
The Berlin offices of GEMA on Bayreuther Straße near Wittenbergplatz

GEMA is organized according to Vereinsrecht (German law of association). It directly represents some 5,000 composers, lyricists, and music publishers as full members, along with approximately 95,000 more as members with sharply restricted rights who have entered into a deed of assignment with GEMA without fulfilling the professional requirements for full membership. Members of this latter group are termed "extraordinary members" within the organization, but they do not enjoy the rights associated with membership under German law of association. As of 2010, GEMA also represents a further 2 million international rights-holders within Germany, through reciprocal arrangements with other performance rights organizations.

Membership in GEMA is necessarily voluntary, since all usage rights (stemming from German authors' rights law) are reserved exclusively by the author. In contrast with copyright as it usually appears in common law, authors' rights are inalienable (i.e., non-transferable), which means that the author can transfer only the exercise of these rights to another natural or legal person. Therefore, the author theoretically reserves the right to exercise her/his own rights or to transfer these duties to another third party (e.g., a collecting society or performance rights organization). The de facto situation remains in GEMA's favor, however, as all efforts to found a competing institution have thus far been hindered by the German Patent and Trademark Office, and the sole management of one's own authors' rights remains a daunting task for lone artists.

In order to be represented by GEMA, authors (i.e., composers and lyricists along with their publishers and heirs) must become a member and sign a deed of assignment (German: Berechtigungsvertrag) with GEMA, transferring the exercise and exploitation of media rights for the author's entire repertoire to GEMA. Member authors are entitled to apply for full membership after spending five years as extraordinary members, fulfilling the requirement of maintaining a payout-level from GEMA above a certain minimum value. Until then, they belong to the status category of "extraordinary member," with limited voting rights (and usually a meagre share of fee revenues, ca. 4.8% in 2010). Other people, who are indeed authors but neither composers nor lyricists (nor publishers nor inheritors of authors), can also enter into a deed of assignment with GEMA; however, these authors cannot gain full membership, instead remaining so-called "associated members." The overwhelming majority of those represented by GEMA have no access to membership status as defined and protected under the German civil code (see Articles 21–79), holding instead the pseudo-title of "associated member." In 2010, approximately 24.11% of fee revenues were distributed to associated members.

GEMA is organized by professional and status groupings. German members of GEMA can be divided into two groups: 95,000 extraordinary members (German: außerordentliche Mitglieder) and 5,000 full members (German: ordentliche Mitglieder). Formerly the division was into three groups: associated members (German: angeschlossende Mitglieder), extraordinary and full members. Those who have signed a deed of assignment with GEMA but do not fulfill the requirements for full membership can become extraordinary members. Extraordinary members do not count as members in the legal sense, as defined in the German civil code concerning associations. Full and extraordinary members must be either composers, lyricists, or music publishers. Extraordinary members can become full members, when they have received at least €30,000 in fee payouts from GEMA over five consecutive years (of which the yearly income must be at least €1,800 for four of the five years). There is an elevated minimum revenue for publishers, currently at €75,000 over five years (with a yearly minimum of €4,500 for four of those years).

The purpose of GEMA is to collect royalty fees from the organisers of events where music protected by this organization is played as well as media manufacturers, publishers, and broadcasting stations. GEMA collected 850 million euros in copyright fees in 2008. Disbursements go largely to the full members (2010: 64%), whose repertoire represents the lion's share of the listed works. The distribution of revenue and disbursement procedures are decided annually at the general assembly, which consists of approximately 3,000 full members as well as 64 delegates representing the associated and extraordinary members. The general assembly elects the 15 members of the board of directors (6 composers, 4 lyricists, 5 publishers). The board of directors appoints the chairperson.

According to GEMA by-laws, the delegates for the extraordinary and associated members must be appointed according to the following pattern: 32 delegates must be composers (of which at least 12 must be inheritors/legal successors), 12 lyricists (of which at least 6 inheritors), and 20 publishers. In 2010, there were 6 inheritors among the extraordinary members (0.1%) and 3,749 among the associated members (6.9%). As a consequence, a minority of 26 currently-active composers and lyricists must contend with a majority of 38 rights managers and legal successors.

Users of GEMA-protected works—primarily manufacturers of audio/video media, radio and television broadcasters, and the organizers of events such as music festivals, street festivals, Christmas markets and many more—procure the always-required usage rights from GEMA by paying a fee, which is to be paid to the rights-holders after the deduction of an administrative handling charge.

== Fees and private copying levy ==
Licensing fees must be paid to GEMA for the public performance of protected musical works belonging to GEMA's so-called "world inventory" (German: Weltrepertoire); these are then paid out to its members according to a complex distribution scheme. The division of royalties operates through a points system, which distinguishes between "entertainment music" (German: U-Musik, Unterhaltungsmusik) and "serious music" (German: E-Musik, ernste Musik); for example, a single pop song is worth 12 points in this system, whereas a large orchestral work with a playing time longer than 70 minutes is worth 1,200 points.

According to Article 54 of German authors' rights law, a private copying levy (or: blank media tax) can be applied to devices and media that "[...] are used for the making of reproductions [...]", which is already included in the price. This levy first goes to the German Central Office for Dubbing Rights (ZPÜ), and from there a portion is forwarded to GEMA. In 2004, the International Federation of the Phonographic Industry (IFPI) applied to lower the licensing fee rates for sound recording media from 9.009% to 5.6% of the manufacturer's price. GEMA criticized this push as "an attempt by the German phonographic industry to solve their problems on the backs and at the expense of creative composers and lyricists." In 2005, the board of arbitration of the German Patent and Trademark Office in Munich decided in favor of GEMA, preventing the proposed licensing fee rate-reduction. Other arbitration processes attempted by the IFPI (regarding music videos, downloads, and ring tones) in 2006 were decided in favor of GEMA by the board of arbitration of the German Patent and Trademark Office.

GEMA also exercises the rights of authors in the online sector. GEMA licenses responsible content providers, such as Musicload, Apple's iTunes Store, Spotify, Napster, and others. The data is provided by GEMA itself; since 1 January 2007, the exercise of online usage rights for certain parts of its inventory is no longer managed by GEMA, but rather through CELAS.

The charges for performances and background music are tiered.

The playback of GEMA-protected music in telephone systems as background music for answering messages or on-hold music also must be declared to GEMA. Many businesses (especially small ones) are unaware of this obligation. The same applies to the valorization of internet presence through audio-branding involving the use of music.

Since April 2003, GEMA offers access to its database of musical works on its website, including approximately 1.6 Million copyrighted musical works.

== Legal basis ==
All collective rights management societies operate on the basis of laws and ordinances. Within the European Community, these collecting societies derive their legitimacy from constitutional protections for intellectual property and intangible assets, in the form of intellectual property law, which is enshrined in the constitutions of European states.

Although the concept of intellectual property had already been established in the 1866 constitution of the North German Confederation as well as in the 1871 Constitution of the German Empire, Article 14 of the current Grundgesetz (German: Basic Law for the Federal Republic of Germany) only generally addresses property rights, inheritance law, and expropriation, including the issue of intellectual property. By contrast, in the constitution of the free state of Bavaria—and also previously in Baden and Greater Hesse, which were formed before the Grundgesetz (1949)—the intellectual property of authors, inventors, and artists come under the direct protection of the state, which explicitly allows for the existence of collecting societies.

Furthermore, collecting societies receive their legitimacy from German author's rights (German: Urheberrecht), which is legally regulated in all European states. German author's rights law (German: Urheberrechtsgesetze) grants authors a range of exploitation rights (German: Verwertungsrechte) that the individual author would find difficult to exercise without the assistance of a collecting society, which is why the author transfers them. Transferred exploitation rights become usage rights (German: Nutzungsrechte) in the form of licenses.

In Germany, for example, this is regulated through the "law concerning the exercise of author's rights" (German: Urheberrechtswahrnehmungsgesetz) of 9 September 1965. The core of this law is the obligation to administer (Article 6, German: Wahrnehmungszwang) and the obligation to contract (Article 11, German: Abschlusszwang). The former obligation means that collecting societies must prosecute all rights that have been transferred to them. The latter obligation means that they cannot refuse entry to any author (in the case of GEMA: composer, lyricist, or publisher) who has fulfilled all the entry requirements.

GEMA is governed by a double-obligation to contract, that is: 1) on the one hand, it must take on and exercise any usage rights that have been transferred to it from its members; 2) on the other hand, it must also provide licensing in exchange for money to any music-user making a request.

Copyright collecting societies in the European Union usually hold monopolies in their respective national markets, and German law recognizes GEMA as an effective monopoly. German case law has established the so-called GEMA Vermutung, a presumption that works are managed by GEMA due to its effective monopoly position. As such, in Germany the burden of proof is on the accused infringer that the work is not managed by GEMA.

== History ==
=== Antecedents: 1902–1933 ===
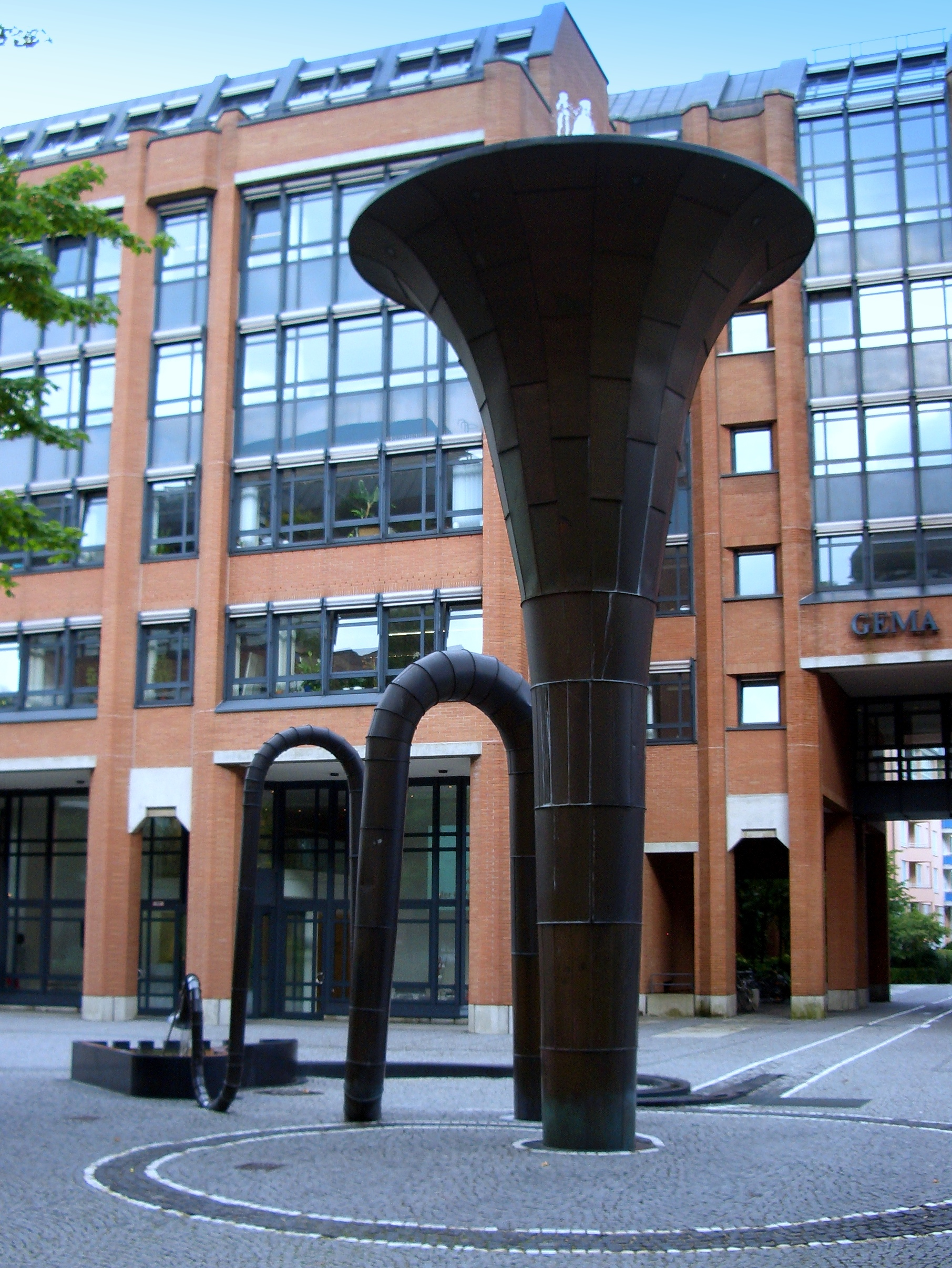
GEMA's Munich offices since 1990, with the Erich Schulze Fountain

Upon coming into effect in January 1902, the Law Concerning Author's Rights to Works of Literature and Musical Art (German: Gesetz betreffend das Urheberrecht an Werken der Literatur und der Tonkunst) first set down in law that the public performance of a musical work required the permission of the author.

The Consortium of German Composers (German: Genossenschaft Deutscher Tonsetzer; GDT) subsequently founded the Institute for Musical Performing Rights (German: Anstalt für musikalische Aufführungsrechte; AFMA) in 1903. This came much later than in other states such as France, where the collecting society SACEM had already been founded in 1851, having its roots in the Agence Centrale, an interest group of musicians and publishers. Founders of the AFMA included Richard Strauss, Hans Sommer and Friedrich Rösch. The GDT was headed by some of the most successful composers of the time, including Engelbert Humperdinck, Georg Schumann and most notably Richard Strauss.

In 1904, the GDT published a memorandum on the spirit and purpose of the AFMA, as there remained a great deal of confusion—as much among musicians as among event promoters and users. A central point of the memo was the following paragraph, most of whose contents now appear in the association rules of GEMA:

"The Institute pursues absolutely no private business purposes. It is only an intermediary agency. It does not collect reserve funds. A trade profit is out of the question. Administrative costs will be deducted from incoming fees, along with a further 10% contribution to the co-operative's relief fund. All remaining income, down to the last penny, will be distributed to the beneficiary composers, lyricists, and publishers."

The time after the foundation of the AFMA was quite turbulent.

In 1909, the GDT founded a second society focused exclusively on the exploitation of mechanical reproduction for phonograph records, the Institute for Mechanical-Musical Rights LLC (German: Anstalt für mechanisch-musikalische Rechte GmbH; AMMRE).

In 1913, the Austrian Society of Authors, Composers, and Music Publishers (German: Gesellschaft der Autoren, Komponisten und Musikverleger; AKM) entered the German market and opened a German branch office.

In 1915, a few members of the GDT split off from the organization and founded GEMA (Genossenschaft zur Verwertung musikalischer Aufführungsrechte, which is not identical to the present-day GEMA). One of the founding members was composer Leon Jessel. In 1916, GEMA and AKM's German branch merged into the Association for the Protection of Musical Performing Rights in Germany (German: Verband zum Schutze musikalischer Aufführungsrechte für Deutschland).

All of this resulted in a situation that had effects contrary to the original interests of authors and promoters as well as users—that is, two competing collecting societies.

In 1930, the GDT (in the form of the AFMA) joined with the Verband under the label Verband zum Schutze musikalischer Aufführungsrechte für Deutschland. However, the business units and facilities of both societies were not impacted by the consolidation. Both collecting societies continued to operate separately—all the while pretending to operate under a unified corporate name.

This came to an end during the Third Reich with the Reich Law regarding the Intermediation of Musical Performance Rights (German: Reichsgesetz über die Vermittlung von Musikaufführungsrechten). The legislator responsible for this law, Joseph Goebbels, did so with the aim of bringing all collecting societies into line and granting them a monopoly position.

=== 1933–2000 ===
On 28 September 1933, the State-Approved Society for the Exploitation of Musical Performing Rights (German: Staatlich genehmigte Gesellschaft zur Verwertung musikalischer Aufführungsrechte; STAGMA) arose out of the Verband zum Schutze musikalischer Afführungsrechte für Deutschland and was issued a monopoly on the exercise of musical performing rights. The still-existing AMMRE was annexed into STAGMA in 1938. The Reichsmusikkammer (English: Reich Chamber of Music), under the direction of then-president Richard Strauss, stipulated in its guidelines that, "non-Aryans are categorically not to be viewed as bearers and stewards of German cultural goods." This amounted to an occupational ban on the approximately 8000 Jews active in the Reichsmusikkammer. STAGMA was tightly enmeshed in the Nazi power structure, and the leading members of STAGMA were die-hard and voluntary Nazis. The CEO of STAGMA was Leo Ritter, who occupied the same position in the original GEMA and was in the habit of giving Hitler's Mein Kampf as a prize to worthy employees.

STAGMA continued its work after the Second World War, but under the title of GEMA (Gesellschaft für musikalische Aufführungs- und mechanische Vervielfältigungsrechte) starting from 24 August 1947. Erich Schulze was the chairman and general director from 1947 to 1989, to whom was dedicated the Erich Schulze Fountain in front of the GEMA headquarters in Munich. Starting in 1950, the chairman of the board of directors was Werner Egk. Both Schulze and Egk already occupied leading positions in STAGMA. Albrecht Dümling's book, Musik hat ihren Wert (English: Music has its Value) was published to mark the 100-year anniversary of the first collection society in Germany. This book shed light on the role of the collecting society after the Nazi era.

In 1950, after the founding of the German Democratic Republic (GDR) and the partition of Germany (and as a consequence of the division in currencies), a society with comparable functions came into being in the GDR, the Institute for the Preservation of Performing and Reproduction Rights in the Area of Music (German: Anstalt zur Wahrung der Aufführungs- und Vervielfältigungsrechte auf dem Gebiet der Musik; AWA).

From 1972 until his death in 1982 composer Franz Grothe served as the chairman of GEMA's board. In 1982, GEMA collected 532.8 Million Deutschmarks.

In 1990, CSU politician Reinhold Kreile succeeded Erich Schulze as chairman of the board. Towards the end of his term of office, he dedicated himself to fighting against digitalization. He characterized GEMA as the "Lighthouse of Culture" and a "rock in the surf of the waves of digitalization." According to him, GEMA succeeded in avoiding "pointless competition." To him, the internet was "nothing but a virtual department store," that should be assimilated in a hostile takeover. He went into retirement at the end of 2005.

After the reunification of Germany, many composers from the former GDR joined GEMA, but not all. The AWA has been dissolved since 1990, but it nonetheless persists as a society under liquidation.

=== 2000–present ===
Harald Heker took over chairmanship of the board of directors in 2007.

== Revenues ==
See Structure and membership for definitions of full member, extraordinary member, and associated member.

	2000	2001	2002	2003	2004	2005	2006	2007	2008	2009	2010
Income in Millions of €	801.4	810.5	812.5	813.6	806.2	852.2	874.4	849.6	823.0	841.1	863.0
Expenditures (Mil. €)	116.9	117.9	118.7	119.4	116.0	120.3	121.7	120.3	122.4	128.0	127.1
Distribution Sum (Mil. €)	684.5	692.6	693.8	694.2	690.2	731.9	752.7	729.3	700.7	713.1	735.9
Cost Ratio	14.6%	14.5%	14.6%	14.7%	14.4%	14.1%	13.9%	14.2%	14.9%	15.2%	14.7%
Effective Payouts to Members (Mil. €)	302.8	317.9	312.0	354.3	328.0	334.5	312.3	325.6	322.9	334.5	299.7
to Full Members (ca. 3,300)	57.6%	57.7%	58.4%	62.8%	58.8%	62.9%	62.3%	61.5%	64.7%	62.9%	64.2%
to Legal Successors	7.6%	7.5%	7.9%	7.2%	7.7%	7.5%	7.8%	7.5%	7.3%	7.5%	6.8%
to Extraordinary Members (ca. 6.400)	9.0%	9.3%	8.2%	7.2%	9.0%	6.8%	5.8%	7.4%	5.8%	5.1%	4.8%
to Associated Members (ca. 55.000)	25.8%	25.6%	25.5%	22.8%	24.6%	22.8%	24.1%	23.6%	22.2%	24.5%	24.1%

After the deduction of expenditures, GEMA's income is paid out to rights holders (approximately 40% to members and 60% to other rights-holders). During the payout process in 2010, an average of ca. €58,000 were apportioned to each full member, ca. €2,270 to each extraordinary member, and ca. €1,300 to each associated member. The internal distribution within these status groups remains confidential. In 2010, 33 (1%) legal successors had full membership, while 6 were extraordinary members (0.1%) and 3,749 associated members (6.9%).

These numbers illustrate that, since the appearance of YouTube on 15 February 2005, absolutely no negative effects on earnings from usage rights can be detected to date. On the contrary, there has even been a considerable increase in income since 2005 (see Blocking of YouTube videos in Germany).

It can also be seen that the share of revenues has continually increased for full members—at the expense of extraordinary members.

== Reciprocal agreements ==
GEMA has entered into reciprocal agreements over performing and broadcasting rights with 73 of its foreign sister companies. For mechanical reproduction rights, GEMA entered into reciprocal agreements with 51 different collecting societies.

A reciprocal agreement facilitates the mutual granting of rights; foreign collecting societies transfer to GEMA the exercise of performance, broadcast, and reproduction rights of their entire inventory within Germany, along with the collection of corresponding usage fees, and in return GEMA grants the same rights and duties to foreign counterparts holding corresponding legal positions in their own territories. In each case, a foreign society operates as a trustee for the rights-exercising collecting society: it has no influence over how and when the collecting society will disburse the collected royalties to its member authors.

As of 2009 and based on a total of 151 agreements, GEMA represents more than 2 Million musical authors from the entire world and maintains data on over 8.5 Million musical works in its works-documentation files.

Collecting societies have joined together internationally into umbrella groups such as the Confédération Internationale des Sociétés d'Auteurs et Compositeurs (CISAC), using this organization as a lobby group to influence governments, international organisations, and the European Community.

== Current debates ==
GEMA often features in discussions about copyright, private copying, webradio and file sharing. For example, the private copying levy on blank recordable media and recording devices was brought into question, especially as it not clear what rights the buyer acquires by paying this sum.

In an online petition initiated by Monika Bestle on 19 May 2003, artists and event-organizers demanded a revision of GEMA's regulations with respect to better transparency, adjusted payment methods and other critical points. The petition was signed by 106,575 citizens and remains under parliamentary review since 17 July 2009.

From 2009 to 2016, many music videos on YouTube were not accessible from a German IP address. This is because, after the expiration of the original contract, YouTube and GEMA had not yet come to an agreement on a new contract (see section Blocking of YouTube videos in Germany below).

On 2 April 2009, a lawsuit took place before the regional court of Munich, in which the plaintiff, German singer Barbara Clear, demanded a court-backed disclosure of GEMA's business practices. According her own statements, Clear paid a total of €80,000 in fees for her concerts between 2004 and 2007 and received around €10,000 in payouts, despite more than half of the performed music being composed, texted, and performed by herself. By her own calculations, she expected a return of approximately €33,000. The verdict, made on 10 June 2010 in the Munich regional court, found in favor of GEMA on all points and, due to incomplete information from Clear, negotiated payments were limited to approximately €23,000 in fees to GEMA and ca. €10,000 in payouts to Clear. The grounds for judgment stated that any claim to payment that may arise does not do so out of the deed of assignment signed between the two parties. On 21 January 2010, the Munich regional higher court of appeal (German: Oberlandesgericht) rejected Clear's appeal against the Munich regional court's (German: Landgericht) verdict in its entirety.

It came to light on 28 May 2010, that two employees along with ten GEMA members were embroiled in a fraud scandal, in which money was paid out for events that never took place. At the same time, another fraud trial was already being litigated against another GEMA employee for another case. At a press briefing related to these cases, Harald Heker proclaimed that, "When a system such as this is circumvented by high criminal energies, such a system is powerless."

GEMA garnered a great deal of attention in January 2011 when it sent a letter to 36,000 Kindergartens, charging them a yearly lump-sum fee of €56 for the photocopying of music scores with children's songs on them. More importantly, the Kindergartens were obligated to maintain an exact itemization of each song used. GEMA replied in a statement that the media had misrepresented the facts. In Bavaria, the dispute was settled by signing a lump-sum agreement amounting to €290,000, which would be paid out from the communal budget. Other states of Germany are also in the process of negotiating similar agreements.

In 2011, GEMA's web presence was the target of two cyber attacks over the failure to reach an agreement with YouTube. The hacktivist group Anonymous claimed responsibility for both attacks, accusing GEMA of making exorbitant demands in regarding the required licensing fees for accessed videos. During the first attack in June 2011, GEMA's server was incapacitated by a denial of service attack. On 22 August, the hackers directly attacked the content of the website, redirecting viewers to an image that played on the dispute with YouTube. Anonymous additionally succeeded in penetrating the company's intranet, collecting usernames and passwords that they later published on Twitter.

On 3 December 2011, another online petition explicitly called for the elimination of Article 13c—the so-called GEMA-Vorbehalt (English: GEMA Clause)—of the Urheberrechtswahrnehmungsgesetz (English: Law concerning the exercise of authors' rights). This section of the law contains a full power of attorney, which GEMA also invokes: "If a rights-holder has not transferred to any collecting society the exercise of his rights of cable retransmission in accordance with Article 20b, Paragraph 1, Sentence 1 of the Urheberrechtswahrnehmungsgesetz, then the collecting society that exercises rights of this sort will be considered to be entitled to exercise these rights."

A radio interview with artist Sven Regener (from the band Element of Crime) caused a stir in March 2012. On Bavarian Radio, Regener railed against "no-cost-culture" in the music industry and vehemently advocated the strengthening of authors' rights and of GEMA (Regener: "We are GEMA, the composers and lyricists"). He accused opponents of copyright with undermining the value of art. He also criticized YouTube, the video portal for the internet company Google. According to him, Google earns billions, but it is not willing to give some of its profits to artists.

In 2012, the organizers of the non-profit organization demo party Evoke decided not to admit any competitors that were members of GEMA or any other international collection society, because otherwise they would incur GEMA licensing fees amounting to €4,500. These costs would endanger the event itself. Another demo party, Revision, made a similar decision in 2013 after having to pay GEMA because of GEMA-registered artists participating in music competitions during the previous year's event.

== Blocking of YouTube videos in Germany ==
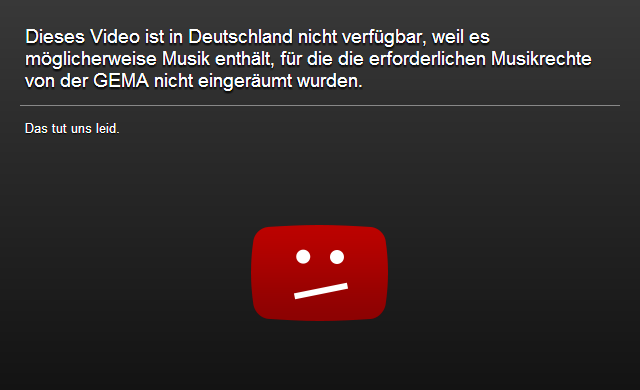
Blocked YouTube videos. Text reads: Unfortunately, this video is not available in Germany, because it may contain music for which GEMA has not granted the respective music rights. Sorry about that.

Music videos for major label artists on YouTube, as well as many videos containing background music, have been unavailable in Germany since the end of March 2009 after the previous agreement had expired and negotiations for a new license agreement were stopped. According to Google, GEMA sought to raise its fee charged to YouTube to a "prohibitive" 12 euro cents per streamed video - a claim that is disputed by GEMA speaker Bettina Müller stating their proposal was 1 euro cent only plus a breakdown by composer. The issue was to be taken up by a California court. Google Inc., the world's biggest Internet search engine company, partly lost a German copyright infringement suit over how much it must do to remove illegal music videos from its YouTube website.

On 20 April 2012, the regional court of Hamburg decided in favor of GEMA in the dispute with YouTube, ordering the removal of seven copyright-protected videos from its platform. Despite its victory, GEMA nonetheless launched an appeal against the verdict on 21 May 2012, because according to GEMA the talks following the verdict remained fruitless, and so the collecting society could not ensure legal certainty for its members. Moreover, GEMA demanded more transparency from the Google-subsidiary in their ongoing negotiations. YouTube also launched an appeal against the 20 April verdict, on the grounds that "the implementation of filters would compromise innovation and freedom of speech."

In February 2014, GEMA won a lawsuit against YouTube at the District Court of Munich which ordered the website to remove blocking messages which claim GEMA is to blame for thousands of videos being unavailable in Germany on copyright grounds.

On 31 October 2016, YouTube agreed to pay an undisclosed amount of money to GEMA for video views of GEMA-protected artists.

On 31 July 2026, the Munich Regional Court I largely upheld GEMA's claims in a copyright dispute with Suno, an AI music generation service. The case concerned six musical compositions that the court found had been reproduced in Suno's AI models and recognisably reproduced in generated outputs. The court ruled that the reproductions were not covered by the applicable text and data mining exception or, for the training copies made in the United States, by the fair use doctrine. It ordered Suno to cease the specified uses and upheld claims for information and damages. The judgment was not final at the time of reporting.

== Criticism ==
As of 5 November 2012, the German parliament had already received 1863 petitions against GEMA.

=== From members ===
- GEMA members with voting rights, who are responsible for the majority of performances, received 62.99% of the disbursements in 2008. Event-organizer Marcus Gloria characterizes these payouts as a non-transparent distribution process. Independent artist Barbara Clear complains that the rental costs of the same concert hall have fluctuated from €2,007 (2004) to €459 (2005) to €1,233 (2006).
- According to contract terms, every member is obligated to register every single one of his/her works that will be released publicly. According to Article 1 of the GEMA deed of assignment, the rights-holder grants GEMA comprehensive exclusive usage rights as a trustee to all of his/her current and future creative works. It is thereafter impossible to publish single works under another license (e.g., a free license). It is likewise impossible to release works for non-commercial use—such as the "nc" varieties available through Creative Commons—which is currently possible in France. In GEMA's view, such arrangements would prevent the society from ensuring the effective and commercial exercise of legal rights, which the EU-Commission should also recognize (according to evidence and business decisions from 1971 to 1974). One can only revoke the transfer of usage rights and manage them oneself in individual law sectors (German: Sparten) and/or territories—and for all works.
- The conventional term of a contract for members of EU-member states is three months. As a general rule, works registered at one point cannot simply be de-registered, because it comes into conflict with other already-standing contracts with its clients. The original six-year term of contract was forbidden by the European Commission in two decisions (1971; 1972), due to the abusive exploitation of monopoly positions, which was confirmed in a verdict by the European Court of Justice. However, six-year contracts remain the norm for citizens of non-EU states.
- Another charge against GEMA is that there is a disparity between the revenues and disbursements for the playback of U-Musik (Unterhaltungsmusik; English: entertainment music, or pop music) versus live musical performances. GEMA explains this difference by pointing out the high acquisition efforts for the latter events. "Playlists" must always be prepared manually and require a signature, in order to count as a legally-valid document.
- In 1998, GEMA introduced new PRO extrapolation procedures. This system for dividing up royalties led to drastic deficits for a portion of members, since oft-played but seldom-reported works became more expensive during the settlement process. Dance bands, solo entertainers, etc. play the standard repertoire but rarely feel compelled to fill out "playlists," since, as non-authors, they will not receive any royalties for the performance. On the other hand, performers of their own works report nearly 100% of their performances, since they are bound to earn royalties from them.
- Authors who perform their own works must also pay music event fees to GEMA, if they are also organizing the event themselves. If more than 80% of their performance consists of their own works, they can use a "net individual invoice" (German: Nettoeinzelverrechnung) to get these fees back—less the handling fees. However, this only applies when all authors participating in the same event are included, which makes no provisions for festivals and supporting acts.
- If an author wishes to make their music available on their own website, they must still pay GEMA fees and fill out the corresponding information sheet, even if the royalties are to be disbursed to them afterwards. This is somewhat different from the policy of the US performing rights societies ASCAP and BMI.
- Since organizers pay concert fees that are calculated using the event venue's size and the admission price, there is a danger that organizer will be saddled with the costs, should the actual sales for the appearance of an artist not cover the incurred GEMA charges. GEMA has implemented a "hardship abatement provision" (German: Härtefallnachlassregel), with which one can apply for a retroactive reduction in licensing costs when an unprofitable event fulfills certain conditions.
- The spokesperson for the German Rock & Pop Music Society, Ole Seelenmeyer, charges that the PRO process was introduced by the executive board in a "hush-hush operation" (German: Nacht-und-Nebel-Aktion) without a resolution from the General Assembly—and which just happened to benefit the members of the executive board, including its chairman at the time, Otto Krause. He accused him of exploitation and personal enrichment, because he sometimes collected sums that were 100 times the incoming licensing fees collected for his old Schlager songs, while rock musicians only earned 10% of the licensing fees their music earned. Furthermore, he claimed that a statistics professor that had been appointed to assess the rationale for the distribution process had had absolutely no expertise in the field of live music and was deliberately misinformed by the executive board. Furthermore, a 2005 verdict by the federal court demanded that the PRO process be subject to a vote by the membership, which has yet to occur. Seelenmeyer also sharply criticized the term "solidarity principle" (German: Solidarprinzip), arguing that it disguises and sugarcoats a planned- and intentionally-unfair distribution process. He cited the former chairman of the GEMA board of directors Jörg Evers, who wrote regarding the introduction of the PRO process that, "For an extrapolation process heavily impacting the income distribution of members to be introduced without a membership resolution is simply intolerable and furthermore against regulations, according to the opinion of many legal experts." Evers further charged: "This paternalism would rob GEMA members of their voting rights regarding an essential domain of their assets. They are almost being deprived of their right of decision by their own trustees!" Evers demanded that: "The only way that the executive board and directorial board can get out of this crisis of confidence that has arisen through the patronization of members lies in the immediate dismissal of the PRO process and the development of a new process with the participation and approval of its members!"
- Edgar Berger, President and international CEO of Sony Music Entertainment outside of the US, criticized the authors' rights practices of GEMA in an interview with the daily newspaper Die Welt on 23 February 2012, questioning why in Germany, in contrast with other countries, no official music videos can be viewed on YouTube: "It's not because of us. We have licensed our content to market players. You need to ask this question to the collecting society GEMA, who is very restrictive in its copyright licensing. We're losing millions in revenue as a result. By the way, this is one of the main reasons why digital music sales in Germany are less prevalent than elsewhere."

=== From users ===
- For the public use of "entertainment" music (German: Unterhaltungsmusik) or dance music (German: Tanzmusik), GEMA assumes that all songs/tracks belong to the GEMA Repertoire by default—until such time as the user submits a completed playlist that indicates which authors are either non-members and/or which tracks are in public domain. In doing so, GEMA is exercising a legally-sanctioned and much-debated reversal of the burden of proof, which is usually termed the GEMA-Vermutung (English: GEMA-assumption).

=== From club managers and disco owners ===
- In April 2012, disco owners were angered by the announcement of GEMA's new licensing fee scheme (dubbed the Tarifreform), because they predicted a more than 1000% increase for them in the year 2013. GEMA did not deny that the new tariffs could mean ten-fold fee hikes for certain venues—especially discotheques—but they were of the opinion that such cases would be isolated. The tariff reforms were based on requests made to GEMA for a simplified tariff structure and a fairer distribution of tariffs between cultural event-organizers and discos. For years discos have paid much less than cultural event-organizers, and there has been a great deal of criticism—including from the political sphere—of the subvention of discos. GEMA also criticized DEHOGA for their one-sided misrepresentation of the issue, charging them with having concealed the impact of the Angemessenheitsregel (English: adequacy rule) cost-abatement, which is based on the actual audience turnout at events. GEMA also argues that 60% of event organizers will pay the same or less under the new tariff system. In particular, smaller clubs will be relieved of paying fees.
- A table on the GEMA website indicates that most of the licensing fees will go down in 2013, but nevertheless a club in Frankfurt with a surface area of 300 m^{2} (3230 sq. ft.) will currently pay a yearly lump sum between €8,000 and €10,000 for GEMA fees. This would constitute a 500% increase in tariffs. According to a fee-calculator on the website of the Bundesverband Deutscher Discotheken und Tanzbetriebe (English: Association of German Discos and Dance Venues), the tariffs will be far higher. However, the estimates generated by this calculator indicate the theoretical maximum flat-rate charge per event. Also, this calculator does not take the Angemessenheitsregel (see above) into account, which gives organizers the ability to have their licensing payments based on the actual number of spectators at their events. The numbers that have been disseminated in the media have greatly distorted public perceptions of the consequences of the tariff reforms. Additionally, there is a growing assumption in the media that discos will be especially reluctant to calculate their costs based on spectator-turnout numbers, since these numbers were not previously monitored and likewise not fully counted.
- By way of a sample fee-estimate, the Bundesvereinigung der Musikveranstalter (English: National Union of Music Event Organizers) calculated that a club with two dance-floors of a combined total surface area of 720 m^{2} (7750 sq. ft.) charging €8 at the door will see a rise in GEMA fees from €21,553 yearly to €147,916. Under the new system, event licensing fees increase by 50% if the music runs longer than five hours. Many other model calculations made the rounds as well, according to which only one-time events such as a marksmanship festivals and very small clubs would actually profit from the new tariff scheme.
- 20 dance club owners came together for the initiative, "Clubs am Main," in order to oppose the new tariff regulations. According to Matthias Morgenstern, the leader of this association and the owner of Tanzhaus West, this new fee structure would lead to Clubsterben (English: club-death). The yearly payments of Frankfurt club Cocoon (club) were slated to jump from €14,000 to €165,000. Another club called Travolta would also see a rise in fee payments from €10,000 to more than €50,000. Tanzhaus West foresees a yearly increase from €1,500 to more than €50,000.
- In Berlin, the techno club Berghain indicated that, starting in 2013, it would have to pay %1400 more in GEMA fees than it did before and therefore was considering closing at the end of 2012. Berghain later announced in mid-August that the club would not shut its doors in the new year, but instead would cancel their planned expansion project, the cultural event-space Kubus.
- On 30 June 2012, the Bundesverband Deutscher Discotheken und Tanzbetriebe (English: Association of German Discos and Dance Venues) organized a "moment of silence" protest, in which the music of 500 clubs and discos in Germany fell silent between 23:55 and midnight. The manager of the association, Stephan Büttner, intended to use this collective gesture of protest to inform patrons and spectators about the impact of the new tariff system.
- According to Ralf Scheffler, owner of the Frankfurt cultural center Batschkapp, GEMA presumes maximum occupancy at events in clubs and discos. But this does not reflect actual/typical turnout. For example, Scheffler's venue has a capacity of 2,000 people, but nonetheless turnout usually hovers at around 500 visitors. But with the new tariff reforms, he will have to pay for 2000 guests, even if they do not show up in those numbers. Due to this, Scheffler plans to quit organizing disco-format events, since he will have to pay €60,000 instead of €3,000 starting in 2013.
- In a letter to GEMA, the head of the Senatskanzlei Berlin (English: Senate Chancellery Berlin), state secretary Björn Böhning, called for a reconsideration of their plans. According to Böhning, Berlin has a creative and innovative music scene, for which clubs and concerts are important. These require affordable licensing fee rates as a basis for their business operations.
- An online petition protesting the GEMA tariff reforms, initiated by event promoter Matthias Rauh (of giga event), was launched shortly after the announcement of the new tariffs in April 2012, closed on 3 October with 305,122 signatures (of which 284,569 were signed with a German address), and presented to Justice Minister Sabine Leutheusser-Schnarrenberger on 13 December 2012. A week later, on 20 December 2012, both GEMA and DEHOGA announced in press statements that they had reached an interim agreement that would delay the implementation of the tariff reforms for a year (until 1 January 2014)—allowing another year to negotiate further over the licensing fee structures—and during the year 2013 all flat-rate event licensing fees will go up by 5% (and, on 1 April 2013, fees will rise a further 10% for discos and clubs).

== German Music Authors' Prize ==
Since 2009, GEMA has been granting the annual German Music Authors' Prize (German: Deutscher Musikautorenpreis). With the motto, "Authors Honor Authors" (German: Autoren ehren Autoren), the award ceremony takes place in Berlin with about 300 guests in attendance from the worlds of music, culture, business, media, and politics. This award recognizes composers and lyricists for the outstanding quality of their work. The award is conferred in ten categories, and the honorees are selected by an independent jury of experts: composers, lyricists, and producers from a variety of musical genres. The award for the "up-and-coming" category comes with a monetary prize amounting to €10,000. All other categories bestow non-monetary awards.

== See also ==
- Bureau International de l'Edition Mecanique
- Cultural Commons Collecting Society
- GÜFA
- Recording Industry Association of America (RIAA)
