= International Standard Recording Code =

Code uniquely identifying an audio recording

The International Standard Recording Code (ISRC) is an international standard code for uniquely identifying sound recordings and music video recordings. The code was developed by the recording industry in conjunction with the ISO technical committee 46, subcommittee 9 (TC 46/SC 9), which codified the standard as ISO 3901 in 1986, and updated it in 2001.

An ISRC identifies a particular recording, not the work (composition and lyrical content) itself. Therefore, different recordings, edits, and remixes of the same work should each have their own ISRC. Works are identified by ISWC. Recordings remastered or revised in other ways are usually assigned a new ISRC.

== History ==
ISO 3901 was completed in 1986. In 1988, the IFPI recommended that its member companies adopt ISRCs for music videos. In 1989, the ISO designated the IFPI as the registration authority for ISRCs. The IFPI, in turn, delegated part of the administration of ISRCs to several dozen national agencies, which allocate ISRCs to both record companies and individuals. The national agencies began assigning ISRCs for music videos in August 1989.

The Japanese recording industry began encoding ISRCs on audio CDs in November 1989. The IFPI and the Recording Industry Association of America (RIAA) then developed detailed recommendations for this practice, and for ISRC assignment in general. The IFPI adopted the recommendations in March 1991 and they went into effect for IFPI members on 1 January 1992.

== Format ==
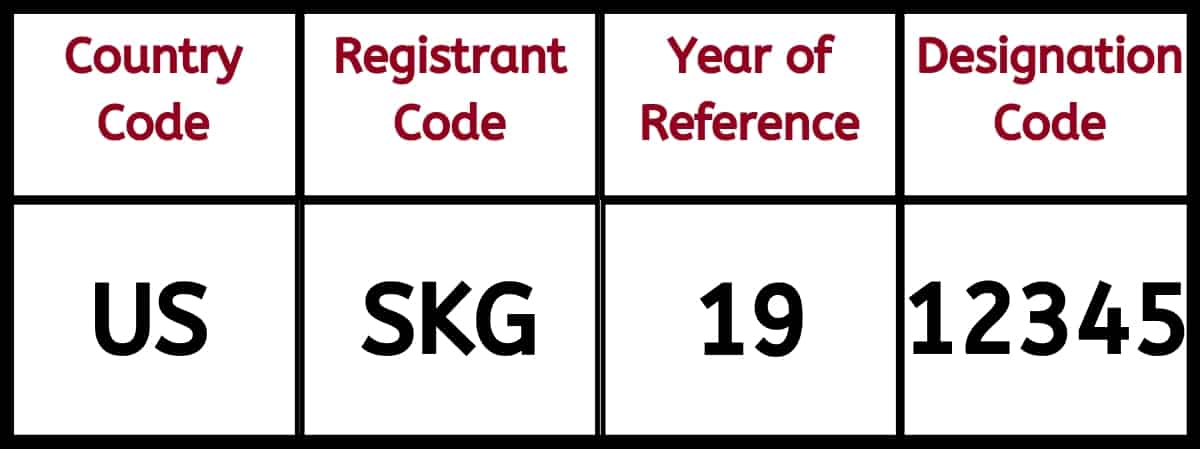
ISRC code example

ISRC codes are always 12 characters long, in the form "CC-XXX-YY-NNNNN". The hyphens are not part of the ISRC code itself, but codes are often presented that way in print to make them easier to read. The four parts are as follows:

- "CC" is the appropriate two-character country code for the ISRC issuer. The code is assigned according to the ISO 3166-1-Alpha-2 standard. (High demand for ISRCs within the United States has caused the supply of available registrant codes to become exhausted; after December 6, 2010, new registrants in the US use country code "QM, QZ, or QT". The codes "CP" and "DG" are reserved for further overflow, and "ZZ" is reserved for codes assigned by the International ISRC Agency. Further additions continue to be made.)
- "XXX" is a three character alphanumeric registrant code of the ISRC issuer. This code by itself does NOT uniquely identify the ISRC issuer as the same 3-digit registrant code may be used in various countries for different issuers. To uniquely identify an issuer, the country code and registrant code must be used together.
- "YY" represent the last two digits of the reference year – the year that the ISRC was assigned to the recording. This is not necessarily the date the recording was made.
- "NNNNN" is a 5-digit number that identifies the particular sound or video recording, unique within the scope of the reference year.

Example:

A recording of the song "Monkeys Spinning Monkeys" by American composer Kevin MacLeod has been allocated the ISRC code USUAN1400011:

- US for United States
- UAN for Incompetech
- 14 for 2014
- 00011 as the unique id identifying this particular recording

== Embedding ISRC in files ==
ISRC may be embedded in most file formats as metadata. Example formats include MP3, M4A, AAC, FLAC, OGG, and WAV for audio and MP4, M4V, or MKV for video.

- The standard for the ID3v2.2 tag that was designed for use in MP3 files, was published in March 1998 and defined a way to embed ISRCs in a 'TSRC' frame.
- In August 2012, Barry Grint and the European Broadcasting Union published a specification for embedding ISRCs in Broadcast Wave Format, a WAV-with-metadata format.
- Audio CDs defined by the Red Book may also embed ISRC as part of the CD-Text information.

Metadata formats are not generally interchangeable as format converters may fail to translate the data. As a result, it is recommended to perform the embedding separately for each format.

== Obtaining ISRCs ==
The provision of ISRCs is overseen by appointed national ISRC agencies. These national ISRC agencies issue codes directly to the public and may also utilize authorized ISRC Managers to issue ISRCs. In the United States, the appointed agency is RIAA. ISRC codes can be obtained in large blocks directly from RIAA for an administrative fee, in quantities as little as 1 from ISRC.com, or in conjunction with other music-related services from other authorized ISRC managers. In territories where there is no national ISRC agency, users can obtain ISRC codes directly from IFPI or from ISRC.com, Quansic and Sound Credit.

== See also ==
- Global Release Identifier (GRid), a unique identifier for musical releases
- International Article Number or EAN-13 (also known as European Article Number) the Media Catalog Number code stored on an audio CD
- International Standard Book Number (ISBN), a similar unique identifier for books
- International Standard Musical Work Code (ISWC), a unique identifier for musical works such as classical compositions
- Universal Product Code (UPC), Universal Product Code
- Label Code (LC), a unique 4- or 5-digit identifier for music labels
