= List of copyright collection societies =

This is a list of international and national copyright collection societies and companies, also called "copyright collectives".

== Global ==
- Association of International Collective Management of Audiovisual Works (AGICOA)
- Bureau International des Sociétés Gérant les Droits D'Enregistrement et les Reproduction Mecanique (BIEM)
- Christian Copyright Licensing International (CCLI)
- International Confederation of Societies of Authors and Composers (CISAC)
- International Federation of the Phonographic Industry (IFPI)
- Motion Picture Licensing Corporation (MPLC)

== Asia ==
=== Azerbaijan ===
- Copyright Agency of Azerbaijan Republic (Azərbaycan Respublikası Müəllif Hüquqları Agentliyi)

=== Brunei ===
- Bruneian Authors & Composers (BEAT) Berhad

=== China ===
- Music Copyright Society of China (MCSC)

=== India ===
- Cinefil Producers Performance Limited
- Indian Reprographic Rights Organisation (IRRO)
- Recorded Music Performance Ltd (RMPL)
- Indian Performing Right Society Ltd (IPRS)
- Phonographic Performance Limited (PPL India)

=== Indonesia ===
- Wahana Musik Indonesia (WAMI)

=== Hong Kong ===
- Composers and Authors Society of Hong Kong Ltd. (CASH)

=== Japan ===
Music

- Japanese Society for Rights of Authors, Composers and Publishers (JASRAC) - Largest CMO in Japanese music industries.
- NexTone Inc. - Merged between Japan Rights Clearance Inc. and e-License in 2016.
- Music People's Nest (MPN)

Visual arts

- Japan Art, Photograph and Graphic Art Copyright Organization (APG-Japan) - A member of the International Confederation of Societies of Authors and Composers.
- Japanese Society for Protecting Artists' Rights (JASPAR) - Non-Japanese visual arts such as Marc Chagall, Salvador Dalí and Le Corbusier.
- Société pour la Protection des Droits Artistiques (SPDA) - Handles works of Pablo Picasso and Henri Matisse. Downsized after the JASPAR's spin-off in 2012.
- Japan Photographic Copyright Association (JPCA) - Represents ten photographic business associations such as Japan Professional Photographers Society.

Videos

- audiovisual Rights management association (aRma) - Established by Japan Association of Music Enterprises, Federation of Music Producers Japan, Geidankyo (meaning consortium of entertainment performers associations of Japan).
- Performers' Rights Entrustment (PRE) - Collects licensing fees of TV programs.

Publications

- Japan Publishing Copyright Association (JPCA) - Issued a strong statement against Google Book Search Settlement Agreement.
- Japan Reproduction Rights Center (JRRC) - Mainly on behalf of paper-based publishers.
- Rental Rights Administration Center for Publications (RRAC)

=== Jordan ===
- MusicNation

=== Malaysia ===
- Public Performance Malaysia (PPM) - A not-for-profit Collective Management Organization (CMO), represents all eligible Malaysian recording companies and international recording companies who have exclusively licensed PPM members to control their rights in Malaysia.

=== Philippines ===
- Filipino Society of Composers, Authors and Publishers (FILSCAP)

=== Russia ===
- Russian Organization for Intellectual Property VOIS (Collective society related rights)
- Russian Organization for Multimedia and Digital Systems (ROMS, or POMC in Russian; aka Russian Multimedia and Internet Society)
- Russian Author's Society (RAO)

=== South Korea ===
- Korea Music Copyright Association (KOMCA)

=== Thailand ===
- Music Copyright Thailand (MCT)

=== United Arab Emirates ===
- MusicNation

=== Vietnam ===
- Vietnam Center for Protection of Music Copyright (VCPMC)

== Africa ==
=== Chad ===
- Syndicat National de l'Édition Phonographique (SNEP), the National Syndicate of Phonographic Publishing

=== Ghana ===
- Ghana Music Rights Organization (GHAMRO)

=== Kenya ===
- Music Copyright Society of Kenya (MCSK)

=== South Africa ===
- Dramatic, Artistic and Literary Rights Organisation (DALRO)
- Southern African Music Rights Organisation (SAMRO)

=== Uganda ===
- Uganda Performing Right Society

=== SOMALILAND ===
- MUSIC Copyright PRODUCTION SOCIETY (MCPS)
- Haatuf And Intero Music Production Society (HIMPS)

== Europe ==
- Association of European Performers' Organisations AEPO-ARTIS
- https://digital-strategy.ec.europa.eu/en/library/collective-rights-management-directive-publication-collective-management-organisations-and

=== Austria ===
- Autoren, Komponisten und Musikverleger Genossenschaft mit beschränkter Haftung (AKM) – (English: Authors, Composers and Music Publishers Registered Cooperative with Limited Liability)

=== Basque Country (Spain) ===
- Euskal Egileen Eskubideen Kudeaketa Elkartea (EKKI) – (English: Basque Workers' Rights Management Association)

=== Belgium ===
- Société d'Auteurs Belge – Belgische Auteurs Maatschappij (SABAM) – (English: Belgian Society of Authors, Composers and Publishers)

=== Bulgaria ===
- Музикаутор (MUSICAUTOR) – (English: Bulgarian Society of Composers, Authors and Music Publishers)

=== Croatia ===
- Hrvatsko društvo skladatelja (HDS) – (English: Croatian Composers' Society)

=== Cyprus ===
- PRS for Music (PRS) – formerly MCPS-PRS Alliance

=== Czech Republic ===
- Divadelní, literární, audiovizuální agentura (DILIA) – (English: Theatre, Literary and Audiovisual Agency)
- Ochranný svaz autorský (OSA), (GESTOR) – (English: Protective Association of Authors for Rights to Musical Works), (the Union for the Protection of Authorship of Czech Republic)
- nezávislá společnost výkonných umělců a výrobců zvukových a zvukově-obrazových záznamů (INTERGRAM) – (English: Independent Society of Performing Artists and Producers of Sound and Audiovisual Recordings)
- Ochranná organizace autorská – Sdružení autorů (OOA-S) – (English: Copyright Protection Organisation – Authors' Association)
- Ochranná asociace zvukařů – autorů (OAZA) – (English: Sound Engineers' Copyright Association)

=== Denmark ===
- Gramex
- KODA
- Nordisk Copyright Bureau

=== Estonia ===
- Eesti Autorite Ühing (EAÜ)

=== Finland ===
- Teosto (authors and composers of musical works)

=== France ===
- Société des auteurs et compositeurs dramatiques (SACD)
- Société des auteurs, compositeurs et éditeurs de musique (SACEM) English: Society of Authors, Composers, and Music Editors
- Société de la Propriété Artistique des Dessins et Modèles (SPADEM), visual artists - defunct
- Société des auteurs dans les arts graphiques et plastiques (ADAGP), visual artists
- Syndicat National de l'Édition Phonographique (SNEP), the National Syndicate of Phonographic Publishing
- Organisme de gestion collective des droits des artistes-interprètes (ADAMI), for performers
- Société de Perception et de Distribution des Droits des Artistes-Interprètes (SPEDIDAM), for performers

=== Germany ===
- Gesellschaft für musikalische Aufführungs- und mechanische Vervielfältigungsrechte (GEMA)
- Gesellschaft zur Übernahme und Wahrnehmung von Filmaufführungsrechten mbH (GÜFA)
- Cultural Commons Collecting Society SCE mbH (C3S) (planned)
- Verwertungsgesellschaft Bild-Kunst – Artists, Photographers und Filmmakers.
- VG Wort – Verwertungsgesellschaft Wort (English: Collecting Society Wort).
- Gesellschaft zur Verwertung von Leistungsschutzrechten – GVL (Performing artists, Producers of sound recordings).

=== Greece ===
- GEA-GRAMMO, ERATO, APOLLON: Producers, Musicians, Singers (neighboring rights).

=== Republic of Ireland ===
- Irish Music Rights Organisation (IMRO)

=== Italy ===
- Società Italiana degli Autori ed Editori (SIAE) (English: Italian Society of Authors and Publishers).
- Rete Artisti Spettacolo Innovazione (RASI) (English: Italian Society of Artists and Performers). www.reteartistispettacolo.it

=== Lithuania ===
- Gretutinių teisių asociacija GRETA [Association of related rights]

=== The Netherlands ===
- Buma/Stemra

=== Norway ===
- TONO (Copyright collective for authors and composers of musical works)

=== Poland ===
There are fourteen officially recognized copyright collection societies in Poland, among them:

- ZAiKS (Polish Society of Authors and Composers)
- ZPAV (Polish Society of the Phonographic Industry)
- ZPAP (Association of Polish Artists and Designers)
- SARP (Association of Polish Architects)

=== Portugal ===
- Sociedade Portuguesa de Autores (SPA) English: Portuguese Society of Authors

=== Slovenia ===
- AIPA - Collecting Society of Authors, Performers and Producers of Audiovisual Works in Slovenia
- IPF - Collective Management of the Rights of Performers and Phonogram Producers in Slovenia
- SAZAS - Collective Management Society for Musical Authors' Rights in Slovenia

=== Slovakia ===
- SOZA (Slovak Performing Rights Society)

=== Spain ===
- SGAE: Sociedad General de Autores y Editores (English: General Society of Authors and Editors).

=== Sweden ===
- Svenska Tonsättares Internationella Musikbyrå (STIM) (English: Swedish Performing Rights Society).
- IFPI Sweden - International Federation of the Phonographic Industry (Swedish Society of Music Companies)

=== Switzerland ===
- Motion Picture Licensing Company Switzerland
- ProLitteris
- SUISA – Schweizerische Gesellschaft für die Rechte der Urheber musikalischer Werke (English: Swiss Society for the Rights of Authors of Musical Works).
- Swissperform

=== Ukraine ===
- Ukrainian Agency of Copyright and Related Rights (UACRR)

=== United Kingdom ===
- Authors' Licensing and Collecting Society (ALCS)
- Artists' Collecting Society (ACS)
- Christian Copyright Licensing International, United Kingdom
- Copyright Licensing Agency (CLA)
- Design and Artists Copyright Society (DACS)
- Directors UK (D-UK), formerly the Directors' and Producers' Rights Society (DPRS)
- Motion Picture Licensing Corporation (MPLC)
- Mechanical-Copyright Protection Society (MCPS)
- PRS for Music, formerly MCPS-PRS Alliance
- Phonographic Performance Limited (PPL)
- Publishers' Licensing Services (PLS)
- Picture Industry Collecting Society for Effective Licensing (PICSEL)

== Middle East ==
=== Israel ===
- Society of Authors, Composers and Music Publishers in Israel (ACUM) (performance rights society, representing authors, poets, lyricists, composers, arrangers, and music publishers)
- Tali Rights, the Israeli Scriptwriters & Directors Collecting society

=== Turkey ===
- Türkiye Musiki Eseri Sahipleri Meslek Birliği (MESAM)
- Müzik Yorumcuları Birliği (MÜYORBİR)
- Musiki Eseri Sahipleri Grubu Meslek Birliği (MSG)

=== Lebanon ===
- Société des auteurs, compositeurs et éditeurs de musique (SACEM)

== North America ==
=== Canada ===
- Access Copyright – The Canadian Copyright Licensing Agency (formerly CanCopy)
- American Federation of Musicians of the United States and Canada (AFM)
- Canadian Artists' Representation Copyright Collective (CARCC)
- Canadian Musical Reproduction Rights Agency Ltd (CMRRA Ltd)
- Canadian Private Copying Collective (CPCC)
- Playwrights Guild of Canada (PGC) (formerly Playwrights Union of Canada)
- Re:Sound Music Licensing Company
- Société des auteurs et compositeurs dramatiques (SACD)
- Society of Composers, Authors and Music Publishers of Canada (SOCAN)

=== United States ===
- AFM & SAG-AFTRA Intellectual Property Rights Distribution Fund
- INDR Music Association (rechanged to INDR U.S. Rights Holders Association) Manage PROs & CMOs acting as an Independent Consultant
- AllTrack (AllTrack Performing Rights), a US-based performance right organization
- American Society for Collective Rights Licensing (ASCRL)(Visual Materials)
- American Society of Composers, Authors and Publishers (ASCAP)
- Artists Rights Society
- BMI (Broadcast Music Inc.)
- Christian Copyright Licensing International
- Copyright Clearance Center (CCC)
- Harry Fox Agency, a US-based music rights agency for reproduction rights
- Mechanical Licensing Collective (the MLC), the US based mechanical rights organization designated by the US Copyright Office.
- Music Reports, a US-based music rights licensing company
- Motion Picture Licensing Corporation (MPLC)
- SESAC, a US-based performance rights association
- SoundExchange, a digital performance rights association (non-interactive radio)
- Pro Music Rights, a US-based performance rights association

== South America ==
=== Argentina ===
- Sociedad Argentina de Autores y Compositores de Música (SADAIC)
- Sociedad Argentina de Gestión de Actores Intérpretes (SAGAI)

=== Brazil ===
- Escritório Central de Arrecadação e Distribuição (ECAD)
- Motion Picture Licensing Corporation Brasil
- Associação Brasileira de Música e Artes (ABRAMUS)
- Sociedade Brasileira de Autores, Compositores e Escritores de Músic (SBACEM)
- Sociedade Brasileira de Administração e Proteção de Direitos Intelectuais (SOCINPRO)
- União Brasileira de Compositores (UBC)
- Associação_de_Músicos,_Arranjadores_e_Regentes (AMAR)
- Associação de Intérpretes e Músicos (ASSIM)
- Sociedade Independente de Compositores e Autores Musicais (SICAM)

=== Chile ===
- Sociedad Chilena de Derechos de Autor (SCD)

=== Uruguay ===
- Asociación General de Autores del Uruguay (AGADU)

=== Colombia ===
- Dirección Nacional de Derechos de Autor (DNDA)
- Sociedad de Autores y Compositores (SAYCO)
- Asociación Colombiana de Interpretes y Productores (ACIMPRO)

== Oceania ==
=== Australasia ===
- Australasian Mechanical Copyright Owners Society (AMCOS)
- Australasian Performing Right Association (APRA)

=== Australia ===
- Australian Writers Guild Authorship Collecting Society (AWGACS)
- Copyright Agency Limited (CAL)
- Phonographic Performance Company of Australia (PPCA)
- Screenrights: The Audio Visual Copyright Society (Audio-Visual Collecting Society Ltd)
