= Public domain music =

Sound arranged in time, that is free for all to improve on

Prelude and Fugue in A minor, BWV 543 by Johann Sebastian Bach

Public domain music is music to which no exclusive intellectual property rights apply. The public domain music can be freely shared, modified, redistributed without the consumers needing to attribute the author or pay any fees. According to Wikimedia Foundation, free licensing of content encourages creativity and removes barriers to access for disadvantaged communities, and improves freedom of knowledge. Public domain music can be available in various formats, for example, in sheet format or as a recording.

== Background ==
The length of copyright protection varies from country to country, but music, along with most other creative works, generally enters the public domain 50 to 75 years after the death of the creator. Generally, copyright separately protects "musical compositions" (melodies, rhythms, lyrics, etc. as written in sheet music) and "sound recordings" (performances as recorded in audio files, CDs, and records).

In the United States, although case law regarding copyright abandonment is inconsistent, the law has generally assumed that copyright owners may dedicate their works to the public domain; however, this practice remains exceedingly rare. The most common way for a work to enter the public domain is for its copyright term to expire—this is the case for musical compositions published prior to 1 January 1931. Sound recordings, on the other hand, were generally protected until at least 2022. Before 1976, sound recordings were not protected by national copyright law in the United States; instead, the protection of these works was under the jurisdiction of the state and local governments. This resulted in great variation in laws across the country, with some jurisdictions extending perpetual protection to sound recordings. Although the Copyright Act of 1976 provided federal copyright protection to sound recordings created after 1972, it otherwise left state protections in place until at least 2067. The 2018 Music Modernization Act further nationalized the system by extending federal copyright protection to pre-1972 sound recordings while also shortening their term of protection. Sound recordings made before 1923 entered the public domain on 1 January 2022; recordings made between 1923 and 1946 will be protected for 100 years after publication; recordings made between 1947 and 1956 will be protected for 110 years; and all recordings made from 1957 to 15 February 1972 will have their protection terminate on 15 February 2067.

In the European Union and Canada, sound recordings were copyrighted for 50 years until 2013. On 1 January 2013, the Beatles' single "Love Me Do" entered the public domain. As of November 2013, European sound recordings are now protected for 70 years, which is not retroactive. In 2015, Canada changed the copyright length to 70 years.

On 8 February 2016, a court ruled that the children's song "Happy Birthday to You" was in the public domain and Warner/Chappell Music was required to pay $14 million to the song's licensees.

In October 2020, American humorist Tom Lehrer released his entire catalogue, dating back to the 1950s, into the public domain.

== Copyright ==
For music, the involved rights are:

- Authors (composers, lyricists) — e.g. CISAC members, AR: SADAIC, DE: GEMA, GB: PRS, US: SESAC, BMI, ASCAP
- Performer
  - Mechanical rights — e.g. BIEM members (mechanical rights collecting societies), AR: SADAIC, DE: GEMA, GB: MCPS, US: HFA
    - BIEM is the international organisation representing mechanical rights societies. Mechanical rights societies exist in most countries. They license the reproduction of songs (including musical, literary and dramatic works). Their members are composers, authors and publishers and their clients are record companies and other users of recorded music. They also license mechanical aspects of the downloading of music via the Internet.
  - Live performance — DE: GVL
- Publisher — e.g. IFPI members, AR: CAPIF, GB: BPI, US: RIAA

== Process ==
There are several ways that a piece of music can be in the public domain:

- If all rights in it have failed, as is the case for old pieces of music such as George Gershwin's 1924 composition Rhapsody in Blue.
- If the rights-holders have placed it into the public domain, for example through copyright abandonment or the Creative Commons Zero dedication.
- If no rights ever applied to the music, possibly because the music predates the existence of intellectual property, as is the case for most folk music, or because it is otherwise ineligible for protection, as is the case for music performed by the various ensembles of the US military.

If a piece of music does not fall within the public domain and is instead under copyright protection, most countries' laws forbid the reproduction, public performance, distribution, and creation of derivative works without the permission of the copyright holder. Under compulsory licensing laws, some of these actions may in fact be lawful, but the infringing party would then be liable to pay royalties to the copyright holder for the use of their work.

Rhapsodies, Op. 79 (Brahms)

== Sources ==
Inherently, all historical musical works (pre-1931) in the U.S are public domain. Classical sheet music, for example, is widely available for free use and reproduction. Some more current works are also available for free use through public works projects such as Internet Archive. This and similar projects aim to preserve and make readily available thousands of public domain music files, many of which have been recorded by projects dedicated to recording music for public use.

Music on the Creative Commons:

The Creative Commons is a nonprofit organization created for the purpose of housing the public domain. The Commons allows copyright owners to dedicate their works to the public domain either immediately or, with the "Founders' Copyright" (originally created in the first American copyright law in 1790), can obtain an exclusive license for 14 or 28 years (if renewed) of copyright protection in exchange for selling their work to the Commons for one dollar after that protection has expired. Copyright owners can fill out an online application at https://creativecommons.org/ in order to apply.

Public domain musical works and recordings can be uploaded onto the Wikimedia Commons website.

== See also ==
- Public domain film
- List of public domain tangos
- Copyright Term Extension Act
- LibriVox, an online digital library of free public domain audiobooks.
- Copyright collective
- Performance rights organisation
- Royalty free music
