= Soza =

Soza may refer to:

- Suza, Iran, the capital of Shahab District in Qeshm County, Hormozgan Province, Iran
- Sosa, Portugal, a village in Portugal
- Slovak Performing Rights Society (Slovenský ochranný zväz autorský pre práva k hudobným dielam, SOZA), a state-authorized collecting society and performance rights organisation for musical works in Slovakia
