= Design and Artists Copyright Society =

British rights management company

The Design and Artists Copyright Society (DACS) is a British company limited by guarantee. It is a not-for-profit collective management organisation established in 1983 and in operation since 1984.

It collects and distributes royalties to visual artists and their beneficiaries, and negotiates licensing agreements between them and third parties, including Tate, Penguin, Warner Music Group and Alexander McQueen. By 2024 DACS had distributed £200 million in royalties. DACS retains a percentage of royalties collected for operating costs, including advocating for visual artists' rights through campaigning work and Parliamentary representation, plus sharing visual arts copyright information.

== History ==
In 1984 a group of artists and lawyers founded DACS to: support artists by managing their copyright, collect the royalties owed to artists for the use of their work.

Founding members included Elaine Kowalsky, Sir Eduardo Paolozzi, Susan Hiller and David Shepherd. Inspired by the French artists' copyright society Société de la Propriété Artistique des Dessins et Modèles (SPADEM), they utilised their experience at ArtLaw and the Visual Artists' Rights Society.

DACS led a successful campaign to introduce the Artist's Resale Right in the UK, which came into force in 2006.

== Operation and aim ==
DACS collect and distribute royalties to artists through their 3 main services: DACS ARR, DACS Payback and DACS Licensing. By 2024 DACS had distributed £200 million in royalties. In 2025, it paid £17.6 million in royalties to over 100,000 artists and estates, and arranged 1900 licences for its members.

It represents artists including David Hockney, Damien Hirst and Tracey Emin, and its licensing customers include BBC, Christopher Kane, Phaidon, Netflix, Sky Arts, Shakespeare's Globe, Sony, Saatchi & Saatchi, Tate and UNIQLO.

DACS' vision is for a society which recognises, respects and values all artists.

== Advocacy ==
DACS campaigns for the protection of artists' rights and royalties, on behalf of artists in the UK and internationally. Recent advocacy work includes:

- Artificial intelligence
- Artists Resale Right
- Collective licensing
- Freelance work and fair pay
- Representing visual artists in Parliament

DACS, together with a-n The Artists Information Company and CVAN Contemporary Visual Arts Network England, provides the group with secretariat support for the All Party Parliamentary Group for Visual Arts & Artists. Additionally, through the Alliance for Intellectual Property, it is a member of the All Party Parliamentary Group for IP and also attends the All Party Parliamentary Group for AI.

== Governance ==
DACS is a not-for-profit company limited by guarantee with a board of 14 directors and multiple voting members who guide its mission.

== Network ==
DACS represents 180,000 visual artists and artists' estates worldwide through an international network of collecting societies. It is a member of the following organisations:

- Alliance for Intellectual Property
- Audiovisual Licensing Agency (AVLA)
- British Copyright Council (BCC)
- Copyright Licensing Agency (CLA)
- Creative UK
- Creators' Rights Alliance (CRA)
- Educational Recording Agency (ERA)
- European Visual Artists (EVA)
- International Authors Forum (IAF)
- International Council of Creators of Graphic, Plastic and Photographic Arts (CIAGP)
- International Federation of Reproduction Rights Organisations (IFRRO)
- Gallery Climate Coalition (GCC)
- FRANK Fair Artists Pay
- International Confederation of Societies of Authors and Composers (CISAC)
- Online Art (OLA)
