= Music Copyright Society of Kenya =

Kenyan organisation

The Music Copyright Society of Kenya (MCSK) is a copyright collection society for Kenya. It collects royalties on behalf of authors, composers, arrangers, and publishers of music. It collects royalties for public performances and mechanical reproductions.

In Kenya, the Kenya Copyright Board supervises the collection and disbursement of royalties. Related organizations include the Performers Rights Society of Kenya and the Kenya Association of Music Producers.

In 2015, a number of artists including Elijah Wainaina Mira, Francis Jumba, and Carolyne Wanjiru Ndiba filed suit against MCSK, the Copyright Board, and other organizations claiming the right to collect royalties for their own works. The Kenya Copyright Board has also formally complained that MCSK's disbursement of royalties disbursed to artists has been decreasing for several years, falling to 58.9% of collected revenue, well below the 70% standard established by the Kenya Copyright Board. The MCSK has had problems from the Copyright Board in the past; in 2011 it was "deregistered" as an official collecting society.

== See also ==
- Copyright collective
- Performance rights organisation
- List of copyright collection societies
