= Society of Authors, Composers and Music Publishers in Israel =

Israeli non-profit copyright collective

- אגודת קומפוזיטורים, ומחברים ומו"לים
- Abbreviation: ACUM
- Formation: 1936; 90 years ago
- Founded at: Tel Aviv, israel
- Type: Non-profit
- Purpose: Collective rights management
- Members: 10,125 (2016)
- Official language: Hebrew
- Affiliations: International Confederation of Societies of Authors and Composers (CISAC); International Bureau of Societies Administering Mechanical Rights (BIAM)
- Website: acum.org.il

The Society of Authors, Composers and Music Publishers in Israel (Hebrew: אגודת קומפוזיטורים, ומחברים ומו"לים), also known by its Hebrew acronym ACUM (Hebrew: אקו"ם), is a non-profit copyright collective which engages in collective rights management for authors, poets, lyricists, composers, arrangers, and music publishers in Israel. As a member of the International Confederation of Societies of Authors and Composers (CISAC), ACUM is affiliated with more than 100 similar rights organizations around the world, with which it engages in reciprocal royalty collection agreements. It also holds an annual prize ceremony which honors authors and musicians in many categories, including lifetime achievement.

As of 2016, the organization has 10,125 members, of which 149 are publishers. More than 1.7 million Israeli and foreign works are registered in its database. In 2004, ACUM was the subject of a precedent-setting decision by the Israel Antitrust Authority which determined that its arrangement for licensing members' work amounted to a restrictive agreement, and that ACUM was essentially a monopoly. Since 2011, the group has operated under limitations imposed by the Antitrust Tribunal.

== History ==
ACUM was incorporated in Mandatory Palestine in 1936, although it had been operating on an informal basis since 1934. The organization originally represented Jewish authors and musicians.

In ACUM's early years, the Palestine Broadcasting Service was its primary source of royalties. ACUM did not have a workable system in place to collect royalties from café owners, nor did it distribute royalties among its members in a systematic fashion.

As ACUM improved its enforcement of royalty payments for musical works performed in Israel, it began signing reciprocal agreements with foreign counterparts. A 1965 Billboard report on the signing of an agreement between ACUM and the GEMA performing rights organization of Germany noted:

According to Israeli copyright law, royalties must be paid to ACUM for reproduction of any kind of music in the rooms of officials, political parties, ministries and settlements (kibbutzim), or over the radio or on records and tape. Clubs, tourist buses and aircraft are encompassed by the copyright law. Even guitar music played in the evenings at the kibuzzims is subject to ACUM royalties.

ACUM is a member of the International Confederation of Societies of Authors and Composers (CISAC) and the International Bureau of Societies Administering Mechanical Rights, both of which are recognized by the UN's World Intellectual Property Organization. Through its CISAC membership, ACUM is affiliated with more than 100 similar rights organizations around the world, collecting royalties on their behalf for work performed in Israel, and receiving royalties for Israeli members' works performed abroad.

== Antitrust ruling ==
In 2004, the Israel Antitrust Authority declared that the arrangement which ACUM had to license its members' work amounted to a restrictive agreement, and that ACUM was essentially "a monopoly in the markets for the management of broadcast rights, public performance rights, copying rights, recording rights and rights to synchronise musical pieces, including the provision of licenses for the use of these rights". ACUM appealed this decision to the Antitrust Tribunal in July 2004, which rejected the appeal in 2008. In May 2009 the Supreme Court of Israel dismissed ACUM's appeal. The case served as a precedent for other copyright management organizations in Israel to be subject to the approval of the Antitrust Tribunal.

In 2008, in keeping with the demand for transparency, ACUM hired a public relations firm and held its first-ever press conference. It reported that in 2008 it had collected NIS 76 million in royalties which it passed on to its members, an increase of 28% over the previous year. Organizational revenue was reported as NIS 99.4 million.

In 2011, the Antitrust Tribunal approved ACUM's arrangements with artists for a period of five years, subject to a series of limitations. This approval was renewed in 2016, with additional requirements for ACUM to regularly report on its revenues and artist compensation, as well as to indicate which copyrights have expired in its public database.

== Membership ==
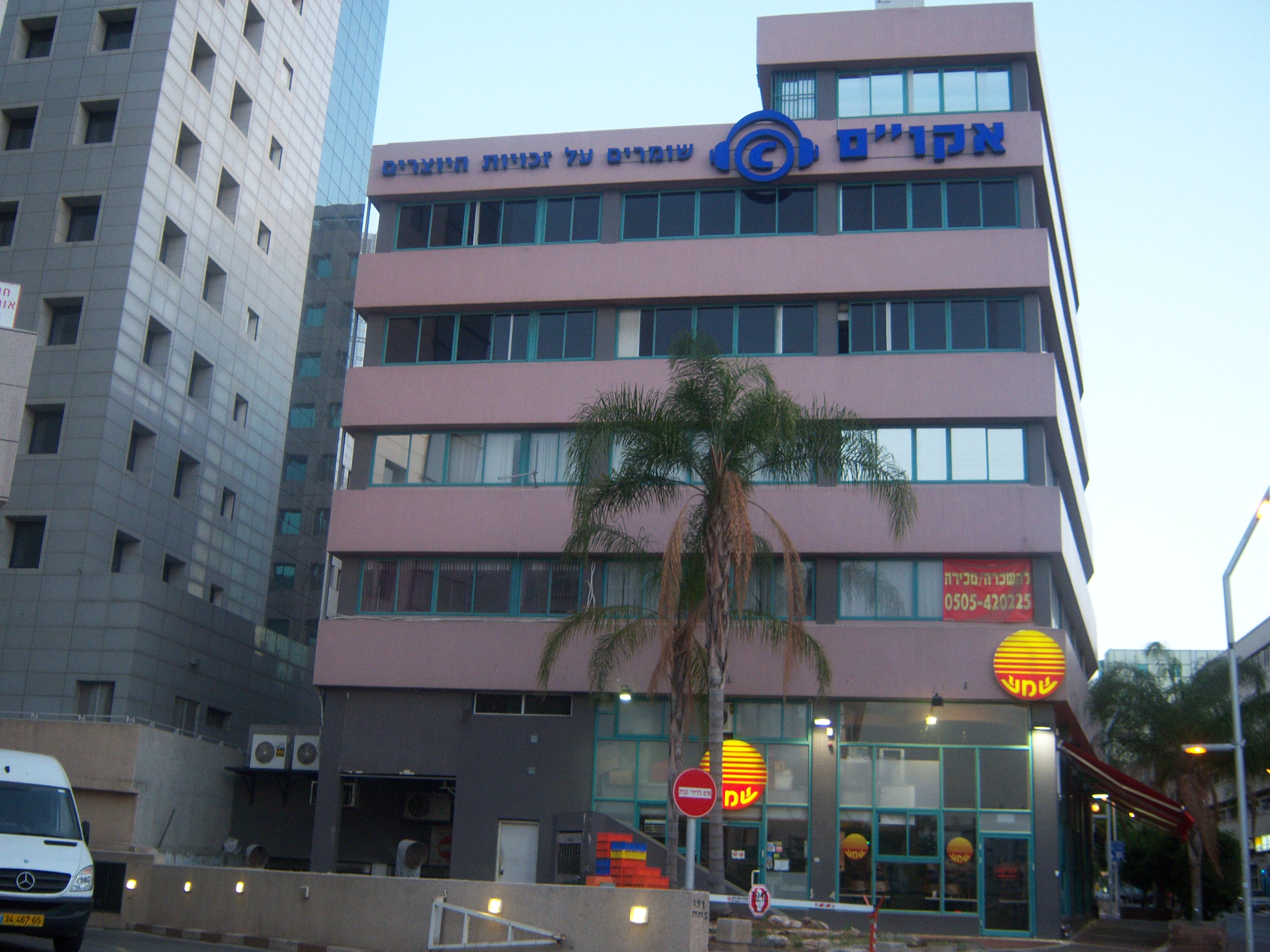
ACUM building in Ramat Gan, Israel

As of 2016, the organization has 10,125 members, of which 149 are publishers. There are no membership dues. To qualify for membership, artists must be active in the fields of literature and music, and have their works "used on a public basis".

ACUM provides its members with "copyright protection and collective arrangements authorising the use of works, collection of royalties for such use, and legal advice". Its services include the granting of licenses to internet sites whose servers are based in Israel, allowing them to broadcast, download, and display copyrighted works online. In 2004 ACUM won an Israel Supreme Court decision allowing it to license musical works for commercial use online.

== Creative studio ==
In 2012, ACUM opened a creative studio in which young musicians can perform royalty-free and also receive part of the profits from ticket sales. Located in a hangar in the Tel Aviv Port, the studio provides amplifiers, lighting, musical instruments, and a rehearsal stage. The 150-seat facility is also used by the organization for workshops and master classes.

== ACUM Award ==
The ACUM Award ceremony started in 1958 as a small competition for works that were submitted anonymously. The competition has developed over the years, today offering a wide range of prizes for literature and classical music, and for popular music. As of 2018, ACUM's lifetime achievement award includes a cash prize of $10,000.

=== Awards controversy ===
In 2014 the board of directors decided to downgrade a lifetime achievement award to a general prize for "contribution to music" for singer Ariel Zilber, whose political views are right-wing and pro-settler. The board was pressured to downgrade the prize by left-wing protestors, among them Dalia Rabin, daughter of the slain Prime Minister of Israel Yitzhak Rabin. Singer Achinoam Nini refused to accept her award from ACUM in response to the decision to honor Zilber. The board's decision drew condemnation from right-wing politicians Avigdor Lieberman, Foreign Minister, Naftali Bennett, Minister of the Economy, and Limor Livnat, Minister of Culture, as well as from supporters of art, music, and freedom of speech.

== Directors ==
Directors of ACUM have included:

- Ovad Efrat (current)
- Yorek Ben-David
- Yedidyah Admon
- Menachem Avidom, 1955–1980

== Sources ==
- Birnhack, Michael D. (2012). Colonial Copyright: Intellectual Property in Mandate Palestine. Oxford University Press. ISBN 9780191637193.
- Fleisher, Robert; Fleisher, Robert Jay (1997). Twenty Israeli Composers: Voices of a Culture. Wayne State University Press. ISBN 9780814326480.
- White, Gil (2009), "Israel", in Campbell, Dennis (ed.), The Internet [2009] – I: Laws and Regulatory Regimes, Lulu.com, ISBN 9780557090143
