= Sociedad General de Autores y Editores =

Spanish copyright collective

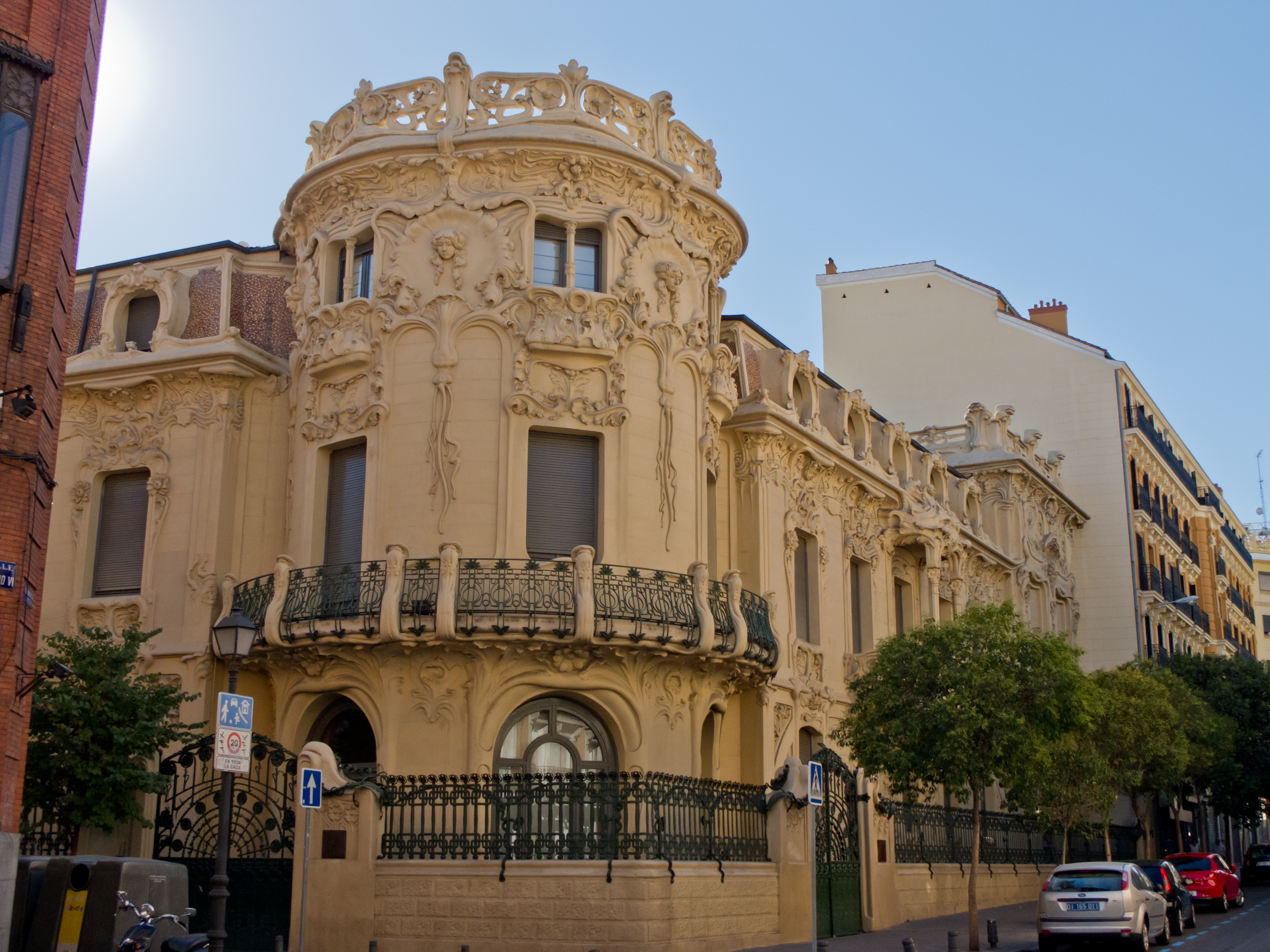
- SGAE's headquarters are in the Palacio Longoria building, in Madrid.

The Spanish Society of Authors and Publishers (Sociedad General de Autores y Editores, SGAE) is the main collecting society for songwriters, composers and music publishers in Spain. It is similar to AGADU, ASCAP, GEMA, SADAIC, SACEM and SAYCO. The philologist, poet, composer, scriptwriter, movie and television director and producer Antón Reixa (1957) is the chairman of the Board of Directors since May 2012. SGAE was founded in 1889 as Society of Authors of Spain. In 1995, its name changed to Society of Authors and Publishers, seeking to accommodate cultural editors.

SGAE comprises more than 100,000 music, audiovisual and dramatic creators. Created in 1899, its main mission is the protection of its members' rights for the use of their works throughout the world. These uses include mechanical reproduction, public performance, synchronization and many other forms of musical distribution. This process culminates in the collection and subsequent royalty distribution to its members.

With over 430 employees, more than 200 representatives in Spain, plus offices in the US, Brazil, Mexico, Cuba and Argentina, SGAE protects the rights of more than two million members from all over the world. It does so through reciprocal representation agreements entered into with 150 foreign societies which, in turn, administer and protect its members rights in their respective territories.

SGAE is not only an organism for the management of rights. Through its Fundación Autor, or in collaboration with cultural institutions, SGAE enhances its promise to promote the continuous formation of its members and the diffusion of their works around the world, aiding for their well-being, including the start-up of an assistance program with multiple features and social benefits.

In 2018, SGAE was involved in a television scam known as "La Rueda", where TV broadcasters played more of their personally owned music in late-night slots, leaving tens of millions of dollars less each year for other parties whose music is played on Spanish TV.

== Digital canon ==
One of the main activities of the SGAE is the collection of a blank media tax called “canon”. This tax is aimed to compensate authors for private copies of their work and was incorporated into Spanish law by Law 22/1987 of November 11, Intellectual Property. This law recognized the right of users to make private copies. The fee was intended to levy countervailing audio and video devices such as tapes, stereos or televisions. Its latest version, called “digital canon”, placed the SGAE in the middle of a controversy when trying to extrapolate this charge to digital devices such as CD, DVD, external hard drives and cell phones capable of playing music. The amount payable ranges from 0.17 euros on the price of a CD-R up to 227 euros to be paid to purchase a copier.

=== Opponents ===
The digital canon was implemented on 18 December 2007, and it introduced the payment of a fee as compensation for private copying that both individuals and companies must pay regardless of the intended use for the device. This has been a main argument of opponents of the blank media tax, who believe that the indiscriminate application of the canon does not respect the presumption of innocence of consumers. However, the Spanish Intellectual Property Law recognizes the right to private copying, so there is no offense to commit, and therefore there is no presumption of innocence. The digital canon has grown unpopular in Spain and the two main Spanish organizations of Internet users had collected three million signatures by February 2010 calling for the abolition of the tax. Many Internet users defend their right to make private copies of the purchased contents without paying any additional fees.

In July 2018, in response to the "Rueda" scandal, Warner/Chappell, Sony/ATV, Universal Music Publishing Group, BMG Rights Management, and Peermusic have attempted to pull their catalogues from SGAE's repertoire by 2019, and may refuse to license their music for broadcast. These publishers account for 60% of Spain's broadcasting rights.

=== Defenders ===
The private copying levy has traditionally been seen as a compensation for the original authors, transferring payment from analog media to digital media. Apart from the controversy surrounding it in Spain, the tax common among European countries and is seen as a compensation accepted in all European Union countries, provided by Directive 2001/29/EC, which in Article 5 authorizes the various member countries to enter the private copying exception provided that the legislation adequately compensate the original authors. Ireland, United Kingdom, Luxembourg, Malta and Cyprus do not recognize the right to private copying, so no fee is charged. Other countries have opted to compensate the authors directly. This is the case of Norway, where 40 million euros were spent for this purpose during 2010. Outside Europe, the fee is also charged in countries such as Canada, while in the U.S., recording media devices are taxed at a rate of 3%.

== Legal dispute ==
In 2004, the SGAE claimed EUR 16,759.25 to the company PADAWAN, dedicated to the marketing of multimedia devices such as CD, DVD or MP3, to compensate for devices sold between September 2002 and September 2004. PADAWAN took the case to trial, and the Court of Barcelona consulted with the Court of Justice of the European Union if the Spanish tax system for the cultural industry is compatible with Community law. The Court of Justice of European Union General Counsel, Verica Trstenjak, ruled that the application of digital canon in Spain is illegal when imposed indiscriminately on all recording and playing equipment and materials purchased by companies and not only those who presumably are intended for making private copies, the only case in which the digital canon would comply with European legislation. The law states that under no circumstances the canon can be imposed to companies and professionals that clearly acquire the devices for purposes unrelated to private copying.

Following the European resolution, digital canon has been strongly questioned by Internet users and some political parties. To achieve parliamentary support for the so-called “Sinde Law”, after the Culture Ministry, Ángeles González-Sinde, approved by the Senate Finance Committee on February 1, 2011, the Spanish Government committed to eliminate the digital fee within three months after the approval of the law, a condition required by the main opposition party, the Partido Popular.

== Controversies ==
The SGAE has been involved in several controversies, like charging a fine of €96 to a middle school for trying to make a theatrical play whose rights belonged to Federico García Lorca's heirs. The SGAE denied access to any information or communication to the owners of the rights to the school. The school administrators by their own account finally found the copyright holders, the Centro Dramático Nacional, (whose responsibles weren't informed of the situation at all by their SGAE representatives) and they gladly agreed to the school petition without any charge. However, the SGAE replied that they only acted like intermediaries and had no authority to stop demanding the payment for the copyright of registered works, unless the author or the owners requested so.

Finally, Lorca's nephew, Manuel Fernández Montesinos, contacted the Ramón Menéndez Pidal middle school to inform that they could play "Bodas de sangre" without any charges. A few days later, Montesinos wrote again to the School Principal refusing to lose the copyright's tax since the play was to be represented in a professional theatre and not at the school.

The SGAE has also claimed copyright for works of authors deceased more than 70 years ago at the time of the claim, a condition that, under European law, deems the works to be of public domain. According to the councils of Zalamea de la Serena (Badajoz), and Fuente Obejuna (Córdoba), the company claimed 24,000 and 30,000 euros respectively to represent the classic Spanish dramas "El alcalde de Zalamea" and "Fuenteovejuna", whose authors died centuries ago. The problem arises from the fact that many of the represented classic plays are adaptations to current Spanish from an original work's ancient language, so in those cases a collection of fees is required from the adapter. In both cases, the SGAE rejected the accusations and stated that, in the case of Zalamea de la Serena, the requested quantity was 95 euros.

A common description of SGAE by independent songwriters in Spain is that the organization is made up of pirates who prefer to keep and spend royalty money owed to the writers.

== Embezzlement investigation ==
On 1 July 2011, eight members of the SGAE, including the president, Teddy Bautista, were arrested and charged with embezzlement. The Investigation Committee estimated that as much as 87 million euros were embezzled directly or indirectly from 1997 to 2011.

== See also ==
- Bureau International de l'Edition Mecanique
- Confédération Internationale des Sociétés d´Auteurs et Compositeurs
- Performance rights organisation
