= AllTrack =

Music licensing and royalty administration business

AllTrack is a US-based performing rights organization (PRO) that represents independent artists, songwriters, composers, producers, and publishers for the licensing and collection of their performing rights royalties. Its members are compensated when their original songs (also commonly referred to as compositions or works) are publicly performed in more than 120 countries around the world.

== History ==
AllTrack Performing Rights was founded by Hayden Bower in 2017, launched in beta in 2018 and officially launched in 2019. AllTrack's team of executives were previously employed at SESAC, Rumblefish, Tunecore, Songs, Bicycle and Bug Music.

In 2024, AllTrack was accepted into the membership of the International Confederation of Societies of Authors and Composers (CISAC) as a rights management entity. With this affiliation, AllTrack became the fourth performing rights organization in the United States to join CISAC, alongside ASCAP, BMI, and SESAC.

In September 2024, AllTrack launched a suite of application programming interfaces (APIs) for integration with creator-centric platforms, including streaming services, user-generated content (UGC) platforms, distributors, and publishing administrators. The tools enable in-platform performing rights organization (PRO) registration, songwriter profile authentication, access to song-level metadata, display of songwriting credits, and real-time clearance of performing rights. Tidal became the first service to implement the integration, allowing unaffiliated creators to register with AllTrack and link their metadata directly through its platform.

In November 2024, AllTrack launched a mechanical rights division, becoming the first performing rights organization (PRO) in the United States to provide integrated performance and mechanical royalty collection services through a single platform. The expansion allowed songwriters and publishers to collect worldwide royalties from streaming, downloads, and physical formats without registering with multiple organizations.

In 2025, AllTrack expanded its operations into neighboring rights royalty administration through the acquisition of the neighboring rights assets of Number13, a music licensing and rights management firm founded by former SoundExchange executive Wade Metzler. Following the acquisition, Metzler joined AllTrack to lead its new neighboring rights division. The move made AllTrack the only U.S.-based performing rights organization to directly administer and collect neighboring rights royalties for artists and labels, in addition to its existing performance and mechanical royalty services.

Through the integration of Number13’s technology and relationships with local collective management organizations, AllTrack began offering global neighboring rights collection services, representing recordings by artists such as Bruce Springsteen, Elvis Costello, Counting Crows, Lucinda Williams, and others.
