= SOZA =

Performance rights organisation in Slovakia

Slovak Performing Rights Society Slovenský ochranný zväz autorský
- Abbreviation: SOZA
- Formation: 1939 (SAS)
- Type: PRO
- Headquarters: Bratislava, Slovakia, EU
- Members: CISAC; BIEM; GESAC
- Official language: Slovak
- Website: soza.sk

Slovak Performing Rights Society (SOZA) is a performance rights organisation representing local groups of copyright and related rights owners of Slovakia.

A member of CISAC (1970), BIEM (1973) and GESAC (2005), SOZA was initially founded as Slovenský autorský sväz hudobných skladateľov, spisovateľov a nakladateľov (SAS), or else Slovak Union of Authors for Composing, Writing and Publishing in 1939.

== See also ==
- List of copyright collection societies
