= MPLC =

MPLC may refer to:

- Medium pressure liquid chromatography, a type of column chromatography
- Motion Picture Licensing Corporation, an international, independent copyright licensing agency
- Movimento Popular de Libertação de Cabinda (Popular Movement for the Liberation of Cabinda), a militant separatist group fighting for the independence of Cabinda from Angola
- Man Portable Mine Clearing system
