= Crowley Broadcast Analysis =

Brazilian research institution

Crowley Broadcast Analysis is an official institution of research, which monitors the radios in Brazil since 1992. Currently, the company provides data to the Escritório Central de Arrecadação e Distribuição (ECAD) and the Pro-Música Brasil and besides being the standard for the Phonographic Industry in the country. In August 2009, it also exclusively started providing the charts for Billboard Brasil that is based on grid-base radios with 250 stations surveyed in ten cities.

== Charts ==
In 2018, the company launched the Crowley Charts website, which compiles tables, that were published weekly by Billboard Brasil. The site offers the Top 100 Brasil, with the 100 most played songs of the week, and tables with the 10 most played songs by genre (National Pop, International Pop, National Pop/Rock, Pagode, Sertanejo, Forró, Funk/Black Music/Rap, Latin and MPB).
