= Copyright rightsholder =

Copyright rightsholder may refer to:

- Copyright collective
- Trade association § Copyright trade groups
