= SGAE =

SGAE may refer to:

- Secrétariat Général des Affaires Européennes, a ministry in the government of France
- Sociedad General de Autores y Editores, a Spanish music copyright organization
