= Société des Auteurs et Compositeurs Dramatiques =

French collecting society for authors and composers

SACD
- Company type: Société civile
- Founded: July 3, 1777; 248 years ago in Paris, France
- Founder: Pierre-Augustin Caron de Beaumarchais
- Headquarters: Paris, France
- Owner: Pascal Rogard
- Website: https://www.sacd.fr

SACD, founded as Société des Auteurs et Compositeurs Dramatiques (English: Society of Dramatic Authors and Composers) on 7 March 1829, is a French collecting society, undertaking collective rights management for authors. The Society manages, promotes and protects the performance rights of theatrical, audiovisual or photographic works for their creators by collecting royalties and authorising performances. It's also one of the main lobbies against "droit d'auteur" (copyright) changes and to protect the activities of collective rights management societies.

== History ==
The SACD was founded in 1829 by French dramatist and miscellaneous writer Charles-Guillaume Étienne. The idea of society protecting the rights of the authors dates back to Beaumarchais, who founded his own organization in 1777.

== Current activities ==
In 2006 the Society represented about 44,000 members in the performing arts and audiovisual sectors. The entire SACD repertoire currently comprises about 500,000 works, from the performing arts and the audiovisual sector.

The SACD lobbies in favor of governmental action meant to discourage unauthorized use of copyrighted works over the Internet (DADVSI, HADOPI) and against proposals to establish a "global license", authorizing French Internet users to copy copyrighted works in exchange for a flat fee on the Internet subscription.

In 2009, the SACD hosted a petition in favor of Roman Polanski, following his arrest for failure to appear in a California court for sentencing after pleading guilty to one count of statutory rape of a 13-year-old girl.

The SACD gives a prize to one of the feature films competing at the Critics' Week sidebar of the Cannes Film Festival.
