= Society of Authors ZAiKS =

Cultural organisation in Poland

The Society of Authors ZAiKS (Polish: Stowarzyszenie Autorów ZAiKS, where the acronym stands for the Society′s original founding name, Society of Authors and Stage Composers, Polish: Związek Autorów i Kompozytorów Scenicznych or ZAiKS), established 1918, was for many years the sole legal Polish copyright collective, and has remained the dominant one, following the loss of its de facto government-granted monopoly in 1995 as a result of entry into force of the new copyright law of Poland. It is a member of BIEM, CISAC and GESAC. Its headquarters are located in Warsaw at the ″House Under the Kings″, the former seat of the Załuski Library.

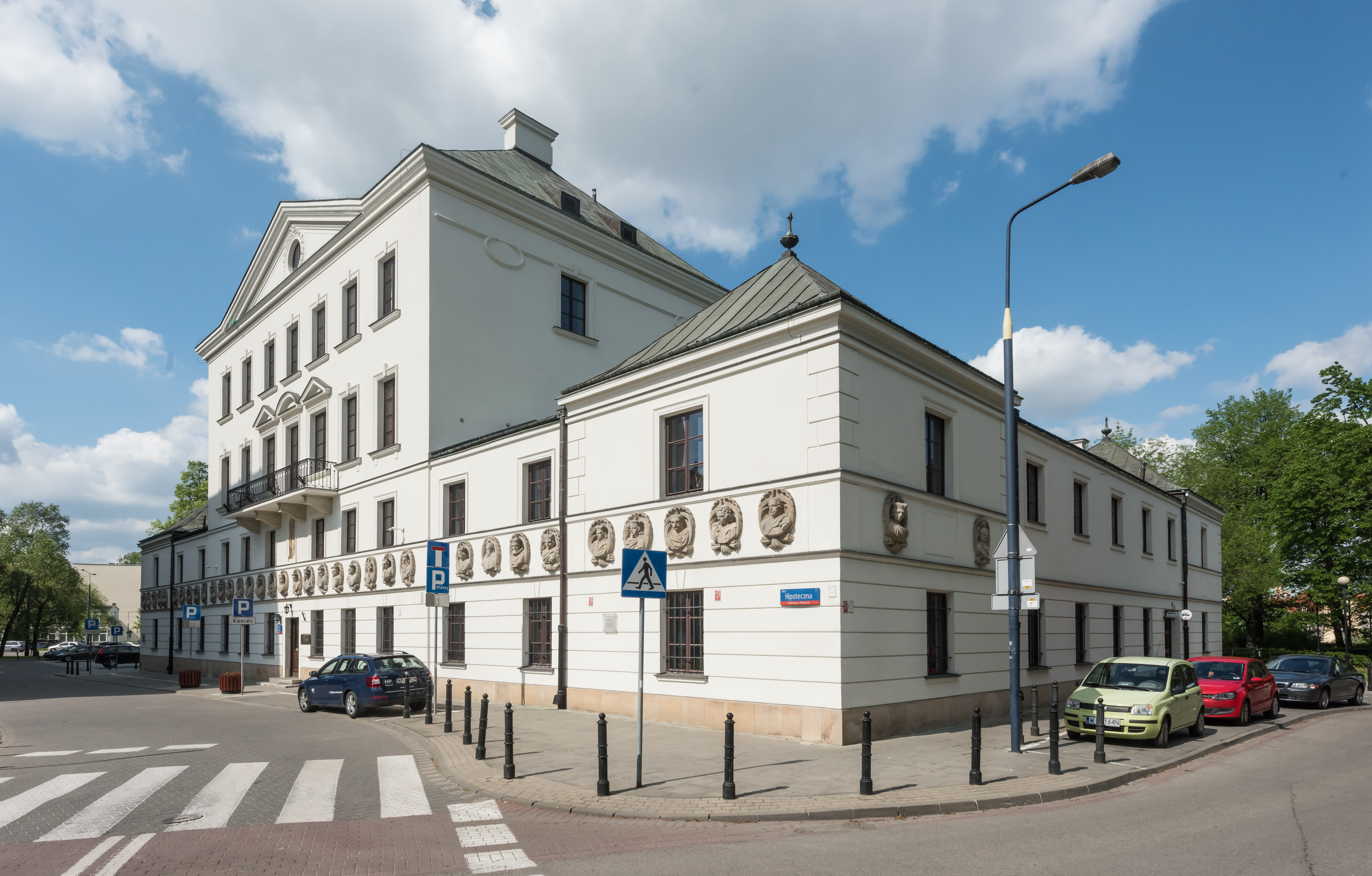
"House Under the Kings", the headquarters of the Society in Warsaw

The organization represents artists and composers with the mission of "defending their copyright rights". It has been subject to some criticism, for example for claiming rights to collect royalties for artists who are not its members, as well as for monopolistic practices. At one point the organization declared that it wants to collect royalties for works distributed under free licenses, but has since withdrawn from that position. Andrzej Wlast was vice president until 1939.

== See also ==
- Copyright law of Poland
