= AGATA (organization) =

Lithuanian non-profit performance rights organization

- Abbreviation: AGATA
- Formation: 1999
- Type: NGO
- Legal status: Association
- Headquarters: Vilnius
- Location: Lithuania
- Official language: Lithuanian
- Director: Agnė Begetė
- Affiliations: IFPI
- Website: AGATA.lt

Lithuanian Neighbouring Rights Association (Lithuanian: Lietuvos gretutinių teisių asociacija), known as AGATA, is a nonprofit, performance rights organization established in 1999 that deals with the licensing and rights of music publishers and performers in Lithuania. In 2011, it became the country's designated body for the collection of compensation for writers, performers, actors and producers. AGATA is an associated member of the International Federation of the Phonographic Industry (IFPI). Since September 2018, AGATA publishes weekly top 100 charts of the most popular albums and singles in Lithuania. The charts are based on sales and streams from Spotify, Deezer, Apple Music, iTunes, Google Play and Shazam.

== Certifications ==
In 2023, AGATA reinstated the Gold, Platinum, and Diamond awards for album sales, with the certifications based on both album sales and downloads. The required thresholds were set at 2.5 million listens for Gold, 4 million for Platinum, and 6 million for Diamond. In 2024, the certification program was expanded to include singles, with awards based on streaming data, excluding YouTube. The thresholds for singles were aligned with those for albums: 2.5 million streams for Gold and 4 million for Platinum.
