= MÜYORBİR =

MÜYORBİR (full name in Turkish: Müzik Yorumcuları Meslek Birliği, "Professional Union of Music Interpreters") is a copyright collective for musicians in Turkey. The organization was founded in 2000 by 51 musicians under Section 42 of Turkey's Intellectual and Artistic Works Law 5846 as a Neighboring Rights Collecting Society. MÜYORBİR became a legal entity on 19 April 2000 following approval by the Ministry of Culture and Tourism.

MÜYORBİR represents 95% of the Turkish music industry's recorded works. It is the only collective society in Turkey authorized to license its members music content under Section 80 of Turkey's Intellectual and Artistic Works Law.

== Activities ==
- To pursue administrative and legal protections for members' rights.
- To collect fees and compensation arising from the use of members' performances.
- To further the organization's goals by building relationships with individuals, public institutions and other organizations, in Turkey and abroad.
- To create professional publications and organize training for members and non-members.
- As resolved by its General Assembly, to establish social institutions, set up relief funds and perform other social services for members.
- To monitor usage of members' recordings for commercial purposes and take necessary measures for prevent unauthorized use.
- To resolve disputes, make and implementation agreements on the use of members' performances and to cooperate with professional associations in related fields.

== International Relations ==
MÜYORBİR was admitted as a member of the Societies' Council for the Collective Management of Performers' Rights (SCAPR) at the organization's 35th general assembly in 2010. This followed MÜYORBİR's earlier observer status within SCAPR. This relationship provides MÜYORBİR with international representation.

=== Bilateral Agreements ===
- APOLLON (Greece)
- ERATO (Greece)

== See also ==
- List of copyright collection societies
