= Rumblefish Inc. =

Music licensing company

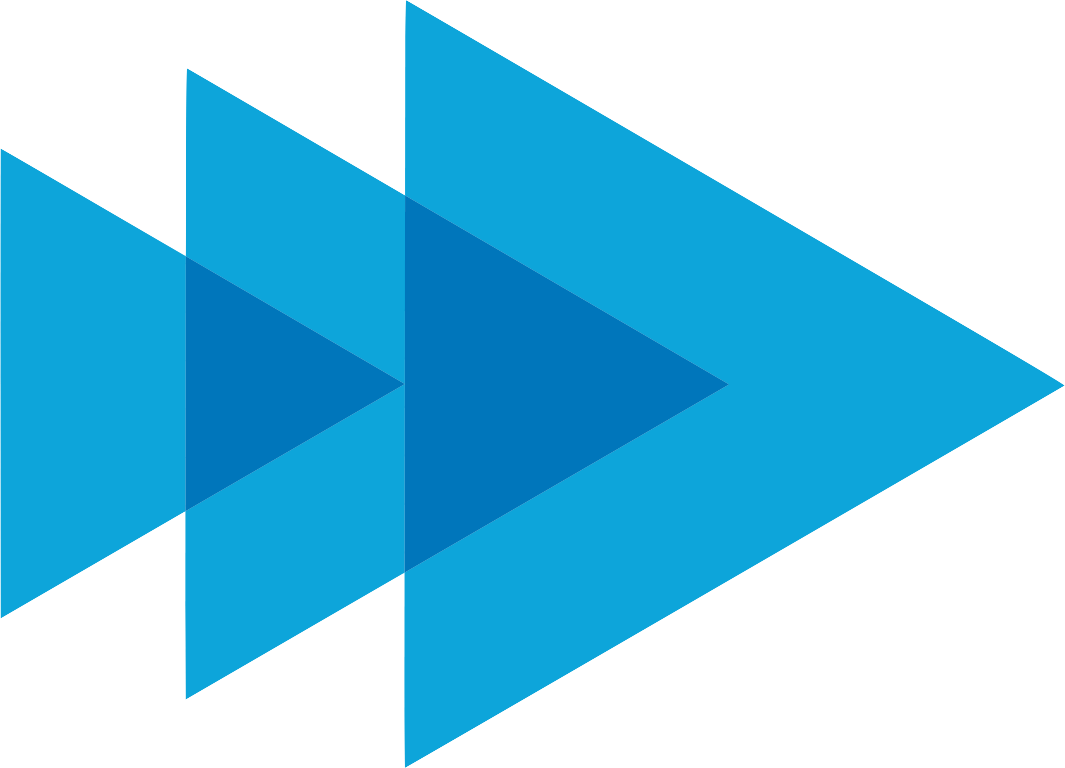
- Type: Private
- Industry: Music licensing
- Owner: SESAC Music Group
- Website: www.rumblefish.com

Rumblefish Inc. is a music licensing company specializing in synchronization licensing with a focus on micro-licensing and online network monetization, such as with YouTube's Content ID. It covers over 1.8 million pieces of music and licenses over 20,000 soundtracks on more than nine million social videos.

== History ==
In 2010, Rumblefish partnered with YouTube to allow YouTube video creators to pay a small fee to legally license music for their videos.

In late 2011, Rumblefish entered into a partnership with CD Baby to license the music from their independent artists for movies, TV shows, ads, video games, apps, and YouTube.

In early 2013, Rumblefish acquired Catalogik, a music rights administration software as a service (SaaS).

== Controversy ==
Rumblefish has generated controversy by sending copyright takedown notices to YouTube alleging copyright violations in videos' soundtracks, even when the user has written rights to the usage of a particular song or recording, or when users are musicians posting their own videos of songs they wrote and performed themselves and to which they own all copyright.

In early 2012, Rumblefish falsely claimed ownership of birdsong heard in the background of a YouTube video, resulting in the video being taken down. When the owner of the video objected, Rumblefish reiterated its claim. Rumblefish CEO Paul Anthony later admitted that mistakes were made, and stated that Rumblefish would be improving its process.

In 2015, Rumblefish falsely filed a copyright claim on the public-domain song America the Beautiful, as performed by the United States Navy Band (whose performances are all likewise public-domain).
