= University of Oxford v. Rameshwari Photocopy Service =

2016 Indian copyright case

- Court: Delhi High Court
- Full case name: The Chancellor, Masters and Scholars of the University of Oxford and Ors. Versus Rameshwari Photocopy Services & Ors.
- Decided: 9 December 2016

Case history
- Appealed from: Single-judge bench of the Delhi High Court

Court membership
- Judges sitting: Justice Pradeep Nandrajog, Justice Yogesh Khanna

Case opinions
- Decision by: Justice Pradeep Nandrajog

The Chancellor, Masters and Scholars of the University of Oxford and Others v. Rameshwari Photocopy Services and Others, colloquially known as the DU Photocopy Case, was an Indian copyright law court case in the Delhi High Court filed by academic publishers Oxford University Press, Cambridge University Press and Taylor & Francis, against Rameshwari Photocopy Services and the University of Delhi, the former being a shop licensed to operate within the precincts of the Delhi School of Economics, University of Delhi. The plaintiffs alleged copyright infringement and sought a permanent injunction, and the defendants successfully argued that their actions fell within the bounds of fair dealing.

== Background ==
Rameshwari Photocopy Service was established in 1998 and owned by Dharampal Singh.

Although initially denied by the University of Delhi, some of the professors teaching the Delhi School of Economics had prepared course packs consisting of pages from books published by the plaintiffs, and Rameshwari Photocopy Service was tasked with photocopying and binding these pages, and supplying them to students at 50 paise (US$0.01) per page.

In 2012, Oxford University Press, Cambridge University Press (UK) and Taylor & Francis Group (UK), as well as Cambridge University Press India Pvt. Ltd. and Taylor & Francis Books India Pvt. Ltd., filed suit against Rameshwari Photocopy Service and the University of Delhi alleging copyright infringement. The Association of Students for Equitable Access to Knowledge (ASEAK) and Society for Promoting Educational Access and Knowledge (SPEAK) sought to be impleaded into the case as defendants, and this was granted.

== Case of the plaintiffs ==
The plaintiffs argued that in allowing Rameshwari Photocopy Services to reproduce pages from the plaintiffs' publications, and providing those publications to RPS from its library, Delhi School of Economics gave institutional sanction for copyright infringement.

They said that the course packs consisted entirely of photocopies of pages from their copyrighted publications, that these course packs were being used like textbooks, and therefore competing directly with the plaintiffs' publications.

The plaintiffs said that RPS was operating commercially, as it was selling the course packs at 40-50 paise per page, compared to the 20-25 paise per page market rate charged by other photocopiers where the material to be photocopied was supplied by the students themselves.

The plaintiffs anticipated that the defence would invoke Section 52(1)(i) of the Copyright Act, 1957, and argued that this section should not apply. They said that this section only covered reproduction of copyrighted material "in the course of instruction", noting that when the bill was tabled, Parliament had replaced the original wording "in the course of preparation for instructions"; and that the reproduction of the copyrighted material by RPS, assisted by the Delhi School of Economics, should not be considered such reproduction by a teacher or a pupil in the course of instruction. They argued that RPS's actions instead fell under Section 52(1)(h), under which they would be limited to reproducing two passages from works by the same author and publisher within any five-year period.

== Defence ==
Rameshwari Photocopy Services argued that its preparation of the course packs fell within the bounds of fair dealing under Sections 52(1)(a) and (h) of the Copyright Act, 1957. It said that its actions do not affect the market for the plaintiffs' publications, and that the students cannot afford to buy all of the books mentioned in the course syllabi of the Delhi School of Economics.

The University of Delhi argued that Section 52(1)(i) of the Copyright Act, 1957 allows students and educational institutions to reproduce parts from any work for research and educational purposes. It said that it had licensed RPS to operate within its premises to provide photocopying services to students for educational and research purposes; that under Section 52(1)(i), there is no limit to the amount of copyrighted material that may be reproduced. It argued that Section 52(1)(h) should not apply, "reproduction" as used in Section 52(1)(i) was distinct from the term "publication" used in Section 52(1)(h), with "publication" being defined in Section 3 of the Act as "making a work available to the public"; the University argued that public referred to a wider group of people than its student body. The University of Delhi also argued that the expression "course of instruction" should be broadly construed.

== Judgement ==
On 17 October 2012, the Delhi High Court passed an interim stay order to grant a temporary injunction against Rameshwari Photocopy Service, preventing them from selling compiled course packs to students.

On 16 September 2016, a single-judge bench headed by Justice Rajiv Sahai Endlaw dismissed the lawsuit and lifted the injunction, allowing RPS to resume selling the course packs.

On 9 December 2016, a two-judge division bench headed by Justice Pradeep Nandrajog set aside the earlier judgment and allowed the lawsuit to continue, but did not re-issue the temporary injunction. Instead, it asked RPS to maintain records of course packs it supplied, and to submit periodic statements to the court. The court ruled that expert evidence would be required to determine whether the inclusion of pages from copyrighted works into the course packs is justified.

=== Division bench findings of law ===
- Judgements Point No.31:"...unless the legislative intent expressly excludes fair use, and especially when a person’s result of labour is being utilized by somebody else, fair use must be read into the statute..."
- Judgements Point No.33 & 35: "..In the context of teaching and use of copyrighted material, the fairness in the use can be determined on the touchstone of ‘extent justified by the purpose’...."
- "...that the four factors on which fair use is determined in jurisdictions abroad would guide fair use of copyrighted material during course of instruction. The qualitative and quantitative test which is one of the four tests would not apply to clause (i).."
- Judgements Point No. 57 clarifies difference between 'reproduction' and 'publication' according to this ruling, "...Publication need not be for the benefit of or available to or meant for reading by all the members of the community. A targeted audience would also be a public as rightly urged by learned counsel for the appellants. But, a publication would have the element of profit, which would be missing in the case of reproduction of a work by a teacher to be used in the course of instruction while imparting education to the pupils. That apart, if reproduction includes the plural, it cannot be held that making of multiple copies would be impermissible. It happens in law that footprints of one concept fall in the territory of other but that does not mean that the former should be restricted.."

== Appeal and withdrawal ==
On 9 March 2017, newspapers including Hindustan Times reported that, the three publishers announced the withdrawal of the suit against Rameshwari Photocopy service shop and not to pursue photocopy shop case further in the courts. According to news report of The Hindu, the publishers had told the division Bench that they had decided to withdraw the suit against Rameshwari Photocopy shop as they did not want to engage in a legal battle with their stakeholders — the educational institutions. Despite the main plaintiffs withdrawing the case, the Indian Reprographic Rights Organisation (IRRO) petitioned the Supreme Court, challenging the judgment passed by the Division Bench of the Delhi High Court on 9 December 2016. Given that the original suit filed before the Delhi high court had been withdrawn by the publisher plaintiffs (OUP etc.) and the IRRO was merely an intervenor in the lower court proceedings, the Supreme Court decided not to interfere in the High Court order.

On 3 June 2017, the Financial Times also covered an extensive story on the case illustrating data from Nielsen that despite lack of public numbers, the publishers still made considerable profitable growth in India.

== See also ==
- Indian copyright law
- University of Delhi
- Delhi High Court
