= Yedidya Admon =

Israeli composer and singer

Yedidya Admon, also given as Yedidiah Admon, Yedidyah Admon Gorochov, or Yedidyah Admon-Gorokhov, (5 December 1894 – 2 April 1982) was an Israeli composer and singer. As a composer he was known for blending Western classical music with Middle Eastern music. Some of his best known works include the songs "Shir Hagamal" and "Shoshanat Yaakov".

== Life and career ==
Yedidya Admon was born on 5 December 1894 in Yekatrinoslav (now Dnipro, Ukraine). At the age of twelve, he relocated to the Land of Israel in 1906 in what was then Palestine. He was educated at the Beit Midrash for Teachers in Jerusalem where he was a pupil of Abraham Zvi Idelsohn. During World War I, Admon enlisted in the British Army and stationed in Egypt. After the war he returned to Palestine where he obtained employment as an accountant. While working he studied singing with Jehuda Har-Melaḥ; training as a countertenor.

In 1923 Admon left Palestine to continue his music studies in the United States studying at Johns Hopkins University in Baltimore where he graduated with a bachelor's degree in 1927 after four years of study. In Baltimore he studied composition and singing. While in America he was commissioned to write a vocal composition in the Arab-Bedouin style, and enlisted the help of Lazare Saminsky to complete this work. Admon himself was a gifted singer in the type of vocalizing. His first songs, "Ya leil" (‘Oh night’) and "Bein nhar prat" (‘Between the River Euphrates [and the R. Tigris]’) were written in the United States during the latter years of his education there.

After graduating from university, Admon returned to Palestine in 1927 where he began working as a composer. There he had his first works published, includin the song "Gamal Gemali" (1927, a.k.a. Camel Driver's Song). He moved to Paris in 1930 where he was pupil of Nadia Boulanger; studying with her at the École Normale de Musique de Paris from 1930-1939. During his time in Paris he developed and patented a method of dubbing English-language films in French.

Adom was chair and general secretary of the Society of Authors, Composers and Music Publishers in Israel from 1950 through 1967. He composed the oratorio Song of Deborah (1955). In 1963 his opera Moses and Pharaoh's Daughter was given its world premiere in New York City. In 1973 a book of his songs and choral works, Shedemati (English: My Field), was published. In 1974 he was awarded the Israel Prize. He also wrote the cantatas The Prophet, and Brit Hammayim (English: The Covenant with Water). He also wrote music to the stage works included Bar Kochba, Mikhal, Daughter of Saul, Jephtha’s Daughter, and Jeremiah (with dramatist Stefan Zweig).

Admon died in Tel-Aviv on 2 April 1982. In 1994 a street in Be'er Sheva was named after him.
