= SoundExchange =

Collective rights management organization

- Founded: September 22, 2003
- Type: Non-profit
- Tax ID no.: 760742496
- Location: Washington, D.C.
- Region served: International
- Services: Royalty distribution
- Key people: Michael Huppe (President and CEO)
- Website: soundexchange.com

SoundExchange is an American non-profit collective rights management organization spun off from the RIAA in 2003. It is the sole organization designated by the U.S. Congress to collect and distribute digital performance royalties for sound recordings.

== History ==
SoundExchange was created as a division of the RIAA in 2000. In 2001, major record labels and artists agreed on a standard for paying royalties earned from cable and satellite music services, and SoundExchange made its first payment, distributing $5.2 million in royalties to recording artists and labels. In 2002, four years after the Digital Millennium Copyright Act granted webcasters an automatic license to play copyrighted music provided that a royalty was paid, a lengthy arbitration process was concluded, and a royalty rate was set. SoundExchange was spun off from the RIAA and became an independent non-profit corporation in 2003.

SoundExchange's first executive director was John Simson, a musician, attorney, and artist manager. Simson left the organization in 2011 and was replaced by Michael Huppe. In 2018 it was announced that the organization had extended his contract through 2021. He also serves as the chairman of the board of SXWorks, a subsidiary created by SoundExchange following its acquisition of the Canadian Musical Reproduction Rights Association (CMRRA). SXWorks provides administration and back office services to publishers to support multiple licensing configurations.

In 2012, the company announced that it had paid over $1 billion in royalties since 2003. As of 2018, it had paid more than $5 billion, with recording artists and rights holders paid $884 million in 2016 alone.

In 2021, the company expanded royalty collections to include Private copying levy royalties, which was previously collected by the Alliance of Artists and Recording Companies (AARC) since 1993. AARC ceased operations at the end of 2021.

On October 18, 2024, SoundExchange partnered with the Societies' Council for the Collective Management of Performers' Rights (SCAPR) to issue international performer numbers (IPNs), becoming the first non-member neighboring rights collective to do so.

== Purpose ==
SoundExchange exists to administer statutory licenses for sound recording copyrights, primarily through the collection and distribution of royalties for sound recording performances occurring under the jurisdiction of federal law. An administrative fee is deducted from royalties before they are distributed, with the remainder divided between the performing artists on a given recording, and the copyright owner of that recording. As of 2023, the organization collects more than $1 billion annually for distribution.

SoundExchange handles the following duties with respect to statutory licenses:

- Collects performance royalties from the statutory licensees
- Collects and processes all data associated with the performance of the sound recordings
- Allocates royalties for the performance of the sound recording based on all of the data collected and processed;
- Distributes the featured artist's share directly to the artist
- Distributes the copyright owner's share directly to the copyright owner
- Distributes the non-featured artist's share to SAG-AFTRA and AFM's Intellectual Property Rights Distribution Fund
- Provides reports summarizing the titles, featured artists, and royalty amounts for each of the sound recordings performed by the statutory licensees

SoundExchange collects and distributes royalties for all artists and copyright owners covered under the statutory licenses. It has collection agreements with more than 40 international performance rights organizations around the world, allowing it to collect and pay royalties to recording artists and rights owners when their music is played in those countries. In 2017, SoundExchange expanded into music publisher administration with its acquisition of Canadian mechanical rights society Canadian Musical Reproduction Rights Agency (CMRRA).

== Authority and structure ==
SoundExchange is designated by the Librarian of Congress as the sole organization authorized to collect royalties paid by services making ephemeral phonorecords or digital audio transmissions of sound recordings, or both, under the statutory licenses set forth in 17 U.S.C. § 112 and 17 U.S.C. § 114. As of January 1, 2003, SoundExchange is designated by the United States Copyright Office to also distribute the collected royalties to copyright owners and performers entitled under and pursuant to 17 U.S.C. § 114(g)(2). Incorporated in the State of Delaware, SoundExchange is exempt from taxation under Section 501(c)(6) of the Internal Revenue Code. It operates, in part, pursuant to Copyright Office regulations set forth in 37 C.F.R. Parts 370, 380, 382, 383 and 384.

== Royalty rate setting ==
As required by the United States Code, SoundExchange, along with other interested parties, participates in each periodic rate-making proceedings to establish rates that compensate copyright owners and performers for the use of copyrighted sound recordings. Such rate setting proceedings may be resolved through proceedings through the Copyright Royalty Board (CRB).

A 2007 royalty rate increase was reported as establishing a rate that would "render Internet radio unsustainable, or at the very least, more ad-laden than terrestrial radio." Critics charged that in negotiating the royalty, SoundExchange was concerned primarily with major labels and their artists. Thousands of internet broadcasters participated in a "day of silence" protest by cancelling their programming on June 26, 2007.

In 2016, SoundExchange's rate proposal to the Copyright Royalty Board would more than double Sirius XM's royalty payments.

=== Satellite radio ===
In December 2017, the Copyright Royalty Board (CRB) increased the SiriusXM royalty rate from 11.5% of revenue to 15.5% of revenue through 2022. The CRB also rendered a decision on royalty rates paid by Muzak and Music Choice in December 2017, reducing the royalty rates paid by those services from 8.5% of revenue to 7.5% of revenue. The Music Modernization Act of 2018 subsequently extended the rates for an additional five years, through 2027.

In 2015 SoundExchange sued Muzak for underpayments of royalties to artists and rights holders. Because its royalty rate was established before the DMCA was enacted, Muzak's streaming services to Dish Network subscribers was allowed a grandfathered rate standard that resulted in lower royalty rates. The SoundExchange lawsuit sought to implement the standard royalty rate for new subscriptions on Muzak's streaming services to other cable/satellite TV providers.

=== Webcasting ===
The CRB judges established webcasting rates (per song, per listener) on December 16, 2015, for the 2016–2020 term – $0.0017 for non-subscription performances and $0.0020 for subscription performances for commercial webcasters in 2017, with rates for each subsequent year adjusted upward or downward, according to the Consumer Price Index for the year. As of 2018, webcasting rates were $0.0018 for non-subscription services and $0.0023 for subscription services.

== Projects and initiatives ==
In March 2016 SoundExchange introduced an online service to allow music services to locate metadata for 20 million sound recordings in its database. The service allows users to search SoundExchange's database of international standard recording rates, unique identifiers for sound recordings.

In January 2018 the SoundExchange subsidiary SXWorks launched NOI (Notice of Intention) Lookup. It allows songwriters and publishers to search a U.S. copyright database which indexes "Address Unknown" notices, the term used when a music service files an intention to use a musical work, but claims that they cannot locate the copyright owner. A free tool, it allows copyright owners to identify their work. In 2017, an average of 2.5 million monthly address unknown NOI filings were submitted to the US Copyright Office by music services.

== Criticism ==
In 2019, SoundExchange introduced the "Overlaps & Disputes" feature for rights holders utilizing their software. However, this feature triggered concerns among independent rights holders. Some artists, particularly those distributing their music through independent platforms, expressed frustration through blog posts and video-sharing platforms. Allegations of "Royalty Raiding" emerged, with claims that major labels, notably Warner Music Group, were disputing performance royalties of independent artists.

A dispute arises when a right holder submits a form to SoundExchange asserting that an existing claim on a composition's performance rights is invalid, and they are the legal right holder. The prevalence of such complaints has led to speculations of major labels, with their extensive repertoires and industry dominance, may mass-dispute rights holders' claims to redirect income from self-managed indie artists. Opinions on responsibility vary, with some attributing predatory behavior to major labels, while others argue that artists should exercise due diligence in managing their rights and finances within the music industry.

== See also ==
- Performance rights organization
