= Collective administration of copyrights =

Collection administration of copyrights describes the use in Canadian law of collective societies to manage licenses for copyrighted material belonging to more than one copyright owner. These collective societies are responsible for granting permission to use the works they manage and setting out what conditions users of their works must follow. Examples of collective societies in Canada include: Christian Video Licensing International (licensing audiovisual programs to religious institutions) and the Canadian Broadcasters Rights Agency (licensing of programming owned by Canadian television stations and networks.)

Reasons justifying the practice of collective administration of copyrights often pertain to debates over the economic efficiency of such policies. Collective administration of copyrights in Canada differs from collective administration policies in other common law jurisdictions such as the United States and United Kingdom. Consequently, the justifications for Canadian collective administration will not necessarily be identical to that of other systems.

== Legal Regime ==
The expression "collective society" was defined in Canada by the Bill C-32 amendment of the Copyright Act of Canada in 1997. Although Parliament was dissolved before Bill C-32 made it through its second reading, Bill C-11, which contains identical language, has since been reintroduced by Parliament:

"Collective society" means a society, association or corporation that carries on the business of collective administration of copyright or of the remuneration right conferred by section 19 or 81 for the benefit of those who, by assignment, grant of licence, appointment of it as their agent or otherwise, authorize it to act on their behalf in relation to that collective administration, and (a) operates a licensing scheme, applicable in relation to a repertoire of works, performer’s performances, sound recordings or communication signals of more than one author, performer, sound recording maker or broadcaster, pursuant to which the society, association or corporation sets out classes of uses that it agrees to authorize under this Act, and the royalties and terms and conditions on which it agrees to authorize those classes of uses, or (b) carries on the business of collecting and distributing royalties or levies payable pursuant to this Act

This definition divides collective societies into four legal regimes: music and performing rights, general collective administration, particular cases (retransmissions and certain educational uses), and private copying levies.

=== Music Performing Rights ===
The performance or telecommunication of musical works and sound recordings of musical works is regulated in s.67 of the Copyright Act. Although authors may theoretically protect their copyrighted works without participating in a collective, in practice the Society of Composers, Authors and Music Publishers of Canada (SOCAN) holds virtually all musical works performed in Canada within its repertoire.

=== General Regime ===
Voluntary licensing schemes that do not fall under s.67 fall instead within s.70.1 barring the existence of another applicable regulatory scheme. Nonetheless, collective management organizations under s.67 collect and distribute more funds than those under s.70.1. In practice, the following types of copyrights are covered by the general regime:

- reprography is regulated by Access Copyright or COPIBEC
- mechanical rights
- visual arts
- sound recordings and music videos
- audiovisual and multimedia rights
- off-air program taping
- other areas

=== Retransmissions and Use by Educational Institutions ===
Sections 71-76 of the Copyright Act create a regime regulating involuntary licences for the retransmission of distant radio and televisions signals and the reproduction and public performance by education institutions of radio and television programs for educational or training purposes. Eight retransmission copyright management organizations are covered at least in part by this regime:

- Border Broadcasters' Inc.
- Canadian Broadcasters Rights Agency
- Canadian Retransmission Collective
- Canadian Retransmission Right Association
- Copyright Collective of Canada
- FWS Join Sports Claimants
- Major League Baseball Collective of Canada
- Society of Composers, Authors and Music Publishers of Canada

=== Private Copying ===
Private copying of sound recordings is dealt with by a regime established in 1998 specifically for that purpose. This regime makes an exception to copyright infringement for copies of music for private use. The regime does not involve licensing. Instead it remunerates copyright holders by collecting funds through the Canadian Private Copying Collective and sets out a share of these funds which all eligible authors, performers, and makers or record producers are entitled.

== The Copyright Board ==
The Copyright Board of Canada is an independent administrative tribunal consisting of at most five members appointed to five year terms by the government. A small permanent staff is provided to the Board which includes a Secretary General, General Counsel and Director of Research and Analysis. Unique among Canadian regulatory agencies, the Chairman of the Board tends to be drawn from sitting or retired judges of a superior court. The reasons for this are entirely historical.

=== Procedures ===
Proposed tariffs must be filed before March 31 of the year before the year in which the tariff will come into effect. Proposed tariffs are published by the Board in the Canada Gazette. Objections by users to this proposal must be filed within 60 days following the Gazette's publication. These objections may then be decided before a panel with the procedures and timetable issued by the Board. Although the rules of evidence are not binding for the Board, the Board does provide written reasons for its decision.

== Criticisms of Collective Administration ==
=== Delays and Inefficiencies ===
The Copyright Board's ability to handle the volume of complaints that arise from collective administration of copyright has often been characterized as slow and expensive. Legal scholars have argued that a number of structural elements of the Canadian system contribute to these inefficiencies including mandatory filing of tariffs by collective management organizations and the Board's inability to award costs.

=== Formation of Unnecessary Monopolies ===
It can be argued that collective administration of copyright creates monopolies that lead to economic inefficiencies. Collective management organizations, for example, are only capable of categorizing different copyrighted works into broad categories due to the limitations of regulatory specificity. Consequently, some copyrighted works will be licensed according to the average value of the works in the same category and not the value of the specific work. The failure to provide a license based on the value of the specific work in question means that payments to copy copyrighted works do not reflect the actual value of the copying.

Legal scholars such as Ariel Katz have argued that these inefficiencies may be unnecessary as there exist reasonable alternatives to collective administration of copyright, especially with the immergence of new technology that might facilitate alternative systems of managing copyright licensing. The idea that effective administration of copyright licenses necessitates single entity monopolies may be argued against, for example, by considering copyright regimes in which licensing is regulated by multiple collective management organizations without any apparent ill-effect. In addition Katz cites the "superstar phenomenon" which recognizes that the vast majority of copyright royalties are payments for works belonging to a disproportionately small number of individuals. Given that license sales are actually not widely dispersed among copyright owners, Katz argues that there is no reason to suppose that direct transactions between licensees and copyright holders would be impractical.
