= Menachem Avidom =

Israeli composer of Polish descent (1908–1995)

- מנחם אבידום
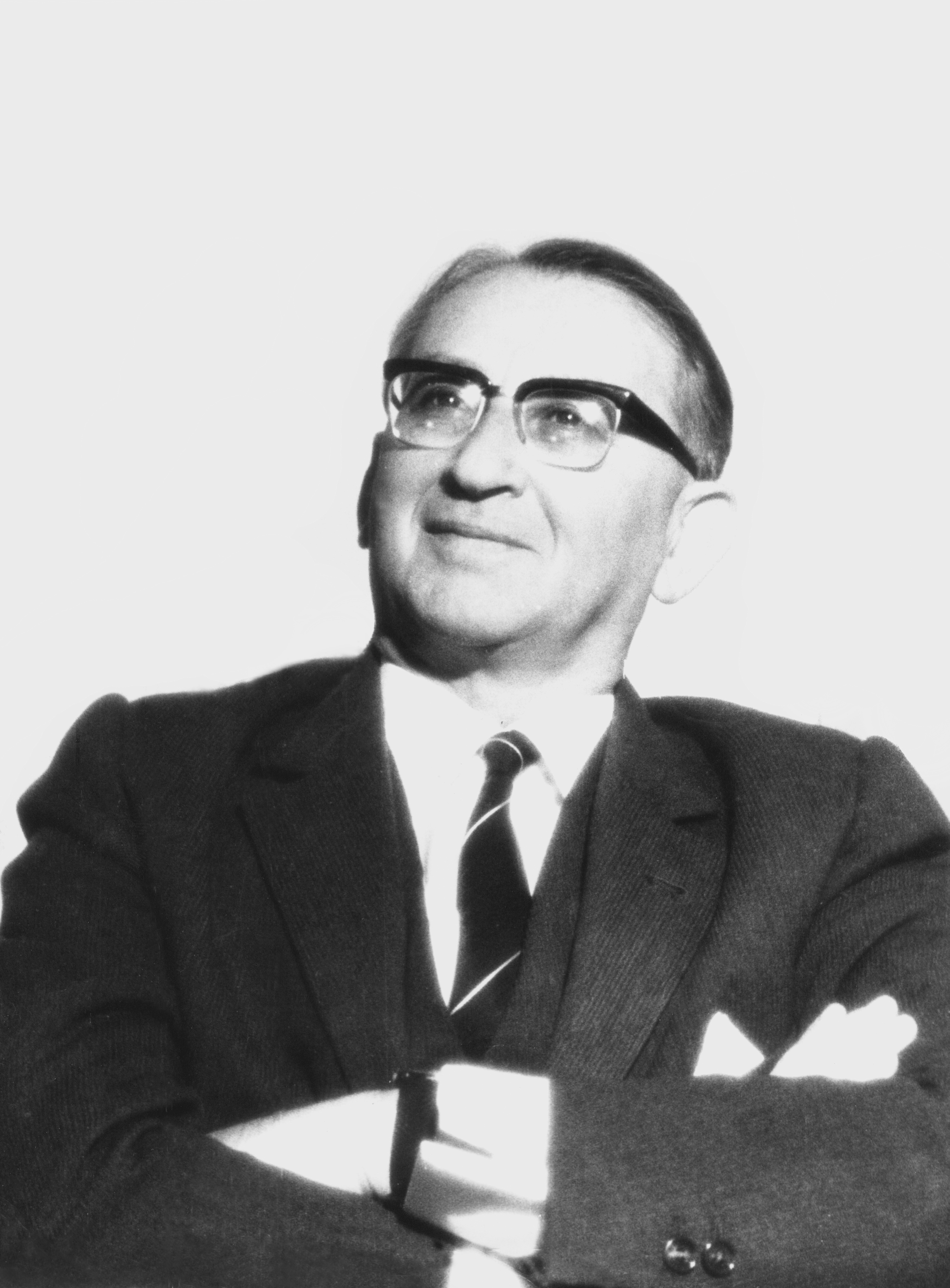
- Menachem Avidom
- Born: Mendel Mahler-Kalkstein; January 6, 1908; Stanisławów, Austria-Hungary
- Died: August 5, 1995 (aged 87); Tel Aviv, Israel
- Education: American University of Beirut, Paris Conservatory
- Occupation: Composer
- Known for: Israeli composer; General Secretary of the Israeli Philharmonic; Director of ACUM; Chair of the Israel Composer's League
- Awards: Israel Prize (1961)

Menachem Avidom (Hebrew: מנחם אבידום; January 6, 1908 – August 5, 1995) was an Israeli composer. His Hebrew surname is the combination of the names of his daughters Daniella and Miriam (Avi - the father of; D - for Daniella; O - and; M - for Miriam).

== Biography ==
Avidom was born Mendel Mahler-Kalkstein in Stanislaviv, Austria-Hungary on January 6, 1908. This put him in Poland after World War I. He emigrated to Mandatory Palestine in 1925 and, soon after, went to study at the American University of Beirut (from 1926 to 1928). After further studies at the Paris Conservatory (from 1928 to 1931) with Henri Rabaud, he moved to Tel Aviv, where he taught music theory. From 1945 through 1952 he served as general secretary of the Israeli Philharmonic. In 1955 he was named director of the Society of Authors, Composers and Music Publishers in Israel (ACUM); a post he remained in for twenty five years. He was also chair of the Israel Composer's League from 1958 through 1971.

He died in Tel Aviv, Israel, on August 5, 1995.

== Awards ==
- In 1961, Avidom was awarded the Israel Prize for music, in recognition of his opera Alexandra ha'Hashmonait.

== Works ==
Vocal

- In Every Generation, opera, 1955
- Alexandra ha'Hashmonait, opera, 1961
- The Farewell, opera, 1971
- The First Sin, opera, 1980
- Me'Arat Yodfat, opera
- 4 other operas
- Kantatat t'hilim, cantata, 1955
- 12 Hills, cantata, 1976

Orchestral

- Symphony No. 3: Yam tichonit, 1952
- 9 other symphonies
- Flute Concerto
- Concertino for violin and orchestra

Chamber music

- Suite on B-A-C-H, chamber ensemble, 1964
- Brass Quintet, 1969
- Sonata for unaccompanied viola, 1984

== See also ==
- List of Israel Prize recipients
