= Motion Picture Licensing Corporation =

Independent copyright licensing agency

MPLC
- Type: Private
- Industry: Legal
- Founded: 1986
- Headquarters: Los Angeles, California
- Key people: Rory Shedden (Chief Executive Officer)
- Products: Umbrella License
- Website: www.mplc.org

Motion Picture Licensing Corporation ("MPLC") is a global, independent, non-theatrical copyright licensing company authorized by more than 4,000 motion picture and television copyright holders, such as studios and producers, to issue a public performance license, called the “Umbrella License” which allows the public performance of copyrighted motion pictures, television programs and other audiovisual works that were originally intended for personal use only. The federal Copyright Act provides copyright owners the exclusive right to control the performance of their works. The Umbrella License allows organizations, corporations, associations, and other groups and institutions to show legally obtained motion pictures, television programs, and other audiovisual content that are originally intended for personal, private, home use only, in locations outside of the home. MPLC rights holders include Hollywood studios as well as children's, faith-based, independent, television, special interest, and international producers.

Founded in 1986, MPLC is a privately owned and operated company with offices in over 40 countries. MPLC's United States office is located in Los Angeles, California. MPLC’s parent company, Motion Picture Licensing Company (International) Limited is located in the United Kingdom.

== Studios represented ==
MPLC provides audiovisual public performance licenses to numerous non-theatrical businesses, organizations, and other institutions. The following non-exhaustive list of studios varies based on industry and country.

- A&E Television Network
- BBC Worldwide
- Big Idea Entertainment
- Bleecker Street
- Brainstorm Media
- C3 Entertainment
- Cinedigm
- Discovery, Inc.
- Dreamscape
- Entertainment One
- Fintage House
- Hurricane Films
- Lionsgate Films
- MGM
- Momentum Pictures
- MVM Entertainment
- NBCUniversal
- Paramount Pictures
- Revelation Films
- RLJE Films
- Scholastic Corporation
- Screen Media Films
- Sony Pictures
- Spark Media
- STX Entertainment
- Turner Broadcasting System
- 20th Century Studios
- UIP
- ViacomCBS
- Walt Disney Pictures
- Warner Bros. Entertainment Inc.
- Xenon Pictures

== Public performance licensing in the USA ==
Section 101 of the United States Copyright Act provides copyright protection for “original works of authorship fixed in any tangible medium of expression.” As defined under Section 102, “works of authorship” includes motion pictures (otherwise referred to as “movies” or “films” in the United States) and other audiovisual works. “Audiovisual works” are further defined as works that consist of a series of related images “which are intrinsically intended to be shown by the use of machines or devices.” Under Section 106, only the copyright owner holds the exclusive right, among several other exclusive rights “to perform the copyrighted work publicly.” For any copyrightable subject matter, to “perform” means “to recite, render, play, dance or act it”, which can be either directly or by means of any device or process, including “any kind of equipment for reproducing or amplifying sounds or visual images, any sort of transmitting apparatus, any type of electronic retrieval system, and any other techniques and systems not yet in use or even invented.” Section 106 also grants the owner of copyright the exclusive right to authorize any of the other rights under that section. As part of the definition of “transfer of copyright ownership” under Section 101, the copyright owner (or rights holder) may transfer its exclusive rights in the form of an exclusive license.

Motion pictures and other audiovisual works may be shown without a separate license in the home to “a normal circle of a family and its social acquaintances” because such showings are not considered “public.” Without a license or other authorization from a rights holder, a person does not have any of the rights in a copyright exclusively reserved to the rights holder including that right to perform in public.

== Non-theatrical markets ==
In the United States and globally, MPLC provides a blanket public performance license. Blanket public performance licenses permit licensees to publicly perform, to the maximum extent permitted by applicable copyright laws, licensed motion pictures, television and other audiovisual works that are originally intended for private use and accessed from any legal source, where there is no advertising regarding the exhibition in any media directed to the general public, and for which no fee or admission is charged. MPLC provides its blanket license, the Umbrella License (license name differs by country), to the following non-exhaustive list of industries:

- Child care/nurseries
- Clubs and leisure centers
- Commercial and retail establishments
- Communal living facilities
- Corporations
- Education
- Government and similar buildings
- Health care buildings and services
- Religious institutions
- Restaurants, clubs, and pubs
- Short-term lodging
- Transportation

MPLC also provides title-by-title or digital public performance licenses outside of the United States. Title-by-title licenses permit licensees to publicly perform, to the maximum extent permitted by applicable copyright laws, specifically identified motion pictures, television and other audiovisual works that are originally intended for private use and accessed from any legal source, for exhibitions which may advertise to the general public and/or where admission is charged. Digital licensing means the business of copying, distributing, and providing public performance rights of digital materials supplied from rights holders to an approved electronic platform which serves as a source for public performance exhibitions.

== History ==
MPLC was founded in 1986 shortly after the videocassette made it possible for consumers to watch movies at home. Its business was created to uphold the U.S. Copyright Act by protecting intellectual property holders from piracy and infringement. MPLC states that its objective and approach is one of intellectual property education, supporting all the various anti-piracy activities undertaken by the studios and the Motion Picture Association (MPA). MPLC not only issues licenses to those showing content publicly who have often been showing movies illegally before, but insists that only legally obtained content be performed. MPLC works closely with governments and intellectual property offices worldwide to ensure copyright compliance, and that the entertainment industry continues to receive royalties from public exhibition. MPLC also has relationships with industry associations and strategic partners around the world to encourage copyright compliance among businesses, government, and other organizations.

In December 2019, Tenzing, an independent private equity investor, acquired a majority stake in MPLC.

== See also ==
- List of Copyright Collection Societies
- Christian Copyright Licensing International (CCLI)
- Copyright Clearance Center (CCC)
- Swank Motion Pictures
- Filmbank Media
- Entidad de Gestión de Derechos de los Productores Audiovisuales (EGEDA)
- ASCAP
- Broadcast Music, Inc.
- SESAC
- Federation Against Copyright Theft
- Chartered Trading Standards Institute
- The Industry Trust for Intellectual Property Awareness
