= Performance rights organisation =

Copyright collective for music royalties

A performance rights organisation (PRO), also known as a performing rights society, provides intermediary functions, particularly collection of royalties, between copyright holders and parties who wish to use copyrighted works publicly in locations such as shopping and dining venues. Legal consumer purchase of works, such as buying CDs from a music store, confer private performance rights. PROs usually only collect royalties when use of a work is incidental to an organisation's purpose. Royalties for works essential to an organisation's purpose, such as theaters and radio, are usually negotiated directly with the rights holder. The interest of the organisations varies: many have the sole focus of musical works, while others may also encompass works and authors for audiovisual, drama, literature, or the visual arts.

In some countries PROs are called copyright collectives or copyright collecting agencies. A copyright collective is more general than a PRO as it is not limited to performances and includes reproduction rights organisations (RROs). RROs represent works distributed via mediums such as CD, audiocassette, or computer file rather than use of works in public settings.

The global governing body for PROs is CISAC headquartered in France, with 228 member societies in 119 countries.

== History ==
The first performing rights society was established in France in 1851. In the United Kingdom, the Copyright Act 1842 was the first to protect musical compositions with the Performing Right Society, founded in 1914 encompassing live performances. The rights for recorded or broadcast performance are administered by the Mechanical Copyright Protection Society, founded in 1924. Italy introduced a performing rights society in 1882 and Germany in 1915. In the United States, The American Society of Composers, Authors and Publishers (ASCAP) was founded in 1914; Society of European Stage Authors & Composers (SESAC) in 1930 and Broadcast Music, Inc. (BMI) in 1939. Sociedad Puertorriqueña de Autores y Compositores de Musica (SPACEM) was founded in San Juan, Puerto Rico in 1953. SPACEM's name was changed to ACEMLA, or Asociacion de Compositoes y Editores de Musica and remains today PRO No. 76 in the CISAC's roster of performing rights societies.

== Activities ==
Other than their primary purpose as an intermediary between rights holders and customers, PROs are highly active in legal arenas. PROs take alleged rights violators to court, or in the U.S., to the Copyright Royalty Board, of the Library of Congress. PROs lobby on behalf of rights holders, especially in discussions of legal royalty rates.

As a side benefit of tracking public performance of works for royalty collection, PROs publish statistics of publicly performed works.

The licensing services provided by a PRO arguably provide advantage to customers, who can simultaneously license all works the PRO represents.

== Criticisms ==
PROs have been criticised for charging non-profit organisations for their use of copyrighted music in situations where the non-profit organisation was not earning money from the use. ASCAP, for example, was eventually forced in the face of public opinion to abandon its attempts to charge the Girl Scouts of the USA for singing campfire songs. ASCAP's and SESAC's policy of charging non-commercial educational (NCE) radio stations for playing copyrighted music has also been criticised, especially by college radio stations across the U.S., which rely entirely on student and listener support for funding and have difficulty affording the extra fees. Community Orchestras, which mostly play classical works in the public domain, may occasionally play a work within copyright, but are forced to pay licenses to rights societies on all concert revenues including concerts where all music is in the public domain, which is then distributed to songwriters of pop songs.

PROs are often criticised for stretching the definition of "public performance." Until relatively recently in the U.S., playing copyrighted music in restaurants did not involve legal issues if the media was legally purchased. PROs now demand royalties for such use.

"One exception to the rule allows businesses of a certain size (stores under 2,000 square feet, restaurants or bars under 3,750 square feet) to play music from a radio, television, or similar household device without a license, provided there are fewer than six speakers (with limits on the placement of speakers), and customers aren't charged to listen. Other exceptions include educational and charitable functions... If your business falls into one of the categories listed above (size of business, number and placement of speakers, etc.) radio/TV] you may want to check out section 110(5) of the Copyright Act. As you likely won't need a license. But, before making a decision, check with a lawyer."

By discouraging performances in limited public arenas, again using the restaurant example, critics say PROs eliminate the free publicity such performances provide for a work thereby depressing media sales. Incidentally, lower media sales conflict with PROs, but disputes between the two parties are not known to occur since each type of organisation represents the interests of the same parties - rights owners - and are forced to work in common interest.

Rights owners – especially independents and newcomers not represented by large publishing companies – criticise the PROs for what they deem to be "mystical" formulas for deciding who gets what share of the total licensing revenue received. They also criticise PROs for slow or non-existent payments and excessive membership dues or service fees.

== Organisations ==
=== North America ===
==== United States ====
- AllTrack
- ASCAP
- BMI
- Global Music Rights
- SESAC

==== Canada ====
- SOCAN
- Re:Sound Music Licensing Company
- CMRRA

==== Others ====
Most countries (that observe copyright) have the equivalent:

Country	Agencies
Argentina	SADAIC
Australia	Australasian Performing Right Association (APRA)
Australia	Phonographic Performance Company of Australia (PPCA)
Austria	Autoren, Komponisten und Musikverleger (AKM)
Belgium	SABAM
Bolivia	Servicio Nacional de Propiedad Intellectual (SENAPI)
Brazil	ECAD (Escritório Central de Arrecadação e Distribuição)
Bulgaria	MUSICAUTHOR
Chile	Sociedad Chilena del Derecho de Autor (SCD)
China	Music Copyright Society of China(MCSC)
Colombia	SAYCO/ACINPRO
Croatia	HDS
Czech Republic	OSA
Denmark	KODA
Estonia	EAU
Finland	Teosto
France	Société des auteurs, compositeurs et éditeurs de musique (SACEM)
Georgia	SAS
Germany	Gesellschaft für musikalische Aufführungs- und mechanische Vervielfältigungsrechte (GEMA)
Greece	AEPI
Greece	GEA-GRAMMO, ERATO-APOLLON
Hong Kong	CASH
Hungary	ARTISJUS
India	The Indian Performing Right Society Ltd
Ireland	Irish Music Rights Organisation, Phonographic Performance Ireland (PPI)
Israel	ACUM
Italy	SIAE
Japan	JASRAC
Lithuania	LATGA-A
Malaysia	MACP
Mexico	SACM
Nepal	Music Royalty Collection Society Nepal (MRCSN)
Netherlands	BUMA
New Zealand	APRA
Norway	TONO
Panama	SPAC
Peru	APDAYC
Philippines	FILSCAP
Poland	ZAIKS
Puerto Rico	ACEMLA
Romania	UCMR
Russia	RAO
Serbia	SOKOJ
Singapore	Composers and Authors Society of Singapore Ltd (COMPASS)
Slovakia	SOZA
South Africa	Southern African Music Rights Organisation (SAMRO)
South Korea	KOMCA, KOSCAP
Spain	SGAE
Sweden	STIM
Switzerland	SUISA
Taiwan	MUST
Thailand	MCT
Trinidad and Tobago	COTT
Ukraine	UACRR
United Kingdom	PRS, PPL
Uruguay	AGADU
Venezuela	SACVEN

== State regulation and income taxes ==
Although the Copyright Clause of the United States Constitution delegates the power to establish Copyright law in the United States, in recent years, a number of States have enacted transparency laws in respect to Performing Rights Societies. These generally force Performing Rights Societies to discloses the musical works they license. Because many establishments pay blanket license fees to Performing Rights Societies but have little or no idea if the fees they pay actually secure the rights to perform musical works. This can result in unfair business practices called tolling. Many performing rights societies send representatives into businesses who attempt to disrupt or shut down a concert, claiming an insufficient or performing right license, and some states have banned this practice.

Moreover, states with income taxes hope to withhold royalty income for "performances" inside those states rather than in the state where a composer/songwriter lives or the Performing Rights Society is located. In practice, state income tax accounting is very difficult to regulate. Notable is Colorado's law, which requires each Performing Rights Society to disclose its entire catalog.
