= Indian Reprographic Rights Organisation =

- Abbreviation: IRRO
- Formation: 2000
- Type: Society
- Purpose: The rights of Authors and Publishers of literary works
- Headquarters: New Delhi, India
- Location: 18/1-C, Aruna Asaf Ali Marg, Institutional Area, New Delhi, India
- Website: https://www.irro.org.in/

Indian Reprographic Rights Organisation (IRRO) is a copyright society established under Section 33 of the Copyright Act, 1957. Its main objective is to ensure that the copyrights of authors are protected and that copyright owners are respected and rewarded when their original works are used and reproduced. The guidelines of regulating copyrights by IRRO are curated in a fair way that rewards the authors, creators, and publishers and allows easy reproduction of their works and publications. The organization deploys the highest ethical standards when it comes to dealing with the rights of authors, collecting and distributing remunerations, and the bonafide funds they hold.

IRRO represents the rights of publishers in the Indian copyright ecosystem. The organization has strong global affiliations with the International Federation of Reproduction Rights Organisations (IFRRO) and other international RROs. Being a member of IFRRO, the organization operates in accordance with internationally accepted standards of supervising reproduction rights of copyright.

== History ==
Indian Reprographic Rights Organisation (IRRO) is a copyright society incorporated in 2000 and authorized by the Ministry of Human Resource Development, Government of India. It stands for the rights of authors and publishers and regulates the use and reproduction of their literary works. Over the years, IRRO has become a privileged partner of the International Federation of Reproduction Rights Organisation (IFRRO) and made strong connections with other countries’ RROs.

IRRO issues licenses of copyrighted materials for reproduction by photocopying, scanning, etc. on behalf of rights holders. The materials may include magazines, books, and journals supplied by a licensed third party. The licenses eliminate the risk associated with the reproduction of such materials. For the most part, IRRO works on providing reprographic access to users like institutes, photocopy shops, and universities, and providing equitable remuneration to rights holders.

IRRO’s policies and awareness propaganda have increased the respect for copyrights among governments, users and right holders throughout India.

== Cases ==
Rameshwari Photocopy Service shop copyright case On March 9, 2017, newspapers including Hindustan Times reported that the three publishers announced to withdraw the suit against Rameshwari Photocopy service shop and not to pursue the photocopy shop case further in the courts. According to a news report of The Hindu, the publishers had told the division Bench that they had decided to withdraw the suit against Rameshwari Photocopy shop as they did not want to engage in a legal battle with their stakeholders — the educational institutions. Despite the main plaintiff withdrawing the case, Indian Reprographic Rights Organisation (IRRO) made an attempt to move a petition in Supreme Court of India challenging the judgment passed by the Division Bench of the Delhi High Court on December 9, 2016. Given that the original suit filed before the Delhi High Court had been withdrawn by the publisher plaintiffs (OUP etc.) and the IRRO was merely an intervenor in the lower court proceedings, Supreme Court decided not to interfere in the High Court order.

On June 3, 2017, The Financial Times also covered an extensive story on the case illustrating data from Nielsen that despite lack of public numbers, the publishers still made considerable profitable growth in India.

== About Copyright ==
Copyright is a type of intellectual property that allows the creator to own their original work in a way as something physical is owned. It refers to the right of the owner to prevent others from copying, reusing or reproducing their work. In simpler terms, copyright is a legal means of protecting a creator’s (author, musician, filmmaker, etc.) work.

Creators spend a lot of time in producing original work. They initially produce it for free, but as their artwork is used or sold, they’re bound to receive a payment. However, such a payment is only compensated if the creator has registered for copyrights. If a creator fails to copyright its work, anyone can copy it and/or falsely claim to own it. To avoid this from happening, various copyright societies like IRRO were formed to help writers, musicians and other artists copyright their creative work. The legislation responsible for regulating copyright in India is the Copyright Act 1957 (as amended by the Copyright Amendment Act 2012) and the Copyright Rules, 2013.
