= Société de la Propriété Artistique des Dessins et Modèles =

Société de la Propriété Artistique et des Dessins et Modèles (English: Society for Artistic Property and Designs and Models), often S.P.A.D.E.M. or SPADEM, was a copyright protection and collection society formed by visual artists and their heirs in France. It is one of several such organizations in France which specialize according to specific kinds of art. Its purpose is similar to that of ASCAP and other organizations which defend the legal rights of artists.
