= Sociedad Argentina de Autores y Compositores de Música =

Performance rights organisation of Argentina

Sociedad Argentina de Autores y Compositores de Música (SADAIC; Argentine Society of Music Authors and Composers) is the entity that gathers all musicians and authors of Argentina, and the Argentine performance rights organisation that keeps registry of musical works, and collects and distributes royalties on behalf of the artists.

On 1 August 1930, in Buenos Aires, capital of the Republic of Argentina, Ciriaco Ortiz, César Vedani, Osvaldo Fresedo, Francisco Canaro, Juan Francisco Noli, Homero Manzi, Enrique Santos Discépolo, José Pécora, Francisco García Jiménez, José María Contursi and Mario Benard, after a long discussion, decided to form the Circle of Authors and Composers of Music with the sole purpose to help protect the intellectual property rights of authors and facilitate the collection of their royalties. The Circle of Authors and Composers of Music and the Argentine Association of Authors and Composers of Music would merge subsequently, giving rise to the birth of SADAIC (Argentine Society of Authors and Composers of Music), signing said act on 9 June 1936.

Canaro, being the President of SADAIC, learned of a judicial auction of a piece of land on 1545 Lavalle Street. Founded on 9 June 1936, it also organizes cultural events, musical courses and the health insurance for musicians. SADAIC is a BIEM and CISAC member.

== See also ==
- List of CISAC members
- Argentine Chamber of Phonograms and Videograms Producers
