= Buma/Stemra =

Dutch copyright collective

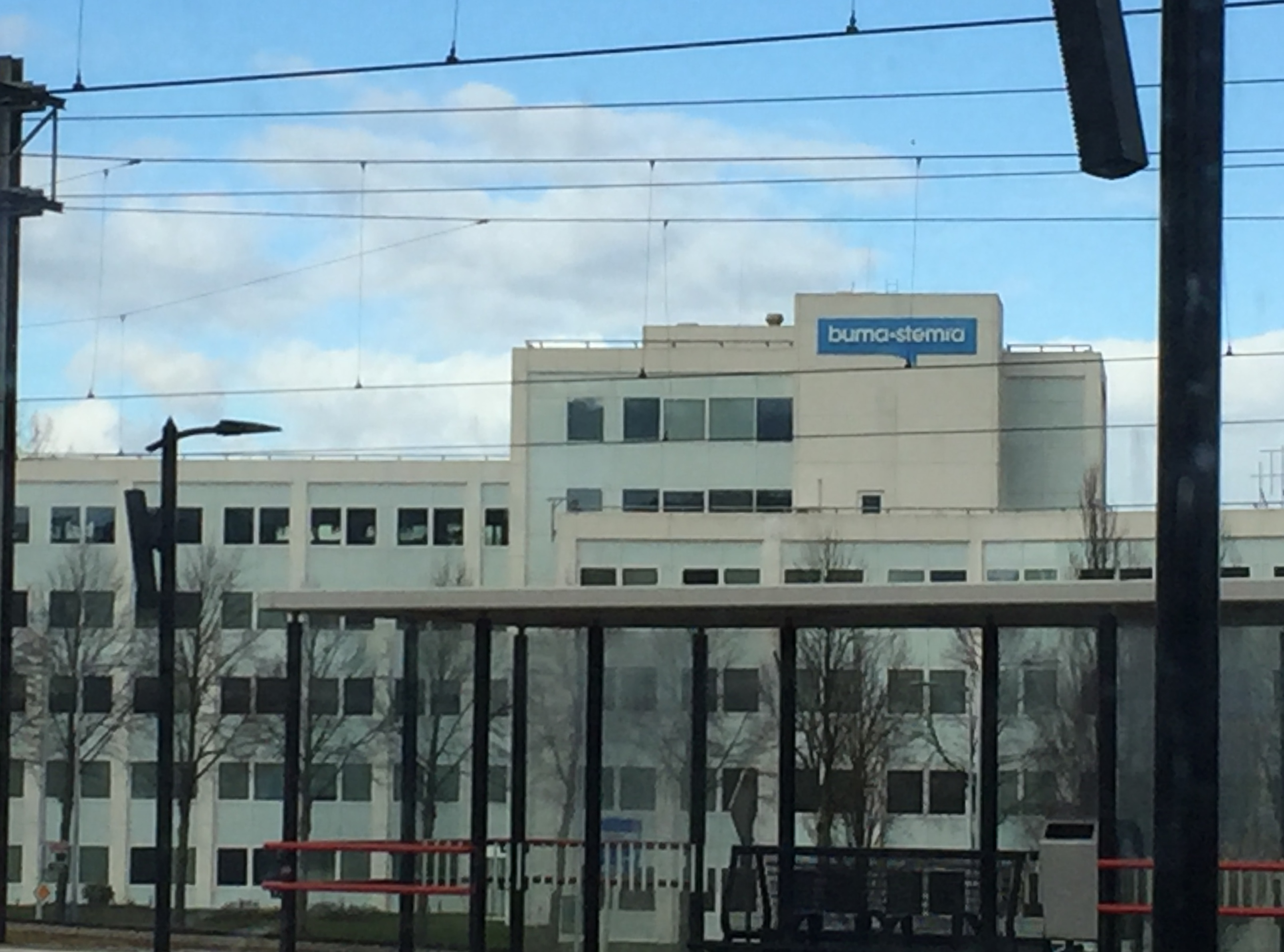
BUMA/STEMRA office in Hoofddorp, North Holland

BUMA/STEMRA are two private organisations in the Netherlands, the Buma Association (Dutch: Vereniging Buma) and the Stemra Foundation (Dutch: Stichting Stemra) that operate as one single company that acts as the Dutch collecting society for composers and music publishers.

== History ==
The Buma Association was set up by Dutch music authors and publishers in 1913, one year after the Dutch Copyright Act was passed. In 1936, with the arrival of the gramophone record, the replication of music multiplied. Realising its impact, the members of the Buma Association created the Stemra Foundation, which focuses on the replication of recorded works of music, ranging from LPs to CDs to Internet and mobile phones.

In 2001, Buma/Stemra sued Consumer Empowerment, then the owners of Kazaa in the Netherlands. The court ordered Kazaa's owners to take steps to prevent its users from violating copyrights or else pay a heavy fine. In October 2001 a lawsuit was filed against Consumer Empowerment by members of the music and motion picture industry in the United States. In response Consumer Empowerment sold the Kazaa application to Sharman Networks, which is headquartered in Australia and incorporated in Vanuatu. In late March 2002, a Dutch court of appeals reversed an earlier judgment and stated that Kazaa was not responsible for the actions of its users. Buma/Stemra lost its appeal before the Supreme Court of the Netherlands in December 2003.
