= Re:Sound Music Licensing Company =

Canadian non-profit performance rights organization

Re:Sound is the non-profit performance rights organization in Canada that collects and administers Neighbouring Rights royalties on behalf of recording artists, including featured artists and session musicians and record labels in Canada. Re:Sound was founded in 1997 and in French is referred to as Ré:Sonne.

Re:Sound licenses recorded music to businesses across many industries, including radio stations, satellite radio, digital music services, nightclubs, bars, restaurants, retail establishments and others. The royalties that are collected from licence fees are distributed to the recording artists and record labels that create the music that is used by these businesses.

== Collecting tariffs ==
Following Canada's Copyright Act, Re:Sound files tariffs before the Copyright Board of Canada on behalf or recording artists and record labels, contacts and grants licences to all Canadian commercial radio broadcasters, businesses using recorded music and background music suppliers. Re:Sound also works with similar organisations around the world to collect royalties for Canadian music creators when their intellectual property is used in other jurisdictions.

Once a tariff is certified by the Copyright Board and the tariff rates and regulations have been established by the Board. Re:Sound can begin to make contact with businesses across Canada to notify them of their possible obligations under a new tariff.

Re:Sound licences are "blanket" licences, which mean that businesses can use as much music as they wish. This eliminates the need for a business to clear large numbers of recordings with individual rights holders.

Re:Sound currently licenses businesses under tariffs for Commercial Radio, CBC Radio, Pay Audio, Background Music (restaurants, bars, retail establishments, etc.), Satellite Radio, Live Events (conference centres, hotels, karaoke bars, etc.), Dance (nightclubs, adult entertainment establishments, etc.), Fitness Activities (gyms, fitness clubs, classes, etc.)

== Distributing royalties ==
Re:Sound keeps track of millions of pieces of data from Canadian commercial radio stations, satellite radio, pay audio, CBC and others. After processing and summarizing, the data is used in the distribution of royalties to the artists. Royalties collected are distributed equally between artists and record companies less only actual costs (under 15%).

Member Organizations

Re:Sound has 3 performer and 2 maker member organizations:

Performer Organizations

- ACTRA RACS
- Musicians Rights Organization of Canada (MROC)
- Artisti

Maker Organizations

- Audio-Visual Licensing Agency AVLA
- SOPROQ
