= Canadian Musical Reproduction Rights Agency =

Canadian music licensing agency

Canadian Musical Reproduction Rights Agency Ltd.
- Logo
- Company type: Limited
- Industry: music licensing
- Founded: 1975; Canada
- Headquarters: Toronto, Ontario, Canada
- Website: Official web site

The Canadian Musical Reproduction Rights Agency Ltd. (CMRRA) is a music licensing agency based in Toronto, Ontario, Canada. Founded in 1975, CMRRA is a music licensing collective representing music rights-holders who range in size from large multinational music publishers to individual songwriters. On their behalf, CMRRA issues licences to individuals or organizations for the reproduction of songs on various media.

Licensees pay royalties to CMRRA which, in turn, CMRRA distributes to its publisher clients. The royalty rates are determined pursuant to negotiated agreements or tariffs certified by the Copyright Board of Canada. Online licensing and the broadcast mechanical are carried on through CMRRA's joint venture with Montreal-based SODRAC, CMRRA-SODRAC Inc. (CSI) Representation by CMRRA is open to any person, firm or corporation which owns or administers one or more musical works with respect to Canada.

CMRRA is governed by a board of directors elected every two years by the members of the Canadian Music Publishers Association (CMPA).
