= Collective rights management =

Copyright licensing

Collective rights management licenses copyright. Collective management organisations (CMOs), sometimes also referred to as collecting societies, typically represent groups, i.e.; authors (such as writers, composers, painters and photographers), performers (such as musicians, actors and dancers), publishers, phonogram producers, film producers and other rights holders. At the least, rights holders authorize collective rights management organizations to monitor the use of their works, negotiate licenses with prospective users, document correct right management data and information, collect remuneration for use of copyrighted works, ensuring a fair distribution of such remuneration amongst rightsholders. CMOs also act on legal mandates. Governmental supervision varies across jurisdictions.

== History ==
Collective rights management through a CMO first occurred during 1777, attributed to the efforts of Pierre Beaumarchais. In the early 2020s, CMOs function in approximately 130 countries around the world. The term collective management organization (CMO) has been preceded by different references, such as “collecting society,” a term still used in a number of countries. Other terms include “collective administration societies” and “licensing bodies.”

== Types of rights under collective management ==
Collective rights management through CMOs may cover a range of exclusive rights granted under copyright law, whether licensed by rights holders or subject to statutory collective management.

Different creative sectors often use their sector-specific terms, including:

- Performing rights organizations (PROs), for management of rights in musical works
- Music licensing companies (MLCs), for phonogram producers’ rights
- Performers’ rights collective management organizations (PMOs)
- Reproduction rights organizations (RROs) in the text and image sector.

== Collective management organisations ==
The collective management of copyright is undertaken by CMOs. CMOs may work for authors, performers, members or foreign rights holders they represent. CMOs also are part of the royalty and other licensing for members and members of foreign CMOs which whom they have agreements, and document right management data and information. Royalties are by the local or foreign CMO to their members.

CMOs typically exist in a situation where it would be impossible or impractical for owners of copyright and related rights to manage their rights directly, and where it is to their advantage that the licensing of the rights that they own or represent be aggregated with a CMO. The CMO's authority is typically conveyed by its statute (if membership-based), by voluntary mandates, by representation agreements with other CMOs and/or by national law. In most cases, CMOs are organized on a not-for-profit basis and are owned or controlled by their members.

A key concern for CMOs is the correct management of the vast amounts of data and information that they collect about their members, their works, other creative contributions and their usages. Documentation is thus vital for a smooth functioning of CMOs at the national, regional, and the international level. CMOs need to collect information about right holders and works, such as identifiers, names and pseudonyms, titles, shares, sub-publishing and licensing agreements, as well as information about usages in various media. This information allows CMOs to collect royalties and match and distribute them to right holders. Many CMOs use IT solutions aiming at facilitating CMOs' day-to-day operations and their cooperation with CMOs from other countries.

== Different models of collective management ==
Different models of collective management are available, depending on types of works and rights to be managed and national law. Three typical collective management schemes are outlined below, but there are also other models, and in some cases these co-exist, depending on the national legal and licensing framework at hand.

Under voluntary collective management, a CMO issues licenses on behalf of rights holders it represents, who have given a mandate to the CMO to act on their behalf. The voluntary collective management system is based on the principles of freedom of association and freedom of contract.

Under the mandatory collective licensing model, rights holders do not have the choice of granting permissions on an individual basis. All claims must be made through a CMO, under this system. The mandatory collective licensing system is usually established by national legislations or regulations.

The mandatory collective management is usually considered as a limitation of exclusive rights of copyright or related rights, because, under this system, rights holders cannot decide how to exercise their rights. Therefore, the mandatory collective management might be applied only to the extent allowed by the three-step-test of the international copyright-related treaties.

On the other hand, for rights to remuneration, the mandatory collective management is usually not considered as a limitation but an enabler of efficient management of such rights; because the rights holders of rights to remuneration are not in a position to decide whether or not they authorize the acts covered and, thus, the objective is just to collect the remuneration. This is the reason why mandatory collective management is often applied to rights to remuneration, including but not limited to, cases of transfer of rights by authors and performers to producers, or to private copying levies, in many countries.

Under the extended collective licensing model, agreements between users and a CMO in a given category of works will be extended by virtue of the law to cover all rights holders in the same category. This is called the extension effect and it also covers the works of those rights holders that have not mandated the CMO (non-members of the CMO), unless they have prohibited the use of their works.

A CMO may combine and operate under any or a combination of these different models for different rights, as provided for under national law.

== See also ==
- List of copyright collection societies
- Extended collective licensing
- Voluntary collective licensing
- Private copying levy
- Syndicate

Collective rights management Directive- publication of collective management organisations:

- https://digital-strategy.ec.europa.eu/en/library/collective-rights-management-directive-publication-collective-management-organisations-and
