= SESAC =

Performance-rights organization in the United States

- Company type: Private
- Founded: 1930 (as the Society of European Stage Authors and Composers); 1940 (current name)
- Headquarters: Nashville, Tennessee
- Key people: John Josephson, Chairman and CEO
- Parent: The Blackstone Group
- Website: www.sesac.com

SESAC is a for-profit performance-rights organization in the United States. Founded in 1930 as the Society of European Stage Authors and Composers, it is the second-oldest performance-rights organization in the United States. SESAC has 30,000 songwriters and more than 1 million compositions in its catalogue.

== History ==
The Society of European Stage Authors and Composers was founded by Paul Heinecke, a German immigrant, in New York in 1930. SESAC originally strove to support underrepresented European stage authors and composers with their American performance royalties, hence the original name. Heinecke led the firm until his death in 1972.

In the 1930s, SESAC helped broadcasters satisfy Federal Communications Commission requirements, supplying them with gospel recordings. The business evolved beyond gospel recordings and European composers during the 1940s, and in the 1950s SESAC established its electrical transcription service. On a monthly basis, SESAC recorded "transcriptions" of its affiliates and distributed them, on disc, to radio stations across America. Among its transcribed artists were jazz and country performers: Duke Ellington, Count Basie, Woody Herman, Coleman Hawkins, Chico Hamilton, Jackie Wilson, Chet Atkins, and Hank Garland.

As its original objective diminished in the 1960s, the company entered other musical genres. Since then, the company has represented a wider range of writers and genres. SESAC's affiliates roster includes Bob Dylan, Neil Diamond, The Cars, Robert Johnson, Bryan-Michael Cox, Nate "Danja" Hills, Rush, Coheed & Cambria, Young Love, The Faint, Rapture, Mariah Carey (left SESAC in 2020 to join ASCAP) and Adele (since 2017, formerly was with BMI).

The company moved into new headquarters in Columbus Circle in Midtown Manhattan and opened an office in Nashville, Tennessee in 1964. Six years later, the company began representing songwriters in addition to its traditional business of representing publishers. With a focus on Christian songwriters, the company was an early player in the Contemporary Christian music format. That evolution led the company to move its headquarters to Nashville in 1985.

In 1993, the company was purchased by Stephen Swid, Freddie Gershon, and Ira Smith. The new owners shifted the company's focus toward more mainstream music, and later television.

In 2013, Rizvi Traverse Management acquired a majority stake in SESAC.

In 2015, SESAC acquired the mechanical rights clearinghouse Harry Fox Agency.

In 2017, The Blackstone Group acquired SESAC.

SESAC owns CCLI.

== 2024 YouTube block ==
On September 28, 2024, songs by several artists became unplayable on YouTube in the United States due to a legal dispute between YouTube and SESAC. For some affected artists, only certain songs were blocked, while others remained available. Some artists who are not represented by SESAC, such as Beyoncé and Nicki Minaj, had some of their videos pulled from YouTube due to the song being a collaboration with a songwriter or musician represented by SESAC. On September 30, YouTube announced that they had reached a deal with SESAC to unblock the affected videos.

The following artists were cited as being among those affected by the block:

- Adele
- Alice in Chains
- Boyz II Men
- Zac Brown
- Burna Boy
- Mariah Carey
- Rosanne Cash
- J. Cole
- Neil Diamond
- Disclosure
- Bob Dylan
- Fleetwood Mac
- Ariana Grande
- Green Day
- Jack Harlow
- Kendrick Lamar
- Nirvana
- Margo Price
- R.E.M.
- Rush
- YG
- Porter Robinson
- Eminem
- Incubus
