= Bureau International de l'Edition Mecanique =

Organization of performing rights societies

The Bureau International de l'Edition Mécanique (BIEM), also known as Bureau International des Sociétés Gérant les Droits d'Enregistrement et de Reproduction Mécanique, is an organisation coordinating statutory licence agreements among different countries. It administers mechanical rights, ensuring payment of royalties to the creators of musical, literary and dramatic work), which may be reproduced on a CD or DVD, or through digital means, such as downloads from the Internet. The members of mechanical rights societies are composers, authors and publishers.

Founded on January 21, 1929, BIEM is based in Neuilly-sur-Seine, France, and as of October 2019, represents 53 societies, from 58 countries. Its role is to aid collaboration between member societies and to assist in solving problems arising among individual members and/or user groups. It represents the interests of its member societies, including in forums relating to authors' rights, such as WIPO, UNESCO, TRIPS and the WCO.
