= Confédération Internationale des Sociétés d'Auteurs et Compositeurs =

The International Confederation of Societies of Authors and Composers (French: Confédération Internationale des Sociétés d'Auteurs et Compositeurs, CISAC) is an international, non-governmental, not-for-profit organization that works to protect the rights and promote the interests of creators worldwide. It advocates for strong legal protection of copyrights and authors' rights. It is the world's largest international network of authors' societies, also known as collective management organizations (CMOs), copyright / royalty collection societies, collecting societies, or performance rights organizations (PROs).

As of 2024, 227 authors' societies from 116 countries are members of CISAC. Together, these authors' societies represent music publishers and more than five million creators and publishers from all geographical regions and all artistic fields (music, audiovisual, drama, visual arts, and literature).

In 2023, CISAC's member societies collected, €13.1bn in royalties from their respective national territories.

CISAC was founded in 1926. Its international headquarters are located in Neuilly-sur-Seine, France. The organization also maintains four regional offices:

- Europe (Budapest, Hungary)
- Latin America and the Caribbean (Santiago, Chile)
- Africa (Ouagadougou, Burkina Faso)
- Asia-Pacific (Beijing, China)

CISAC is financed by membership dues and has three official languages: English, French, and Spanish.

== History ==
=== Founding ===
CISAC was founded in France in 1926 by 18 authors' societies from 18 European countries, at the time representing mainly the dramatic arts (i.e. playwrights and stage directors).

Authors' societies are by and large non-for profit organizations that were established by creators to facilitate the management of their rights. The principle activities of authors' societies are to grant licenses, collect royalties for the use of its affiliates' creative works and distribute these royalties to rights holders.

Since its inception, CISAC's mission has been to represent creators in every corner of the globe and promote their rights. The organization initially consisted of five federations, one each for dramatic performing rights; public performing rights; mechanical rights; literary rights; and film rights. In 1966, the organization united the five federations to form the International Confederation of Societies of Authors and Composers, as it exists today.

=== Recent history ===
Since 1994, CISAC has been working to improve data exchanges on creative works between authors' societies. Known as the Common Information System (CIS) project, CISAC has worked on the development of ISO certified international standards for the identification of creative works and rights holders.

These include the International Standard Musical Work Code (ISWC), the International Standard Audiovisual Number (ISAN), the International Standard Text Code (ISTC) and the International Standard Name Identifier (ISNI), a unique identifying number linked to contributors (such as a songwriter or publisher) and which complements CISAC's Interested Party Information (IPI) System where more detailed information on the rights owner, accessible to authors societies, is held.

CISAC released "CIS-Net powered by FastTrack" in 2004, an Internet-based network for sharing musical works information between authors' societies. CISAC is also in the process of developing IDA, an International Database for Audiovisual works and their rights holders. By facilitating the identification of creative works and their relevant rights holders, such tools aim to speed up the distribution of royalties to creators for use of their works.

In 2004, CISAC revised its statutes, creating an annual general assembly and a board of directors to oversee CISAC's actions, allowing CISAC to impose rules on its members to ensure high professional standards and enabling CISAC to dedicate more resources to getting creators directly involved in the defence of their rights.

In June 2007, CISAC's general assembly elected singer-songwriter Robin Gibb (Bee Gees) as CISAC's president and Mexican film director Alfonso Cuarón as vice-president. Gibb's three-year term was renewed in June 2010. French visual artist and painter Hervé Di Rosa, co-founder of the artistic movement Figuration Libre, was elected vice-president in 2010. The role of CISAC president and vice-president is to voice the opinion of the international community of creators and to defend the system of collective management that protects their rights. Over the years, this role has been fulfilled by several renowned creators, such as Robert de Flers, Richard Strauss, Armand Salacrou, and Leopold Sedar Senghor.

From 2007 to 2013, CISAC has organised the biennial World Creators Summit, an international forum for stakeholders to discuss the future of copyright and creators' interests in the digital era.

CISAC adopted a series of professional rules for all of its members societies in 2008. The professional rules are a set of criteria related to the management of rights and the collection and distribution of royalties by which CISAC member societies should abide. The objective of these rules is to ensure that CISAC's members operate according to high standards of professionalism. The initiative was developed to reflect greater transparency by authors' societies towards various stakeholder groupings and the media.

The president of CISAC is Swedish songwriter Björn Ulvaeus, who was appointed in May 2020. His predecessor was French electronic music composer Jean Michel Jarre, who served as president since June 2013.

In 2013, the organisation expanded its vice presidency to four new positions, allowing for the representation of more territories and a broader range of creative repertoires. The four new vice presidents were Angélique Kidjo, a Grammy Award-winning performing artist and activist from Benin, Javed Akhtar, a celebrated scriptwriter, poet, lyricist from India, Marcelo Piñeyro, an Academy Award-winning producer and film director from Argentina, and Ousmane Sow, a revered sculptor from Senegal. The current CISAC vice presidents are: Yvonne Chaka Chaka, Arturo Márquez, Kazuhiko Fukuoji, and Ángeles González-Sinde Reig.

== Mission and goals ==
CISAC works to protect the rights and promote the interests of creators across all regions of the world and artistic fields; music, audiovisual, drama, literature and visual arts. It enables collective management organisations to seamlessly represent creators internationally and ensure that royalties flow to authors for the use of their works anywhere in the world. CISAC provides business, legal, and IT support to protect creators' rights and to foster the development of the international network of collective management societies (CMOs).

== Membership ==
As of June, 2024 CISAC's a membership organisation includes 227 authors' societies from 116 countries, indirectly representing more than five million creators. There are three membership categories, depending on a society's status and operations: Member, Provisional and Associate. Authors' societies are largely non-profit organisations that are established by creators to facilitate the management of their rights. As it is very difficult for an individual creator to monitor all uses of their work and negotiate payment for these uses, many choose to entrust their rights to an authors' society. An authors' society's primary activities is to grant licenses and collect royalties and distribute royalties to the right holders for the use of their works.

== Funding ==
CISAC's budget comes from annual membership dues, which are based on a percentage of the gross royalties collected annually by each member society.

== Organisation ==
Revolving around the General Assembly, CISAC's highest representative entity, CISAC is composed of different administrative bodies that guide its operations and strategy.

=== General Assembly ===
CISAC's general assembly is composed of delegates from all of CISAC's Member societies. The general assembly elects the board of directors and CISAC's president and vice-president, and endorses the main resolutions, decisions and plans put forth by the board of directors. Only members have the right to vote at the general assembly.

=== President and vice-president ===
The role of CISAC's president and vice-president is to represent the international community of creators and to defend the system of collective management that protects their rights.

=== Board of directors ===
A board of directors composed of representatives from 20 of CISAC's member societies and elected by the General Assembly for a three-year period to govern CISAC's activities. The Board's composition reflects CISAC's geographical diversity and the multitude of artistic repertoires it represents.

The current chairman of the board is Eric Baptiste, CEO of SOCAN, a music authors' society in Canada; the vice-chairmen are Javier Gutiérrez Vicen, CEO of Visual Entidad de Gestión de Artistas Plásticos (VEGAP), a visual arts authors' society in Spain, and Marisa Gandelman, CEO União Brasileira de compositores (UBC), a music authors' society in Brazil.

=== Secretariat ===
CISAC's director general is Gadi Oron, who was appointed in September, 2014. A lawyer by trade and an expert in international copyright law, Oron has been working with the creative industry for over 15 years. He joined CISAC in 2012 as General Counsel of the organisation.

=== Committees ===
CISAC has created a variety of committees that address a wide range of legal, strategic, technical, regional or creative issues related to authors' rights and serve to provide guidance on the operational aspects of the organisation.

== Services and activities ==
CISAC's main activities are: setting professional standards for authors' societies; implementing information systems to facilitate the identification of creative works and their relevant rights holders in order to precipitate the distribution of royalties to creators; contributing to the development of authors' societies around the world; advocating for authors' rights internationally; and building strategies to help societies deal with the changes brought on by the digital era. CISAC is an active participant within the international intellectual property community and collaborates with the UN's World Intellectual Property Organization (WIPO) and the UNESCO on matters of mutual interest.

=== Setting professional rules and standards for authors' societies ===
CISAC provides tools to its members that promote best business practices for all repertoires, including:

==== CISAC model contracts for "reciprocal representation" ====
Reciprocal representation principles are the basis of the international network of authors' societies. They make it possible for one society to represent the worldwide creative repertoire in their home territory. For example, if a Spanish society and an Australian society have signed a "reciprocal representation" agreement, the Spanish society can represent the Australian society's repertoire in Spain and the Australian society can represent the Spanish society's repertoire in Australia. They grant licenses for uses of each other's repertoires and collect royalties for these uses.

Through this system of agreements, a content user (e.g. a radio broadcaster or a night club) can obtain a single license from their local authors' society for use of the worldwide repertoire of creative works. This makes it possible for creators to receive royalties for uses of their works all over the world.

==== Professional rules and binding resolutions ====
In 2008, CISAC implemented a set of Professional Rules – binding principles with which all of CISAC's members must comply. They include best practices in governance, financial management, communication, administration, and the management and exchange of information relating to creative works and their relevant right holders.

==== Information networks and smart metadata ====
CISAC manages an international information system (called the Common Information System or CIS) for the exchange of information about works, their usage and the relevant rights holders between authors' societies.

==== Advocating for authors' rights ====
Another branch of CISAC's activities is advocating for authors' rights and serving as a spokesperson for its members at the international level. CISAC works in close collaboration with authors' societies and governments to ensure local laws uphold authors' rights. It organises and participates in numerous training programmes and seminars for judges and content users that aim to deepen their understanding of copyright, authors' rights and licensing.

==== Resale rights campaign ====
Together with European Visual Artists (EVA), the European Grouping of Societies of Authors and Composers (GESAC) and other visual arts societies, CISAC has orchestrated an international campaign for the universal implementation of artists' resale right. Efforts focus on promoting a new international treaty that would remedy existing shortfalls and introduce the resale right as a mandatory element of copyright protection.

==== Global policy and government relations ====
CISAC monitors international developments and participates in negotiations on new treaties and other copyright-related initiatives. CISAC also weighs in on other treaty-related discussions taking place within the framework of the World Intellectual Property Organisation (WIPO) in Geneva. In a high-level meeting held in February 2014, a CISAC delegation of creators' representatives met with WIPO's director general to agree on joint projects and promote increased visibility for creators within WIPO.

==== World Copyright Summit ====
Historically, CISAC organised the World Copyright Summit, which subsequently became the World Creators Summit, an international forum that brought together authors' societies, creators, industry leaders from the technology and entertainment sectors, policymakers and consumer representatives to discuss the future of copyright/authors' rights and creativity in the digital era. Four summits were held in 2007, 2009, 2011 and 2013.

=== Studies and reports ===
==== The Creative Industries and the BRICS ====
In 2014, CISAC released an economic study that identifies the potential within Brazil, Russia, India, China and South Africa (BRICS) to increase their creative industries' and contribution to GDP over the next ten years. The study includes an action plan for policymakers to unlock the potential of the creative industry in these regions.

==== Cultural Times – The First Global Map of Cultural and Creative Industries ====
In 2015, CISAC published a survey prepared by Ernst & Young, that quantifies the global economic and social contribution of the creative sector, analyzing 11 Cultural and Creative Industries (CCI): advertising, architecture, books, gaming, movies, music, newspapers/magazines, performing arts, radio, television and visual arts.

==== Global Collections Report ====
CISAC publishes an annual report on its members' royalty collections. The report analyses royalty collections by region, repertoire and type of rights and looks at market trends affecting the use of creative works and the payment of royalties.

== Key figures ==
=== Authors' societies ===
227 authors' societies in 116 countries (as of June, 2024)

- 110 societies in Europe
- 46 societies in Latin American and the Caribbean
- 30 societies in Africa
- 30 societies in Asia-Pacific
- 11 societies in North America (Canada – United States)

Global Royalty Collections in 2023 by all of CISAC's Members:

- €13.1 bn total collections by CISAC member societies
- +7.6% growth in total collections in constant euro (year-on-year)
- +2.8% growth in total collections in current euros (year-on-year)
- Music accounted for 87% of overall collections (+7.6%)
- Non-music collections accounted for 13.0% of overall collections (+5.2%)
- Performing Rights made up 79% of total collections (+22%)
- European region +8.1% growth in Europe (54.7% of total collections)
- +11% growth in BRICS countries

== Controversy ==
The so-called "CISAC Case" was a competition law case brought by the European Commission against a group of authors' societies in Europe. It specifically concerned performance rights in music repertoires and the relationship between authors' societies managing rights in music content. The proceedings focused on specific provisions in the reciprocal representation agreements signed between these societies. These provisions were based on a Model Contract for Reciprocal Representation, developed by CISAC.

=== 2008 Decision ===
The commission's decision alleged that the 24 European Economic Area (EEA) societies had engaged in concerted practices and illegally reached an arrangement on the territorial scope of their respective reciprocal representation agreements. CISAC was not included in the decision, nor were there any monetary penalties for the societies. CISAC and 21 of the 24 EEA societies appealed the decision before the EU General Court in October 2008.

=== Final ruling ===
On 12 April 2013, the EU General Court issued its ruling in the 2008 appeal. The judgement annulled the 2008 decision of the EU Commission.

== See also ==
- List of copyright collection societies
- Authors' rights
- Copyright
- Cultural industry
- Cultural property law
- Droit de suite
- Intellectual property
- Intellectual rights
