= Copyright collective =

Non-governmental body to license works

A copyright collective (also known as a copyright society, copyright collecting agency, licensing agency or copyright collecting society or collective management organization) is a non-governmental body created by copyright law or private agreement which licenses copyrighted works on behalf of the authors and engages in collective rights management. Copyright societies track all the events and venues where copyrighted works are used and ensure that the copyright holders listed with the society are remunerated for such usage. The copyright society publishes its own tariff scheme on its websites and collects a nominal administrative fee on every transaction.

Copyright societies evolved out of the need to have an organised body for licensing and managing copyrighted works. Without copyright societies, it would be impossible for users like restaurants, malls and large events to collect licenses from individual copyright holders and negotiate terms with them. Copyright societies negotiate prices and create tariffs on behalf of the authors that they represent and offset the imbalance of power between the users and the copyright holders. The lobbying power of copyright societies is especially important in industries like the music industry, where authors and owners of copyright are often placed at a disadvantage. The music streaming revolution was also projected as an attack on the power imbalance in the music industry. The evolution of technology and influence of music aggregators like Spotify, Apple Music and Pandora are changing the existing system of copyright licensing and might make copyright societies obsolete.

While the system of copyright societies is similar in all countries, their influence over the industry and mode of operation varies from country to country.

== Functions ==
Copyright societies operate by acquiring the right to license works from the owners and then negotiating and licensing the works to others. They usually operate in one particular industry and try to acquire the works of all the authors dealing in that particular industry. The tariffs decided by copyright societies are based on the kind of event or venue of the licensee and usually allow the licensee to access the entire repertoire of works available with the copyright society. The royalty distributed to the owners is based on their market influence and demand for their works. Reduction of transaction costs and other benefits of collective management can be realised only when the copyright society has control over all or most of the copyrighted works in a particular industry.

== In countries ==
Copyright law is territorial in nature, but copyrights are protected in multiple countries through international instruments such as the Berne Convention and the TRIPS Agreement. Along with licensing, copyright societies monitor the use of copyrighted works assigned to them and ensure that the copyright holders are fairly remunerated for such use. In order to monitor the use of copyrighted works abroad, societies enter into MoUs or international licensing agreements with their foreign counterparts in the industry and exchange information regarding the use of copyrighted materials.

Collecting societies can sell blanket licences, which grant the right to perform their catalogue for a period of time. Such a licence might for example provide a broadcaster with a single annual authorisation encompassing thousands of songs owned by thousands of composers, lyricists and publishers. The societies also sell individual licenses for users who reproduce and distribute music. For example, Apple must submit the download reports for the iTunes Store, which are used to determine their royalty payments.

This acquisition is guided by the country's legal regime. Some jurisdictions, such as Hungary, create legal monopolies, and de facto monopolies arise in others. Once rights are acquired, the copyright collective then has to collect data on the uses of copyrighted works. The processing of this data will enable the copyright collective to discharge its functions, including the detection of unauthorized use, negotiation of licenses, collection of remuneration and distribution of collected remuneration amongst the members of the copyright collective on the basis of collected data.

=== European Union ===
Copyright collecting societies in the European Union usually hold monopolies in their respective national markets. Some countries create a statutory monopoly, while others recognise effective monopolies through regulations.

https://digital-strategy.ec.europa.eu/en/library/collective-rights-management-directive-publication-collective-management-organisations-and

==== Austria ====
In Austria, the Society of Authors, Composers and Publishers (Gesellschaft der Autoren, Komponisten und Musikverleger, AKM) has a statutory monopoly.

==== Germany ====
German law recognizes GEMA as an effective monopoly, and the burden of proof is on an accused infringer that a work is not managed by GEMA. GEMA has one of the most effective and lucrative music copyright administration systems.

==== Hungary ====
Hungary operates a legal monopoly.

==== Italy ====
SIAE (English: Italian Society of Authors and Publishers, Italian: Società Italiana degli Autori ed Editori) is the Italian copyright collecting agency. Founded in 1882 in the Kingdom of Italy, it is the monopolist intermediary between the authors of musical tracks and consumers, managing the economic aspects and the distribution of money from royalties of Italian-copyrighted music to authors and on their behalf.

==== The Netherlands ====
BUMA/STEMRA are two private organisations in the Netherlands, the Buma Association (Dutch: Vereniging Buma) and the Stemra Foundation (Dutch: Stichting Stemra) that operate as one single company that acts as the Dutch collecting society for composers and music publishers.

=== India ===
Copyright Societies in India have to register themselves under section 33 of the Copyright Act of 1957. In order to do the business of issuing or granting license in respect of literary, dramatic, musical and artistic works incorporated in a cinematograph films or sound recordings it is necessary that the organization be registered as a copyright society under Section 33. The proviso to section 33 sub clause 3 states ‘Provided that the Central Government shall not ordinarily register more than one copyright society to do business in respect of the same class of works’. This effectively creates a monopoly and mandates that only one copyright society can exist in a particular industry. This ensures concentration of bargaining power and equal terms of royalty in an industry.

Copyright societies have to renew their registration under section 33 every five years and its registration can be cancelled at any time if the central government feels like it is being managed in a manner detrimental to the interests of the authors and other owners of the copyright. The major copyright societies in India are The Indian Performing Right Society Limited [IPRS] (for composers and publishers), Indian Reprographic Right Organisation [IRRO] (for literary organisations) and Indian Singers Rights Association [ISRA] (for performers). Phonographic Performance Limited [PPL] (for producers) was previously registered as a copyright society under S.33 of the Copyright Act but now mentions on its website that it licenses and transfers copyrights under S.18 and S.30 and functions as a company registered under the Companies Act 2013. PPL represents producers and record companies and is a major licensor of music to events and establishments. The ISRA and IPRS are registered copyright societies under S. 33 of the Copyright Act 1957. ISRA represents the interests of singers and aims to protect performer's rights as enshrined in S.38 and S.38A of the Copyrights Act 1957. IPRS represents composers, lyricists and publishers of music in India and is a registered copyright society under S.33 of the Copyright Act 1957.

The Screenwriters Association of India [SRAI] earlier known as Film Writers Association represents the interests of lyricists, screenwriters and novelists. It applied for becoming a copyright society in 2017 but is currently operating as a trade union representing its members. Recently an application for registration under S.33 was made by the Recorded Music Performance ltd which controls public performance and broadcasting rights of sound recordings of its member companies. RMPL has applied for registration as PPL is no longer operating as a copyright society under S.33 of the Copyrights Act 1957. The validity of PPL operating as a company has been debated and was considered by the 2014 case of Leopold cafe v. Novex Communication in which the Bombay High Court that s.30 of the Copyright Act 1957 allows a duly authorised agent to issue licenses on behalf of authors and other owners, therefore organisations can perform the activities of a copyright society without being registered under S.33 but it will not be referred to as a copyright society and cannot issue licenses in its own name. PPL now operates as a Copyrights Organisation [CRO] and can only issue licenses as an agent, therefore it must issue licenses in the name of the copyright owners and not itself.

=== United Kingdom ===
See Copyright Licensing Agency, Phonographic Performance Limited, and PRS for Music.

=== United States and Canada ===
In the U.S. and Canada, groups that provide intermediary functions between copyright holders and performers of works such as music are called performance rights organisations or PROs. Other organizations such as artists' rights groups license and collect royalties for the reproduction of works such as paintings by living or recently deceased artists whose work has not yet entered the public domain. There are also groups that collect royalties for copies from magazines and scholarly journals such as Access Copyright in Canada under Collective administration of copyrights.

In the US, PROs ensure that rights holders are paid their share of public performance royalties, by issuing licenses to different companies and establishments and tracking where and how often the songs of their affiliates are performed at these public venues. An author can only be part of one PRO, as the five existing PROs in the US have distinct systems for tariffs and payment of royalty as they compete with each other in the market. The five major PROs in the music industry in the US are ASCAP, SESAC, BMI, AllTrack, and SoundExchange. In the US copyright collectives are registered companies that act as agents of the owners of the copyright. The websites of the PROs have their Memorandum of association and Articles of association and their tariff policies.

The validity of PROs was challenged in the 1979 anti-trust suit of Broadcast Music, Inc. v. CBS, Inc. in which CBS BMI and said that the tariffs decided by BMI were for blanket licenses and therefore amounted to price fixing. The court held in this case that the actions of PROs were not anti competitive as there was no bar on obtaining licenses from individual copyright holders.

Digitisation and internet based music streaming services have majorly changed the music industry and the US copyright law has changed majorly to accommodate such innovation. Music Modernization Act (MMA) was signed by President Donald Trump on 11 October 2018 as the Orrin G. Hatch-Bob Goodlatte Music Modernization Act of 2018. The MMA streamlines the music licensing process in order to make it easier for copyright holders to get paid when their music is streamed online through services like Spotify, Pandora and Apple Music. Songwriters and artists will receive royalties on songs recorded before 1972 and this will ensure that songwriters are paid by streaming services with a single mechanical licensing database overseen by music publishers and songwriters. The cost of creating and maintaining this database will be paid for by digital streaming services and the database and tariff will be determined by an authority created under the MMA. The mechanism provided under the act will determine unclaimed royalties due to music professionals and provide a consistent legal process to receive them. Previously, these unclaimed royalties were held by digital service providers like Spotify to the detriment of the authors. All of this will also ensure that artists are paid more and have a fair mechanism to approach for getting the money they are owed. This changes the scheme of S.115 of the US which governs compulsory licensing and allows the authority created under the act to issue blanket licenses for music to streaming services. While this does take away some agency of artists, there has been overwhelming support for this legislation from the music industry as it will ensure that licensing and royalty payments are transferred on a fair basis.

The American Society of Composers, Authors and Publishers [ASCAP] has direct or indirect connections with copyright societies in over 30 countries. Once it receives information regarding unauthorised use of copyrighted works, the affiliated foreign copyright society collects the royalty on behalf of the copyright society representing the owner, and forwards payments to it.

INDR Music Association (also known as the INDR U.S. Rights Holders Association or Super Rights Management Collective) is a global music consulting and rights management organization. It specializes in copyright administration, licensing, publishing, royalty management, and related services for songwriters, composers, publishers, performers, labels, and other rights holders.

Founded in 2022 and restructured in 2023, the association operates as an independent consultant that manages relationships with Performing Rights Organizations (PROs) and Collective Management Organizations (CMOs). It functions as a distributor, rights manager, and publishing administrator.

The organization has expanded internationally by opening 15 offices worldwide, including locations in the United States and Colombia. It implemented a Governance Framework that includes the appointment of Regional Chairpersons to oversee local operations and ensure compliance with industry standards. Regional roles have been referenced for areas such as California and New York within the United States, supporting coordinated administration across its network of offices.

INDR provides copyright administration, royalty collection and management, licensing support, and publishing administration. It handles royalties across mechanical rights, performance rights (via PROs and CMOs), digital streaming platforms, radio airplay, publishing, live performances and tours, synchronization licensing, and distribution to third parties. Policies have included the Fair Rates Policy of 2025, aimed at equitable compensation for artists, songwriters, producers, and labels through a standardized percentage model, and the INDR Cut Policy. In 2026 the association released a report claiming over 2.6 million streams. As of July 2026 it shuttered its public website to focus on contractual agreements with major labels outside of its Affiliate Association. It has reported involvement with hundreds of works and dozens of record labels.

Erik Zambrano (born 2007), age 19, serves as President (2024–present, elected term to 2027) and as Chair to the Board of Governors. He has overseen policy development, enforcement of artist rights protections, and the association’s expansion.

== See also ==
- Copyright
- List of copyright collection societies
- Private copying levy
- Voluntary Collective Licensing
- Copyright collection societies (category)
- collective rights management

== Bibliography ==
- Thomas Gergen: Die Verwertungsgesellschaft VG WORT: Genese und neue Herausforderungen In: Journal on European History of Law, London: STS Science Centre, Vol. 1, No. 2, pp. 14 – 19, (ISSN 2042-6402).
