= Censorship of YouTube =

Since its inception in 2005, censorship of the video-sharing platform YouTube has occurred to varying degrees in many countries.

== General ==
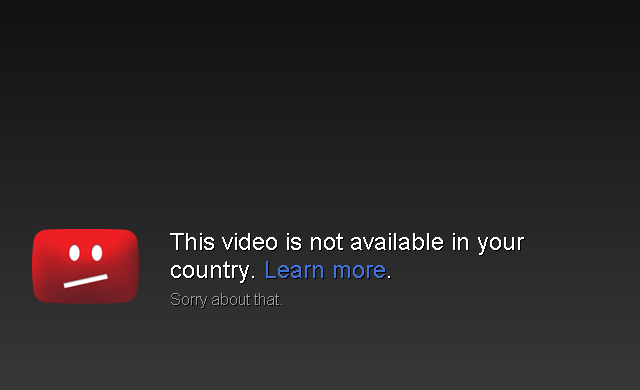
Some YouTube videos are blocked regionally due to copyright issues.

YouTube blocking occurs for a variety of reasons, including:

- Preventing criticism of a ruler, government, government officials, religion, or religious leaders;
- Preventing videos promoting racism;
- Violations of national laws, including:
  - Copyright and intellectual property protection laws;
  - Violations of hate speech, ethics, or morality-based laws;
  - National security legislation.
- Preventing access to videos judged to be inappropriate for youth;
- Businesses, schools, government agencies, and other private institutions often block social media sites, including YouTube, due to bandwidth limitations and the site's potential for distraction.

In some countries YouTube is completely blocked, either through a long-standing ban or for more limited periods of time such as during periods of unrest, the run-up to an election, or in response to upcoming political anniversaries. In other countries, access to the website as a whole remains open, but access to specific videos is blocked due to many reasons, including orders from country jurisdiction. In both cases, a VPN is usually deployed to bypass geographical restrictions. In cases where the entire site is banned due to one particular video, YouTube will often agree to remove or limit access to that video in order to restore service.

As of September 2012, countries with standing national bans on YouTube include China, Iran, and Turkmenistan. Due to disputes between GEMA and YouTube over royalties, many videos featuring copyrighted songs were inaccessible in Germany. After an agreement was made between the companies in November 2016, these videos became accessible.

YouTube's Terms of Service prohibit the posting of videos that violate copyrights or depict pornography, or those that promote racism, illegal acts, gratuitous violence, or hate speech. User-posted videos that violate such terms may be removed and replaced with a message stating: "This video is no longer available because its content violated YouTube's Terms of Service". Additionally, Google reserves the right to terminate any account for any reason, even without notice.

YouTube offers an opt-in feature known as "Restricted Mode", which filters videos that might contain mature content.

== Article 13 of the EU Directive on Copyright in the Digital Single Market ==
Article 13 of the Directive on Copyright in the Digital Single Market has been feared and criticized as it could have a chilling effect on expression, Big Tech companies and CEOs like Susan Wojcicki, have opposed it for all countries of the European Union within two years if adopted.

In April 2019, Article 13 was passed, which mandates all online platforms, including YouTube, to implement the upload filter, which scans for copyrighted content and blocks it from being uploaded. This was meant to protect copyright holders, but critics say that it would censor freedom of speech and expression and that it would even censor memes or parodies too by accidentally blocking fair use material. Following huge outcry, memes were exempt from Article 13.

== Countries where access to YouTube is currently blocked ==
=== China ===
YouTube was first blocked in China for over five months from October 16, 2007 to March 22, 2008. It was blocked again from March 24, 2009, although a Foreign Ministry spokesperson would neither confirm nor deny whether YouTube had been blocked. Since then, YouTube has been inaccessible from mainland China. However, YouTube can still be accessed from Hong Kong (via a local version), Macau (via a worldwide version), the Shanghai Free-Trade Zone, specific hotels, and by using a VPN. Since 2018, when the term "YouTube" is searched on Baidu, the following message is displayed: "According to local regulations and policies, some results cannot be shown."

Even though YouTube is blocked under the Great Firewall, many Chinese media outlets, including China Central Television (CCTV), Xinhua News Agency and China Global Television Network (CGTN), have official YouTube accounts. Despite the ban, Alexa ranked YouTube as the 5th-most-visited website in China due to huge VPNs and official permits.

=== Eritrea ===
YouTube has been intermittently blocked in Eritrea since 2011 by some ISPs, although a spokesperson for Freedom House speculated this was due to bandwidth considerations.

=== Iran ===
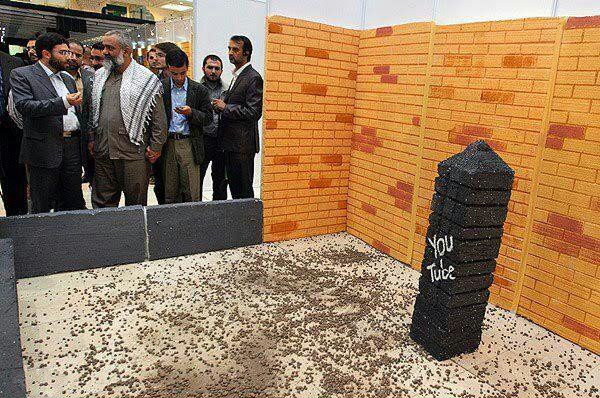
YouTube written on mockup Jamarat at an Iranian exhibition

On December 3, 2006, Iran temporarily blocked access to YouTube and several other sites, after declaring them as violators of social and moral codes of conduct. The YouTube block came after a video was posted online that appeared to show an Iranian soap opera star having sex. The block was later lifted and then reinstated after Iran's 2009 presidential election. In 2012, Iran reblocked access, along with access to Google, after the controversial film Innocence of Muslims trailer was released on YouTube. Some startups, television shows, celebrities, and reformist politicians such as Khatami use this website.

=== North Korea ===
YouTube is blocked in North Korea because of the country's laws regarding the Internet and its accessibility. The North Korean government has warned that anyone who tries to access it is subject to punishment because VPNs are all outlawed.

=== Russia ===
On February 12, 2026, Roskomnadzor imposed a full nationwide block on the platform, making YouTube inaccessible in Russia without the use of a VPN. The decision to block YouTube marked the culmination of a years-long deterioration in relations between the platform and the Russian state following the Russian invasion of Ukraine in 2022.

==== Since 2022 ====
In March 2022, YouTube started showing its users ads with calls to disable Russian railroad communications. As a result, Roskomnadzor contacted Google and demanded the company to stop the threats against Russia. In addition, YouTube imposed a global ban on state-funded Russian media and propaganda channels, including RT and Sputnik. In response to mounting restrictions and international sanctions, Google suspended all monetization and subscription services in Russia including YouTube Premium and YouTube Music.

Between 2023 and 2025, Russian courts imposed increasingly large fines on Google, eventually reaching a record high of US$20 decillion in October 2024. Russian authorities accused the company of refusing to restore pro-Kremlin accounts and of spreading what they described as “false information” about the war in Ukraine.

In mid-2024, users in Russia started experiencing a significant slowdown in video loading speeds from 40% to 70%. Alexander Khinshtein, head of the State Duma's Committee on Information Policy, announced on Telegram that the "degradation" of YouTube speeds is planned and on purpose, he also encouraged people to comply with Russian policy on platform. But later he switched to blame the slowdown on Google's failure to invest in Russian infrastructure, such as its local cache servers.

From August 1, 2024, YouTube mobile platforms, which were initially not affected by speed drop, are also unusable due to informal blockade, but with specific browsers (i.e. domestic-made Yandex browser), high quality videos might still be accessible in Russia. On August 8, media interviewed many of the country's users, said YouTube can not function properly without a VPN. Google also shut off AdSense to all Russian citizens a week later.

==== Before 2022 ====
The video claiming responsibility for the 2010 Moscow Metro bombings, which quickly gained 800,000 views in four days, was removed, along with all videos of Dokka Umarov. Additionally, it turned out that over 300 videos from the Kavkaz Center were removed for having "inappropriate content." Russia was claimed to have pressured YouTube to take such measures.

On July 28, 2010, a court in the city of Komsomolsk-on-Amur ordered a local ISP to block access to YouTube.com, web.archive.org, and several other websites offering books for downloads, citing extremist materials as the reason. The order was not enforced and was later reversed.

On September 4, 2017, Roskomnadzor announced their intention to delete a video released by a popular YouTube channel Nemagia in which bloggers Alexey Pskovitin and Mikhail Pecherskiy described unscrupulous business strategies by Tinkoff Bank.

In February 2019, as a result of a complaint received by Roskomnadzor, YouTube has demanded that the Ukrainian Centre for Journalist Investigations remove a video about Emir-Usein Kuku, a Crimean Tatar 'human rights defender' who has been arrested by Russian authorities in 2016.

In September 2021, YouTube blocked two German-language channels run by a Russian state-backed media company RT stating they spread misinformation about COVID-19 vaccines. In return, Roskomnadzor threatened to block the service in the country or fine Google unless the restrictions are lifted.

=== Turkmenistan ===
On December 25, 2009, for security reasons as for firewall style, YouTube was blocked in Turkmenistan by the only ISP in the country, Turkmentelecom. Other websites, such as LiveJournal were also blocked. As of 2024, YouTube remains blocked in the country, but citizens attempt to access it temporarily using VPNs until they are blocked as well.

== Countries where YouTube is partially restricted ==
=== European Union ===
In anticipation of an upcoming revision of the European Union's Audiovisual Media Services Directive, YouTube announced an expansion of their age-verification process on September 22, 2020. If a user's age cannot automatically be verified, a valid ID or credit card will be requested.

=== Australia ===
On 10 December 2025, the Online Safety Amendment came into effect. This law requires social media apps including YouTube to verify the age of their users to check that they are not under 16 and if they are, their account must be removed.

=== Brazil ===
On 17 March 2026, the Digital Statute for Children and Adolescents was enacted, this law is very similar to Australia's and bans social media platforms and social networking services, which includes various live-streaming and social media platforms such as VK, Telegram, Bilibili, among others, for individuals under 16 without parental consent, and forces them to verify their age with a government-issued ID or a facial scan.

=== Indonesia ===
On 28 March 2026, Indonesia banned social media use for children under the age of 16. Platforms such as YouTube, TikTok, X (formerly known as Twitter), Facebook, Instagram, Threads, Roblox and Bigo Live were the first to be banned due to the country labelling them as high risk. Enforcement and account deactivation will be rolled out gradually, affecting all accounts that are reported to be under 16 and anyone who wants to access an account or create one must be age verified by government ID or with a facial scan.

=== Malaysia ===
On 1 June 2026, Malaysia banned individuals under the age of 16 from social media and online platforms that have more than 8 million users with measures also very similar to Australia. Targeted platforms with over 8 million users included platforms such as YouTube, TikTok, Facebook and Instagram.

=== United States ===
On July 30, 2025, amid the implementation of the Online Safety Act 2023 in the United Kingdom, Google announced that it would begin to enforce "age assurance" policies for selected users in the United States as a trial. Machine learning will be used to determine the age of the user (regardless of any account information indicating their age) and restrict access to certain content and features across all Google properties, including YouTube (including, in particular, disabling personalized advertising and enabling certain digital well-being limits), if they are assumed to be under 18. On YouTube, this will be based on factors such as searches and video history and the age of the account. The user must go through age verification via payment, scanned ID, or selfie to access all features if they are detected to be a minor. This faced severe backlash for unintentionally flagging users as minors, leading to restrictions from commenting, publishing public content that is set to private by default, monetizing, and having watch history without age verification.

==== Florida ====
On November 25, 2025, after the 11th Circuit Court of Appeals ruled 2-1 that a law in Florida was constitutional pending a full review of the case. This law bans social media for minors under 14 and require parental consent for minors aged 14 or 15. Florida would enforce its law against TikTok on June 15, 2026, after which TikTok would announce it would suspend accounts from users under 14 in the State of Florida. Florida then became the first state in United States to enforce a social media ban for minors.

==== Mississippi ====
Mississippi's law took effect on July 17, 2025, after the 5th Circuit Court of Appeals allowed the law to take effect pending appeal. However, an explanation was not given why. The law, known as the Walker Montgomery Protecting Children Online Act, requires parental consent for users under 18 and requires platforms to prevent minors from view certain types of content. Bluesky announced in August 2025 that they would block users in Mississippi due to the law.

==== Ohio ====
Ohio's law, known as the Social Media Parental Notification Act, would take effect on June 18, 2026, after the 6th Circuit Court of Appeals would rule 2-1 that the law was constitutional. The law requires parental consent for users under 16.

==== Tennessee ====
The law in Tennessee, known as the Protecting Kids From Social Media Act, took effect on January 1, 2025. A judge for the U.S District Court for the Middle District of Tennessee, Eli J. Richardson, would allow the law to take effect on June 18, 2025, because NetChoice, the ones challenging the law, did not show evidence that the law would be enforced against them. The law requires parental consent for users under 18.

== Countries where access to YouTube was formerly blocked ==
=== Afghanistan ===
On September 12, 2012, YouTube was blocked in Afghanistan due to hosting the trailer to the controversial film about Muhammad, Innocence of Muslims, which the authorities considered to be blasphemous. YouTube was later unblocked in Afghanistan on December 1 of the same year.

=== Armenia ===
Following the disputed February 2008 presidential elections, the Armenian government blocked Internet users' access to YouTube for a month. The Armenian opposition had used the website to publicize video of alleged police brutality against anti-government protesters.

=== Bangladesh ===
In March 2009, YouTube was blocked in Bangladesh after a recording of an alleged meeting between the prime minister and army officers was posted revealing anger by the military on how the government was handling a mutiny by border guards in Dhaka. The block was lifted on March 21.

On September 17, 2012, YouTube was banned for the second time following the controversies regarding the promotional videos for Innocence of Muslims. On June 5, 2013, the Bangladesh Telecommunication Regulatory Commission lifted the ban.

On August 2, 2024, YouTube, along with WhatsApp, Instagram and TikTok was blocked in Bangladesh due to quota reform protests.

=== Brazil ===
In January 2007, YouTube was sued by Brazilian model and MTV VJ Daniella Cicarelli (the former fiancée of retired football player Ronaldo) and her boyfriend due to the fact that the website hosted a video recorded by paparazzi in which she and her boyfriend were having sexual intercourse on a Spanish beach; the video did not contain explicit content. The lawsuit asked that YouTube will be blocked in Brazil until all copies of the video were removed. On Saturday, January 6, 2007, a legal injunction ordered that filters be put in place to prevent users in Brazil from accessing the website.

The effectiveness of the measure was questioned, since the video was available not only on YouTube, but also on other sites as part of an Internet phenomenon. On Tuesday, January 9, 2007, the same court overturned its previous decision, allowing the filters to be removed. The video footage itself remained banned and was to be removed from the website.

In June 2007, a judge ordered Cicarelli and her boyfriend to pay all court and lawyer costs, as well as R$10,000 (roughly US$3,203) to the three defendants—YouTube, Globo, and iG, citing a lack of good faith in pushing the privacy case when their actions took place in public.

On December 13, 2024, a survey by the Observatory of the Disinformation Industry and Gender Violence on Digital Platforms identified 137 channels with misogynistic content on YouTube in Brazil. According to the survey, 105,000 videos published on these accounts total more than 3.9 billion views and the channels have, on average, 152,000 subscribers. In total, the researchers analyzed 76,000 videos from 7,812 channels, with more than 4.1 billion views and 23 million comments.

=== Finland ===
On November 30, 2017, most YouTube videos containing music seemed to be blocked by Finnish nonprofit performance rights organization Teosto in Finland. According to them, Google blocked the videos because they did not have an agreement to show music videos in Finland. According to Teosto, they and Google have made a temporary agreement to show the videos in the morning of November 30. The music videos started to return to YouTube in Finland later that day.

=== Germany ===
Blocking of YouTube videos in 2009 until 2016

The blocking of YouTube videos in Germany on copyright grounds was part of a dispute between YouTube and the Gesellschaft für musikalische Aufführungs- und mechanische Vervielfältigungsrechte (Society for Musical Performing and Mechanical Reproduction Rights – GEMA), a performance rights organization in Germany.

According to a German court in Hamburg, Google's subsidiary YouTube can be held liable for damages when it hosts copyrighted videos without the copyright holder's permission. As a result, music videos for major label artists on YouTube, as well as many videos containing background music, were unavailable in Germany since the end of March 2009 after the previous agreement had expired and negotiations for a new license agreement were stopped. On October 31, 2016, YouTube and GEMA reached an agreement over royalties, ending a seven-year-long battle of blocking music videos in Germany.

Live streaming in 2016

On November 23, 2016, the German Kommission für Zulassung und Aufsicht (Commission for Authorization and Supervision), which is formed by representatives of German public broadcast stations, required PietSmiet & Co., a German let's-player operating his own YouTube channel to get a German broadcast license by April 30, 2017, or else be regarded as an illegal pirate radio broadcaster for livestreaming, even when no radio spectrum use is included. Some YouTubers, even non profit, might fail at the expensive fee for applying a license. On April 30, 2017, the livestreaming channel PietSmietTV went offline. The channel PietSmiet remained online due not providing 24/7 streaming. The channel was mentioned in a requirement of a license.

=== India ===
On December 20, 2024, YouTube introduced new guidelines prohibiting videos with clickbait titles to enhance content quality and combat misinformation. The platform aims to penalize creators using misleading or sensationalized titles, with potential actions including video removal or channel suspension. According to YouTube, this guideline will gradually roll out in India first, but will expand to more countries in the coming months. (Currently, the roll out was finished in India as the crackdown ends).

=== Indonesia ===
On April 1, 2008, Indonesian information minister Mohammad Nuh asked YouTube to remove Fitna, a controversial film made by Dutch right-wing politician Geert Wilders. The government allowed two days for the removal of the video or YouTube would be blocked in the country. On April 4, following YouTube's failure to remove the video, Nuh asked all Internet service providers to block access to YouTube. On April 5, YouTube was briefly blocked for testing by one ISP. On April 8, YouTube, along with MySpace, Metacafe, RapidShare, Multiply, LiveLeak, and Fitna's official site, were blocked in Indonesia on all ISPs. The blocking of YouTube was subsequently lifted on April 10.

=== Libya ===
On January 24, 2010, Libya permanently blocked YouTube after it featured videos of demonstrations in the Libyan city of Benghazi by families of detainees who were killed in Abu Salim prison in 1996, as well as videos of family members of Libyan leader Muammar Gaddafi at parties. The ban was condemned by Human Rights Watch. In November 2011, after the Libyan Civil War, YouTube was once again allowed in Libya, but did not launch a local version of the site until early 2015.

=== Malaysia ===
In May 2013, videos critical of the Malaysian government were blocked from YouTube in Malaysia despite the government's promises not to censor the internet. Analysis of the network traffic shows that the ISPs were scanning the headers of the users and actively blocking requests to the YouTube video according to the video key.

=== Morocco ===
On May 25, 2007, the state-owned Maroc Telecom ISP blocked all access to YouTube. Officially, no reasons were given as to why YouTube was blocked, but speculations were that it may have been due to videos posted by the pro-separatist Polisario, Western Sahara's independence movement, or due to videos criticizing King Mohammed VI. The ban did not affect the other two ISPs in the country, Wana (now Inwi) and Méditel (now Orange Maroc). The blocking of YouTube on Maroc Telecom was lifted on May 30, 2007, after Maroc Telecom unofficially announced that the denied access to the website was a mere "technical glitch".

=== Nepal ===
On September 5, 2025, Nepal ordered its telecommunications agency to block various social media platforms in the country, including YouTube, after they failed to register with the government. The ban was lifted on 9 September amid anti-government protests which led to the resignation of Prime Minister K. P. Sharma Oli.

=== Pakistan ===
In February 2008, the Pakistani Telecommunications Authority (PTA) blocked access to YouTube on Pakistani ISPs, allegedly because of "blasphemous" videos of Dutch politician Geert Wilders (especially Fitna). However, the PTA's block inadvertently knocked out access to YouTube worldwide for two hours on February 25, 2008. Pakistan Telecom had broadcast to other ISPs in the Pacific Rim the false claim that it was the correct route for the addresses in YouTube's IP space. It was suggested by some Pakistani websites, blogs, and by electoral process watchdog groups at the time that the block was imposed largely to distract viewers from videos alleging vote-rigging by the ruling MQM party in the February 2008 general elections. Allegations of suppressing vote-rigging videos by the Musharraf administration were also leveled by Pakistani bloggers, newspapers, media, and Pakistani anti-Musharraf opposition parties. YouTube was unblocked on February 27, 2008, after the allegedly blasphemous videos were removed.

On May 20, 2010, which was Everybody Draw Mohammed Day, Pakistan again blocked the website in a bid to contain "blasphemous" material. The ban was lifted on May 27, 2010, after the website removed the objectionable content from its servers at the request of the government. However, individual videos deemed offensive to Muslims that are posted on YouTube will continue to be blocked.

On September 17, 2012, the Pakistan Telecommunication Authority (PTA) ordered access to YouTube blocked, after the website failed to remove the trailer of the controversial Innocence of Muslims, and eventually resulting in a ban due to YouTube's noncompliance.

Bytes for All, a Pakistani non-profit organization, filed a constitutional challenge to the ban through their counsel Yasser Latif Hamdani in the Lahore High Court. This is an ongoing case and is commonly known as the YouTube case.

On December 11, 2013, it was announced by the Pakistan Telecommunication Authority that they had convinced Google's management to offer a local version of YouTube to Pakistan at YouTube.com.pk, as it would be easy for the local authorities to remove "objectionable" material from a local version compared to the global version of YouTube. However, it would only be offered after the Pakistani government fulfilled some undisclosed requirements.

On April 21, 2014, Pakistan's Senate Standing Committee on Human Rights approved a resolution to lift the ban on YouTube.

On May 6, 2014, the National Assembly unanimously adopted a non-binding resolution to lift the ban,. The ban was lifted due to a technical glitch on December 6, 2015, according to ISPs in Pakistan.

As of January 18, 2016, the ban has been officially lifted, as YouTube has launched a local version of the site for Pakistan. The Pakistani government was allowed to request that certain content on YouTube would be taken down.

On November 25, 2017, the NetBlocks internet measurement platform and Digital Rights Foundation collected evidence of nationwide blocking of YouTube alongside other social media services, imposed by the government in response to the violent Tehreek-e-Labaik protests. The technical investigation found that many, but not all, major Pakistani fixed-line and mobile service providers implemented the YouTube restriction which was lifted by the PTA the following day when protests abated after the resignation of Minister for Law and Justice Zahid Hamid.

=== South Korea ===
On March 9, 2021, at the request of the South Korean government, Google removed about 54,000 pieces of content. Additionally, government-critical videos that are difficult to delete were suppressed by making them recommended to the area that has nothing to do with the video.

=== Sudan ===
The Sudanese authorities blocked YouTube on April 21, 2010, following the 2010 presidential election, and also blocked YouTube's owner Google. The block was in response to a YouTube video appearing to show National Electoral Commission workers in official uniforms and a child in the Hamashkoreib region filling out voting strips and putting them into ballot boxes, with one of them expressing relief that the voting period had been extended for them to finish their work. Sudan had previously blocked YouTube temporarily in 2008 for unknown reasons.

On September 17, 2012, YouTube was banned again by National Telecommunication Corporation for not removing Innocence of Muslims, a controversial anti-Islamic film. However, the block was later lifted.

=== Syria ===
In multiple instances YouTube access was blocked in Syria by the Syrian government and blackouts caused by the Syrian civil war.

YouTube has been blocked since August 2007 after videos were circulated denouncing the crackdown on the Kurd minority. In February 2011 Syria lifted their block of YouTube and other social media services.

=== Tajikistan ===
In July 2012, the Tajik authorities blocked YouTube in response to uploaded videos showing protests against militant clashes. In the same year, the Tajik government blocked the website again, this time because of videos depicting the president Emomali Rakhmon which were deemed to be offensive to the government.

In 2013, Tajikistan blocked YouTube for a third time because of a video which depicts President Rakhmon dancing and singing out of tune at his son's wedding party in 2007.

On June 9, 2014, YouTube briefly became inaccessible for an unknown reason. Beg Zuhurov, chief of Tajikistan's State Communications Service, claimed that this was due to "technical problems".

On August 25, 2015, YouTube was once again blocked by certain ISPs following an order from the State Communications Service. The block was not lifted until mid-2017.

On May 23, 2019, after the President of Tajikistan criticized the internet for "bolstering terrorism", Tajik authorities extended the blockages of all Google resources, including YouTube. However, the ban was later lifted.

=== Thailand ===
In 2006, Thailand blocked access to YouTube for users with Thai IP addresses. Thai authorities identified 20 offensive videos and demanded that Google remove them before it would allow unblocking of all YouTube content.

During the week of March 8, 2007, YouTube was blocked in Thailand. Although no official explanation was given for the ban, many bloggers believed the reason for the blocking was a video of former Prime Minister Thaksin Shinawatra's speech on CNN. YouTube was unblocked on March 10, 2007.

On the night of April 3, 2007, YouTube was again blocked in Thailand. The government cited a video on the site that it called "insulting" to King Bhumibol Adulyadej. However, the Ministry of Information and Communication Technology said that it would unblock YouTube in a few days, after websites containing references to this video are blocked as opposed to the entire website. Communications Minister Sitthichai Pokai-udom said, "When they decide to withdraw the clip, we will withdraw the ban." Shortly after this incident the Internet technology blog Mashable was blocked from Thailand over the reporting of the YouTube clips in question. YouTube was unblocked on August 30, 2007, after YouTube reportedly agreed to block videos deemed offensive by Thai authorities.

On September 21, 2007, Thai authorities announced they were seeking a court order to block videos that had appeared on YouTube accusing Privy Council president Prem Tinsulanonda of attempting to manipulate the royal succession to make himself Thailand's king.

=== Tunisia ===
YouTube was blocked in Tunisia for several years before the 2011 Tunisian Revolution.

=== Turkey ===
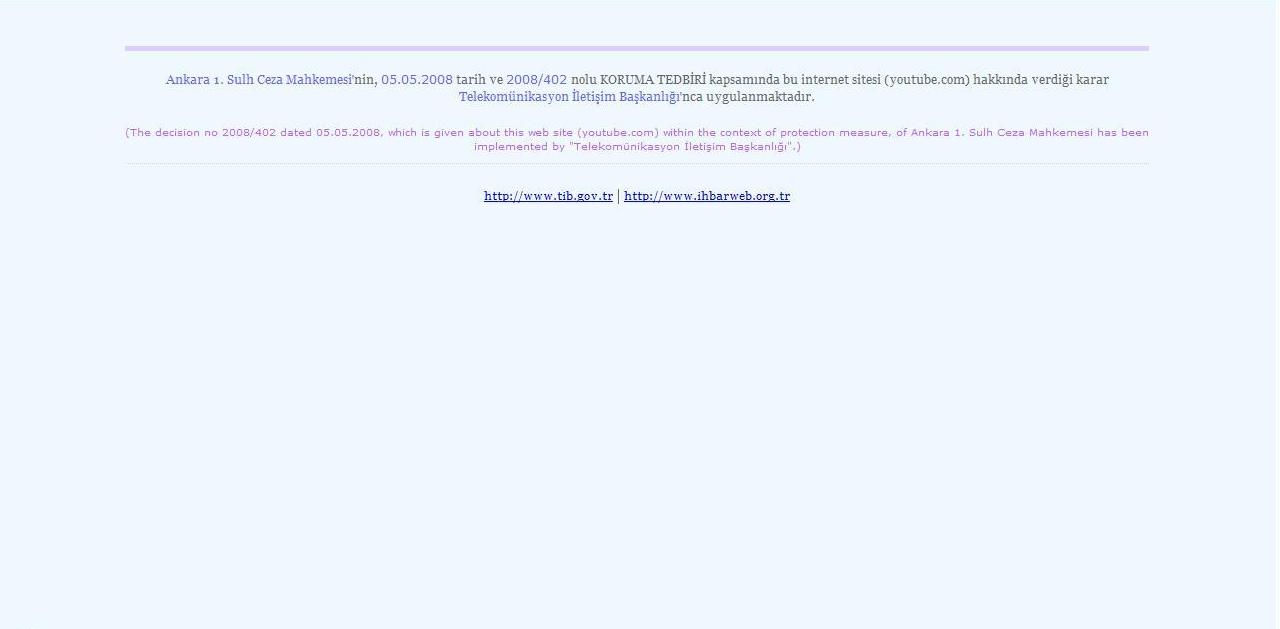
This error message was shown when attempting to access YouTube in Turkey between May 5, 2008, to October 30, 2010. It translates to: The decision of the Ankara 1st Criminal Court of Peace on this website (YouTube.com) within the scope of the PROTECTION MEASURE dated 05.05.2008 and numbered 2008/402 is implemented by the Directorate of Telecommunication Communication.

Turkish courts have ordered blocks on access to the YouTube website. This first occurred when Türk Telekom blocked the site in compliance with decision 2007/384 issued by the Istanbul 1st Criminal Court of Peace (Sulh Ceza Mahkeme) on March 6, 2007. The court decision was based on videos insulting Mustafa Kemal Atatürk in an escalation of what the Turkish media referred to as a "virtual war" of insults between Greek, Armenian, and Turkish YouTube members. YouTube was sued for "insulting Turkishness" and access to the site was suspended pending the removal of the video. YouTube lawyers sent proof of the video's removal to the Istanbul public prosecutor and access was restored on March 9, 2007. However, other videos similarly deemed insulting were repeatedly posted, and several staggered bans followed, issued by different courts:

- the Sivas 2nd Criminal Court of Peace on September 18, 2007, and again (by decision 2008/11) on January 16, 2008;
- the Ankara 12th Criminal Court of Peace on January 17, 2008 (decision 2008/55);
- the Ankara 1st Criminal Court of Peace on March 12, 2008 (decision 2008/251);
- the Ankara 11th Criminal Court of Peace on April 24, 2008 (decision 2008/468).
- the Ankara 5th Criminal Court of Peace on April 30, 2008 (decision 2008/599);
- again, the Ankara 1st Criminal Court of Peace on May 5, 2008 (decision 2008/402);
- again, the Ankara 11th Criminal Court of Peace on June 6, 2008 (decision 2008/624).
- again, based on "administrative measures" without court order following corruption scandal, relating several governmental officials including Prime Minister Erdoğan on March 27, 2014,

The block in accordance with court decision 2008/468 of the Ankara 11th Criminal Court of Peace issued on April 24, 2008, which cited that YouTube had not acquired a certificate of authorization in Turkey, was not implemented by Türk Telekom until May 5, 2008.

Although YouTube was officially banned in Turkey, the website was still accessible by modifying connection parameters to use alternative DNS servers, and it was the eighth most popular website in Turkey according to Alexa records. Responding to criticisms of the courts' bans, in November 2008 the Prime Minister Recep Tayyip Erdoğan stated "I do access the site. Go ahead and do the same."

In June 2010, President Abdullah Gül used his Twitter account to express disapproval of the country's blocking of YouTube, which also affected access from Turkey to many Google services. Gül said he had instructed officials to find legal ways of allowing access.

Turkey lifted the ban on October 30, 2010. In November 2010, a video of the Turkish politician Deniz Baykal caused the site to be blocked again briefly, and the site was threatened with a new shutdown if it did not remove the video.

On 27 March 2014, YouTube was blocked country-wide a day after a user uploaded a leaked security meeting that seemingly revealed Head of Turkish Intelligence Hakan Fidan, Turkish Foreign Minister Ahmet Davutoğlu, and others, plotting "false flag" operations in Syria. Erdoğan described the leak as "villainous"; Davutoğlu called it "a cyber attack against the Turkish Republic" and "a declaration of war against the Turkish state and our nation". YouTube was unblocked on June 3, 2014, after a court ruling.

On April 6, 2015, YouTube was again briefly blocked, alongside Facebook and Twitter, due to the widespread posting of footage of a prosecutor killed during a hostage crisis.

On December 23, 2016, YouTube again became briefly inaccessible in Turkey according to reports validated by internet monitoring group Turkey Blocks after footage that allegedly showed the immolation of Turkish soldiers by jihadists was shared on the site.

On July 1, 2020, in a statement made to his party members, Erdoğan announced that the government would introduce new measures and regulations to control or shut down social media platforms such as YouTube, Twitter and Netflix. Through these new measures, each company would be required to appoint an official representative in the country to respond to legal concerns. The decision comes after a number of Twitter users insulted his daughter Esra after she welcomed her fourth child.

=== United Arab Emirates ===
The UAE's Telecom Regulatory Authority (TRA) briefly blocked YouTube from August to October 2006 due to increasing concerns regarding the presence of adult content in the website. According to the TRA, the block was done due to YouTube not categorizing and separating adult pornographic content from normal content.

=== United States ===
On September 28, 2024, songs by several artists became unplayable on YouTube in the United States due to a legal dispute between YouTube and SESAC. For some affected artists, only certain songs were blocked, while others were available. Some artists who are not represented by SESAC, such as Beyoncé and Nicki Minaj, had some of their videos pulled from YouTube due to the song being a collaboration with a songwriter or musician that is represented by SESAC. On September 30, YouTube announced that they had reached a deal with SESAC to unblock the affected videos.

=== Uzbekistan ===
YouTube access in Uzbekistan was heavily censored for unknown reasons on October 9, 2018.

=== Venezuela ===
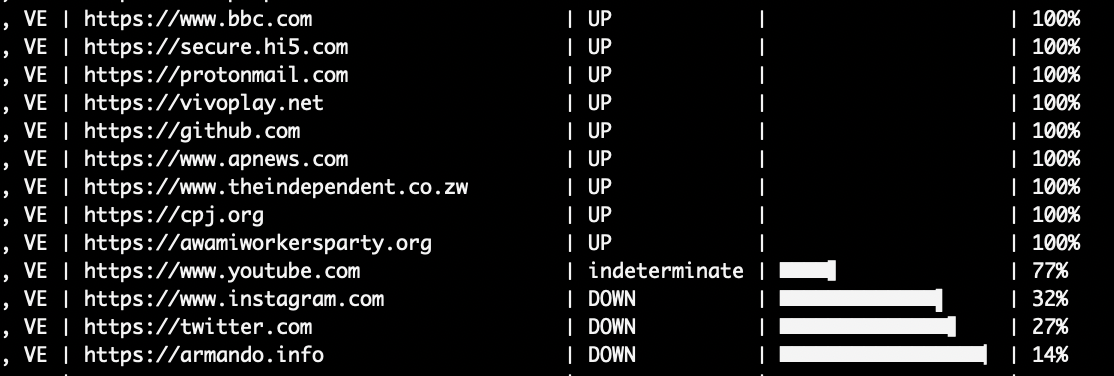
NetBlocks showing blocks of Instagram, Twitter and YouTube on January 21, 2019

During the Venezuelan presidential crisis of 2019, YouTube has been heavily censored regularly by Venezuela's state-owned internet service provider, CANTV. The blocking of YouTube and social media websites by the Venezuelan government were intended to suppress information relating to Juan Guaidó and the pro-opposition National Assembly. This mainly affects the access of streaming platforms like Periscope, YouTube, Bing, and other Google services.

On January 21, 2019, the day of a Bolivarian National Guard rebellion in the Cotiza neighborhood of Caracas, internet access to some social media websites, including YouTube was reported to be blocked for CANTV users. The Venezuelan government denied it had engaged in blocking.

During the Venezuela Aid Live concert on February 22, access to YouTube was blocked for CANTV users during the concert, alongside National Geographic and Antena 3 that were removed from cable and satellite TV for broadcasting the concert. Guaidó speech during the February 23 entry of the humanitarian aid, YouTube was blocked.

The longest block of YouTube to date started during a National Assembly session on March 6, lasting 20 hours.

The YouTube live stream of the press conference of US Secretary of State Mike Pompeo and Colombian President Iván Duque Márquez on April 15, 2019, was disrupted for CANTV users.

The YouTube restrictions returned with the return of the protests on November 16.

== See also ==
- Censorship of Wikipedia
- Censorship of Facebook
- Censorship of Twitter
- Censorship of TikTok
