= Censorship of Facebook =

Facebook is a social networking service that has been gradually replacing traditional media channels since 2010. Facebook has limited moderation of the content posted to its site. Because the site indiscriminately displays material publicly posted by users, Facebook can, in effect, threaten oppressive governments. Facebook can simultaneously propagate fake news, hate speech, and misinformation, thereby undermining the credibility of online platforms and social media.

The logo of Facebook

Many countries have banned or temporarily limited access to Facebook. Use of the website has also been restricted in various ways in other countries. As of 2024, the only countries to continually ban access to the social networking site are: China, Iran, North Korea, Myanmar, Russia, Turkmenistan and Uganda. However, since most North Korean residents have no access to the Internet, China, Russia, and Iran are the only countries where access to Facebook is actively restricted in a wholesale manner, although it is possible to access the site through onion services.

== Algorithmic censorship ==
Online censorship by Facebook of algorithmic methods raises concerns including the surveillance of all instant communications and the use of machine learning systems with the potential for errors and biases. Mark Zuckerberg, Facebook's CEO and majority shareholder, published a memo on censorship. "What should be the limits to what people can express?" he asked. "What content should be distributed and what should be blocked? Who should decide these policies and make enforcement decisions?"

== Censorship by country ==
Map showing the countries that are either currently blocking or have blocked Facebook in the past: Currently blocked Restricted Formerly blocked Not blocked

=== Australia ===
On 10 December 2025, due to a social media ban for children under sixteen that was announced by Anthony Albanese and came into effect on 28 November 2024, Facebook along with Instagram, YouTube, TikTok, X, and other social media were blocked for children under sixteen.

=== Austria ===
Like France and Germany, Austria has laws prohibiting Holocaust denial. This caused 78 Facebook posts to be banned from the country in 2013.

=== Bangladesh ===
Bangladesh (like Iran, China and North Korea) had banned Facebook before. The ban operated for about a month, precisely from November to December 2015. The Awami League-led government of Bangladesh announced a countrywide ban on Facebook and other social-network websites. Prime Minister Sheikh Hasina (in office from 2009) proposed the establishment of an Internet monitoring committee with the help of Bangladesh's intelligence services. Right-wing political parties and groups in Bangladesh protested against bloggers and others they had considered "blasphemous" at the time of the proposal. Extremists in the country had murdered eight secularists, including atheist blogger Ahmed Rajib Haider, who was fatally stabbed in February 2013. National riots over the country's war-crimes trials resulted in the deaths of 56 people between 19 January 2013 and 2 March 2013.

On 18 November 2015, the same Awami League government banned Facebook again on the eve of the final judgement of Bangladesh Jamaat-e-Islami leader Ali Ahsan Muhammad Mujahid and Bangladesh Nationalist Party leader Salahuddin Quader Chowdhury. Both the politicians and previous minister have been issued a death sentence by the War Criminals Tribunal and the review board of the Supreme Court of Bangladesh has finally given their judgement in favour of the previously given one.

The Bangladesh government lifted the ban on 20 December 2015.

=== China ===
In China, Facebook was blocked following the July 2009 Ürümqi riots because protestors with the East Turkestan independence movement were using Facebook as part of their communications network to organize attacks across the city; Facebook refused to release the protestor identities and information to the Chinese government. Some Chinese users also believed that Facebook would not succeed in China after Google China's problems in 2013. Renren (formerly Xiaonei) has many features similar to Facebook, and complies with PRC Government regulations regarding content filtering.

As of 20 August 2013, there have been reports of Facebook being partially unblocked in China. However, according to the "Blocked in China" website, Facebook is still blocked as of 7 December 2019. Facebook is not blocked in Hong Kong and Macau, which are special administrative regions operating under different systems. Facebook is currently working on a censorship project for China, where a third party would be allowed to regulate Facebook and control popular stories that come around. This would be a huge attempt by Facebook to get back into China.

On 6 July 2020, Facebook announced that the company would stop reviewing requests for Hong Kong users' data while evaluating the newly imposed Hong Kong national security law by the Chinese government.

=== Egypt ===
Facebook was blocked for a few days in Egypt during the 2011 Egyptian revolution.

=== France ===
Like Austria and Germany, France has laws prohibiting Holocaust denial. Because of this, 80 Facebook posts were blocked in 2013.

=== Germany ===
In July 2011, authorities in Germany began to discuss the prohibition of events organized on Facebook. This was motivated by numerous cases of overcrowding by people who were not originally invited. In one instance, 1,600 "guests" attended the 16th birthday party for a girl in Hamburg who accidentally posted the invitation for the event as public. After reports of overcrowding, more than a hundred police were deployed for crowd control. A police officer was injured and eleven participants were arrested for assault, property damage, and resistance to authorities. In another unexpectedly overcrowded event, 41 young people were arrested and at least 16 injured.

In 2016, Facebook revealed Germany had blocked 84 posts from its citizens. These posts contained themes of Holocaust denial, which is illegal there.

In 2015, during the European migrant crisis with large numbers of immigrants entering the country illegally, a broad discussion about the problems of mass immigration and government politics took place in social media. Early in 2016, a Bertelsmann company called "Arvato" was mandated to erase comments and contents from Facebook. In the summer of 2016, police in fourteen German states began coordinated raids on the residences of individuals who praised the Nazi regime or referred to refugees as "scum" in a private Facebook group. A law known as NetzDG went into effect starting in 2018 which mandates all websites in Germany, including Facebook, censor such illegal content. A spokesperson for Facebook announced the company's opposition to the law on the grounds that it would lead to overblocking.

=== Greece ===
In February 2021 Facebook deleted posts and events, imposed 30-day bans on prominent journalists and members of the general public, for posting in solidarity with the 63-year-old convict Dimitris Koufodinas who is on hunger strike since 8 January 2021. Koufodinas is serving a life sentence, after having been convicted as a member of the far-left Revolutionary Organization 17 November (17N), committing 11 murders in that time. He has been demanding to be returned to Korydallos prison for months with a long hunger strike against new repressive laws.

=== India ===
The first time Facebook shared how often it allows governments to censor their citizens' content, they stated that India had censored 4,765 posts in their country in the last six months of 2013. Facebook removed these posts in India under the government's claim of unlawful content.

India imposed a three-day ban on Facebook and other social media sites during the riots in Punjab, Haryana and Chandigarh after the conviction of Baba Ram Rahim Singh in 2017. Censorship on Facebook increased by 19% in 6 months in 2014; India led the list of content removal in 2014.

=== Indonesia ===
In 2019, the government (through the ministry of information) threatened to ban the social network.

In 2020, Facebook censored posts about "FPI". The escalation is in December 2020 when there are six FPI-affiliated civilians killed on purported attach by Police.

On 28 March 2026, Indonesia banned social media for children under the age of 16, becoming the first country in Southeast Asia to enforce a social media ban. Platforms such as YouTube, TikTok, X (formerly known as Twitter), Facebook, Instagram, Threads, Roblox and Bigo Live were the first to be banned; due to the country labelling them as high risk. Enforcement and account deactivation will be rolled out gradually, affecting all accounts that are reported to be under 16 and anyone who wants to access or create accounts must be verified by ID or facial scan.

=== Iran ===
After the 2009 Iranian presidential election, Facebook was banned because of fears that opposition movements were being organized on the website. However, after four years of the blocking of Facebook website, as of September 2013, the blocking of both Twitter and Facebook was thought to have been lifted without notice.

Iranians lost unrestricted access to Facebook and Twitter the next day, leaving many people wondering whether the opening was deliberate or the result of some technical glitch.

=== Israel ===
In September 2016, the Cabinet of Israel has said to have agreed with Facebook to remove content that is deemed as incitement to violence. This announcement came after top Facebook officials met with the Israeli government to determine which Facebook accounts should be deleted on the grounds that they constituted incitement to violence.

Critics of Israel's policies are not happy with this move as they claim it is being used as a way to silence outspoken Palestinian activists and journalists. The activists argue that when they post material meant to critique the occupation, Israel sees it as encouraging violence. Some believe that the Israeli government and Facebook have an "informal arrangement" for monitoring Facebook content. Jordana Cutler, who previously was the Chief of Staff at the Israel Embassy in Washington DC and a former adviser to Prime Minister Benjamin Netanyahu is Facebook's head of policy in Israel. She claimed that Facebook is merely following suggestions. "We receive requests from the government but are not committed to them," Cutler said.

=== Nauru ===
In 2015, Nauru permanently blocked sites set up for "abusive content" such as child pornography and would temporarily block some sites like Facebook. Despite controversy surrounding the ban, President Baron Waqa defended it. In 2018, the ban on Facebook in Nauru was lifted.

=== North Korea ===
In April 2016, North Korea started blocking Facebook, "a move underscoring its concern with the spread of online information," according to the Associated Press. Anyone who tries to access it without special permission from the North Korean government will be subject to punishment.

=== Mauritius ===
The Information and Communication Technologies Authority (ICTA) of Mauritius, ordered internet service providers of the country to ban Facebook effective immediately, on 8 November 2007 because of a fake profile page of the Prime Minister. Access to Facebook was restored the next day.

=== Morocco ===
On 5 February 2008, Fouad Mourtada, a citizen of Morocco, was arrested for 43 days due to the alleged creation of a faked Facebook profile of Prince Moulay Rachid of Morocco.

=== Myanmar ===
On 4 February 2021, access to Facebook, WhatsApp, and Instagram were restricted on multiple internet providers in Myanmar following the 2021 Myanmar coup d'état. Facebook's usual attempts of not following and challenging the local laws and government led to the current censorship block. The censorship might remain forever and be replaced by similar social media which will abide by the local laws.

=== Pakistan ===
On 19 May 2010, the Lahore High Court ordered Facebook to be blocked. Facebook was blocked until 31 May 2010 after a competition page encouraged users to post drawings of Muhammad. The controversial page named "Draw Mohammad Day" had been created by a Facebook user in response to American cartoonist Molly Noris's protest to the decision of US television channel, Comedy Central to cancel an episode of the popular show South Park over its depiction of Muhammad. Noris had however disavowed having declared 20 May "Draw Muhammad Day" and had condemned the effort and issued an apology. The ban, implemented by the Pakistan Telecommunication Authority, also resulted in a ban on YouTube and restricted access to other websites, including Wikipedia.

On 25 November 2017, the NetBlocks internet shutdown observatory and Digital Rights Foundation collected evidence of nationwide blocking of Facebook alongside other social media services, imposed by the government in response to the violent Tehreek-e-Labaik protests. The technical investigation found that all major Pakistani fixed-line and mobile service providers were affected by the restrictions, which were lifted by the PTA the next day when protests abated following the resignation of Minister for Law and Justice Zahid Hamid. Other websites including Twitter, YouTube and Dailymotion were also reportedly blocked by order of the PTA.

=== Papua New Guinea ===
Between May and June 2018, Facebook was banned for a month due to users posting misinformation and pornography.

=== Russia ===
In 2014, Russia demanded that all links on Facebook be blocked that supported Russian opposition Alexei A. Navalny. Facebook users were blocked from any protest supporting Alexei. This included about ten million Facebook users.

The Russian invasion of Ukraine culminated in Russian-state media being banned from monetizing content on the Facebook platform. Russia therefore decided to impose access restriction on Facebook and Twitter.

On 27 February 2022, Russia began restricting access to Facebook during the invasion of Ukraine by limiting access to the platform's content delivery network. On 4 March 2022, Internet rights monitor NetBlocks reported that the restriction of Facebook had become "near-total." Regulatory agency Roskomnadzor announced that the restrictions had been imposed to curtail information on Facebook and Twitter which did not align with the government of Russia's positions.

Facebook along with Instagram are labelled as extremist by Russian government, making it illegal to use with VPN if the law was passed on 17 July 2025 to criminalise searching and accessing to extremist materials even with VPN, with a fines from 3000 to 5000 rubles (€30 to €50) by the 1 September 2025.

=== Solomon Islands ===
In November 2020, Solomon Islands' Cabinet planned to block access to Facebook in the country in response to a lack of national legislation on internet usage and cybercrime. The motion to block it was started by the prime minister Manasseh Sogavare and communication and civil aviation minister Peter Agovaka. In January 2021, the proposed ban did not go ahead.

=== Sri Lanka ===
In March 2018, Facebook was blocked for 3 days in Sri Lanka due to racial hate speeches being rumored around the country via the social media network, causing many riots in the country by extremist groups. However this decision was not permanent.

On 21 April 2019, Facebook was blocked along with other social media sites until 30 April 2019 in Sri Lanka to prevent false information about Easter Sunday bombings spreading around the country via social media.

On 5 May 2019, the Sri Lankan government reimposed a ban on social media platforms in an effort to stop the spread of rumours after violence erupted between groups of civilians in Negombo, north of the capital and site of one of the Easter Sunday bombings. The ban was lifted on 6 May 2019.

On 13 May 2019, the Sri Lankan government temporarily banned social media including Facebook. This measure has been taken owing to the false propaganda carried out on social media and the unrest which had occurred in several areas. The ban was lifted on 17 May 2019.

=== Sudan ===
In December 2018, the Sudanese government blocked Facebook, along with other social media sites, which were being used by anti-government protesters to organize protests against President Omar al-Bashir. The restrictions were lifted 68 days later following the introduction of emergency measures outlawing public demonstrations.

=== Syria ===
In November 2007, the Syrian government blocked access to Facebook in Syria. The government claimed that the website promoted attacks on authorities. The government also feared Israeli infiltration of Syrian social networks on Facebook. Facebook was also used by Syrian citizens to criticize the government of Syria, as public criticism of the Syrian government used to be punishable by imprisonment. In February 2011, Facebook was unblocked from all ISPs and the website remains accessible.

=== Tajikistan ===
In November 2012, Tajikistan temporarily blocked access to Facebook in response to comments posted online, spreading "mud and slander" about President Emomalii Rahmon and various other officials.

=== Thailand ===
In 2017, Thailand asked Facebook to remove 309 posted items that were said to be illegal by standards of Thailand. However, Facebook only deleted 178 of the items, leaving 131 still on Facebook. Thai authorities stated if they found any illegal content in the remaining 131 posts they would ban all 14.8 million users from Facebook, instead of taking legal action. All posts ended up being removed from Facebook, preventing the shutdown of Facebook in Thailand.

On 24 August 2020, after being pressured by Thai government, Facebook blocked access in Thailand to "Royalist Marketplace", a private Monarchy discussion group created by Pavin Chachavalpongpun that has over one million members. In response, Pavin created a new group immediately and gained more than 500,000 members in one day. A Facebook spokesperson stated, "Requests like this are severe, contravene international human rights law, and have a chilling effect on people's ability to express themselves... We work to protect and defend the rights of all internet users and are preparing to legally challenge this request."

=== Tunisia ===
Facebook was a major part of the political uprisings of the 'Arab Spring' in 2011.

=== Turkey ===
After photos of Mehmet Selim Kiraz being held at gun point by two terrorists began circulation on social media on 6 April 2015, the Turkish government banned Facebook, Twitter, YouTube, and 166 other websites in the country for hours. The government does not tolerate "anti-government propaganda," and their laws are becoming increasingly more strict. In the 2015 Press Freedom Index from Reporters Without Borders, Turkey ranked 149 of 180 countries. Facebook was blocked on 27 February 2020 at 23:30, along with several other social media sites. It happened the day that the military crisis in Idlib escalated.

=== Turkmenistan ===
Turkmenistan banned Facebook in 2018.

=== Uganda ===
Since 2021 elections, Facebook has been blocked in the country. The Uganda government blocked Facebook after the social media giant deleted hundreds of accounts of National Resistance Movement supporters it suspected to be fake during the general election last year. Initially, the government blocked social media and then the internet entirely prior to the general elections. Later on, internet was reinstated in the nation and some social media apps shortly after. However, Facebook remained blocked in the country.

"We have released elements of social media — Twitter, Instagram, Whatsapp — because we think to a less extent, those are not as lethal as Facebook," Opondo said. "So, we shall examine going forward, their posture on these other social media platforms that have been released. And that will inform how soon Facebook is restored."

Until today, it is unclear if the government will ever reinstate Facebook since the last addresses indicated that Facebook had not complied to the government requests.

=== United Kingdom ===
In the United Kingdom on 28 April 2011, the day before the wedding of Prince William and Catherine Middleton, a number of politically motivated Facebook groups and pages were removed or suspended from the website as part of a nationwide crackdown on political activity. The groups and pages were mostly concerned with opposition to government spending cuts, and many were used to organize demonstrations in a continuation of the 2010 United Kingdom student protests. The censorship of the pages coincided with a series of pre-emptive arrests of known activists. Amongst the arrestees were a communist and socialist, and a few members of a street theater group planning an effigy beheading performance in opposition to the monarchy.

A Facebook spokesperson said the pages were disabled as part of a routine sweep because they were created with fake personal profiles, a violation of the company's term of service. In this case a number of the Facebook personal profile pages represented causes, rather than real people. Facebook "offered to help convert the profiles to pages that are designed to represent companies, groups or causes." The spokesperson went on to say that "the Met Police did not ask Facebook to take down this content."

In March 2018, far-right Britain First was removed by Facebook. The pages of the leaders of the party were also taken down following their arrest and incarceration.

=== Vietnam ===
Facebook was blocked in Vietnam for two weeks in May 2016 due to protest of dissidents.

Vietnam Facebook users total about 52 million and is a vital tool for their day to day use. However, the government is not accountable to the people which causes abuse of censorship in Vietnam. In 2018, the government created a huge military unit to block posts containing "wrong views" online. To appease the government, Facebook removed 160 "toxic" accounts for speech against the Communist Party in 2017.

== Bans or former bans by country ==
| Country | Start of ban | End of ban | Notes |
|---|---|---|---|
| Bangladesh | 2015 | 2015 | Banned for one month and two days. |
| China | 2009 | | Still banned, although not blocked in Hong Kong and Macau. |
| India | 2017 | 2017 | Banned for three days. |
| Iran | 2009, 2013 | 2013 | Initially banned due to the 2009 Iranian presidential election. |
| Mauritius | 2007 | 2007 | Banned for one day. |
| Myanmar | 2021 | | Banned due to the 2021 Myanmar coup d'état. Still banned. |
| Nauru | 2015 | 2018 | |
| Nepal | 2025 | 2025 | Banned for 5 days. |
| North Korea | 2016 | | Viewing Facebook has been a crime in North Korea since 2016 and is subject to punishment. Still banned. |
| Pakistan | 2010, 2017 | 2010, 2017 | Banned in 2010 for 12 days. Banned in 2017 for one day. |
| Papua New Guinea | 2018 | 2018 | Banned for a month due to users posting misinformation and pornography. |
| Russia | 2022 | | Banned due to the Russo-Ukrainian War. Still banned. |
| Sri Lanka | 2018, 2019 | 2018, 2019 | Facebook has been banned four times in Sri Lanka. The first time was for three days in 2018, the second time for nine days in 2018, the third time for one day in 2019 and the fourth time for four days in 2019. |
| Syria | 2008 | 2011 | |
| Tajikistan | 2012 | 2012 | |
| Thailand | 2023 | 2023 | Banned for a month due to scam commercial for investment by a court order. |
| Turkey | 2020 | 2020 | |
| Turkmenistan | 2018 | | Turkmenistan blocks all outside social media platforms. Still banned. |
| Uganda | 2021 | | Banned due to the 2021 Ugandan general election. Still banned. |
| Vietnam | 2016 | 2016 | Banned for two weeks. |

== See also ==
- Censorship by country
- Censorship of Google
- Censorship of Twitter
- Censorship of Wikipedia
- Censorship of YouTube
- Criticism of Facebook
- Internet censorship by country
