= List of CISAC members =

This is a list of International Confederation of Societies of Authors and Composers (French: Confédération Internationale des Sociétés d´Auteurs et Compositeurs) or CISAC members.

As of September 2011, CISAC counts among its members 232 authors' societies in 121 countries.

== Africa ==
Algeria

ONDA

Angola

UNAC-SA

Benin

BUBEDRA

Botswana

COSBOTS

Burkina Faso

BBDA

Cabo Verde

SCM-COOPERATIVA

Congo

BCDA

Côte d'Ivoire

BURIDA

Ghana

GHAMRO Mali Miliki Institute

Guinea

BGDA

Kenya

MCSK

Lesotha

LESCOSAA

Madagascar

OMDA

Malawi

COSOMA

Mali

BUMDA

Mauritius

MASA

Morocco

BMDA

Mozambique

BMDAV

Namibia

NASCAM

Nigeria

AVRS

Senegal

SODAV

South Africa

Southern African Music Rights Organisation (SAMRO), CAPASSO

Tanzania

COSOTA

Uganda

Uganda Performing Right Society (UPRS)

Zimbabwe

ZIMURA

== America ==
Argentina

ARGENTORES, DAC, SADAIC

Barbados

COSCAP

Bolivia

SOBODAYCOM

Brazil

ABRAMUS, ADDAF, AMAR, ASSIM, AUTVIS, DCBA, GEDAR, SBACEM, SICAM, SOCINPRO, UBC

Canada

CARCC, CSCS, DRCC, SARTEC, SOCAN, SPACQ-AE

Chile

ATN, CREAIMAGEN, DYGA Chile, SCD

Colombia

DASC, REDES SGC, SAYCO

Costa Rica

ACAM

Cuba

ACDAM

Dominican Republic

SGACEDOM

Ecuador

SAYCE

El Salvador

SACIM EGC

Guatemala

AEI-GUATEMALA

Honduras

AACIMH

Jamaica

JACAP

Mexico

DIRECTORES, SACM, SOMAAP

Panama

SPAC

Paraguay

APA

Peru

APDAYC, APSAV

Saint Lucia

ECCO

Suriname

SASUR

Trinidad and Tobago

ACCS, COTT

United States

AMRA, ARS, ASCAP, ASCRL, Directors Guild of America (DGA), The MLC

Uruguay

AGADU

Venezuela

SACVEN

== Asia & Oceania ==
Australia

AMCOS (Associate), APRA (Member), ASDACS, AWGACS, Copyright Agency

China

MCSC

Hong Kong

CASH

India

IPRS, SRAI

Indonesia

WAMI

Japan

APG-Japan, DGJ, JASRAC, JASPAR

Macau

MACA

Malaysia

MACP

Nepal

CPSN, MRCSN

New Zealand

DEGANX, RRA

Philippines

FILSCAP

Republic of Korea

DGK, KOLAA, KOMCA, KOSCAP, KTRWA, SACK

Singapore

COMPASS

Taiwan, Chinese Taipei

MÜST

Thailand

MCT

United Arab Emirates

EMRA

Vietnam

VCPMC

== Europe ==
Albania

ALBAUTOR

Andorra

SDADV

Armenia

ARMAUTHOR NGO, ArmCinemaAuthor

Austria

AKM, BILDRECHT LITERAR-MECHANA, VDFS

Azerbaijan

AzDG

Belarus

NCIP

Belgium

EVA, GESAC, IMPF, SAA, SABAM, SOFAM

Bosnia and Herzegovina

AMUS

Bulgaria

FILMAUTOR, MUSICAUTOR

Croatia

DHFA, HDS-ZAMP

Czechia

DILIA, GESTOR, OZA, OOA-S, OSA

Denmark

KODA, NCB, VISDA

Estonia

EAU

Finland

KOPIOSTO, KUVASTO, SANASTO, TEOSTO

France

ADAGP, AVTE, SACD, SACEM, SACENC, SAID, SCAM

Germany

GEMA, VG BILD-KUNST, VG WORT

Greece

ATHINA-SADA, Autodia, EDEM, ISOCRATIS, OSDEETE

Hungary

ARTISJUS, FILMJUS, HUNGART

Iceland

MYNDSTEF, STEF, IMRO

Israel

ACUM, TALI

Italy

MRIGHTS, SIAE

Kazakhstan

KazAK

Latvia

AKKA-LAA

Lithuania

LATGA

Luxembourg

SACEMLUXEMBOURG

Moldova

ANCO

Montenegro

PAM CG

Netherlands

BUMA, LIRA, PICTORIGHT, STEMRA, VEVAM

North Macdeonia

ZAMP Macedonia

Norway

BONO, TONO

Poland

ZAiKS, ZAPA

Portugal

SPA

Republic of Kosovo

VAPIC

Romania

DACIN, SAR, UCMR-ADA, VISARTA

Russian Federation

CRSEA, RAO

Serbia

Asociajacija Autora, OFA, SOKOJ

Slovakia

LITA, SOZA

Slovenia

AIPA, SAZAS, ZAMP Association of Slovenia

Spain

DAMA, EKKI, SEDA, SGAE, VEGAP

Sweden

Bildupphovsrätt, COPYSWEDE, STIM

Switzerland

PROLITTERIS, SSA, SUISA, SUISSIMAGE

Turkey

MESAM, MSG, SEF

Ukraine

UACRR

United Kingdom

ACS, ALCS, Design and Artists Copyright Society (DACS), Directors_UK, IAF, Performing Right Society (PRS FOR MUSIC)

Uzbekistan

SIIP
