= NetBlocks =

Watchdog organization

- Formation: 2017; 9 years ago
- Founder: Alp Toker
- Type: Social business
- Headquarters: London, United Kingdom
- Methods: Technology journalism
- Website: netblocks.org

NetBlocks is a watchdog organization that monitors cybersecurity and the governance of the Internet. The service was launched in 2017 to monitor Internet freedom.

== Activities ==
=== Projects ===
NetBlocks publishes original reporting on Internet governance and sustainable energy, providing tools to the public to observe possible Internet restrictions and to estimate the economic consequences of network disruptions. NetBlocks has established a high level of trust in communities around the world, facilitating the spread of information during emergencies and Internet censorship events, according to peer-reviewed research published in the scientific journal Nature.

=== Events ===
On 25 November 2017, NetBlocks and the Digital Rights Foundation provided information about the nationwide censorship of Facebook, Twitter, YouTube and other social media services by the Pakistani government following the Tehreek-e-Labaik protests.

During the 2018–2019 Sudanese protests, NetBlocks stated that the Sudanese government maintains "an extensive Internet censorship regime" following the censorship of social media websites in the country. Following the 2019 Gabonese coup d'état attempt, NetBlocks monitored censorship in the country. The cost of the three-day Internet shutdown following the Zimbabwean fuel protests was also calculated to cost Zimbabwe an estimated $17 million.

The block of Wikipedia in Venezuela and other censorship incidents during the Venezuelan presidential crisis were also monitored by NetBlocks, with several international media outlets covering the situation with NetBlocks' work.

In July 2020, as the Somalian Parliament passed a motion of no confidence in Prime Minister Hassan Ali Khaire, NetBlocks reported that Internet access had been disrupted impeding media coverage of political and public reactions to events on the ground, presenting evidence contradicting network operator Hormuud Telecom's claim that the outage was due to "windy conditions."

From February 2022, NetBlocks set up a reporting initiative providing extensive coverage on the Russian invasion of Ukraine, documenting Russian efforts to disable communications at nuclear sites and in conflict zones.

== Reception ==
Visiting NetBlocks' website used to trigger monitoring checks against websites to see if they were blocked for that visitor. However, these checks were done without the user's consent. A researcher, Collin Anderson, argued that this could potentially present a risk to users. NetBlocks said it removed the checks in 2020 because the data "just wasn't that good," Wired reported.

Anderson set up a website criticizing NetBlocks at the domain "netblocks.fyi". In September 2020, NetBlocks filed a complaint against Anderson with the World Intellectual Property Organization. The mailing list OTF-Talk reacted negatively to the response, and afterwards subscribers demanded NetBlocks "release its tools as open source software, make its methodologies open to audit, and publish its measurement data so it could be scrutinised". NetBlocks won the complaint in November 2020 and took over the domain. Anderson subsequently moved the site to netblocked.org.
