= Google and censorship =

Google and censorship may refer to:

- Censorship by Google, willful censorship by Google of content within its services and websites
- Censorship of Google: blocking or filtering of Google services or websites by outside entities, notably in the policies of Internet censorship in the People's Republic of China
- Google's own censorship of its search results as the result of legal action by third parties, most notably the European Union's "right to be forgotten"

See also Internet censorship and surveillance by country.
