= Stim =

Stim may refer to:

- STIM (Svenska Tonsättares Internationella Musikbyrå), Swedish Performing Rights Society
- Stimming, repetitive self-stimulating behavior, often observed in autistic people

== See also ==
- Stimulus (physiology), a detectable change in the internal or external environment
- Stimulation, the action of various agents (stimuli) on muscles, nerves, or a sensory end organ
- Stimulant, a drug or other substance that temporarily increases alertness and wakefulness
