= Censorship of Google =

Censorship of Google refers to the blocking or filtering of Google services by outside entities (typically governments), preventing users from accessing Google's search engine or related services such as YouTube, Gmail, Google Maps, and others. This is distinct from censorship by Google (Google's own removal or filtering of content due to legal demands or company policies), and this article deals only with restrictions imposed on Google by external authorities. (Censorship of YouTube is mentioned here but covered in more detail in the relevant article).

Driven by political and religious considerations, Google's services have been subject to censorship in various countries around the world, ranging from temporary blocks of specific services to nationwide bans of all Google products. Notably, the most extensive censorship occurs under the "Great Firewall" in China, but a number of other countries – including Iran, North Korea, Turkmenistan, Russia, and others – have at times blocked Google or its subsidiaries for political, religious, or security reasons. These restrictions have evolved over time, with some being lifted or eased and others becoming permanent, in line with each government's internet control policies.

Censorship of Google (in particular, of its YouTube service) is observed predominantly in authoritarian and semi-authoritarian countries that seek to control citizens' access to information. The methods range from total blocking of Google (as seen in China and North Korea) to temporary or service-specific bans (as seen in countries like Iran and Turkey) to regulatory pressure and filtering (as in Russia and many countries).

In 2010, Google claimed to suffer various levels of censorship in 25 countries.

== Censorship of Google by country ==
=== China ===
In the People's Republic of China, Google's services have faced widespread censorship and blocking as part of the country's strict internet control (the "Great Firewall"). Google services were initially available in China, just like in the rest of the world. Google subsequently launched a mainland Chinese search engine (Google.cn) that complied with government censorship rules by filtering search results. However, this approach changed after a series of disputes. In January 2010 Google announced it would no longer censor search results in China – ending "four years" of self-censorship – even if that meant it could not continue operations. This decision was prompted by the company's growing concerns over government censorship and a major hacking attack (believed to have originated in China) targeting Google and other companies. In March 2010 Google followed through on its stance: it shut down its Google.cn search service and began redirecting Chinese users to Google's uncensored Hong Kong site (google.com.hk). China's authorities condemned Google's exit as a violation of its "written promise" to abide by local laws. After Google's move to Hong Kong, the Chinese government's filtering system still intervened – searches from mainland China for sensitive topics on the Hong Kong site would often not return results, as the connection would be reset by the Great Firewall.

Even before Google's 2010 departure, certain Google services had already been blocked in China. Google's video-sharing platform YouTube was first blocked in China in March 2009 and has remained inaccessible since. After Google's shift of search to Hong Kong, other services, like Gmail, became targets of China's censors as well. In June 2014, on the eve of the 25th anniversary of the Tiananmen Square crackdown, virtually all remaining access to Google services was cut off; traffic data showed that Google's main search, Gmail, and other products became inaccessible to most Chinese users. At that time, the outage was initially believed to possibly be temporary, but it persisted, indicating a long-term de facto ban. Since 2014, Google's suite of services has been effectively blocked entirely in mainland China without use of circumvention (such as VPNs). Chinese internet users are instead directed to domestic alternatives favored by authorities – for instance, the government promotes Baidu as the primary search engine. As of the mid-2020s, China's censorship regime continues to completely block Google Search, Gmail, YouTube and most other Google services.

=== Iran ===
The Islamic Republic of Iran also engages in extensive censorship of Google services. YouTube has been blocked in Iran since June 2009 – a ban instituted after the platform was used to share footage of protests and the government's crackdown following the disputed 2009 presidential election. In subsequent years, Iranian authorities have repeatedly targeted Google's other products. In September 2012, during a wave of anger over the U.S.-made "Innocence of Muslims" film considered blasphemous, Iran announced it was blocking access to Google's search engine and Gmail nationwide. The government claimed the ban was enacted "at the Iranian people's request" due to public complaints about the offensive video, which was hosted on YouTube (Iran's YouTube ban was already in place). The blocking of Gmail coincided with the launch of Iran's own national email service and a closed domestic internet network, leading observers to suggest the authorities were using the crisis as an opportunity to push citizens onto the Chinese-inspired, state-run "National Internet" (sometimes called in Iran the "Halal Internet"), with services such as censored search engine Parsijoo. Google Search and Gmail were reportedly unblocked in Iran some time after, once the controversy subsided, but YouTube has remained firmly banned.

Iran's censorship of Google has continued in various forms. In recent years, amid protests and unrest (for example, the 2022 protests), Iran's government has often tightened internet restrictions, which included blocking Google's app store (Google Play) and other Google services to restrict communication. Notably, from late 2022 Iran blocked Google Play and some messaging apps as part of a broader crackdown, but lifted the ban on Google Play (and WhatsApp) in 2024 after about two and a half years.

=== Russia ===
In the Russian Federation, Google's services have mostly remained accessible until recently, but the government has exerted pressure through legal and technical means, and has targeted certain Google services during specific confrontations. Unlike China or Iran, Russia has not instituted a blanket nationwide ban on Google Search; Russian users can generally reach Google. However, the state has employed selective censorship and regulatory demands on Google. One aspect has been content filtering requirements: under laws introduced since 2012, Russia requires search engines like Google to remove links to websites that are banned in Russia (for extremism, illegal information, etc.), and to comply with data storage rules. Google has faced fines in Russia for failing to fully purge banned content from its search results.

Another aspect is targeted blocking of specific Google services in response to conflicts. In April 2018, during the Russian government's attempt to shut down the encrypted messaging app Telegram (which was using cloud services to circumvent blocking), authorities ended up blocking millions of IP addresses, including many belonging to Google. Roskomnadzor (the state communications regulator) ordered ISPs to block large ranges of Amazon Web Services and Google Cloud Platform addresses that Telegram was suspected of using. This crude approach caused major collateral damage: Google services such as YouTube, Gmail, Google Drive, Google Play and others became intermittently inaccessible or unstable in Russia as a result. That ban was lifted in 2020.

In September 2021, Roskomnadzor requested that companies abandon Google and similar foreign DNS services. That year Russian ISPs restricted access to Google Docs service.

Another notable incident occurred in March 2022, after Russia's invasion of Ukraine. Amidst wartime censorship, Russia blocked Google News – the Google News aggregator service – on the grounds that it was spreading "false information" about Russia's military actions in Ukraine. This move came as part of a broader tightening of information control in Russia during the conflict, which also saw Twitter, Facebook, and Instagram blocked. Google News was subsequently unblocked and blocked again in 2023. Additionally, in some parts of Ukraine occupied by Russian forces, reports emerged that Russian authorities blocked Google Search entirely, labeling it as a source of "misinformation". Russia has also fined YouTube for not removing a number of videos related the war that the Russian government demanded be removed.

Google has complied, however, with a number of requests to remove apps from its Google Play store (generally related to VPN services, but also some related to governments transparency, promoted by the Russian opposition). Google has also complied with some, but not all, requests to remove various sites from its search result.

=== North Korea ===
A few highly isolated countries impose near-total bans on Google due to their extreme control over the internet. North Korea is the best known, extreme example: ordinary North Korean citizens have no access to the global internet at all, and thus cannot reach Google services. The country maintains a sealed domestic intranet (called Kwangmyong) for limited use by its population, completely separate from the World Wide Web. Only a small number of elite users and foreign visitors in North Korea can go online (under strict supervision), and even for them, websites like Google are officially off-limits.

=== Syria ===
Syria has experienced severe internet curbs amid its civil war. Notably, some Google services have been unavailable in Syria.

=== Tajikistan ===
The Central Asian state of Tajikistan has occasionally blocked Google and YouTube for short periods of time, usually in response to political content; usually the authorities deny involvement, calling such outages "technical problems," but domestic ISPs have confirmed receiving government instructions to block sites. For example, in June 2014, Tajikistan users found Google Search, Gmail, and YouTube inaccessible after videos critical of President Emomali Rahmon were posted online.

=== Turkey ===
Turkey has a history of periodically censoring Google services, especially YouTube, often due to content deemed offensive to the state or its founding figures. The most prominent case was Turkey's long-running ban on YouTube from 2000 until 2010. Turkish courts blocked access to YouTube in May 2008 after some user-uploaded videos insulted the founder of modern Turkey, Mustafa Kemal Atatürk (such insults are illegal under Turkish law). In 2010 Turkish authorities briefly escalated, extended the blocking to include some Google webpages and IP addresses that were used by YouTube. This broad action accidentally knocked out many other Google services as well, since the IP addresses hosting YouTube also hosted Google products like Google Docs, Google Translate, Google Analytics, and more. The outage of Google services caused public outcry and even Turkey's President at the time, Abdullah Gül, spoke out against the breadth of the ban.

Turkey again blocked YouTube (and Twitter) temporarily in March 2014, when leaked audio recordings of government officials were circulated online during a political scandal and ahead of elections. The Turkish government ordered YouTube blocked for national security reasons. That ban lasted about two months until Turkey's Constitutional Court ruled in June 2014 that the YouTube ban violated freedom of expression, leading to its restoration shortly afterward.

There have been several other, short lived incidents of YouTube block in Turkey over the years.

In a later incident, in October 2016, Turkish authorities blocked Google Drive and other cloud storage services (Dropbox, OneDrive) for several days. This move was aimed at stopping the spread of hacked emails from a Turkish minister that were being shared publicly.

=== Turkmenistan ===
Internet censorship in Turkmenistan was classified as pervasive in the political area and as selective in the social, conflict/security and internet tools areas by the OpenNet Initiative in December 2010. Turkmenistan was listed as an internet enemy by Reporters Without Borders in 2011.

Access to Google Cloud Storage services was restricted in Turkmenistan in 2019 as part of the government attempt to deal with attempts to bypass its online censorship. Similarly that year, access to Google Play was blocked, as part of the Turkmenistan government to make it difficult for its citizens to install VPN applications. Access to other google services, such as Gmail and YouTube is difficult in country.

== See also ==
- Internet censorship and surveillance by country
- Restrictions on geographic data in South Korea
