= KODA (Denmark) =

Danish performance rights organisation

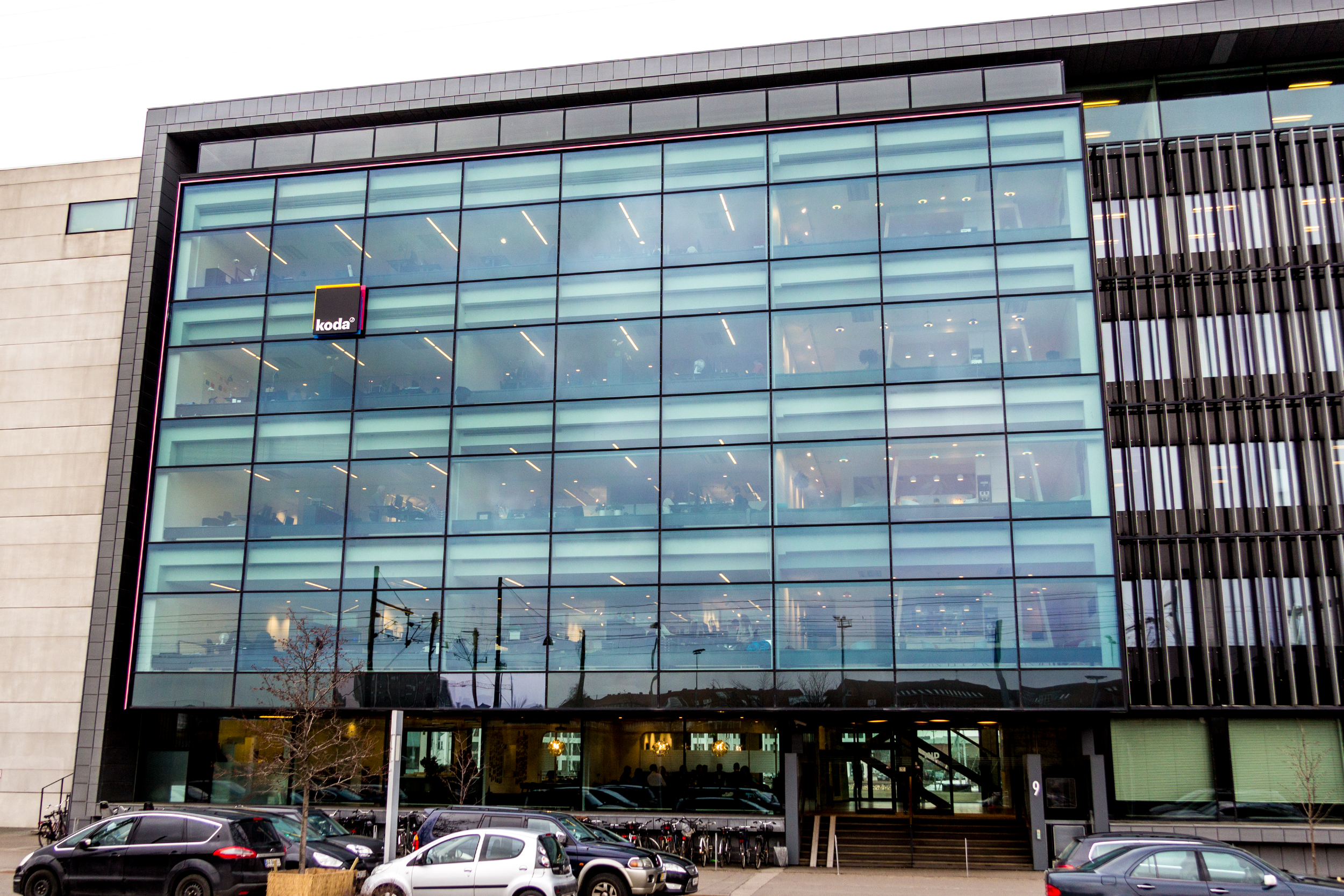
KODA headquarters.

KODA is the collecting society for songwriters, composers and music publishers of Denmark.

Its role is to act as an agent for its members in order to collect license fees whenever their musical works are performed in public, broadcast or transmitted, and to pay out performing royalties.

In 1935, an agreement reached with and a concession were given by the Danish Ministry of Culture in which the public performance rights were established.

In April 2020, YouTube's licensing deal with KODA expired. On July 30, 2020, YouTube threatened to block music videos containing content from KODA over royalty fees. KODA claimed that YouTube wanted to reduce royalty payments by 70 percent. Polaris Nordic, an alliance of societies consisting of KODA, TONO (Norway), and Teosto (Finland), has been negotiating with YouTube for a new Scandinavia-wide licensing agreement. On October 1, 2020, YouTube and Polaris reached a new agreement, bringing music by Danish songwriters back onto YouTube.

== See also ==
- List of CISAC members
- CISAC
- List of copyright collection societies
