= Azmina Dhrodia =

Canadian online safety expert (born 1985)

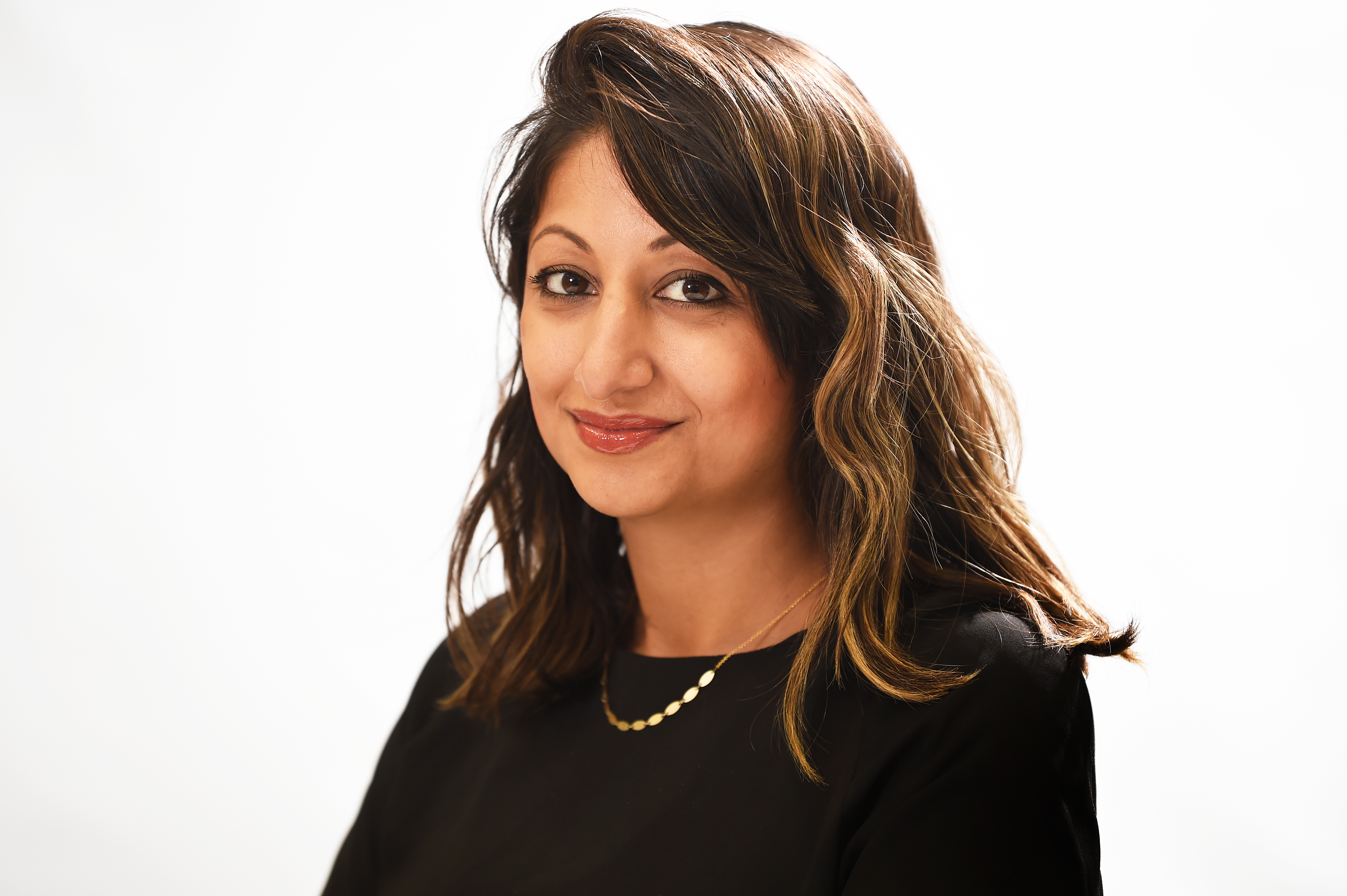
- Born: 1985 (age 40–41)
- Occupations: Technology Policy and Human Rights Expert

Azmina Dhrodia (born 1985) is a Canadian online safety and public policy expert based in London. Her work focuses on how technology and design decisions impact the safety and rights of women and marginalised communities online. She previously held roles at Amnesty International, the World Wide Web Foundation, and Bumble, and was named to the BBC's 100 Women list in 2021.

== Early life and education ==
Dhrodia was born in Toronto, Canada, in 1985. She holds a Bachelor of Arts degree in Political Science from the University of British Columbia and a Master of Science degree in Human Rights from the London School of Economics.

== Career ==
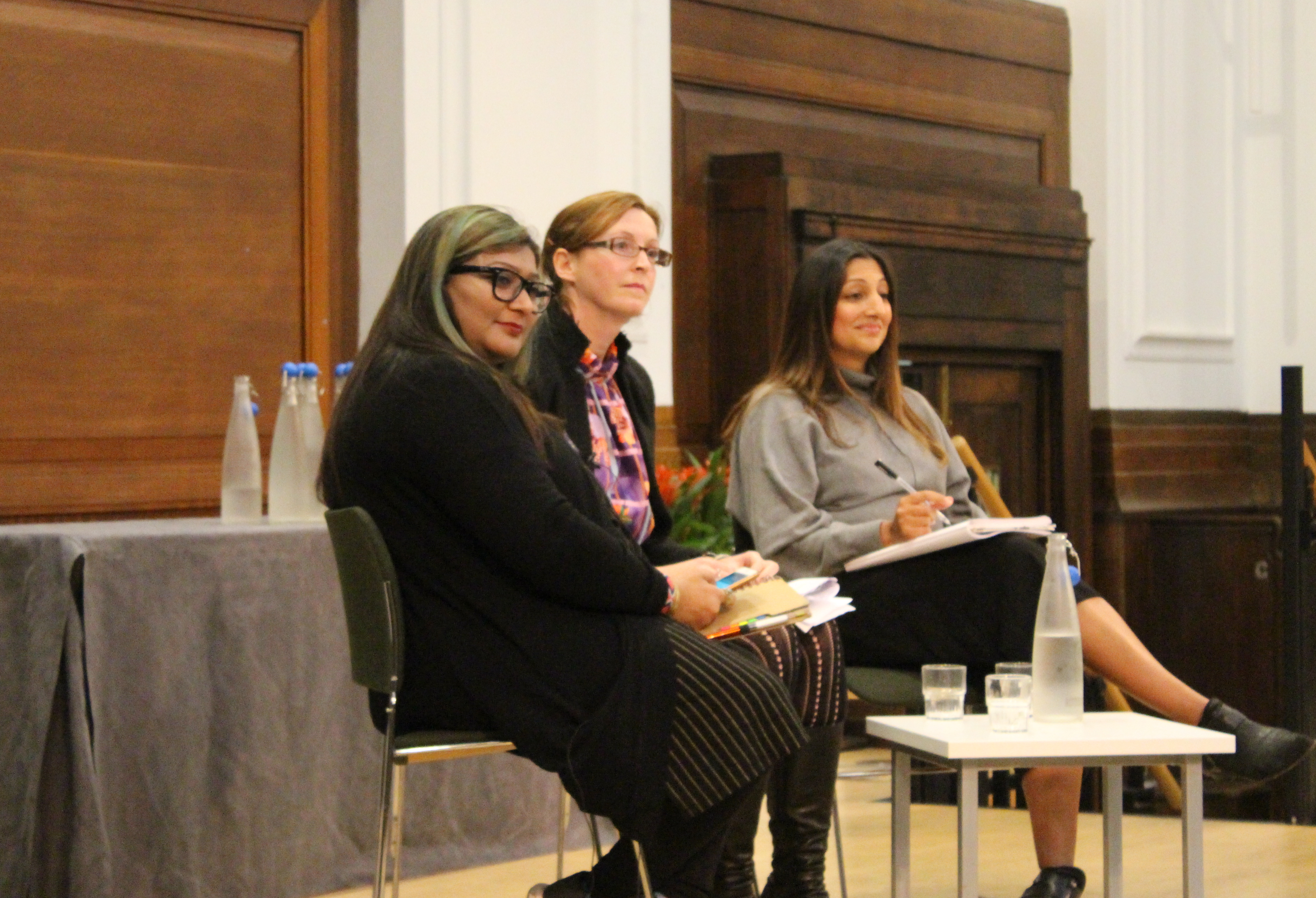
Dhrodia on the right at the Open Rights Group Conference in November 2017 with Nighat Dad on the left and Maria Farrell centre

Dhrodia joined Amnesty International in 2010, working initially on gender, sexuality, and identity issues before focusing on the human rights impacts of digital technology. With Amnesty's Technology and Human Rights Programme, she authored the 2018 report #ToxicTwitter: Violence and Abuse Against Women Online, which influenced public and policy debates on social media regulation from an intersectional human rights perspective. She led qualitative and quantitative research into online abuse, including interviews with politicians, journalists, activists, authors, and game developers, and research highlighting disproportionate harassment experienced by Black women and other marginalised groups.

From 2020 to 2021, Dhrodia was Senior Policy Manager at the World Wide Web Foundation, where she led multi-stakeholder collaborations focused on improving women's safety online. Her work included the Tech Policy Design Lab initiative, which brought together governments, civil society, and major technology companies and resulted in public safety commitments announced at the UN Generation Equality Forum.

From 2021 to 2024, Dhrodia served as Safety Policy Lead at Bumble, where she led the development of the company's global safety and content policies, including guidelines on hate speech, sexual harassment, child safety, misinformation, bullying and abusive conduct, and physical and sexual violence. She was a spokesperson on online safety issues in industry and media contexts.

Dhrodia currently works as an independent consultant on online safety and digital rights.

== Media and commentary ==
Dhrodia's research and commentary have been covered internationally by BBC News, The New York Times, The Guardian, Wired, Reuters, New Statesman, Stylist, CNET, and TechCrunch.

== Recognition ==
- Named to the BBC's 100 Women list in 2021.
- Member of the UN Expert Working Group on Technology-Facilitated Gender-Based Violence.
