= Nordisk Copyright Bureau =

Nordic copyright collection society

- Founded: 1915
- Headquarters: Copenhagen, Denmark
- Website: www.ncb.dk

Nordisk Copyright Bureau (n©b) is a copyright collecting society which maintains Nordic and Baltic composers', writers' and producers' copyrights.

NCB is based in Copenhagen, Denmark, and is owned by the collecting societies in the Nordic countries; KODA (DK), STEF (IS), STIM (SE), Teosto (FI) and TONO (NO).
