= Shahid Hamid =

Pakistani lawyer and politician

- Occupations: Politician, Senior Advocate
- Known for: Governor of Punjab
- Political party: Pakistan Muslim League (N)
- Parent: Hamid Nawaz (father)
- Relatives: Zahid Hamid (brother)

Shahid Hamid (Punjabi, Urdu: شاہد حامد) is a Pakistani lawyer and former politician who served as the Governor of Punjab from 11 March 1997 to 18 August 1999, during Nawaz Sharif's second term in office as Prime Minister. He was affiliated with the Pakistan Muslim League (N). He is a lawyer by profession having studied from PULC, he is a senior advocate in the Supreme Court of Pakistan and is considered an authoritative legal and constitutional expert of the country. He also served as the caretaker Defence Minister of Pakistan from 5 November 1996 to 17 February 1997.

== Personal life ==
Shahid Hamid's father, Hamid Nawaz, was an activist of the Pakistan Movement and an admirer of Muhammad Ali Jinnah. Hamid Nawaz also served in the Pakistan Army and retired as a Brigadier in 1975 and later served as an ambassador of Pakistan in various countries. Hamid Nawaz died in 2009 at the age of 94. Shahid's brother, Zahid Hamid, is also a politician who was a minister in Nawaz Sharif's third cabinet. He belongs to Kakazai family of Pasrur.
