= Censorship of X =

Restrictions to access on X by governments

Since the launch in 2006, X, formerly Twitter, has been subjected to Internet censorship by governments and other authorities which may take unilateral action to block Internet access to X or its content. The social media platform is currently blocked in China, Iran, Myanmar, North Korea, Russia, and Turkmenistan.

== Countries where access to X/Twitter is currently blocked ==
=== China ===
X is officially blocked in China; however, many Chinese people circumvent the block to use it. Even major Chinese companies and national medias, such as Huawei and CCTV, use X through a government-approved VPN. The official account of China's Ministry of Foreign Affairs started tweeting in English in December 2019; meanwhile, Chinese diplomats, embassies and consulates maintained 55 identified accounts on Twitter as of 2019, with over half having been established within the year alone.

In 2010, Cheng Jianping was sentenced to one year in a labor camp for "retweeting" a comment that suggested boycotters of Japanese products should instead attack the Japanese pavilion at Expo 2010. Her fiancé, who posted the initial comment, claims it was actually a satire of anti-Japanese sentiment in China.

According to a Washington Post report, in 2019, state security officials visited some users in China to request them to delete certain tweets. The Chinese police would produce printouts of tweets and advise users to delete either the specific messages or their entire accounts. The New York Times described the process as "unusually broad and punitive". The targets of the crackdown even included lurkers on the platform with very few followers. In 2019, a Chinese student at the University of Minnesota was arrested and sentenced to six months in prison when he returned to China, for posting tweets mocking Chinese paramount leader Xi Jinping while in the US.

On July 3, 2020, Twitter announced that all data and information requests for Hong Kong authorities were immediately paused after the Hong Kong national security law, which was imposed by the Chinese government, went into effect. According to the official verdicts as of 2020, at least hundreds of Chinese were sentenced to prison for using Twitter to like, post or share tweets. According to the documents obtained by The New York Times in 2021, Shanghai police were trying to use technology means to find out the true identities of Chinese users of specific accounts on foreign social media, including Twitter. In 2022, Peiter Zatko, Twitter's former head of security, accused Twitter of accepting funding from unnamed "Chinese entities", which gave them access to the information of users in China, and Twitter knew that could endanger these users. Zatko also disclosed that FBI notified Twitter of at least one Chinese agent in the company.

=== Iran ===
During the 2009 Iranian presidential election, the Iranian government blocked Twitter due to fear of protests being organized. In September 2013, the blocking of both Twitter and Facebook was briefly lifted without notice due to a technical error, but within a day the websites were blocked again.

=== Myanmar ===
On February 5, 2021, the military State Administration Council, which assumed power following a coup d'état, ordered mobile and Internet providers to block Twitter and Instagram in the country, after a similar censorship measure was imposed on Facebook. A spokesperson for Twitter subsequently said that the company would "continue to advocate to end destructive government-led shutdowns".

=== North Korea ===
In April 2016, North Korea started to block Twitter "in a move underscoring its concern with the spread of online information". Anyone who tries to access it without special permission from the North Korean government, including foreign visitors and residents, is subject to punishment.

=== Russia ===
On February 26, 2022, during the invasion of Ukraine, Russia began restricting access to Twitter, with global internet monitor NetBlocks observing that the censorship measure was in effect "across multiple providers." Despite direct connections being restricted, Russians could still access Twitter via VPN services. The decision was subsequently announced by Roskomnadzor as a measure to curtail information on Twitter and Facebook that did not align with the government of Russia's positions.

=== Turkmenistan ===
As of 2018, foreign news and opposition websites are blocked in Turkmenistan, and international social networks such as Twitter are "often inaccessible".

== Countries where access to X/Twitter was formerly blocked ==
=== Brazil ===
On August 30, 2024, Brazilian Supreme Federal Court justice Alexandre de Moraes ordered internet service providers (ISPs) to block X after its owner, Elon Musk, did not appoint a legal representative in Brazil as required by local regulations. This decision followed a dispute originating from Moraes' earlier requests to suspend X accounts linked to alleged misinformation regarding the 2023 Brazilian Congress attack. Musk restored these accounts, arguing they were protected under free speech principles, and expressed concerns about the scope of the judicial orders. Moraes responded by imposing a daily fine of R$50,000 (US$9,000) on Brazilian users accessing X via virtual private network (VPN), and initially directed Apple's App Store and Google's Play Store to remove VPN apps, a directive that was later withdrawn.

Various stakeholders raised concerns about the implications of the block. President Luiz Inácio Lula da Silva supported the court's decision, stating that Brazilian laws apply uniformly, while Musk described it as a challenge to platform operations and democratic principles.

On September 18, 2024, X briefly became accessible in Brazil due to traffic rerouting via Cloudflare, which the company attributed to a temporary configuration change; some interpreted this as a strategic response.

In late September 2024, X complied by paying approximately US$5.2 million in fines and appointing a legal representative in Brazil. As a result, on October 8, 2024, the Supreme Federal Court lifted the ban, allowing X to resume operations nationwide.

=== Egypt ===
Twitter was inaccessible in Egypt on January 25, 2011, during the 2011 Egyptian revolution. Some news reports blamed the government of Egypt for blocking it. Vodafone Egypt, Egypt's largest mobile network operator, denied responsibility for the action in a tweet. Twitter's news releases did not state who the company believed instituted the block. As of January 26, Twitter was still confirming that the service was blocked in Egypt. On January 27, various reports claimed that access to the entire Internet from within Egypt had been shut down.

Shortly after the Internet shutdown, engineers at Google, Twitter, and SayNow, a voice-messaging startup company acquired by Google in January, announced the Speak To Tweet service. Google stated in its official blog that the goal of the service was to assist Egyptian protesters in staying connected during the Internet shutdown. Users could phone in a tweet by leaving a voicemail and use the Twitter hashtag #Egypt. These comments could be accessed without an Internet connection by dialing the same designated phone numbers. Those with Internet access could listen to the comments by visiting twitter.com/speak2tweet.

On February 2, 2011, connectivity was re-established by the four main Egyptian service providers. A week later, the heavy filtering that occurred at the height of the revolution had ended.

=== Nepal ===
The government of Nepal blocked access to X from September 4 to 9, 2025, after the company did not comply with local regulations pertaining to local registration. The block contributed to anti-corruption protests in Nepal.

=== Nigeria ===
Access to Twitter was blocked in Nigeria from June 5, 2021, to January 13, 2022. The blocking occurred after Twitter deleted tweets made by, and temporarily suspended, the Nigerian president Muhammadu Buhari, warning the southeastern people of Nigeria, predominantly Igbo people, of a potential repeat of the 1967 Nigerian Civil War due to the ongoing insurgency in Southeastern Nigeria. The Nigerian government claimed that the deletion of the president's tweets factored into their decision, but it was ultimately based on "a litany of problems with the social media platform in Nigeria, where misinformation and fake news spread through it have had real world violent consequences", citing the persistent use of the platform for activities that are capable of undermining Nigeria's corporate existence.

=== Pakistan ===
In February 2024, X was blocked by Pakistani state authorities ahead of the 2024 general election. The ban was upheld in April, citing national security concerns. Despite the government's stance, both the government and the Pakistan Telecommunication Authority (PTA) refused to comment on the outages, which were widely reported by internet watchdog groups.

Activists challenging the ban argue that it was designed to suppress dissent following the general election, which was marred by widespread claims of vote rigging and subsequent protests. Authorities had also shut down mobile services on the day of the election, again citing security concerns. NetBlocks, an internet monitoring group, reported that users were unable to access Twitter on February 10 while the country was awaiting election results.

In April, the Sindh High Court ordered the government to restore access to the platform within one week, according to a report by the AFP news agency, citing lawyer Moiz Jaaferi, who had launched a separate challenge against the ban. Despite this order, access to Twitter had been sporadic, with availability fluctuating based on the internet service provider, forcing users to rely on virtual private networks (VPNs), as noted by Alp Toker of NetBlocks.

Imran Khan's Pakistan Tehreek-e-Insaf (PTI) party, a prolific user of social media platforms, had been particularly impacted by this ban. This reliance on social media grew especially after the country's traditional media began censoring news about Khan and his party in the run-up to the election. Khan, who has more than 20 million followers on Twitter, saw his party call for protests against alleged rigging in the 2024 election. A government official's admission of vote manipulation in mid-February raised further concerns about the transparency of the election, confirming Khan's claims to many and furthering the allegations.

NetBlocks confirmed through its Live metrics showing X had been restricted in Pakistan since February, with service remaining fully or intermittently restricted for most users. They added that the incident came amidst a surge in internet censorship during the general election. Asad Baig, a media strategist at Dawn News, said that "The government's actions reek of authoritarianism, stifling dissent, and silencing voices in the name of maintaining control." Several condemnations of the Pakistani X ban were also exchanged by many non-governmental organizations.

On May 7, 2025, access was restored amid the 2025 India–Pakistan conflict.

=== Tanzania ===
On October 29, 2020, ISPs in Tanzania blocked access to Twitter and other social media platforms during the general election.

=== Turkey ===
On March 21, 2014, access to Twitter in Turkey was temporarily blocked, after a court ordered that "protection measures" be applied to the service. This followed earlier remarks by Prime Minister Recep Tayyip Erdoğan who vowed to "wipe out Twitter" following damaging allegations of corruption in his inner circle. However, on March 26, 2014, Istanbul Anatolia 18th Criminal Court of Peace suspended the above-mentioned court order. Turkey's constitutional court later ruled that the ban was illegal. Two weeks after the Turkish government blocked the site, the Twitter ban was lifted.

Some of the country's Internet providers restricted access to Twitter during the 2023 Turkey–Syria earthquakes and its aftermath. No official statement has been made regarding the restriction.

=== Uzbekistan ===
On July 2, 2021, Uzbekistan blocked access to Twitter along with TikTok, VKontakte, and Skype after stating that they had violated a new personal data law. This also came amid new laws passed that criminalized insulting or slandering the president online, amid an upcoming presidential election later that year. The sites were briefly unblocked on March 16, 2022, before being blocked again hours later. The bans on access to Twitter and VKontakte were again lifted on August 1, 2022.

=== Venezuela ===
On August 8, 2024, President Nicolás Maduro announced a ban on access to X for ten days amid anti-government protests, citing incitations of hatred, fascism and civil war. The ban was subsequently extended for an indefinite period, until it was lifted on January 13, 2026, following the Capture of Nicolás Maduro in the 2026 United States intervention in Venezuela, after more than a year of blockage under Maduro.

== See also ==
- Deplatforming
- Shadow banning
- Twitter suspensions
- Twitter Files
- Restrictions on TikTok
- Censorship of YouTube
- Censorship of Facebook
- Censorship of Instagram
- Censorship of TikTok
