= Ali Zahid =

Pakistani politician

Ali Zahid Hamid
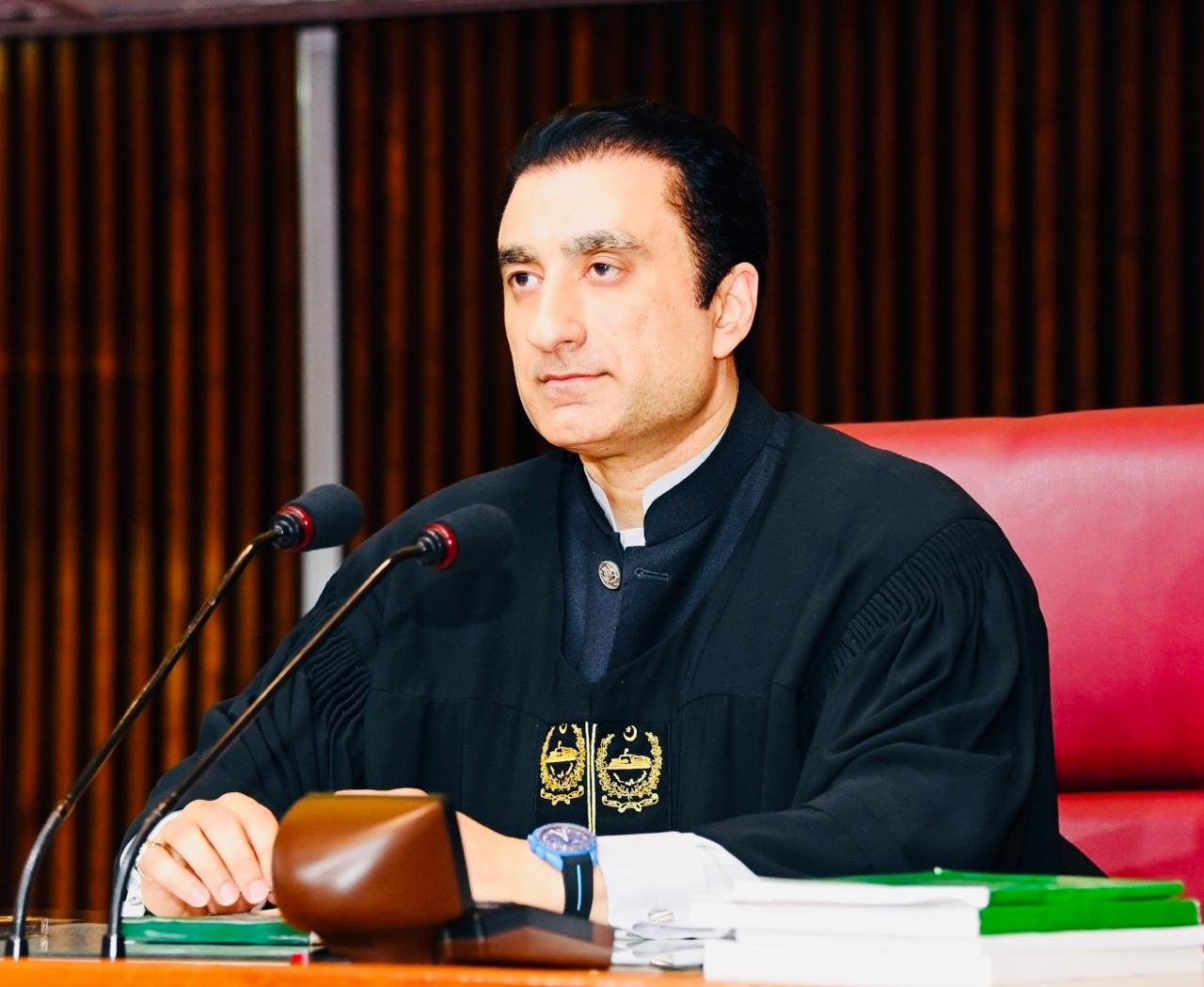

Member of the National Assembly of Pakistan
- Incumbent
- Assumed office 29 February 2024
- Constituency: NA-72 Sialkot-III
- In office 13 August 2018 – 10 August 2023
- Constituency: NA-74 (Sialkot-III)

Personal details
- Party: PMLN (2018-present)
- Parent: Zahid Hamid (father)

Ali Zahid Hamid is a Pakistani politician who has been a member of the National Assembly of Pakistan since February 2024 and previously served in this position from August 2018 till August 2023.

== Early life and family ==
Ali Hamid was born to the former Federal Minister Zahid Hamid.

He previously held a Singaporean citizenship.

== Political career ==
He was elected to the National Assembly of Pakistan as a candidate of Pakistan Muslim League (Nawaz) (PML-N) from constituency NA-74 (Sialkot-III) in the 2018 Pakistani general election. He received 97,235 votes and defeated Chaudhary Ghulam Abbas, a candidate of the Pakistan Tehreek-e-Insaf.

In the 2024 Pakistani general election, Ali Zahid contested from the National Assembly constituency NA-72 Sialkot-III as a candidate of the Pakistan Muslim League (Nawaz) (PML-N). He won the seat with 109,507 votes, according to a constituency report published by the Free and Fair Election Network (FAFEN).

Ali Zahid was elected as a Member of the National Assembly of Pakistan from the constituency NA-72 Sialkot-III as a candidate of the Pakistan Muslim League (Nawaz) (PML-N). He took the oath of office as a Member of the National Assembly on 29 February 2024.

In December 2025, Ali Zahid met Prime Minister Shehbaz Sharif at the Prime Minister's House in Islamabad. According to the Associated Press of Pakistan, discussions during the meeting covered matters related to his constituency and the overall political situation of the country.

== Current parliamentary role ==
In July 2022, Ali Zahid Hamid was appointed as Parliamentary Secretary for Defence by Prime Minister Shehbaz Sharif. He was among 18 Members of the National Assembly appointed as parliamentary secretaries for different federal ministries.

During the current parliamentary term, Ali Zahid Hamid has served as a member of a Sub-Committee of the Standing Committee on Finance and Revenue of the National Assembly.

Ali Zahid has served on the Panel of Chairpersons of the National Assembly. Under Rule 13 of the Rules of Procedure and Conduct of Business in the National Assembly, members of the panel are nominated to preside over proceedings of the House in the absence of the Speaker and the Deputy Speaker.

== International engagements ==
Ali Zahid Hamid participated in a meeting between Pakistani parliamentarians and Iranian officials, during which both sides discussed strengthening bilateral relations, including increasing direct flights between Pakistan and Iran.

In October 2024, Ali Zahid Hamid was a member of a parliamentary delegation from Pakistan that visited the United Kingdom to participate in official engagements with British parliamentarians and representatives of the Pakistani diaspora.

In July 2025, Ali Zahid Hamid was a member of an eight-member Government of Pakistan delegation led by Minister of State Bilal Azhar Kayani during an official visit to the United Arab Emirates under the UAE Government's Experience Exchange Programme (EEP). The delegation held meetings with senior UAE officials to discuss governance, digital transformation, public sector modernization, leadership development and institutional cooperation between Pakistan and UAE.

== Constituency activities ==
Ali Zahid Hamid has participated in discussions and meetings concerning constituency matters.

== Cricket activities ==
Ali Zahid Hamid participated in the 2019 Inter-Parliamentary Cricket World Cup held in England as a member of the Pakistan parliamentary cricket team. Before the tournament, he expressed his commitment to contributing to the team's performance in the competition. The event featured parliamentarians from different countries competing in cricket.
