= NA-72 Sialkot-III =

Constituency of the National Assembly of Pakistan

- Constituency for the National Assembly of Pakistan
- Region: Pasrur Tehsil (partly) of Sialkot District
- Electorate: 475,866

Current constituency
- Party: Pakistan Muslim League (N)
- Member: Ali Zahid
- Created from: NA-114 Sialkot-V

NA-72 Sialkot-III (این اے-72، سيالکوٹ-3) is a constituency for the National Assembly of Pakistan. It is made up of the Pasrur Tehsil.

== Members of Parliament ==
=== 2018–2023: NA-74 Sialkot-III ===
Election	Member	Party
2018	Ali Zahid	PML (N)

=== 2024–present: NA-72 Sialkot-III ===
Election	Member	Party
2024	Ali Zahid	PML (N)

== Election 2002 ==
General elections were held on 10 October 2002. Zahid Hamid of PML-Q won by 73,529 votes.

General election 2002: NA-114 Sialkot-V
Party	Candidate	Votes	%	±%
PML(Q)	Zahid Hamid Khan	73,529	46.77	
PPP	Ghulam Abbas	64,749	41.18	
PML(N)	Ch. Javed Iqbal Virk	18,172	11.56	
Independent	Khairat Hussain Ch.	779	0.53	
Turnout		163,026	47.67	
Total valid votes		157,229	96.44	
Rejected ballots		5,797	3.56	
Majority		8,780	5.59	
Registered electors		342,003		

== Election 2008 ==
General elections were held on 18 February 2008. Zahid Hamid of PML-N won by 62,362 votes.

General election 2008: NA-114 Sialkot-V
Party	Candidate	Votes	%	±%
PML(N)	Zahid Hamid Khan	62,362	35.61	
PML(Q)	Ch. Abdul Sattar	56,343	32.18	
PPP	Ghulam Abbas	55,797	31.86	
Others	Others (two candidates)	611	0.35	
Turnout		181,121	59.34	
Total valid votes		175,113	96.68	
Rejected ballots		6,008	3.32	
Majority		6,019	3.43	
Registered electors		305,217		
PML(N) gain from PML(Q)				

== Election 2013 ==
General elections were held on 11 May 2013. Zahid Hamid of PML-N won by 131,607 votes and became the member of National Assembly.

General election 2013: NA-114 Sialkot-V
Party	Candidate	Votes	%	±%
PML(N)	Zahid Hamid Khan	131,607	61.86	
Independent	Ghulam Abbas	38,293	18.00	
Independent	Yasir Irfan ul Islam	18,675	8.78	
PTI	Syed Akhtar Hussain Rizvi	18,535	8.71	
Others	Others (twelve candidates)	5,643	2.65	
Turnout		218,028	57.15	
Total valid votes		212,753	97.58	
Rejected ballots		5,275	2.42	
Majority		93,314	43.86	
Registered electors		381,496		
PML(N) hold				

== Election 2018 ==
General elections were held on 25 July 2018.

General election 2018: NA-74 Sialkot-III
Party	Candidate	Votes	%	±%
PML(N)	Ali Zahid	97,235	36.89	
PTI	Ghulam Abbas	93,734	35.56	
TLP	Shujaat Ali	34,295	13.01	
Others	Others (eight candidates)	29,415	11.16	
Turnout		263,607	55.40	
Rejected ballots		8,928	3.38	
Majority		3,501	1.33	
Registered electors		475,866		
PML(N) hold		Swing	N/A	

== Election 2024 ==
General elections were held on 8 February 2024. Ali Zahid won the election with 109,507 votes.

General election 2024: NA-72 Sialkot-III
Party	Candidate	Votes	%	±%
PML(N)	Ali Zahid	109,507	37.70	▲0.81
PTI	Chaudhry Amjad Ali Bajwa (Note: Filed nomination papers as PTI candidate but ECP allowed him to run as an Independent)	103,640	35.68	▼0.12
TLP	Shujaat Ali	44,522	15.33	▲2.32
Independent	Aisf Ali Bajwa	7,585	2.61	N/A
Independent	Muhammad Akram	5,978	2.06	N/A
Independent	Iftikhar Afzal	4,860	1.67	N/A
Others	Others (seventeen candidates)	14,360	4.95	
Turnout		298,072	49.84	▼5.56
Total valid votes		290,452	97.44	
Rejected ballots		7,620	2.56	
Majority		5,867	2.02	▲0.69
Registered electors		598,020		
PML(N) hold				

== See also ==
- NA-71 Sialkot-II
- NA-73 Sialkot-IV
