= Speak To Tweet =

Speak To Tweet or speak2tweet is a communications service which allows users to leave a "tweet" on Twitter by calling a designated international telephone number and leaving a voice message. The service was developed to help people stay connected when an Internet connection is unavailable, specifically in response to the Internet shutdown during the 2011 Egyptian revolution. Speak2tweet service was launched for Syria on 30 November 2012.

== Egyptian Revolution ==
As a reaction to protests in Cairo, the Egyptian government shut down the Internet throughout that country on 26 January 2011 in the days prior to the 2011 revolution.

As a way to help the people of Egypt, engineers at Google, Twitter, and voice-messaging startup SayNow, which had just been acquired by Google, created a speak-to-tweet service over the next weekend in January 2011. They gained permission to launch the service late on Saturday 29 January, and Google spokesmen publicly revealed the service on 31 January, using its official blog, and stating the goal of the service was to assist the Egyptian people to stay connected, and that the service was already live.

== Operation ==
Users can create a tweet by phoning a variety of international phone numbers and leaving a voicemail message; the service instantly tweets the message with the hashtag #Egypt, without the need for an Internet connection. As of 1 February 2011, the service had been updated to try to detect the country of origin of each call, and to use that as the hashtag instead of the default of #Egypt.

The messages can be accessed by either dialing one of the same phone numbers, or through the Twitter account "twitter.com/speak2tweet". The Twitter feed contains a link to the voice message on Google's SayNow.
