= 2017 Fayzabad protests =

Protest in Pakistan from November to December 2017

2017 Faizabad sit-in
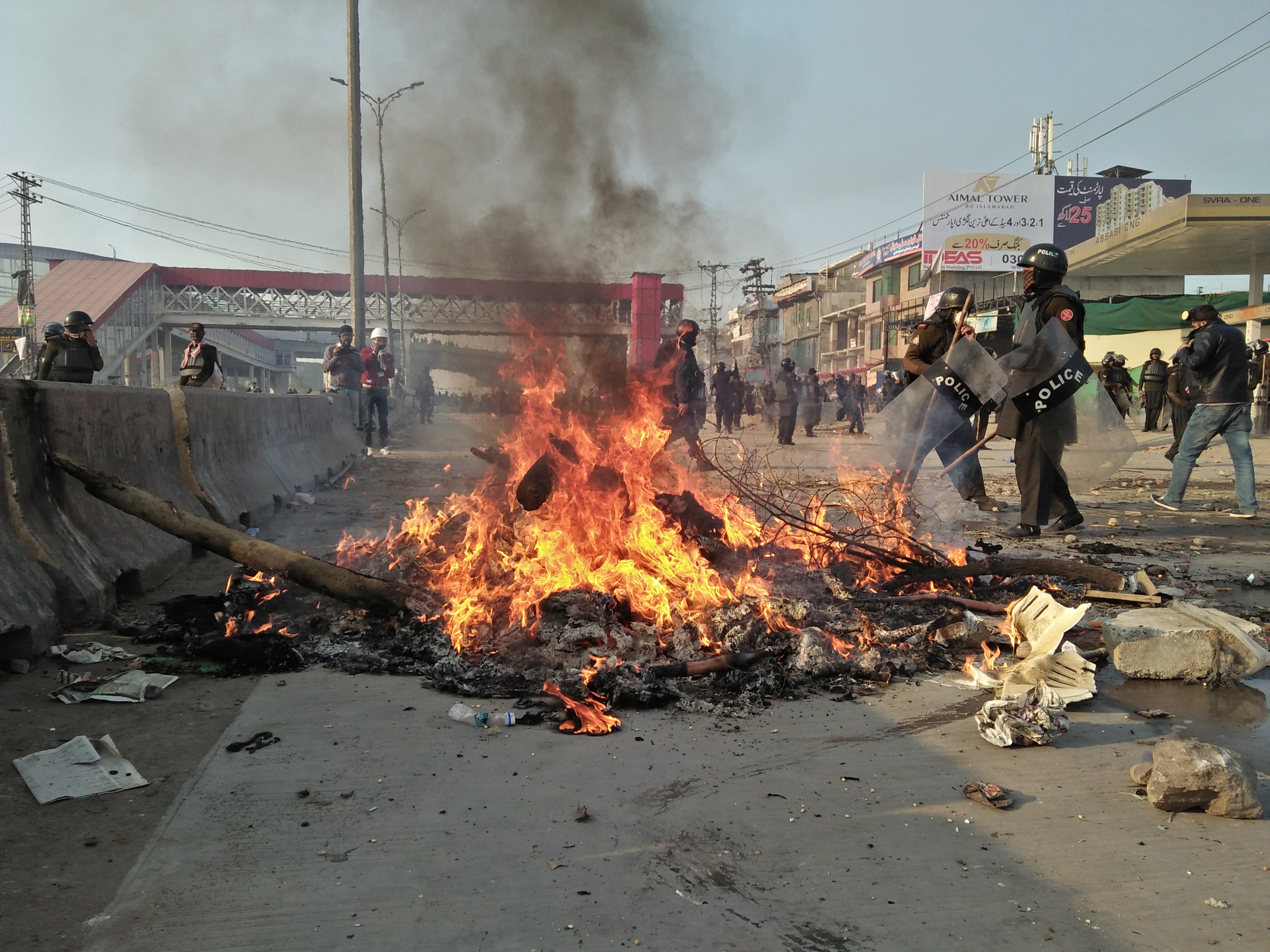
- Police clash with protesters, 25 November 2017.
- Date: 8 November 2017 – 18 December 2017
- Location: Faizabad Interchange
- Caused by: Changes made to the Elections Bill 2017 as to the oath required for parliamentarians in the belief of finality of prophethood of Muhammad
- Goals: Restoration of Finality of the Prophethood bill Resignation of Zahid Hamid
- Methods: Sit-in
- Status: Resignation of Zahid Hamid; Finality of the Prophethood law restored as it was before the amendment Agreement between the military and TLYRA on behalf of the Government of Pakistan
- Result: Deal made. Tehreek-e-Labbaik Victory: Zahid Hamid resigns; Tehreek-e-Labbaik subsequently ends the protest

Parties
Tehreek-e-Labaik; Pakistan Sunni Tehreek; Majlis-e-Tahaffuz-e-Khatme Nabuwwat	Government of Pakistan; Minister for Law and Justice

Lead figures
Khadim Hussain Rizvi	Qamar Javed Bajwa; Faiz Hameed; Shahid Khaqan Abbasi; Zahid Hamid

Casualties
- Deaths: 6+
- Injuries: 200+

The 2017 Faizabad protest was a sit in held by the Tehreek-e-Labbaik Pakistan (TLP) from 8 November 2017 to 18 December 2017 at the Faizabad Interchange. The protests were caused by the change of the word oath to declaration in the Elections Bill 2017. The protesters demanded the resignation of Minister for Law and Justice Zahid Hamid.

The TLP's objective was achieved as the Pakistani law minister Zahid Hamid stepped down on 27 November 2017 culminating in an end to the protests that continued for 20 days without harm until, despite all the warnings given out by various religious groups about the sensitivity of the matter, because of the violence and the disturbance caused by the protesters the government was forced to use force against the protestors.

== Demands ==
They demanded that the government identify and punish those persons responsible for the change of wording in the declaration of the Finality Of prophethood of Prophet Muhammad in the election laws and the resignation of Law Minister Zahid Hamid over accusations of removing the clause.

== Negotiations ==
The negotiations did not start until after a week of protest as the oppositions and people started to condemn governments policy of ignoring the protesters. Several bilateral talks ended in failure as the protesters were steadfast on their demand of resignation of law minister. Some of the delegations that went on behalf of government also called the demands of the protesters to be just.

=== Issue behind protest ===
According to the government version, it was an oversight in the Election Bill 2017 (one of the forms, on the subject relating one's belief in the finality of prophethood of Muhammad, substituting the phrase “I solemnly swear” with “I believe”). The National Assembly of Pakistan claimed it as a “clerical error” and later restored the original clause in the Election Act related to the finality of the prophethood in an oath that was turned into a religious and political controversy. However, the government failed to satisfy the protesting clerics.

== Internet blocking and media blackouts ==
On 25 November 2017, the NetBlocks internet shutdown observatory and Digital Rights Foundation identified mass-scale blocking of social media and content-sharing websites YouTube, Twitter and Facebook throughout Pakistan. Transmission of TV news channels were put off-air by PEMRA as a strategy of operation against sit-in protesters at Faizabad interchange, which immediately ignited as a countrywide demonstrations. Pakistan Broadcasters Association condemned the government's unilateral shut down of news channels on 25 November 2017. However, transmission of news channels were restored by PEMRA in the afternoon of 26 November 2017 and the PTA was instructed to lift its ban over social media websites.

== Reactions ==
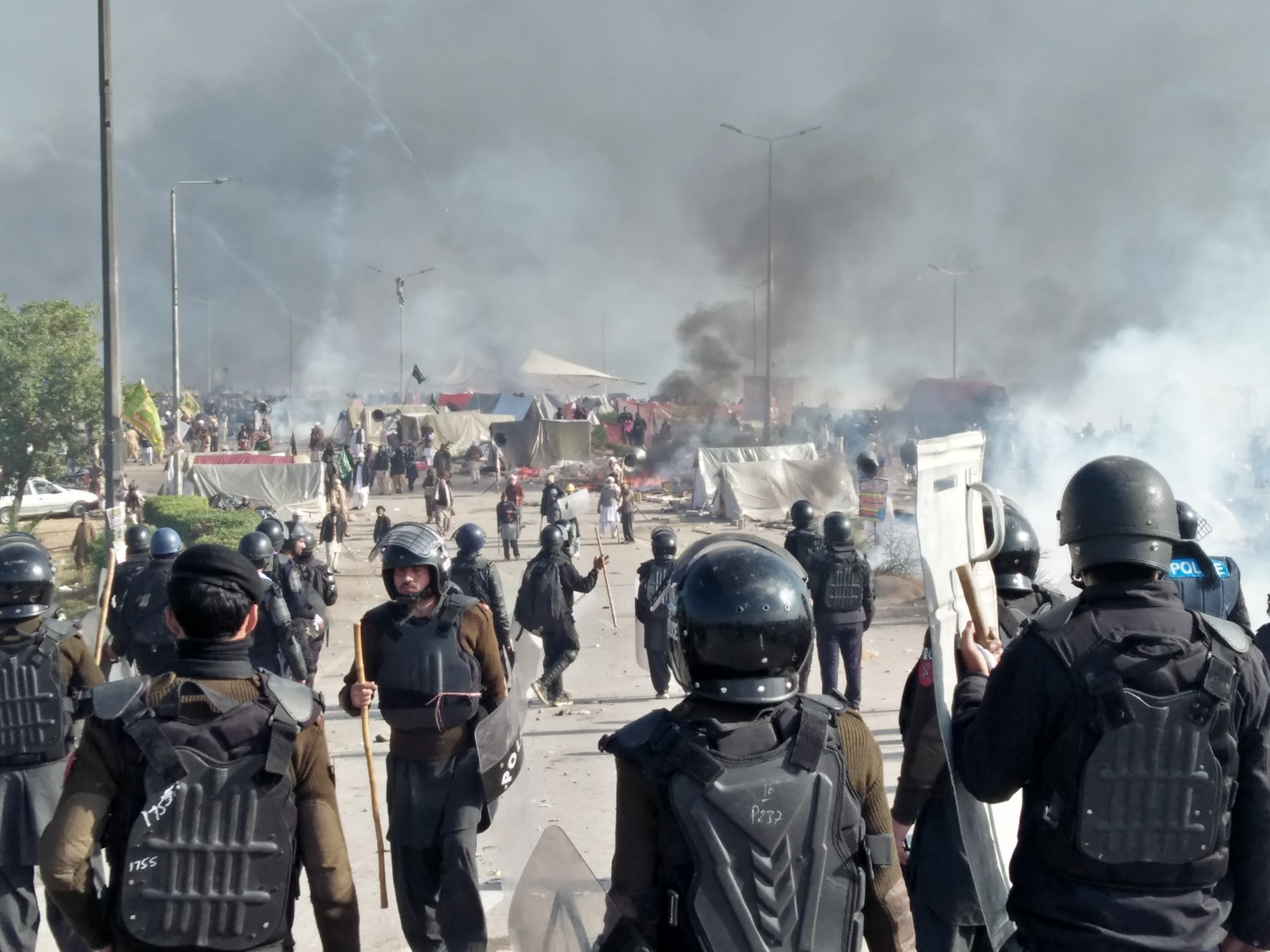
Clash with police, 25 November 2017.

On 25 November 2017, police launched an operation using tear gas and water canons to clear the area where Tehreek-e-Labaik protesters had camped out for the last 20 days as they have blocked the main routes into the capital of Islamabad, after the police, the government called the army to control the law and order situation in the federal capital (Islamabad). The protest took place in other parts of the country, including both rural and urban areas. The government faced strong reactions by general public and a large numbers of protestors blocked the national highways throughout the country. Police was withdrawn from most of cities to avoid clashes. This crackdown also sparked outraged against the ruling party and many mob attacks took place on homes of Members of Pakistan Muslim League (N) causing them to flee from their homes. Many more protesters died during clashes in Karachi and outskirts of Lahore. Sit in's were held until the leadership at Faizabad asked them to disperse after the agreement. The crowds dispersed peacefully. Head of the Moon Sighting Council Mufti Muneeb ur Rehman strongly condemned the action of the government. Pakistani politician Imran Khan called for the protests to remain peaceful, while not explicitly supporting or opposing the goals of Tehreek-e-Labbaik. Controversy came about on Pakistani social media after footage leaked showing a senior Pakistani military official handling out money.

== Supreme Court case ==
On 21 November 2017, the Supreme Court of Pakistan initiated a suo motu case pertaining to the sit-in. On 22 November 2018, a two-judge Supreme Court bench consisting of Justice Qazi Faez Isa and Justice Mushir Alam reserved its judgement on the case. On 6 February 2019, the Supreme Court issued the 43-page judgment authored by Justice Isa.

The written verdict stated that the person issuing an edict or fatwa, which harms another or puts another in harm's way, ‘must be criminally prosecuted under the Pakistan Penal Code, the Anti-Terrorism Act, 1997 or the Prevention of Electronic Crimes Act, 2016’. The top court further stated in the verdict that Inter-Services Intelligence, the Intelligence Bureau, Military Intelligence, and the Inter-Services Public Relations must not exceed their respective mandates. “All intelligence agencies do not have the authority to interfere with broadcasts and publications, in the management of broadcasters/publishers and in the distribution of newspapers.”

"The Constitution emphatically prohibits members of the armed forces from engaging in any kind of political activity, which includes supporting a political party, faction, or individual. The Government of Pakistan through the Ministry of Defence and the respective chiefs of the Army, the Navy, and the Air Force are directed to initiate action against the personnel under their command who are found to have violated their oath," the court said.
