= Bytes for All v. Federation of Pakistan =

Pakistani case on Internet censorship

Bytes for All v. Federation of Pakistan, (958/2013) commonly known as the YouTube case, is a 2013 Lahore High Court case regarding Internet freedom and censorship in Pakistan. The case was filed by Pakistani non-profit human rights organization BytesForAll and argued by lawyer Yasser Latif Hamdani. In this case, BytesForAll challenged internet filtering and surveillance by the Pakistan Telecommunication Authority, especially regarding YouTube.

After 14 hearings, Justice Mansoor Ali Shah referred the case to a larger bench on 19 September 2013. A 3- or 5-member bench of Lahore High Court will now deliberate the case. In May of 2014 the Lahore High Court referred the case to the Supreme Court.

YouTube was banned in Pakistan, amid rioting and protests in September 2012 after the appearance of a low-budget film called Innocence of Muslims on YouTube. The ban lasted until 2016. The constitutional challenges argues that the blanket ban on YouTube is unconstitutional as it violates the right to freedom of expression and speech guaranteed by the Constitution of Pakistan.
