= Zahid Hamid =

Pakistani politician and lawyer (born 1947)

- زاہدحامد

Minister for Law and Justice
- In office 4 August 2017 – 26 November 2017
- President: Mamnoon Hussain
- Prime Minister: Shahid Khaqan Abbasi
- Preceded by: Himself
- Succeeded by: Chaudhry Mehmood Bashir
- In office March 2016 – 28 July 2017
- President: Mamnoon Hussain
- Prime Minister: Nawaz Sharif
- Succeeded by: Himself
- In office 7 June 2013 – 22 June 2013
- Preceded by: Farook Naik
- Succeeded by: Pervez Rashid

Minister of Climate Change
- In office 17 November 2015 – 28 July 2017
- President: Mamnoon Hussain
- Prime Minister: Nawaz Sharif
- Preceded by: Mushahid Ullah Khan
- Succeeded by: Mushahid Ullah Khan

Minister of Science and Technology
- In office 23 June 2013 – 21 November 2014
- President: Mamnoon Hussain
- Prime Minister: Nawaz Sharif
- Preceded by: Chengez Khan

Director-General of the Environmental Protection Agency
- In office 27 December 1997 – 12 October 1999
- Preceded by: Office established
- Succeeded by: Asif Shuja Khan

Personal details
- Born: 24 October 1947 (age 79) Lahore, West Punjab, Pakistan
- Other political affiliations: PMLN (1993–2024)
- Children: Ali Zahid
- Parent: Hamid Nawaz (father)
- Relatives: Shahid Hamid (brother)
- Education: Punjab University (LLB); Cambridge University (BA and MA)

Zahid Hamid (Note: Urdu: زاہد حامد) (born 24 October 1947) is a Pakistani politician, and lawyer. A member of Pakistan Muslim League (Nawaz), Hamid previously served as the Minister for Law and Justice and Minister of Climate Change in the Third Sharif ministry between 2015 and 2017. He briefly served as the Minister of Law and Justice in June 2013 before being appointed Minister of Science and Technology from June 2013 to November 2014. He again served as Minister for Law and Justice under Prime Minister Shahid Khaqan Abbasi from August 2017 until he resigned in November 2017.

Hamid had been a member of the National Assembly of Pakistan from 2002 to May 2018.

== Family and education ==
Hamid was born on 24 October 1947 in Lahore, Punjab, to Hamid Nawaz, a two-time MNA who served in the Pakistan Army and retired as a Brigadier in 1975 and later served in foreign service tenured as diplomat in various countries.

Hamid's brother Shahid Hamid, served as Governor of Punjab in 1997 and was senior leader in Pakistan Muslim League.

After graduating from local school, Hamid attended the Punjab University where he studied law. In 1971, he graduated with a LLB. For higher studies, Hamid went to the United Kingdom to attend the Cambridge University. He graduated with a BA with honours in Philosophy and worked on the post-graduate studies. He gained a MA degree where his work contained the fundamentals of philosophy of law. Reportedly, he received his BA Honours and MA from Cambridge University.

In addition, Hamid has attended the seminars on management at the Business school of the Harvard University; and further specialised in law from International Development Law Organization based in Rome, Italy.

He is a lawyer by profession.

== Political career ==
In 1970, Hamid passed the CSS exam to join the Central Superior Services (CSS) where he worked with the provincial government of Punjab but resigned in 1978 from the CSS to start career in politics. He set up and managed two industrial units in the food sector from 1978 to 1988.

Hamid started his career as professional lawyer and eventually becoming a senior advocate at the Supreme Court of Pakistan.

In the 1990s, he established the Environmental Protection Agency authorised by Prime Minister Nawaz Sharif in 1997 and appointed the first Director-General of the Environmental Protection Agency until being dismissed by General Pervez Musharraf after staging a self-coup in 1999.

He ran for the seat of National Assembly in 1997 election as PPP candidate but was unsuccessful.

Following the military takeover, Hamid defected to the PML(N)'s splinter group led by Shuja'at Hussain, and successfully participated in NA-114 constituency during the general elections held nationwide in 2002. From 2004 to 2007, he tenured as Minister of State for Defence, Investment and Privatization; in 2008, he had been elevated as the Minister for Law.

In 2008, Hamid joined the PML(N). Between 2008 and 2013, he was active member of the PML-N in National Assembly when the party was in opposition.

In 2013, Hamid participated in the 2013 Pakistani general elections and elected as member of National Assembly from his constituency NA-114. He was appointed Law Minister in the Ministry of Law, Justice and Human Rights, but later he was reassigned to Science ministry. Due to the treason trial of Pervez Musharraf. Hamid abruptly resigned from the Science ministry after the special court inducted him on a Musharraf treason trial. On hearing the court's decision, Hamid tendered his resignation to Prime Minister Nawaz Sharif.

In November 2015 he was made Minister of Climate Change and in 2016, Hamid was given the additional portfolio of the Minister of Law and Justice. He had ceased to hold ministerial office in July 2017 when the federal cabinet was disbanded following the disqualification of Prime Minister Nawaz Sharif by the Supreme Court of Pakistan in Panama Papers case decision. Following the election of Shahid Khaqan Abbasi as Prime Minister of Pakistan in August 2017, he was inducted into the federal cabinet of Abbasi. He was appointed federal Minister of Law and Justice. He stepped down from the ministerial office of Minister for Law and Justice in November 2017, following the 2017 Tehreek-e-Labaik protest.
