= Teosto =

Finnish performance rights organization

Teosto (Finnish: Säveltäjäin Tekijänoikeustoimisto Teosto r.y.) is a non-profit performance rights organization that collects royalties on behalf of songwriters and composers in Finland. Teosto is a member of the Confédération Internationale des Sociétés d'Auteurs et Compositeurs (CISAC). It represents 29 000 Finnish, and nearly three million foreign composers, songwriters, arrangers and publishers. The organization's clients are 29,000 music-using companies and communities.

Teosto has 75 important people making decisions. Its CEO is Risto Salminen since 2018, and composer Antti Auvinen is the chairman.

Teosto paid its clients 52.3 million euros in 2014 and with reimbursements from other organizations, Teosto's revenue grew up to 60.1 million euros. Part of that revenue are reimbursements from foreign sister-organizations for using Finnish music abroad, and reimbursements from the Danish Nordisk Copyright Bureau (NCB) for Finnish pieces as well as a lending compensation for music recordings and lending of music notes from libraries.

== History ==
A Group of Finnish music makers and publishers founded the organization in 1928 to regulate their rights.

== Activity ==
According to the organization's website:

- Teosto takes care of the economic rights of music makers' works.
- Teosto sells licenses for playing and recording music. Users of these licenses are radio and TV companies, organizers of concerts and companies using background music such as Taxis and barbershops.
- Teosto participates in music export. Export focused Music Finland is an organization that Teosto finances.
- Teosto annually gives out a Teosto Award. It is 40 000 euros, and can be shared by up to 3 musical works. The award must be given to a client of Teosto

== See also ==
- Copyright collecting agency
- List of CISAC members
- Nordisk Copyright Bureau
