= STIM =

Swedish performing rights society, music rights interest group

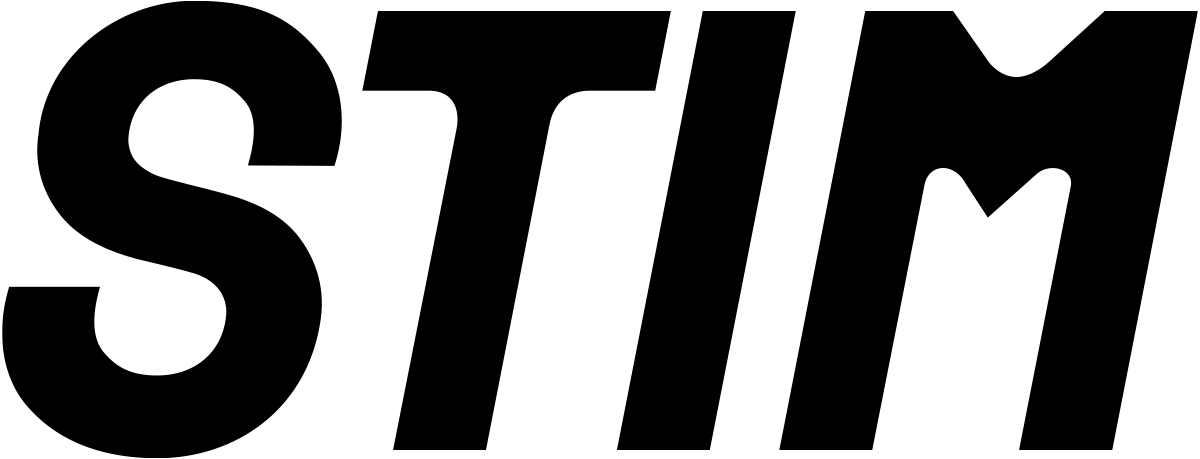
- Abbreviation: STIM
- Types: professional association
- Country: Sweden
- Website: www.stim.se

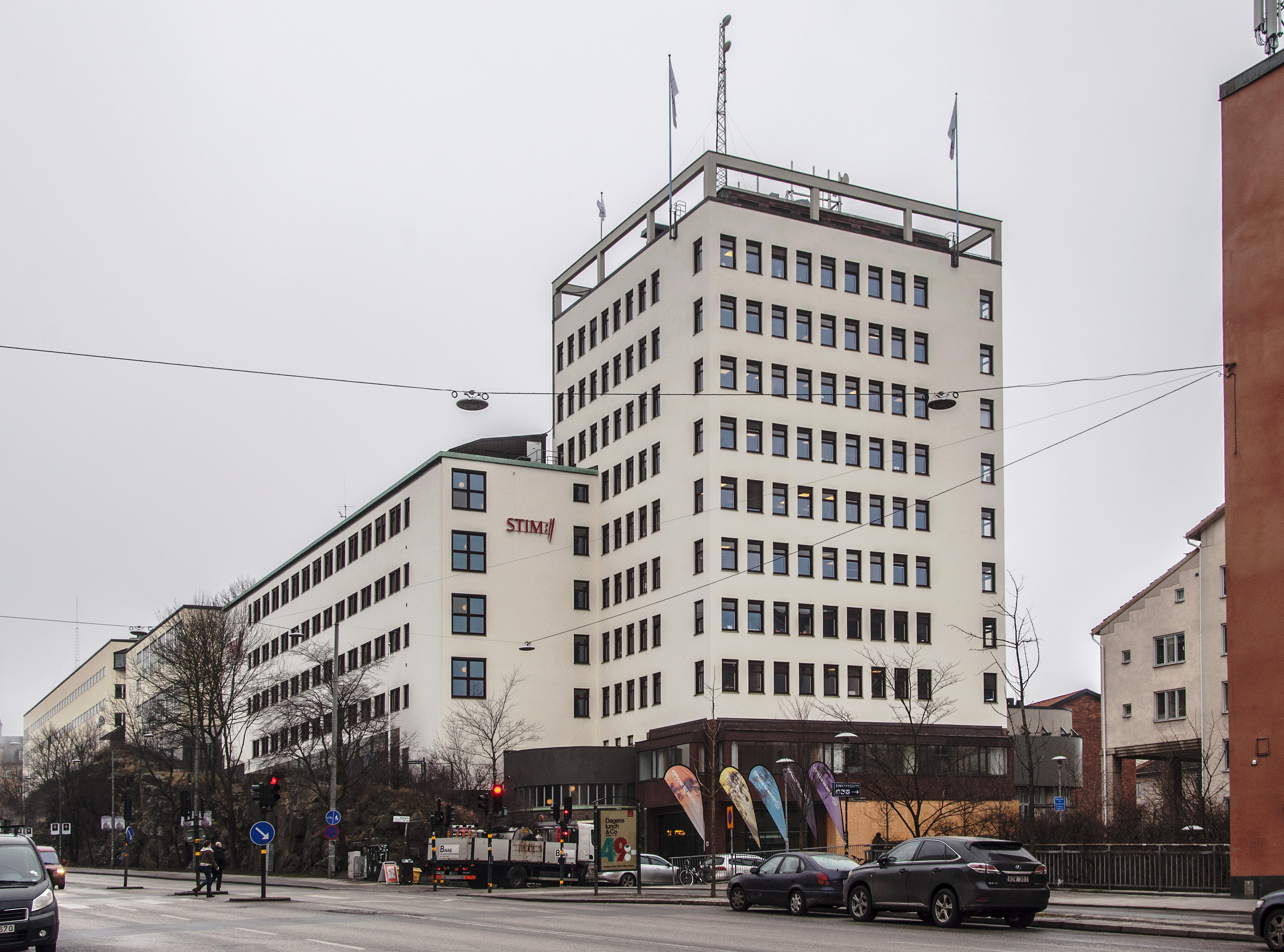
The office in Stockholm

STIM, Svenska Tonsättares Internationella Musikbyrå (Swedish Performing Rights Society), is a Swedish collecting society for songwriters, composers and music publishers. Its role is to act as an agent for its members in order to collect license fees whenever their musical works are performed in public, broadcast or transmitted, and to pay out performing royalties.

STIM was founded in 1923, a few years before Sveriges Radio began regular broadcasting. Initially an organization for collecting concert fees for composers of classical music, it has since expanded to all genres of music, and license fees from broadcasters have become an important source of income. The organization now has more than 71,000 members. In 2003–2007 the annual turnover was slightly more than 1000 million SEK.

Once an organization is set up, representing a majority of copyright holders within a type of works (as STIM is for composers of recorded music), Swedish copyright law (1960:729, chapter 3a, sections §42a–f) grants users of such works (e.g. broadcasters that use recorded music) the right to use all such works under a single contract with that organization. The collected fees are set by STIM, depending on the size of the audience but independent of the individual work or composer. An individual composer who disagrees, must actively opt out (§42b–e, 2nd paragraph) of this collective arrangement. A composer who wants a share of the fees has to join STIM as a member.

Copyrights are administered through another organization NCB of which STIM is part owner.

In 2019 they launched a new part of the office – Stim Music Room – which is a work space where all members can hang out, hold meetings, study as well as work in one of the well equipped studios. Everything is for free and is, according to STIM, a way of creating a space for songwriters where one can make new connections, write music and develop.

== See also ==
- List of copyright collection societies § Sweden
