= Nighat Dad =

Pakistani lawyer and Internet activist

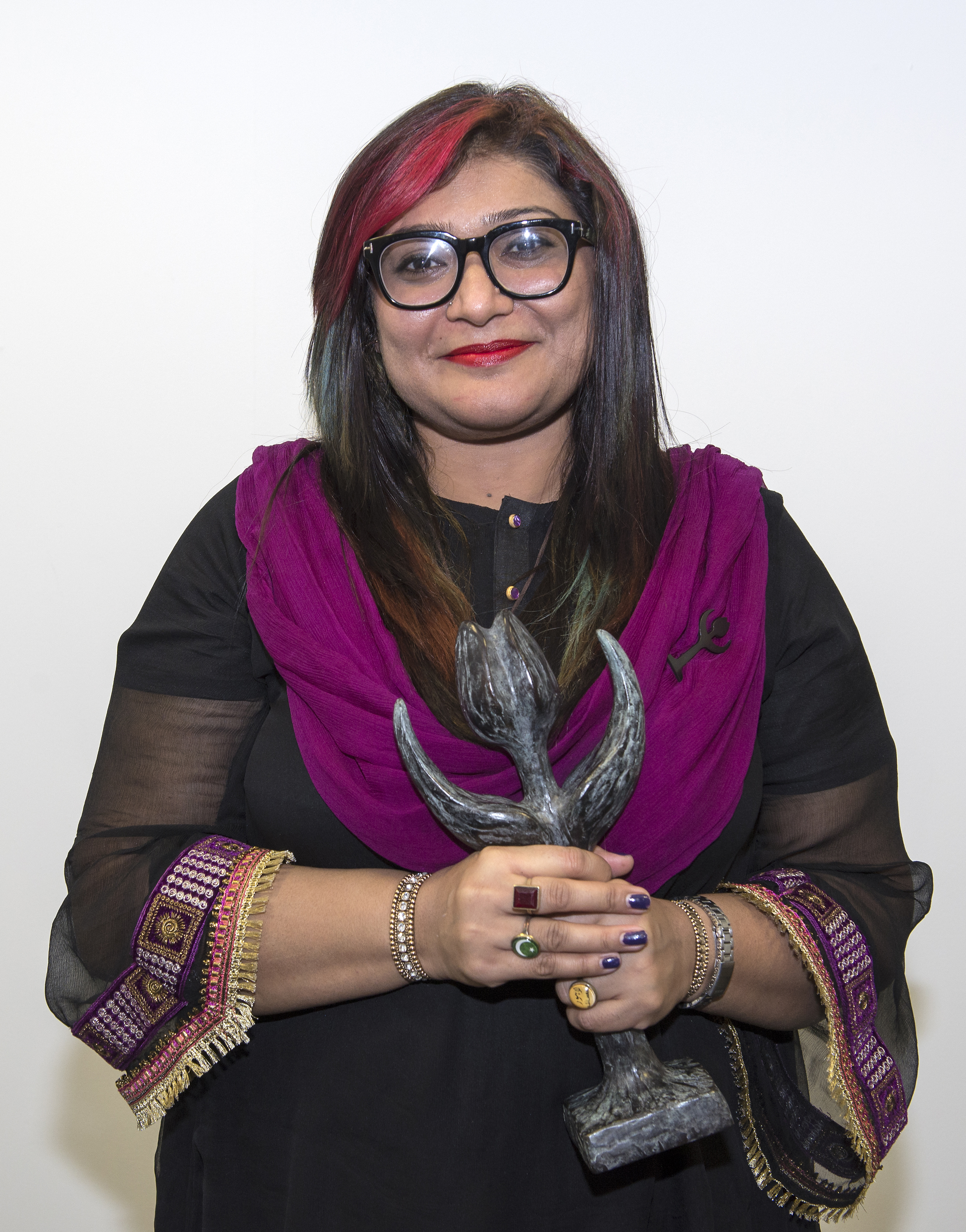
- Nighat Dad in December 2016
- Born: 1981 (age 44–45); Lahore, Punjab, Pakistan
- Education: University of the Punjab
- Occupations: Lawyer , Feminist
- Years active: 2012
- Children: 1

Nighat Dad (Urdu: نگہت داد; born c. 1981) is a Pakistani lawyer and Internet activist who runs the not-for-profit organisation Digital Rights Foundation. Her work in the field of IT security has earned her many international awards.

== Early life and education ==
Dad was born in 1981 in Lahore. She hails from a village in Jhang, Punjab. She received her education from the University of the Punjab, Lahore from where she has received a degree of the Master of Laws. Her marriage lasted only 18 months, and as a single mother, she had to wage a legal battle to win the custody of her child. During court proceedings she met many single mothers involved in legal battle to gain custody of their children, and she has been helping such women.

== Work ==
Dad is a lawyer by profession and practices criminal and family law.

In 2012, she set up the Digital Rights Foundation where she was executive director, educate Pakistani internet users, particularly women to protect themselves from online harassment. Pakistani activist for female education and the youngest-ever Nobel Prize laureate Malala Yousafzai has also attended workshops of Dad, before being shot by the Taliban in October 2012.

Dad led campaigns to protect online freedom of speech in Pakistan as well campaigns against legislation that gives the government broad powers of surveillance online, most notable one is the controversial Prevention of Electronic Crimes Bill 2015. She also contributed in the draft of Acid Prevention Law 2010 and the Domestic Violence Bill of Pakistan.

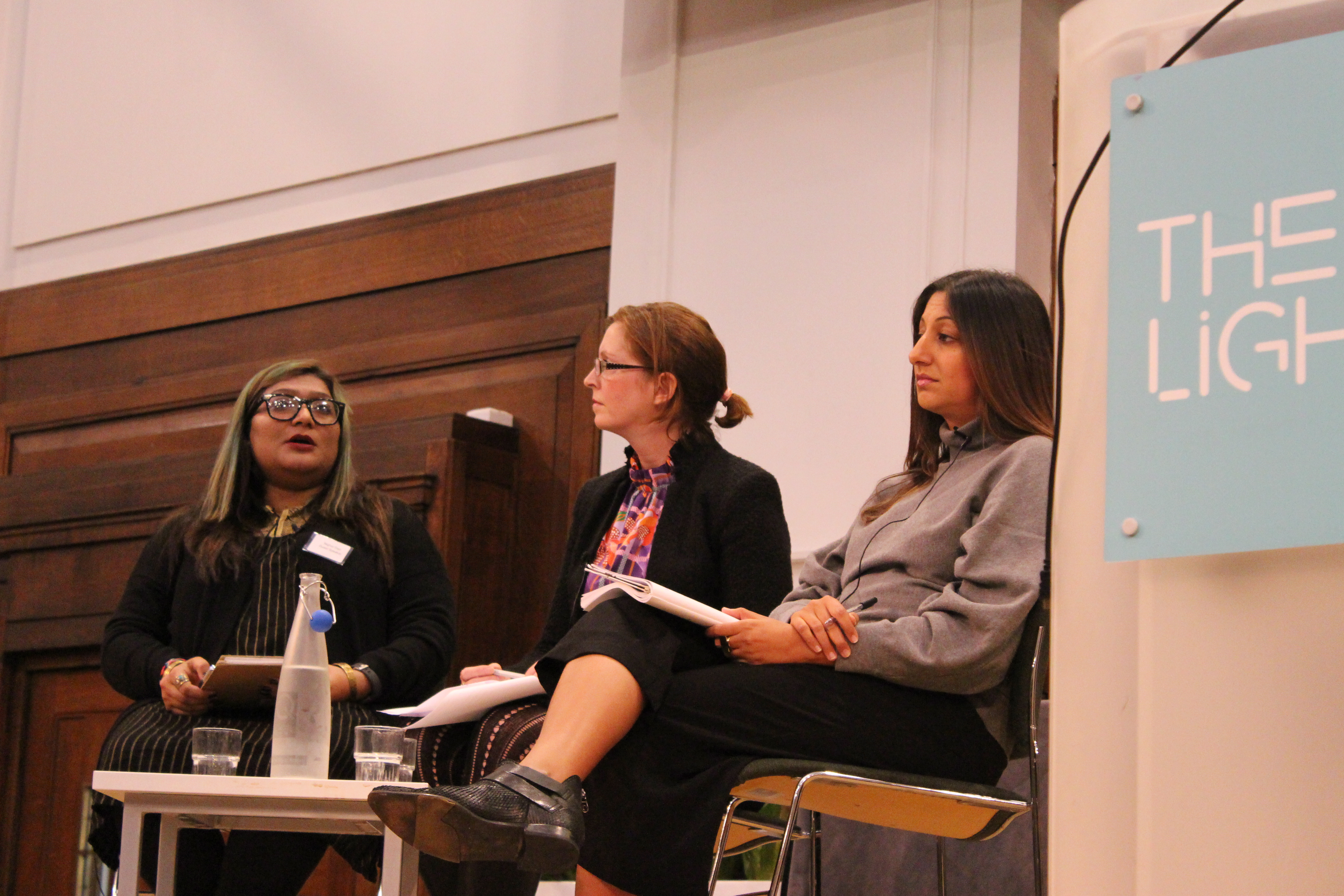
At the Open Rights Group Conference in November 2017. Board members Nighat Dad and Maria Farrell with aspiring board member Azmina Dhrodia

In 2015, she was named in the TIME magazine's list of Next Generation Leaders, for helping Pakistani women fight online harassment.

In 2016, she was awarded the Atlantic Council Digital Freedom Award and Dutch government's Human Rights Tulip award. She is also one of the 25 leading figures on the Information and Democracy Commission launched by Reporters Without Borders.

Since 2018, she has been a lawyer in Ali Zafar vs. Meesha Shafi case, representing Shafi.

In November 2018 she joined The Tor Project's board of directors.

On 6 May 2020, Facebook appointed her to its content oversight board.

In 2023, Nighat Dad was made a member of the UNSG's new AI Advisory Board.

== See also ==
- Internet censorship in Pakistan
