= China Audio-Video Copyright Association =

The China Audio-Video Copyright Association (CAVCA) (Chinese: 中国音像著作权集体管理协会) is the only association of its kind approved by the National Copyright Administration. The association undertakes collective rights management for copyright and related rights in video and audio works.

The rights managed by the association cover the right of performance, right of broadcasting, right of leasing, right of Internet broadcasting, right of duplication and distribution and also copyrights of video & audio works fit for collective management.

The association mainly engages in the registration and management of members and music and TV works, collecting copyright fees from users according to laws and giving out licenses, allocating copyright fees to rights owners based on the usage of their works, making legal representations on illegal use of music and TV works, publicity on collective management of copyrights, being responsible for fee collection with the authorization of National Copyright Administration, and managing and exercising the copyrights of overseas music and TV works on the mainland of China on behalf of foreign counterparts after signing relevant agreements.

== Karaoke Copyright Operation Center ==
The Karaoke Copyright Operation Center is the executive agency of CAVCA. The center is the only agency authorized by Music Copyright Society of China (MCSC) to collect copyright fees from karaoke lounges and is responsible for detailed work related to the Karaoke industry, such as the production and release of music pools, rights protection, publicity, licensing, inspection, fee collection and negotiations.

On October 31, 2018, 6,609 music videos to be taken down from the list in Chinese Karaoke system has hit the headline of China's media recently.

== See also ==
- Intellectual property in China
- Music copyright infringement in the People's Republic of China
- Music Copyright Society of China
