= China International Copyright Expo =

Annual Chinese forum on intellectual property rights

China International Copyright Expo is an annual event that brings companies and organizations, both governmental and independent, to China to discuss various aspects of copyright and intellectual property rights (IPR). The Expo was first held in 2008 and was attended by experts and organizations from countries such as the United States, the United Kingdom, Germany, Japan, South Korea, and many more. The Expo "actively builds an international copyright trade platform, which is focused on industry exchange and trade, consisting of four parts: International Copyright Forum, Industrial Exhibition, Thematic Activities, and Cultural Performance Activities."

== Organizers ==
The China International Copyright Expo is held annually in the National Convention Center in the Olympic Green located just outside the North 4th Ring Road in Beijing. It consists of four major sections, namely: International Copyright Forum, Industrial Exhibition, Thematic Activities, and Cultural Performance.

The Expo is hosted by the following: General Administration of Press and Publication, National Copyright Administration, China Council for the Promotion of International Trade, and Beijing People's Government.

It is operated by the Beijing Copyright Bureau and the Beijing Chaoyang District People's Government. It is implemented by Beijing International Copyright Trade Center.

== 1st China International Copyright Expo ==
In its first year, the China International Copyright Expo was held in the large banquet hall of the Ritz Carlton Hotel in Beijing. In addition to the organizations listed above, it was also sponsored by the World Intellectual Property Organization (WIPO). Mr. Francis Gurry, Director General of WIPO dubbed the event the "Copyright Olympics."

=== International Copyright Forum ===
The International Copyright Forum with the theme of Copyright Creates Fortune was sponsored by The National Copyright Administration of the People's Republic of China and the World Intellectual Property Organization, organized by China Press and Publishing Journal and Beijing International Copyright Trade Center. The objective of the forum was to look at global trends and enhance communication between the cultural creative market in China and the rest of the world. Michael Keplinger, Deputy Director General of the WIPO was the keynote speaker.

=== Thematic Activities ===
There were five main thematic activities at the 1st China International Expo. All the activities were primarily sponsored by the organizing committee of the China International Copyright Expo.

1. Moving China 2008 photography exhibition, which was co-sponsored by the China Photographers Association (中国摄影家协会) and China Photography Copyright Association. The event was co-organized by Chinese Photography journal, China Photography News, Beijing News and The First. There were awards given for various categories of photography and an opportunity for photographers to meet with other industry leaders in the cultural creative market.
2. Original Internet Literature, which included an awarding ceremony for excellence in original internet literature. Although the Expo is called International, this activity was only for the domestic market, thus was limited in scope. The popular Chinese website www.qidian.com was a participant in this event. The goal of this event was to bring attention to those writing on the internet, with the intention of bringing these authors and traditional publishers together. It is unclear from the literature available post-expo if this objective was achieved.
3. China Advertisement Creativity Rights Protection Union establishment ceremony for was held. This was essentially a marketing tool for the participating members to show participants of the expo that they (China Association of National Advertisers, Intellectual Property Committee of All China Lawyers Association, Beijing International Copyright Trade Center, Jincheng & Tongda Law Firm, and Research Department of CTR Market) are serious about changing the status quo of creative rights and protection within the advertising industry in China.
4. Copyright Project Recommendation & Investment Negotiation Fair was co-organized by the China Intercontinental Communication Center and Preparatory Committee of Asian Animation & Comics Contest. The object of this activity was to invite those in the documentary and cartoon film industry, script writers, and other interested parties such as producers, from both the domestic and foreign markets, to be joined with those interested in investment into such activities. Furthermore, the promotion of the Chinese domestic industry to cooperate with foreign members of the industry to help the Chinese industry better export their creativity.
5. Comic Dialogue Over A Century Review Exhibition' was sponsored by the Chinese Ballad Singers Association' and co-organized by the Images Copyright Society of China. The objective of this activity was to promote the history and evolution of Chinese comic dialogue, introducing it to the foreign participants of the expo.

== 2nd China International Copyright Expo ==
The 2nd China International Copyright Expo, October 24–27, 2009, was held at the China National Convention Center (a.k.a. Olympic Green Convention Center) in the Olympic Park, Beijing. There were 11 exhibition zones in all and the exhibition products came from across the cultural creative industry, including: film and television, music, photography, creative cultural, animation, and games. The material supplied by the Beijing International Copyright Trade Center, the organization that executed the event, states that there were, "about 100 project agreements" signed "and financing capital reached more than 100 million RMB."

=== International Copyright Forum ===
The International Copyright Forum was kicked off with a speech by the vice-chairman of the Committee of the National People's Congress, Lu Yongxiang, which was followed by the keynote address titled, Copyright Influences the World by the Director of General Administration of Publication and Press, Liu Binjie. In this address Mr. Liu discussed the impacts, especially economic impacts, that the cultural creative industry has had on the world market, and in particular how China has put great focus on this market in recent years.

This was followed by talks by the Vice-Secretary General of WIPO, Ms. Wang Bin-ying; the influential Chinese economist, professor Li Yi-ning (厉以宁); noted cultural creative industry scholar, Mr. John Howkins; Vice-Minister of the General Administration of Press and Publication and the National Copyright Administration of China, Yan Xiao-long; Deputy Director General of Copyright Management Department of the National Copyright Administration of China, Mr. Xu Chao; the vice-chairman of the Internet Society of China (中国互联网协会), Gao Lu-lin; the President of the International Publishers Association, Mr. Herman P. Spruijt; the Chairman of China Film Copyright Protection Association, Mr. Zhu Yong-de; The chairman of the Board of Sohu Corporation, Mr. Zhang Chao-yang; President of Asia-Pacific division of the Motion Picture Association of America, Mr. Michael Ellis; Director of the Korean Cultural Service in China, Mr. Kim Ik Kyum; and Asia-Pacific President of the International Federation of the Phonographic Industry Association, Ms. Leong Mayseey.

Finally, a four-person forum was held where Mr. Yang De-an, Vice-chairman of China Publishers Association and China Copyright Association; Mr. Tom Allen, Chairman of the United States Publishers Association; Mr. Simon Juden, CEO of The Publishers Association (UK); and Mr. Li Peng-yin, the vice-director of China Publish Group.

=== Industrial Exhibition ===
The 2nd China International Copyright Expo attracted more than 300 exhibitors from throughout China, and countries such as Korea, Japan, United States, France, Germany, and the UK. Perhaps the most popular booth was hosted by the Country of Honor, Korea. The Korean booth had various cultural performances including music, dancing and Cosplay performance, drawing much attention for all who passed by

=== Thematic Activities ===
In the 2nd China International Copyright Expo the Thematic Activities were expanded and much improved over the 2008 Expo. There were seven activities, most of which were focused on digital media. It seems apparent that the Chinese organizers see the digital market place as a very significant trend and are trying to encourage it domestically and use this expo to expose Chinese products to the international community. All activities were hosted by the Organizing Committee of the China International Copyright Expo with various co-hosts. All activities were executed by Beijing International Copyright Trade Center with various other organizations according to the event.

Thematic activities included:

1. China International Image Culture Festival was hosted by the Organizing Committee of China International Copyright Expo, and executed by Beijing International Copyright Trade Center, Xin Rui Media Visibility Alliance, and Bo Lian Association. The Vice Director of Beijing Municipal Bureau of Copyright, Wang Ye-fei, and the Vice Chairman of Images Copyright Society of China, Wang Zheng-sheng, opened the event with talks mostly concerned with protection of copyright photography in the digital age and some new technology being used to help protect digitized photography. This was the culmination of a photo contest that spanned 3 months, receiving more than 4500 entries, and had three main categories and a "special" category. There were a total of 16 award given to photographers, all of whom were able to show their winning work along with selected other pieces. There was also a forum, China International Photograph and Streaming Media Forum that addressed issues in the Chinese photography and streaming media market including, copyright protection and development trends both in China and abroad.
2. China International Digital Music Festival was hosted by the Organizing Committee of China International Copyright Expo and executed by Beijing International Copyright Trade Center, China Music Copyright Association, China Music and Video Copyright Collective Management Association, and DISC Working Committee of the China Music and Video Association. The keynote address was given by the President of the Copyright Society of China, Shan Ren-gan, followed by a speech by the Deputy-President of the China Audio-Video Copyright Association, Wang Hua-peng. The festival consisted of 2 parts, China International Digital Music Forum and China Digital Musical Annual Grand Event. The Forum consisted primarily of business leaders in the Chinese digital music industry such as the CEO of the Tai He Rye Music Co., Ltd., Song Ke; CEO of the A8 Music Group, Liu Xiao-song; CEO of Rock Mobile, Li Jing; CEO of Sina Music, Xie Guo-min; and CEO of Top 100; Chen Ge. From the international community Xavier Blanc of the Board of Directors of The Societies Council for the Collective Management of Performers' Rights (SCAPR) and Secretary General of AEPO-ARTIS, as well as a representative of JVC, Hidenhiko Koike. The China Digital Musical Annual Grand Event was an award ceremony hosted by well-known Chinese news anchorman Wu Zhou-tong. Awards were given in the categories of China Digital Music: Most Popular Singer, Best Singer, Best Instrumental, Best Music and Lyrics, Best Caller Ring Back Tone (CRBT).
3. China Internet Literature Festival was hosted by the Organizing Committee of China International Copyright Expo, and the China Writers Association, and assisted by China Publication Science Institute, China Literature Copyright Association, SNDA Literature Channel, Long River Literature and Art Publishing House, and People's Literature Publishing House. The festival was also supported by 16 online reading channels such as Sohu reading, Sina reading, and Tencent reading. Opening speeches were given by the Secretary of China Writers Association, Li Bing; Vice Minister of the General Administration of Press and Publication and The National Copyright Administration of China, Yan Xiao-hong; and Director General of China Written Works Copyright Society, Zhang Hong-bo. This event had an awarding ceremony for China Original Online Literature, as well as initializing a national Digital Reading Day. There were also three forums including:
  1. Win-Win Benefits for Both Writers and Literature Websites with Lin Wan-bing, Li Bo, Bai Ye, and Zhang Yi-wu.
  2. The Impacts of Cellphone and Mass Media Literature with Tong Zhi-lei, Wang Bang-jiang, Wei Yu-shan, Xiao Dong-fa, and Liu Yu-xing.
  3. New Forces in Chinese Writing with Zhou Hong-li, Ning Ken, Wang Gan, and Chen Xiao-ming.
4. China Cultural Industry Project Investment and Financing Negotiation was hosted by the Organizing Committee of China International Copyright Expo, and executed by Beijing International Copyright Trade Centerand assisted by BTV, Beijing Xi Duo Rui Culture Broadcasting Co., Ltd. This event was an opportunity for people from the cultural creative industry to meet and propose their projects to producers, distributors, film companies, and investors.
5. China International Digital Entertainment Leadership Summit was hosted by the Organizing Committee of China International Copyright Expo, and executed by Beijing International Copyright Trade Center, IT Times, and IT Business News Network. The theme of the summit was IT Technology Will Promote Innovation and Copyright Protection will Bring Prosperity. The summit had talks from many of the leaders in the Chinese digital entertainment industry and a discussion with Vice-General Manager of CN Live, Zhang Xin-xin; CEO of QH Joy, Sun Ben-sheng; President of Zhidian 3G, Cao Tong; and Chief Editor of News Network of IT Time Weekly, Xiao Ji-ye.
6. China Award Presentation Ceremony for Outstanding Game Producers was hosted by the Organizing Committee of China International Copyright Expoand China International Digital Entertainment Expo Organizing Committee and executed by Beijing International Copyright Trade Centerand Beijing Han Wei Xin Heng Exhibition Co. Ltd. This was the first such event in China with awarding of China's first award for Outstanding Game Producers. The goal of this event was to build a bridge between outstanding game producers and gaming companies.
7. China International Software Copyright Summit Forum was hosted by the Organizing Committee of China International Copyright Expo, and executed by Beijing International Copyright Trade Center, and co-organized by the Internet Society of China, Business Softward Alliance, China Software Alliance, and Beijing Software Industry Association. The theme of the summit was Boosting Awareness of Copyright, Stopping Piracy and Protecting Software Intellectual Property Rights.

=== Cultural Performance ===
There were two cultural performances at the 2nd China International Copyright Expo.

1. Ballerina Who Loves B-boy is one of South Korea's most popular modern cultural performances. The company started in 2005 and has performed on Broadway and the Edinburgh Festival. The story is of how two very different worlds of dance, ballet and hip-hop, come together when a balletrina and a hip-hop dancer fall in love.
2. China Cosplay Competition: Beijing Cosplay has become very popular in Asia, particularly in Japan. This event featured 13 groups, chosen after the original entries that were received by the judges via internet video.

== 3rd China International Copyright Expo ==
The 3rd China International Copyright Expo will be held November 18–21, 2010 at the National Convention Center (the same venue as the 2009 expo), however the schedule has yet to be released.

== See also ==
- Intellectual property in China
