= Fuling jiabing =

Traditional snack food of Beijing

Cakes of Fuling jiabing with packaging

Fuling jiabing (simplified Chinese: 茯苓夹饼; traditional Chinese: 茯苓夾餅; pinyin: Fúlíng jiābǐng), also known Fu Ling Bing or Tuckahoe Pie, is a traditional snack food of Beijing and is an integral part of the city's culture. It is a pancake-like snack made from flour, sugar, and fuling (Poria), rolled around nuts, honey, and other ingredients. The flour can be mixed with fuling (Wolfiporia extensa), a Chinese medicinal fungus native to Yunnan province that is used in TCM to ‘rid the spleen of dampness’. Different ingredients are rolled into the pancakes making a variety of Fuling jiabing. The pancakes can be carved into beautiful patterns, too.

It used to be a light snack served to the royal family or governmental officials in the Qing Dynasty. Now it has become a must-have snack of Beijing. Daoxiangchun (稻香村) is renowned for the excellence of its Fuling jiabing.
