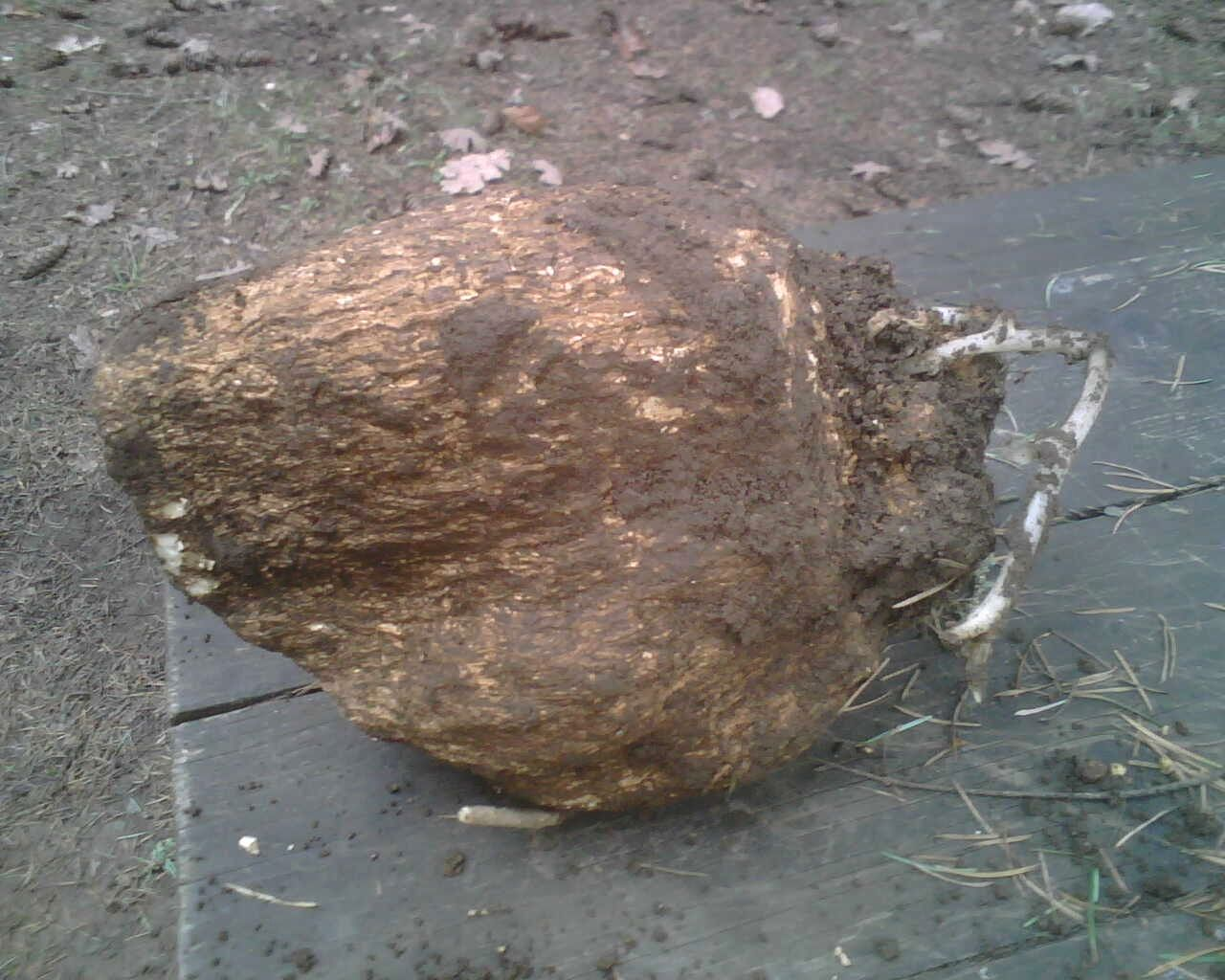
- Wolfiporia extensa sclerotium

Scientific classification
- Kingdom: Fungi
- Division: Basidiomycota
- Class: Agaricomycetes
- Order: Polyporales
- Family: Polyporaceae
- Genus: Wolfiporia
- Species: W. extensa

Binomial name
- Wolfiporia extensa (Peck) Ginns (1984)

Synonyms
- Pachyma cocos Fr. (1822); Sclerotium cocos Schwein. (1822); Daedalea extensa Peck (1891); Poria cocos F.A.Wolf (1922); Macrohyporia cocos (Schwein.) I.Johans. & Ryvarden (1979); Macrohyporia extensa (Peck) Ginns & J.Lowe (1983); Wolfiporia cocos (F.A.Wolf) Ryvarden & Gilb. (1984)

= Wolfiporia extensa =

Species of fungus

Wolfiporia extensa
- Mycological characteristics
- Pores on hymenium
- No distinct cap
- Hymenium attachment is irregular or not applicable
- Lacks a stipe
- Spore print is white
- Ecology is saprotrophic or parasitic
- Edibility is inedible or edible

Wolfiporia extensa (syn. Poria cocos F.A.Wolf), commonly known as hoelen, poria, tuckahoe, China root, fu ling (茯苓, pīnyīn: fúlíng), or matsuhodo, is a species of fungus in the family Polyporaceae. It is a wood-decay fungus but has a subterranean growth habit. It notably develops a large, long-lasting underground sclerotium resembling a small coconut.

== History ==
Compendium of Materia Medica is firstly recorded in Compendium of Materia Medica by Li Shizhen around the 16th century, as one of the first books to record Chinese herbs. The book recorded its medicinal application in adverse urination, edema, spleen deficiency and diarrhea. W. extensa is used extensively as a medicinal mushroom in Chinese medicine. Indications for use in the traditional Chinese medicine include promoting urination, to invigorate the spleen function (i.e., digestive function), and to calm the mind.

== Uses ==
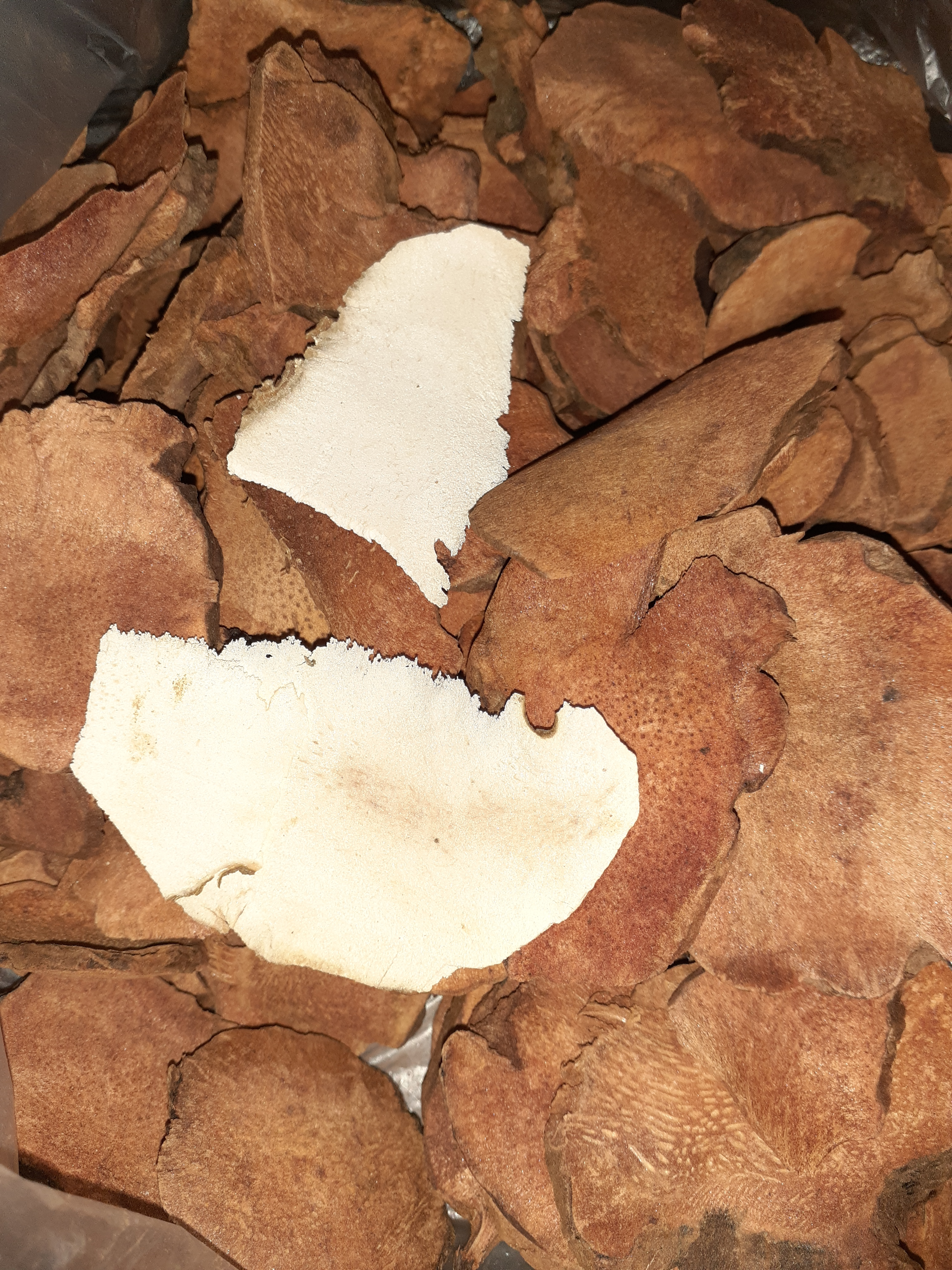
Dried sliced fuling used in Traditional Chinese Medicine

The tubers were reportedly eaten by some Native American tribes. In China, it is used as traditional medicine and to make fuling jiabing, a kind of snack.

=== Botanical extract ===
The species is a source of triterpenoid compounds, pachymic acid, polysaccharides, choline, and histidine which has been the object of scientific study based upon the mushroom's role in traditional Chinese medicine.

=== Medicinal uses ===
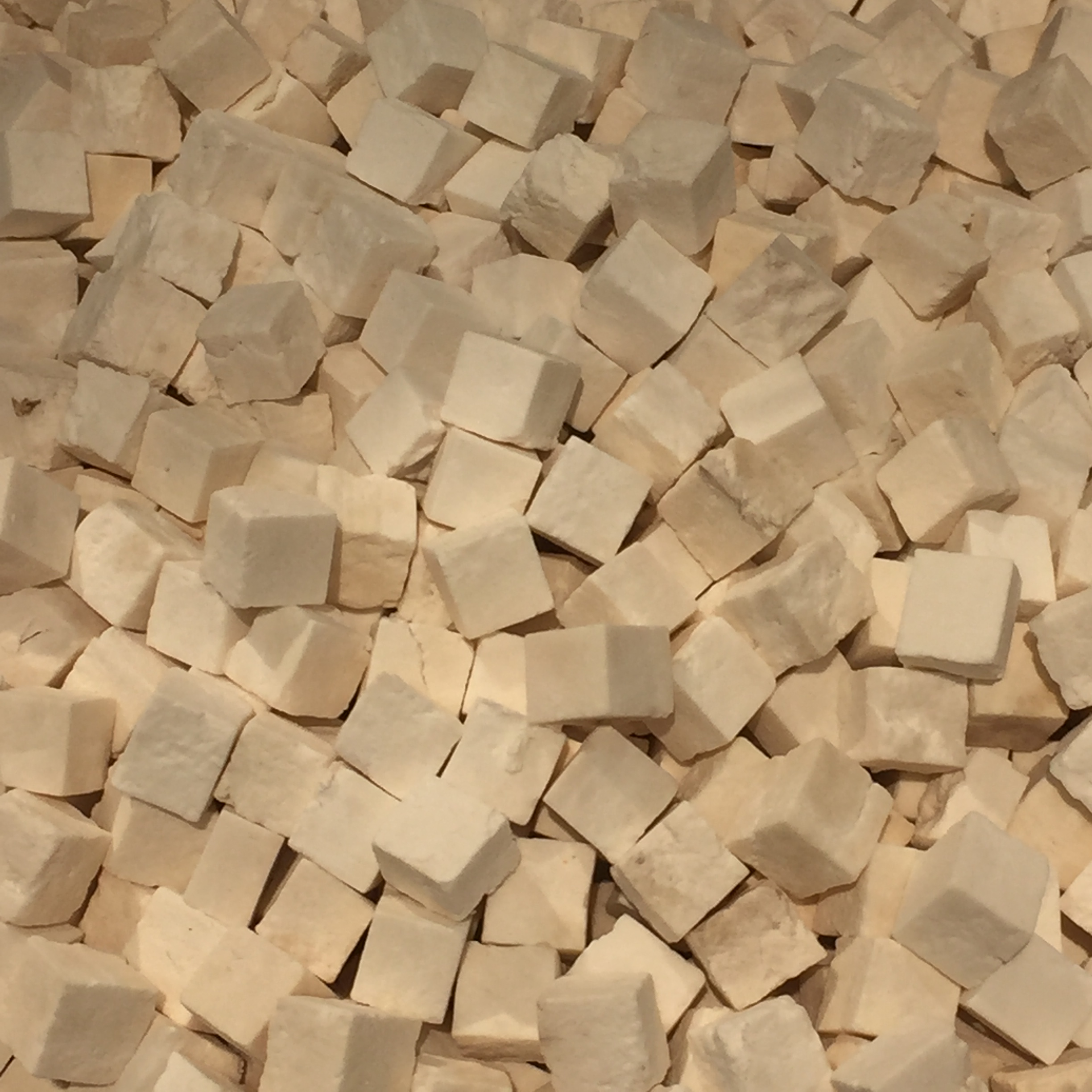
Dried fuling in cube form

The polysaccharides of W. extensa and their derivatives have garnered significant interest due to their wide range of biological activities. These compounds exhibit potent anticancer, anti-inflammatory, antioxidant, and antiviral effects, which indicate their potential for further development as therapy or adjuvant therapy for cancer, immune modulation, and viral diseases.

Besides, some polysaccharides have been found to possess antidepressant effects and have the ability to suppress the proliferation of T and B cells. Preliminary research indicates a potential for these polysaccharides in the development of antidepressant or immunosuppressive agents in the food and pharmaceutical industries.

Its main ingredients, triterpenoid compounds, exhibit significant pharmacological properties such as anti-diabetic and tonic medicine. Particularly, specific components like pachymic acid, 3-epidehydrotumulosic acid, and polyporenic acid C have been shown to significantly increase hypoglycemic activity, which is traditionally used in treating hyperglycemic disorders like diabetes.

In addition, triterpenoids from W. extensa have been also found to demonstrate significant diuretic activity in rats. Specifically, tetracyclic triterpenoids from W. extensa are aldosterone antagonists that can bind to renal cytoplasmic aldosterone receptors. This action enhances the urinary Na^{+}/K^{+} ratio in rats and inhibits the Na^{+}-K^{+} ATPase in the kidney and erythrocytes, which reduce the reabsorption of crude urine, leading to increased urine excretion, as diuresis application.

A novel immunomodulatory glycoprotein from W. extensa is demonstrated to be capable of activating murine macrophages, cells that play a crucial role in the body's defense against diseases, such as bacterial infections and tumor cells involved in tumor lysis and growth inhibition. This suggests its immunomodulatory effects as a herbal remedy.

Modern pharmacological studies suggest multiple neurological benefits associated with the use of W. extensa. For instance, the aqueous extract has been found to improve long-term potentiation in the hippocampus of rats and ameliorate scopolamine-induced spatial memory impairment. Furthermore, it is a key ingredient in many traditional Chinese medicinal formulas used to manage neurodegenerative diseases.

In Chinese medicine, W. extensa is commonly used for the treatment of primary dysmenorrhea. It is known for its clinical efficacy in activating blood circulation to dissipate blood stasis.
