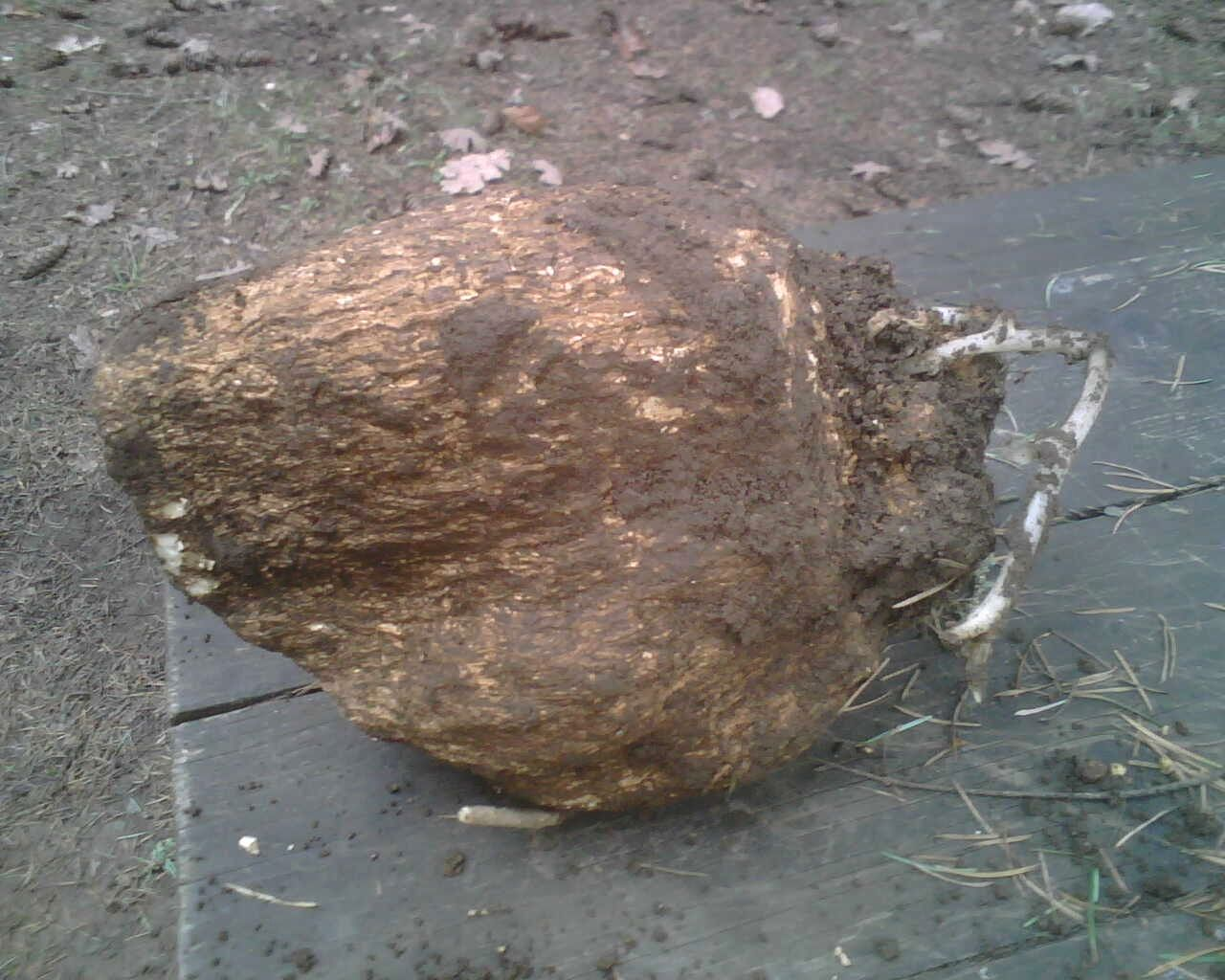
- Sclerotium of Wolfiporia extensa

Scientific classification
- Domain: Eukaryota
- Kingdom: Fungi
- Division: Basidiomycota
- Class: Agaricomycetes
- Order: Polyporales
- Family: Polyporaceae
- Genus: Wolfiporia; Ryvarden & Gilb. (1984)

Type species
- Wolfiporia cocos (F.A.Wolf) Ryvarden & Gilb. (1984)

= Wolfiporia =

Genus of fungi

Wolfiporia is a genus of fungi in the family Polyporaceae. The genus was circumscribed by Leif Ryvarden and Robert Lee Gilbertson in 1984 to contain the type species Wolfiporia cocos (now known as Wolfiporia extensa) and W. dilatohypha. The genus is named in honor of mycologist Frederick Adolph Wolf, who was the first to officially describe the type species.

== Species list ==
- Wolfiporia cartilaginea Ryvarden (1986)
- Wolfiporia castanopsis Y.C.Dai (2011)
- Wolfiporia curvispora Y.C.Dai (1998)
- Wolfiporia dilatohypha Ryvarden & Gilb. (1984)
- Wolfiporia extensa (synonym for Wolfiporia cocos)
- Wolfiporia sulphurea (Burt) Ginns (1984)
