= Music Copyright Society of China =

Organization

The Music Copyright Society of China (MCSC; 中国音乐著作权协会) is the country's only officially recognized organization for music copyright administration and has issued copyrights for over 14 million music works for approximately 8,000 members.

Founded in 1992, the Music Copyright Society of China is the only collective rights management organization for copyright in China, with ties to over 30 foreign music copyright protection organizations including the Irish Music Rights Organisation, the National Music Publishers' Association in the United States, and PRS for Music in the United Kingdom.

== See also ==
- Intellectual property in the People's Republic of China
- Music copyright infringement in the People's Republic of China
- China Audio-Video Copyright Association
