= Wolfiporia dilatohypha =

Scientific classification
- Domain: Eukaryota
- Kingdom: Fungi
- Division: Basidiomycota
- Class: Agaricomycetes
- Order: Polyporales
- Family: Polyporaceae
- Genus: Wolfiporia
- Species: W. dilatohypha

Binomial name
- Wolfiporia dilatohypha Ryvarden & Gilb. (1984)

Species of fungus

Wolfiporia dilatohypha is a species of fungus in the order Polyporales. Although it was first described as Poria inflata by Lee Oras Overholts, he neglected to include a Latin description of the species, (then required by the International Code of Nomenclature for algae, fungi, and plants), and so the name was not validly published. Mycologists Leif Ryvarden and Robert Lee Gilbertson published the species validly in 1984 in a revision of Overholts' work. The type collection was made in Oxford, Ohio in 1911.
