= Gilbertsonia =

Scientific classification
- Kingdom: Fungi
- Division: Basidiomycota
- Class: Agaricomycetes
- Order: Polyporales
- Family: Fomitopsidaceae
- Genus: Gilbertsonia; Parmasto (2001)

Type species
- Gilbertsonia angulipora (M.J.Larsen & Lombard) Parmasto (2001)

Synonyms
- Fibroporia angulopora M.J.Larsen & Lombard (1983); Oligoporus anguloporus (M.J.Larsen & Lombard) Gilb. & Ryvarden (1985); Postia angulopora (M.J.Larsen & Lombard) M.J.Larsen & Lombard (1986)

Genus of fungi

Gilbertsonia is a fungal genus in the family Fomitopsidaceae. This is a monotypic genus, containing the single brown rot species Gilbertsonia angulipora, found in the United States. Gilbertsonia is characterized by a dimitic hypha system with clamped generative and well-developed binding hyphae. The generic name honors mycologist Robert Lee Gilbertson (1925 – 2011).

The genus was circumscribed by Erast Parmasto in Harvard Pap. Bot. Vol.6 on page 179 in 2001.
