= Wolfiporia castanopsis =

Scientific classification
- Domain: Eukaryota
- Kingdom: Fungi
- Division: Basidiomycota
- Class: Agaricomycetes
- Order: Polyporales
- Family: Polyporaceae
- Genus: Wolfiporia
- Species: W. castanopsis

Binomial name
- Wolfiporia castanopsis Y.C.Dai (2011)

Species of fungus

Wolfiporia castanopsis is a species of wood-decay fungus in the order Polyporales. It is found in Yunnan, China, where it grows on the rotten wood of Castanopsis orthacantha. The type locality was the Zixishan Nature Reserve in Chuxiong. The fungus, described as new to science in 2011 by mycologist Yu-Cheng Dai, is named for the tree with which it associates.
