= Wolfiporia cartilaginea =

Scientific classification
- Domain: Eukaryota
- Kingdom: Fungi
- Division: Basidiomycota
- Class: Agaricomycetes
- Order: Polyporales
- Family: Polyporaceae
- Genus: Wolfiporia
- Species: W. cartilaginea

Binomial name
- Wolfiporia cartilaginea Ryvarden (1986)

Species of fungus

Wolfiporia cartilaginea is a species of fungus in the order Polyporales. Found in northeastern China, it was described as new to science by Norwegian mycologist Leif Ryvarden in 1986. The type locality was the Changbaishan National Nature Reserve in Jilin province. Fruitbodies of the fungus are resupinate, with tiny pores measuring 3–4 per millimetre. The ellipsoidal spores are hyaline (translucent), non-amyloid, and measure 4–5 by 2–2.5 μm.
