= Pachymic acid =

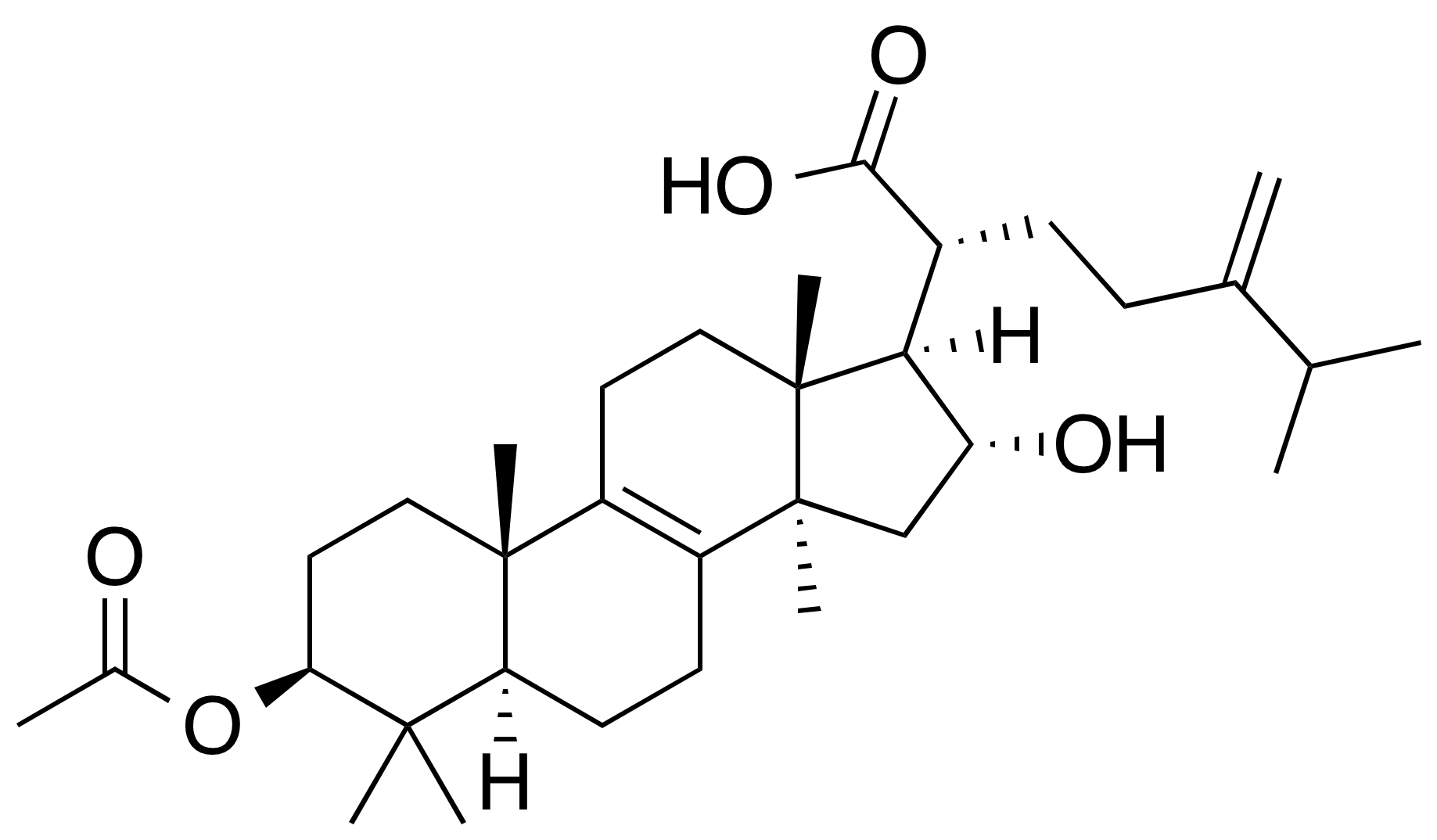

Names
- IUPAC name 3β-(Acetyloxy)-16α-hydroxy-24-methylidenelanost-8-en-21-oic acid
- Systematic IUPAC name (2R)-2-[(1R,2R,3aR,5aR,6S,9aS,11aR)-7-(Acetyloxy)-2-hydroxy-3a,6,6,9a,11a-pentamethyl-2,3,3a,4,5,5a,6,7,8,9,9a,10,11,11a-tetradecahydro-1H-cyclopenta[a]phenanthren-1-yl]-6-methyl-5-methylideneheptanoic acid

Identifiers
CAS Number	29070-92-6
3D model (JSmol)	Interactive image
ChEMBL	ChEMBL468034
ChemSpider	280037
KEGG	C17044
PubChem CID	5484385
UNII	X2FCK16QAH
CompTox Dashboard (EPA)	DTXSID10951675
- InChI: InChI=1S/C20H32O4/c1-2-3-4-5-6-7-8-9-10-11-12-13-14-16-19(24-23)17-15-18-20(21)22/h6-7,9-10,12-14,16,19,23H,2-5,8,11,15,17-18H2,1H3,(H,21,22)/b7-6-,10-9-,13-12-,16-14+ Key: JNUUNUQHXIOFDA-XTDASVJISA-N; InChI=1S/C33H52O5/c1-19(2)20(3)10-11-22(29(36)37)28-25(35)18-33(9)24-12-13-26-30(5,6)27(38-21(4)34)15-16-31(26,7)23(24)14-17-32(28,33)8/h19,22,25-28,35H,3,10-18H2,1-2,4-9H3,(H,36,37)/t22-,25-,26+,27+,28+,31-,32-,33+/m1/s1 Key: VDYCLYGKCGVBHN-DRCQUEPLSA-N
- SMILES: CC(C)C(=C)CC[C@H]([C@H]1[C@@H](C[C@@]2([C@@]1(CCC3=C2CC[C@@H]4[C@@]3(CC[C@@H](C4(C)C)OC(=O)C)C)C)C)O)C(=O)O

Properties
Chemical formula	C_{33}H_{52}O_{5}
Molar mass	528.76 g/mol
Density	1.1±0.1 g/cm3
Boiling point	612.2±55.0 °C at 760 mmHg

Hazards
Flash point	184.7±25.0 °C
- Except where otherwise noted, data are given for materials in their standard state (at 25 °C [77 °F], 100 kPa). verify (what is ?) Infobox references

Pachymic acid is a naturally occurring steroid that can be extracted from the parasitic fungus Wolfiporia extensa (synonym Wolfiporia cocos). The dried sclerotia of the fungus is used as a traditional Chinese medicine, and pachymic acid is thought to be the principal bioactive component of it. Pachymic acid is a white powder that is not absorbed well by the body due the poor solubility it has in water.

== Effects ==
Pachymic acid is known to inhibit the Epstein–Barr virus and to inhibit the snake venom phospholipase A2. It also has antitumor and anti-inflammatory properties. Pachymic acid anti-tumor properties are due to the cytotoxic effects it has on the tumors making them less viable and proliferate less. Various cancer cells can have their cell growth stopped and undergo apotosis, however the exact mechanism is not known.
