= Wolfiporia curvispora =

Scientific classification
- Domain: Eukaryota
- Kingdom: Fungi
- Division: Basidiomycota
- Class: Agaricomycetes
- Order: Polyporales
- Family: Polyporaceae
- Genus: Wolfiporia
- Species: W. curvispora

Binomial name
- Wolfiporia curvispora Y.C.Dai (1998)
- Known only from Jilin, China

Species of fungus

Wolfiporia curvispora is a species of fungus in the order Polyporales. It is found in Jilin, China, where it grows on the rotting wood of Pinus koraiensis. The fungus was described as new to science in 1998 by mycologist Yu-Cheng Dai. The fruitbodies of the fungus are resupinate, meaning they lie flat on the substrate, and have dimensions of up to 3 metres (10 ft) long by 70 cm (28 in) wide by 1 centimetre (0.4 in) thick. They are creamy white (buff when dry), soft, and light. The hyphal system is dimitic, comprising generative and skeletal hyphae. The specific epithet curvispora refers to the curved spores.
