= Beijing Daoxiangcun v. Beijing Sudao Food Industry Co., and Suzhou Daoxiangcun =

Trademark litigation case in China

- Court: Beijing Intellectual Property Court
- Full case name: Beijing Daoxiang Village Food Co., Ltd. v. Beijing Sudao Food Industry Co., Ltd., and Suzhou Daoxiang Village Food Co., Ltd., (2015) Jing Zhimin Chu Zi No. 1606
- Decided: xxx
- Citations: （2015）京知民初字第1606号 (pinyin: (2015) Jing Zhimin Chu Zi No. 1606)

Beijing Daoxiang Village Food Co., Ltd. ("Beijing Daoxiang") v. Beijing Sudao Food Industry Co., Ltd., and Suzhou Daoxiang Village Food Co., Ltd., (both together "Suzhou Daoxiang") (2015) Jing Zhimin Chu Zi No. 1606 is a trademark litigation case in China involving the name of a very popular brand of moon cake and highlights the criteria applied by Chinese courts to interim injunctions. The Beijing Intellectual Property Court ordered an injunction near the time of China's Mid-Autumn Festival which is the only time of the year in which mooncakes are sold.

== Background ==
The two parties are pastry companies based in different parts of China. Suzhou Daoxiang is based in Jiangsu and has been operating since 1773. Beijing Daoxiang is based in Beijing and has been operating since 1895. Both companies have long produced moon cakes branded as Daoxiangcun (稻香村, “village with fragrant rice paddies”) and both have registered the term as a trademark, in different product categories - Suzhou Daoxiang in 1982 and Beijing Daoxiang in 1997. Because of increased use of e-commerce, the two companies have come into increasingly direct competition with one another.

In 2006, Suzhou Daoxiang applied to the State Administration for Industry and Commerce (SAIC) to register a trademark including the phrase Daoxiangcun. Beijing Daoxiang objected and their position was upheld by the SAIC's review board in 2013 and by the Beijing High Court in 2014. Suzhou Daoxiang continued to use the trademark, so Beijing Daoxiang filed a case in the Beijing Intellectual Property Court.

== Preliminary Injunction ==
On 22 September 2017, a judicial panel consisting of Zhang Xiaojin, Cui Ning and Liu Yijun granted an interim injunction because the applicant was urgently facing irreparable damage. The court stated that:

...[I]f the relevant behavioral preservation measures are not taken, it will cause irreparable damage to the lawful rights and interests of the applicants, that is, the judgment of the irreparable damage and the urgency of the behavior preservation measures. In view of the current Mid-Autumn Festival and National Day holiday, traditional cakes and other commodities are in the peak season of sales, the sales volume of the infringed goods such as moon cakes and other cakes will increase significantly, and the market share of the applicants will be quickly seized, thus greatly reducing their interests. Therefore, if the respondent is not ordered to immediately stop the case, it will have a serious impact on the applicant's market share and will cause irreparable damage to its interests. The damage will be greater than the respondent's Beijing Sudao Company and Suzhou. Daoxiangcun Company stopped the damage caused by the act of the case.

On 26 September 2017, in response to the preliminary injunction, the defendant placed a counter-guarantee of RMB 60 million in cash, which was twice as much as the guarantee placed by the plaintiff and requested the court to lift the injunction. Due to the counter-guarantee, the short shelf-life of mooncakes, the short season in which mooncakes can be sold, the likelihood that the defendant would suffer huge losses if the mooncakes that had already been produced were not permitted for sale, and that the applicant could be compensated by money since the counter-guarantee placed by the defendant was sufficient to cover all of the applicant's claims, the court lifted the injunction.

== Outcome ==
Suzhou Daoxiang was ordered to stop using the trademarks and to pay RMB 30 million in damages to Beijing Daoxiang.

== See also ==
- Intellectual property in China
