= Beijing Intellectual Property Court =

Special Jurisdiction Court in China

Beijing Intellectual Property Court 北京知识产权法院 Běijīng zhīshì chǎnquán fǎyuàn
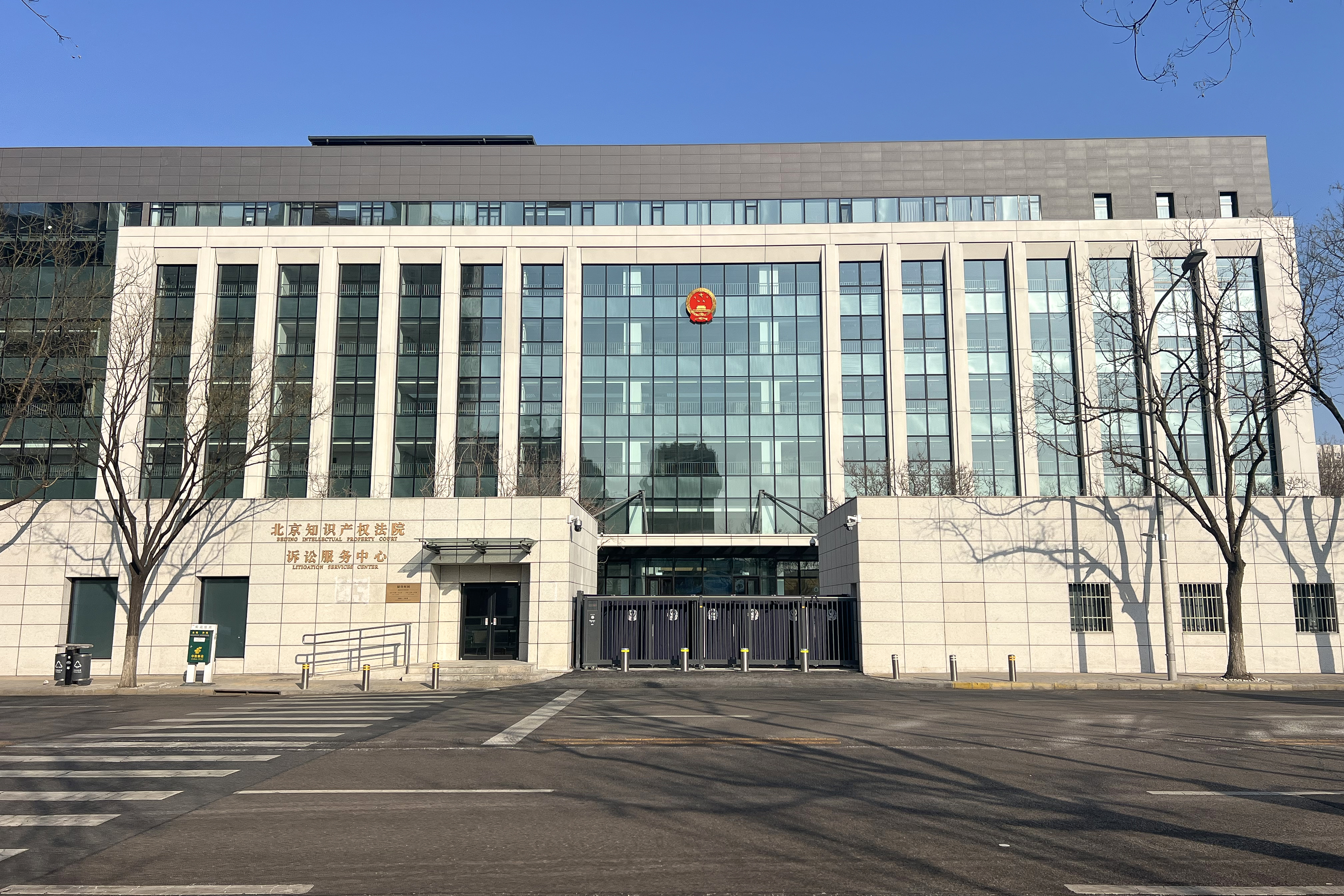
- Courthouse of the Beijing IP court
- Established: 31 August 2014
- Jurisdiction: Intellectual property in China
- Location: 9 West 3rd Ring Rd (South), Beijing, China
- Appeals to: Supreme People's Court
- Website: Beijing IP Court

President
- Currently: Su Chi

The Beijing Intellectual Property Court (Chinese: 北京知识产权法院; pinyin: Běijīng zhīshì chǎnquán fǎyuàn) is a Court of special jurisdiction in the People's Republic of China, which handles: "first-instance IP civil or administrative cases with professional features involving patents, new varieties of plants, layout design of integrated circuit, know-how and so on." There are similar courts based in Shanghai and Guangzhou.

== History ==
The Beijing IP Court was created at the same time as other courts in China by way of the Decision of the Standing Committee of the National People's Congress on the Establishment of IP Courts in Beijing, Shanghai and Guangzhou, which was adopted at the 10th session of the 12th Standing Committee of the National People's Congress on 31 August 2014.

The Beijing IP Court closed 5,432 cases in 2015 and 8,111 cases in 2016.

== Functions ==
The Beijing IP court generally has the same functions as the other intermediate IP courts, which include:

1. Adjudicating over intellectual property infringement disputes.
2. Complex disputes involving technology, computer software, plant varieties and integrated circuit designs.
3. Complex disputes involving trade secrets.
4. Appeals from basic courts on copyright and trademark disputes.
5. Administrative appeals relating to the validity of trademarks and patents.
6. Unfair competition disputes.

However, the geographic territory covered by the Beijing IP Court also includes the offices of the Trademark Review and Adjudication Board, and the Patent Reexamination Board of CNIPA. This means that administrative appeals from CBIPA boards are made to the Beijing IP Court.

Appeals from the Beijing IP Court are to the Supreme People's Court. Beginning in 2019, those appeals go to a specialized IP tribunal within the Supreme People's Court, which is the exclusive appellate venue in China for technology-related IP lawsuits.

== Judges ==
- Su Chi
- Yang Jing

== Use of precedent ==
China has a civil law system. This means that laws can only be created by the legislature not the courts. Hence, there is no case law in China. However, the Beijing Intellectual Property Court has been trialing a "Case Guidance System" (案例指导制度 ànlì zhǐdǎo zhìdù). While not legally binding, these cases can be considered a type of persuasive precedent. Such cases are used in the following manner:

...For each disputed focus of the case, no more than three cases are submitted; the case should be accompanied by a summary indicating the source of the case, its effective status, and the case in question. Comparison of key facts and similarities, referee rules or methods and standards contained in the case, the referee rules or methods and standards for the inspiration and guidance of the case under trial and its specific reasons. The case summary generally does not exceed 800 words, and the case and its abstracts, reference opinions, etc. can be submitted as an attachment to the complaint and the reply.

== Notable cases ==
- Sogou v. Baidu (2015) Jing Zhi Min Chu No.’s 01731, 01732 and 01943: This is the first case in China where the court issued a partial judgement and also the first case to involve software patent infringement.
- IWINNComm v. Sony: This case involved a standard essential patent and the first fair, reasonable, and non-discriminatory licensing (FRAND) injunction in China.
- Beijing Daoxiangcun v. Beijing Sudao Food Industry Co., and Suzhou Daoxiangcun (2015).
- Silvain v. Ye (2021): Chinese artist Ye Yongqing was accused of plagiarism by Belgian artist Christian Silvain. A verdict delivered on 24 August 2023 awarded €650,000 ($696,000) in damages to Silvain, the highest amount so far for cases related to fine arts in China.

== See also ==
- Court system of the People's Republic of China
