= Wolfiporia sulphurea =

Scientific classification
- Domain: Eukaryota
- Kingdom: Fungi
- Division: Basidiomycota
- Class: Agaricomycetes
- Order: Polyporales
- Family: Polyporaceae
- Genus: Wolfiporia
- Species: W. sulphurea

Binomial name
- Wolfiporia sulphurea (Burt) Ginns (1984)

Synonyms
- Merulius sulphureus Burt (1917); Byssomerulius sulphureus (Burt) Lindsey (1974); Macrohyporia sulphurea (Burt) Ginns & J.Lowe (1983); Meruliopsis sulphurea (Burt) Ginns & M.N.L.Lefebvre [as 'sulphureus'] (1993)

Species of fungus

Wolfiporia sulphurea is a species of fungus in the family Polyporaceae. First described in 1917 as Merulius sulphureus by Edward Angus Burt, it was transferred to the genus Wolfiporia by James Herbert Ginns in 1984.
