= Music copyright infringement in China =

Today music copyright is enforced in China. According to the International Federation of the Phonographic Industry 97% Chinese consumers were listening to licensed music in 2021. In 2018 the rate was 96% of Chinese, which was a much higher amount than the global average of 62%.

In 2008, rates of music copyright infringement in China were widely regarded as among the highest in the world. Some reports from the International Federation of the Phonographic Industry said, that about 95 percent or higher of music sales in China were unauthorized, most coming from downloads of copyrighted music on the Internet.

Some record stores sold unauthorized copies of artists’ music for as little as $4. This had been hard on international and Chinese record industries such as the Music Copyright Society of China, with revenues dropping 90 percent and new release sales falling about 50 percent since 2005. There were also Chinese-based peer-to-peer services assisting in large-scale illegal file-sharing, according to the IFPI. In 2005, the IFPI reported more than 350 million unauthorized discs were sold and the physical copyright infringement value totalled about $410 million. Most of these illegal sites or services offer songs for free, generating income from advertising and other services.

== Changing Chinese copyright law ==
Laws governing intellectual property in China have been in place since 1979 with varying levels of success. With a large amount of copyright infringement online during the past decade, China's supreme governing body, the State Council of the People's Republic of China, has introduced streamlined regulations, effective July 1, 2007 that clarifies China's copyright law regarding the liability of content and service providers involved in the distribution of unauthorized content.

In the 21st century, the Chinese government has tried to diminish online copyright violation. In 2006, a memorandum of understanding with a number of media industry associations to help fight unauthorized distribution and protect online copyright was signed. This was after the infringement rate of software in China reached 86 percent.

In April 2007, the United States government filed action against China with the World Trade Organization for violating intellectual property rights. The suit was brought because it was believed the Chinese government was not acting against copyright infringement as a criminal offense.

== Current lawsuits ==
On April 7, 2007, Beijing's No. 1 Intermediate People's Court made the decision to allow suits to be brought against two of China's leading search engines, Baidu and Sogou. Sogou is the music service of the Web portal Sohu. The International Federation of the Phonographic Industry will represent Universal Music, Sony BMG Music Entertainment (Hong Kong) and Warner Music Hong Kong in a suit against Baidu. Gold Label Entertainment Ltd., backed by EMI Group Ltd., is also bringing a suit against Sogou as well.

The music-industry lawsuits claim $9 million in damages against Baidu and $7.5 million against Sogou. The lawsuit against Baidu is based on 127 copyright music tracks, which are just a small representative sample of the wider infringement. They seek the maximum statutory compensation under Chinese law of $71,000 per track, or about $9 million total. A victory for the plaintiffs could set a precedent in not only China but worldwide when it comes to "deep-linking" files online.

As record industry numbers have fallen, Baidu's revenue doubled in 2007 to $239 million, which comes mostly from online advertising.

== Lawsuits ==
Over time, trademarks, patents, and lawsuits involving intellectual property are growing in China.

The IFPI has filed about 300 lawsuits in Chinese courts and have been victorious in about 90 percent of them. In April 2007, a court ruled that Yahoo! China's MP3 search service enabled copyright infringement of music, which still has not been thoroughly enforced and may be in the process of more litigation. The IFPI lost a similar case months earlier against Baidu when a Beijing court accepted the company's argument that it's simply providing a link to third-party content.

Baidu leads the Chinese search engine market. Reports show that 70–75 percent of search engine traffic is through Baidu, and many see the ability to find and copy music through Baidu as a reason. Google has recently partnered with the Yao Ming-founded online music provider Top100.cn to make some headway in the Chinese market.

== See also ==
- Criticism of intellectual property
