= Association of European Performers' Organisations =

European association of music organisations

- Abbreviation: AEPO-ARTIS
- Formation: 1994
- Headquarters: Brussels
- Location: Belgium
- Official language: english
- Website: http://aepo-artis.org/

The Association of European Performers' Organisations (AEPO-ARTIS) unites 37 collective management organisations for performers operating in 27 European countries, and represents them at European level. It is a non-profit organisation.

== See also ==
- Collective rights management
- Related rights
- https://digital-strategy.ec.europa.eu/en/library/collective-rights-management-directive-publication-collective-management-organisations-and
