= Intellectual property in China =

Intellectual property rights (IPRs) have been acknowledged and protected in China since 1980. China has acceded to the major international conventions on protection of rights to intellectual property. Domestically, protection of intellectual property law has also been established by government legislation, administrative regulations, and decrees in the areas of trademark, copyright, and patent.

China first began accepting foreign IP concepts when foreign countries forced the Qing dynasty to accept them as part of the bilateral treaties that followed the Boxer Protocol (1901). The early People's Republic of China abolished the statutes enacted by China's Nationalist government and adopted an approach to copyright, trademark, and patent issues more consistent with the model of the Soviet Union. Chinese policymakers became interested in integrating into the global IP framework as the government sought to import more technology in the 1970s.

In the 1980s, China began to join international treaties on IP issues. After joining the World Trade Organization in 2001, it assumed IP obligations under the TRIPS Agreement and revised its domestic laws to conform to the TRIPS standards. Internationally, China's view is that the World Intellectual Property Organization (WIPO) should be the primary international forum for IP rule-making. Generally, China's approach internationally is to advocate for maintaining the TRIPS standards, sometimes joining with other developing countries to oppose an increase in obligations beyond TRIPS.

China's legal framework for intellectual property protection is developing rapidly as China becomes a source of innovation, although its IP framework is still less developed than most industrialized nations as of 2023. The general trend of its IP system has been to develop towards increasing similarity with the E.U. and U.S. systems.

== International framework ==
Historically, China began accepting foreign IP concepts at the start of the 20th century, abolished them when the PRC was established, and began acknowledging IP rights during Reform and Opening up. In 1902, the Qing dynasty agreed to the Boxer Protocol and agreed to establish domestic laws on IP in bilateral treaties that followed.

After the 1972 visit of United States President Richard Nixon to the People's Republic of China, China increasingly sought to import technology. The desire to important technology prompted China to begin integrating itself into the global IP framework.

In 1980, China became a member of the World Intellectual Property Organization (WIPO). As of at least 2023, China's view is that WIPO should be the primary international forum for IP rule-making. China acceded to the WIPO-administered the Paris Convention for the Protection of Industrial Property on 19 December 1984 and became an official member on 19 March 1985. China also acceded to the WIPO-administered Madrid Agreement for the International Registration of Trademarks in June 1989. China is also a signatory to the WIPO-administered Beijing Treaty on Audiovisual Performances, which enhances performers' intellectual property rights. It is the only IP treaty named after a Chinese city.

China acceded to the Berne Convention for the Protection of Literary and Artistic Works in 1992 and assumed its obligations under the Agreement on Trade-Related Aspects of Intellectual Property Rights (TRIPS Agreement) when it joined the World Trade Organization in 2001. China's adoption of TRIPS incentivized Chinese policymakers to improve the country's regulatory structure to encourage national innovation and resulted in significant domestic policy reforms. The TRIPS agreement is also the basis of China's domestic IP law, as China conformed its IP law, including regarding patents, trademark, and copyright, to the TRIPS standards.

Following the TRIPS Agreement, a recurring issue for the WTO has been discussion over the creation of a geographical indications register (protecting GI wine and spirits) or a geographical indication extension which would go beyond wines and spirits. China's regional specialties are generally more geared towards agricultural products rather than wines and spirits, and tends to favor a geographical indication extension.

IP was an important consideration during the course of China's negotiations to re-enter the General Agreement on Tariffs and Trade (GATT).

In 2012, China hosted the China-ASEAN Seminar on the Protection of Intellectual Property Rights, Traditional Knowledge, and Genetic Resources.

As of at least 2023, China's general approach in addressing IP issues in international forums is to maintain TRIPS Agreement standards and sometimes joining the proposals of other developing countries to oppose further increases in IP standards. China has also been trending towards increased alignment with the positions taken by developed countries. The global regulation of IP involves multiple non-hierarchical international institutions, and China sometimes adopts different or inconsistent proposals in different forums. Since the creation of the Ministry of Commerce (MOFCOM) in 2003, MOFCOM has generally been China's lead negotiator on IP issues in international forums.

As part of the Like-Minded Megadiverse Countries (LMMC), China promotes international negotiations on the disclosure of the origin of genetic resources in the context of patents. China is involved in discussions on the protection of genetic resources in a variety of international forums, including the TRIPS Council, the WIPO Intergovernmental Committee, and in its free-trade agreements. As of at least 2023, multilateral negotiations on the disclosure obligation feature strong disagreements between LMMC, EU, and the United States regarding whether a disclosure obligation is necessary and if so, how one should be implemented.

== National legal framework ==
China's legal framework for intellectual property protection is developing rapidly as China becomes a source of innovation, although its IP framework is still less developed than most industrialized nations as of 2023. The general trend of its IP system has been to develop towards increasing similarity with the E.U. and U.S. systems.

China established its first Trademark Law in 1982, its Patent Law in 1984, and its Copyright Law in 1990. It comprehensively amended these laws after it joined the World Trade Organization in 2001.

=== Trademark law ===
In 1950, China issued Procedures for Dealing with Trademarks Registered at the Trademark Office of the Former Kuomintang Government which eliminated all trademarks registered under the Nationalist government. Provisional Regulations on Trademark Registration, issued in the same year, allowed registration of foreign trademarks. Few holders used the procedures.

In conformity with the TRIPS Agreement, China amended the Trademark Law in 2000.

China uses a first-to-file trademark registration system. Trademark registrants do not need to demonstrate their prior use of a trademark.

The first-to-file system caused a serious problem with trademark squatters who would register marks properly belonging to other companies. In 2019, China issued new regulations that provide a person may not register a mark in bad faith and lacking intent to use or infringe on others’ prior use rights.

=== Copyright law ===
==== History ====
The concept of copyright in China has been found to exist at least as far back as the Song dynasty (960–1279). The publishers of a work at that time wrote on the final page of a text that it could not be copied. The first modern official code was implemented in 1910 at the end of the Qing dynasty (1644–1912). A new version was issued in 1915 during the Warlord Era of the Republic of China. On May 23, 1928, the Nationalist Government enacted a copyright law that covered books, music, paintings, photographs, engravings, and models. The copyright for most items existed for 30 years after the death of the author. Translations of literary works had a 20-year copyright and photographs had a 10-year copyright after publication. Corporate copyright existed for 30 years after publication.

The People's Republic of China abolished the Republic of China statutes in 1949. The PRC found the Soviet intellectual model more consistent with traditional Chinese thinking than the Republic of China model, as the Soviet model accorded with the idea that through invention or creation, people engaged in social activities drawing on a body of knowledge that belonged to all people. In contrast to patents and trademarks, the early PRC did not issue comparable copyright regulations. Instead, official policy in this area was set by resolutions passed in the early 1950s. These included editorial rules by which state publishing entities were encouraged to memorialize the author-publisher relationship in contracts which would cover submitting manuscripts, publication, and payment.

A copyright statute was not adopted until 1990. WIPO provided technical assistance to China during the drafting of the 1990 Copyright Law.

==== Current law ====
The Copyright Law was amended in 2000 to ensure compliance with China's obligations under the TRIPS Agreement.

In 2015, the National Copyright Administration required all domestic online music platforms to remove unlicensed music or face severe sanctions.

An influential decision by the Beijing Internet Court has ruled that artificial intelligence-generated content is entitled to copyright protection.

=== Patent law ===
In 1950, the PRC issued Provisional Regulations on the Protection of Invention Rights and Patent Rights. The PRC's early regulations provided for inventors' patent rights, but these were abolished fairly quickly under the view that patent rights were incompatible with socialism. China then followed the model of the Soviet Union's investor certificates, honorary titles that were granted to investors without remuneration. Just prior to the Cultural Revolution, China completely abolished its patent regulations.

In 1984, China passed the Patent Law of the PRC to encourage invention-creation and to promote the development of science and technology. The subsequent Implementing Regulations of the Patent Law of the PRC added clarification.

In addition to invention patents and design patents, utility patents are available under Chinese law. In cases of joint patentees, the default rule in China is that each patentee can grant nonexclusive license without the other joint patentees' consent. Joint patentees can avoid application of this default rule by agreement, however.

As compared to the United States, China has more non-patentable matters. Pharmaceuticals and chemicals were not patentable under the 1984 Patent Law, but became patentable after the law was amended in 1992. A bilateral memorandum of understanding with the United States made this amendment to domestic law necessary. China accepted this requirement because it would have ultimately been necessary in order for China to re-enter GATT.

The Patent Law was again amended in 2000 to ensure compliance with China's obligations under the TRIPS Agreement. In 2008, amendments to the Patent Law added provisions on the protection of genetic resources. These amendments established a disclosure obligation for genetic resources, a domestic provision which developed from the positions China took in negotiating on this issue in the TRIPS Council. 2010 Implementation Rules of the Patent Law define genetic resources as any material taken from a human, animal, plant, or microorganism containing genetically functioning units with actual or potential value.

China became the country filing the largest number of patents in 2011. This increase resulted in part from government incentives to patent filers, outpacing China's actual R&D spending and labor productivity. Most design and utility patents, which enjoy a shorter protection period and are easier to obtain compared to invention patents, were not renewed after five years. In 2020 the Chinese government began pushing for stricter standards in granting patents.

=== Other legislation and regulations ===
Apart from major legislation on trademarks, copyright and patents, a few other laws and regulations have been passed to deal with intellectual property related issues. In 1986, the General Principles of Civil Law was adopted to protect the lawful civil rights and interests of citizens and legal persons, and to correctly regulate civil relations. Articles 94–97 of the General Principles of Civil Law deal with intellectual property rights of Chinese citizens and legal persons.

In the 1990s, many more pieces of legislation were passed to perfect the intellectual property protection system. These include the Regulations on Customs Protection of Intellectual Property Rights (1995) and the Law Against Unfair Competition of the PRC (1993). The latter prohibited the passing off of registered trademarks, infringing trade secrets, the illegal use of well-known goods or names of other people, as well as other misleading and deceptive conduct. The Advertising Law of the PRC was passed in 1994 and extensively revised in 2015, to now include a joint liability with the advertising spokesperson, special regulations on public interest advertising, and most importantly a definition of misleading advertisement.

The Anti-Monopoly Law provides for investigating unreasonable IP licensing fees and authority for further supplementary regulations on IP issues.

The Law of Seeds (2000) established the principle of state sovereignty over the regulation of germplasm resources for plant seeds. Eight years later, amendments to the Patent Law more broadly addressed protection for genetic resources.

Although rarely enforced, the Administration of Technology Import/Export Regulations (TIER) previously prohibited foreign enterprises licensing their technology to China from restricting where that technology could be used and required them to waive any rights related to subsequent improvements to the technology. The provisions of TIER had been the subject of a number of WTO disputes. In March 2019, China agreed to revoke some of the TIER provisions.A Foreign Investment Law introduced in late 2019 banned forced technology transfers.

With regard to artificial intelligence, the Cyberspace Administration of China issued draft measures which, among other provisions, obligate tech companies to implement safeguards to ensure their artificial intelligence platforms respect intellectual property rights.

=== Geographical indications ===
The use of place names as part of product names to emphasize regional specialties existed in China for over 3,000 years. China first encountered European-style geographical indications as intellectual property following Reform and Opening Up in the 1980s. Under China's 1984 Trademark Law, geographical names were excluded from trademark registration and in 1986, the State Administration for Industry and Commerce prohibited the use of geographical names of administrative divisions at or above the county levels as trademarks. However, regulators in China began protecting foreign geographical indications on a case-by-case basis.

In the 2001 amendments to China's Trademark Law, China adopted the provision on geographical indications from the TRIPS Agreement. Under this standard, if a trademark contains a place name but the product does not originate in that area, the geographical name should not be used or registered given the risk of misleading the public. A grandfather clause provides an exception where an otherwise prohibited trademark already registered in good faith remains valid.

The General Administration of Quality Supervision, Inspection and Quarantine (AQSIQ) established a sui generis system to cover the use of geographical indication products through the 2005 Provisions on the Protection of GI Products. These regulations establish protection and requirements for products using place names if (1) the product is grown or bred from a certain place name location and all of the raw materials come from that place, (2) products produced elsewhere but for which all of the raw materials come from the place name location, and (3) products where some of the raw materials come from elsewhere but are produced in the place name location using specialized techniques. This approach is intended to accommodate the use of geographical indications in handicrafts like embroidery or ceramics. The regulation sets strict standards for products produced under the geographical indication, and non-compliance results in a producer losing the ability to use the place name.

In 2007, the Ministry of Agriculture (MOA) issued a regulation on the protection of agricultural geographical indication products. These are defined as including plants, animals, and microorganisms.

China and the European Union signed a GI agreement in September 2020. The agreement developed from pilot programs over the preceding eight years in which China and the EU worked on mutual registering and protection of geographical indications. The 2020 agreement extends mutual recognition of geographical indications to 275 from each side.

The 2020 U.S.-China Economic and Trade Agreement required China to amend its domestic regulations regarding geographic indications, including to provide that geographical indications may become generic over time.

As of 2023, nine of China's bilateral free trade agreements include provisions dealing with geographical indications. China has generally taken a flexible approach with regard to these provisions and proceeds on the basis of reciprocity.

== Implementation ==
More than 30 government ministries are involved in domestic IP governance. To enforce IPR protection, an administrative system has been established within the government. After the reshuffle of the State Council in March 1998, the Patent Office became part of the State Intellectual Property Office (SIPO). In 2011, SIPO became the world's largest patent office. SIPO developed its own Traditional Chinese Medicine Patent database compiling patents granted for traditional Chinese medicines. In September 2018, SIPO was renamed the China National Intellectual Property Administration (CNIPA).

The Trademarks Office is still under the authority of the State Administration for Industry and Commerce.

The Copyright Office falls within the State Administration for Press and Publication. A similar system exists at various levels of local government. Commonly, enforcement of IPRs will be carried out by local IPRs personnel, assisted by police from the local Public Security Bureau.

China's IP regulators and policy-makers generally maintain close contact with their peers from developed countries and in international institutions.

In addition to government bodies, non-state actors are also involved in China's engagement on IP issues.

=== Policy approach ===
China released its National IP Strategy in 2008. Since 2012, China frames intellectual property as an important part of its strategy of driving development through innovation. In 2013, China issued its Action Plan on Further Implementing the National IP Strategy (2014–2020). It sets numerical targets for patent applications, trademark registrations, and copyright registrations. In 2015, China described its IP as an important mechanism for stimulating innovation, increasing China's technological competitiveness, and facilitating development. Influenced by these policies, China in 2019 became the largest user of the WIPO's Patent Cooperation Treaty.

Since the 2010s, continuing through at least 2023, China has been active in negotiating IP rules in regional trade agreements like RCEP, bilateral agreements, and the Belt and Road Initiative. In conjunction with the BRI, China does not attempt to impose IP standards on participating countries. It works with WIPO to implement training and events design to increase the IP governing capacity of BRI countries. In 2016, WIPO initiated the High-Level Conference on Intellectual Property for BRI Countries, where WIPO Director General Francis Gurry encouraged participating countries to use WIPO tools like its global IP services and databases and to join WIPO-administered IP treaties.

=== Courts and tribunals ===
In the 1980s, Chinese courts and regulators began to enforce intellectual property protections on the basis international treaties China had signed before corresponding domestic IP laws were yet in place.

The number of IP cases prosecuted criminally in Chinese courts has been on a significant upward trend from 2005 to 2015, suggesting tougher enforcement of IP laws.

In patent litigation, infringement and invalidation claims generally proceed separately rather than being addressed at the same trial. Foreign firms have been increasingly successful in litigating patent infringement suits in China, winning approximately 70% of the time in the period 2006 to 2011, and rising to approximately 80% in the late 2010s.

Since 2008, filings for patent and trademark protection by both Chinese and national firms have skyrocketed, leading to increased government focus on IP protection, including establishing specialized intellectual property courts to more effectively resolve disputes.

In October 2014, the Supreme People's Court provided additional regulatory guidance on specialized intellectual property court jurisdiction. The specialized IP courts sit at the intermediate court level and have first instance jurisdiction over all technically complex civil and administrative IP cases (including patents, new plant varieties, integrated circuit layout designs, trade secrets, and computer software). They also have first instance jurisdiction over well-known trademarks and deal with all other IP cases upon appeal from the basic people's courts in their province.86 In terms of administrative law, the Beijing Intellectual Property Court also has special, first-instance jurisdiction over administrative appeals brought against decisions issued by administrative IP adjudication bodies. Since 2017, the system has expanded to include 20 specialized IP tribunals across the country. Although these tribunals are administratively a part of the intermediate people's court in their city, they have cross-regional and exclusive subject matter jurisdiction over IP cases—similar to the IP courts established in 2014.

In 2019, the city of Hangzhou established a pilot program artificial intelligence-based Internet Court to adjudicate internet-related intellectual property claims as well as ecommerce disputes. Parties appear before the court via videoconference and AI evaluates the evidence presented and applies relevant legal standards.

=== Difficulties ===
Sometimes local protectionism may dilute the strength of central legislation or the power of law enforcement. For example, local governments might not want to genuinely support the work of copyright protection supervisors. It may create obstacles during IPRs investigation and assist local counterfeiters by letting them hide their production lines in safer places. When counterfeiters have good connections with local governmental or law enforcement officials, they may find an umbrella for their counterfeiting activity.

Chinese government-sponsored search-engine Baidu provides links to third-party websites that offer online counterfeit products as well as access to counterfeit hardware and merchandise. The Chinese government dominates 70% of its country's search engine revenue and has been called on by US officials to limit the activity of online counterfeiting groups.

== Cases ==
The first major dispute on violation of intellectual property rights was filed in April 1992 by Wang Yongmin, the inventor of Wubi, against Dongnan Corporation.

In March 1992 Chinese authorities found that Shenzhen reflective materials institute had copied 650,000 Microsoft Corporation holograms. The institute was found to be guilty of trademark infringement against Microsoft and was fined US$252. Losses to Microsoft as a result of the infringement are estimated at US$30 million.

In the 1994 Disney v. Beijing Publishing House case dealt with how a Chinese court would apply international agreements in copyright disputes. The dispute resulted when Disney licensed its copyright to a licensee, who in turn violated the license agreement by improperly licensing copyright material to Beijing Publishing House. Disney sued for copyright infringement, but the licensing agreement pre-dated the 1992 China-U.S. Memorandum of Understanding that first provided for reciprocal copyright protection between the two countries. The court decided to apply the MOU to the dispute and to construe it as a treaty, ordering Beijing Publishing House to pay damages to Disney.

In 2001, the China Environmental Project Tech Inc. filed a patent infringement lawsuit against American company Huayang Electronics Co. and Japanese FKK after those companies profited using a CEPT patented technique for using seawater in a fuel gas desulphurization process. Though the Supreme Court ruled in favor of CEPT, the court failed to issue an injunction because the infringing process was being used to generate electricity and an injunction would interfere with the public interest. The court instead awarded RMB 50 million to CEPT.

In 2007, CHINT Group Co. Ltd sued French low-voltage electronics manufacturer Schneider for infringement of a circuit breaker utility model patent. The Wenzhou Intermediate People's Court ruled in CHINT's favor, awarding RMB 334.8 million to the Chinese manufacturer, the highest amount ever in a Chinese IP case. After Schneider appealed to the High Court of Zhejiang province, the courts mediated the issue and the parties settled for RMB 157.5 million. In its judgement, the Wenzhou Intermediate People's Court labeled the case "the no. 1 case of patent infringement in China". At the EU–China summit 2007, EU Trade Commissioner Peter Mandelson said, "I regard the SCHNEIDER case as a test case of the level playing field in China on intellectual property protection that we want to see".

In 2014, Tencent sued its major competitor NetEase alleging copyright infringement. Tencent used its leverage from the suit to convince NetEase to sublicense music rights from Tencent. The sub-licensing arrangement that resulted then became a model used by other online music platforms in China.

In 2016 the Lego group sued a manufacturer in China over copyright infringement involving sales worth more than 330 million RMB. In 2020 a Shanghai court sentenced nine individuals to three to six years of prison time and fines of up to 90 million RMB.

In 2018 Micron Technology, a U.S. memory chip maker, accused Chinese competitor Fujian Jinhua and Taiwanese manufacturer UMC of stealing chip designs. The U.S. Department of Justice (DOJ) announced an indictment against Fujian Jinhua and UMC. In October 2020, UMC pleaded guilty and agreed to pay a fine in exchange for cooperating with the DOJ. In February 2024, US District Judge Maxine M. Chesney in San Francisco acquitted Fujian Jinhua of the charge in a non-jury verdict, judging that the prosecutor failed to provide sufficient evidence.

In September 2019, Levi's won final judgment in Guangzhou IP Court on a trademark infringement in Guangzhou, China. The case centred on the "arcuate design on two pockets at the back of jeans", which has been protected in China since its registration there in 2005. The company won damages and costs in addition to a ban on future infringements. The infringer's ignorance of the trademark was no bar to punishment.

In 2021 Belgian artist Christian Silvain sued Chinese artist Ye Yongqing for plagiarism. Since the 1990s, Ye's works have taken on composition and motifs similar to those of Silvain. On 24 August 2023, the Beijing Intellectual Property Court awarded €650,000 ($696,000) in damages to Silvain, the highest amount so far for cases related to fine arts in China, and ordered Ye to make a public apology in the Global Times. It was still lower than what Silvain had hoped for, but as of September 2023 his lawyers had not appealed the ruling for a larger sum.

== U.S.–China relations ==
IP first became a significant negotiating point between the countries in establishing the U.S.-China Agreement on High Energy Physics and the U.S.-China Agreement on Trade Relations. Those agreements were reached in 1979. The two countries negotiated four bilateral memoranda of understanding dealing with IP issues over the period 1988 to 1996.

During the early 1990s, the U.S. often criticized China's IP protections and at times threatened unilateral retaliation. WIPO defended China's progress and in 1993 WIPO Director General Árpád Bogsch described China's intellectual property development as unprecedented in the history of intellectual property. China cited Bogsch's statement in responding to U.S. criticism and the dynamic led to growth in the China-WIPO relationship.

Responding to the U.S. pressure to increase intellectual property enforcement in the 1990s, China began a long-term campaign "against pornography and piracy of intellectual property rights." Through this approach, China increased popular support for its measures by tying a popular policy (opposing pornography) to one with comparatively little public intertest (preventing the piracy of IP."

In 2007, the U.S. sued China in the WTO, resulting in China's further amendment of domestic IP laws to comply with the WTO panel's decision.

To streamline the patent application process for patentees filing under both the Chinese and United States systems, the State Intellectual Property Office of the People's Republic of China (SIPO) and the U.S. Patent and Trademark Office (USPTO) established a Patent Prosecution Highway (PPH) pilot program on December 1, 2011.

In an effort to facilitate renewable energy research and development collaboration by providing more predictability to the patent process, the U.S.–China Clean Energy Research Center (CERC) established a novel Technology Management Plan to govern intellectual property issues arising under its projects. Within CERC, owners who brought IP to CERC retained "all right, title, and interest in their background IP" and were not required to license, assign, or transfer it. The CERC Technology Management Plan required, in the event of dispute, that the parties should attempt to reach a mutually agreeable resolution. If none could be reached, the Technology Management Plan required submission of the dispute to arbitration in accordance with the rules of the United Nations Commission on International Trade Law. No instances of arbitration were ultimately required by CERC.

In 2014, the Office of the United States Trade Representative once again placed China on its "priority watch list" for intellectual property rights violations, along with other nations. In addition, the U.S., based on claims brought to it by the China Copyright Alliance (CCA)—a group of major copyright industry associations and select companies—brought two World Trade Organization (WTO) cases against China, one focused on intellectual property rights violations, and one based on market access deficiencies. In both cases, it was ruled that China must change its operating standards to comply with WTO rules; in the IPR case, a helpful standard was established as to the definition of "commercial scale" for which criminal penalties would be required, but found that the U.S. had not supplied sufficient evidence to show that China's 500 copy threshold for criminal liability left some "commercial scale" infringement cases without a criminal remedy.

The American Chamber of Commerce in the People's Republic of China surveyed over 500 of its members doing business in China regarding IPR for its 2016 China Business Climate Survey Report, and found that IPR enforcement is improving, but significant challenges still remain. The results show that the laws in place exceed their actual enforcement, with patent protection receiving the highest approval rate, while protection of trade secrets lags far behind. Many US companies have said that Chinese companies have stolen their intellectual property some time between 2009 and 2019. There are three main ways to address this issue. One is to bring a case to the WTO, which usually takes years to reach a final decision and requires a standard of proof against Chinese laws with respect to WTO rules that can be difficult to meet. Another avenue is unilateral restrictions on Chinese exports and investment, possibly leading to retaliations and a trade war. A third avenue is the negotiation of a bilateral investment treaty (BIT) with China that contains a dispute settlement mechanism between states and investors in order to ensure effective enforcement.

The 2020 U.S.-China Economic and Trade Agreement includes the highest IP enforcement standards of any U.S. bilateral agreement. It includes provisions on patent linkages, patent term extensions, data exclusivity, trade secrets, and higher criminal standards for infringement.

Although legal disputes between American and Chinese entities alleging mishandling or misappropriation of intellectual property occur, the most frequent basis for disputes stems from misunderstandings based on the differing IP rules and legal systems of the two countries.

== See also ==
- Allegations of intellectual property infringement by China
- China International Copyright Expo
- China–United States trade war
- First Sino-American Forum of Intellectual Property Rights
- Music copyright infringement in China
