= National Copyright Administration =

Chinese Communist Party organization

- 国家版权局
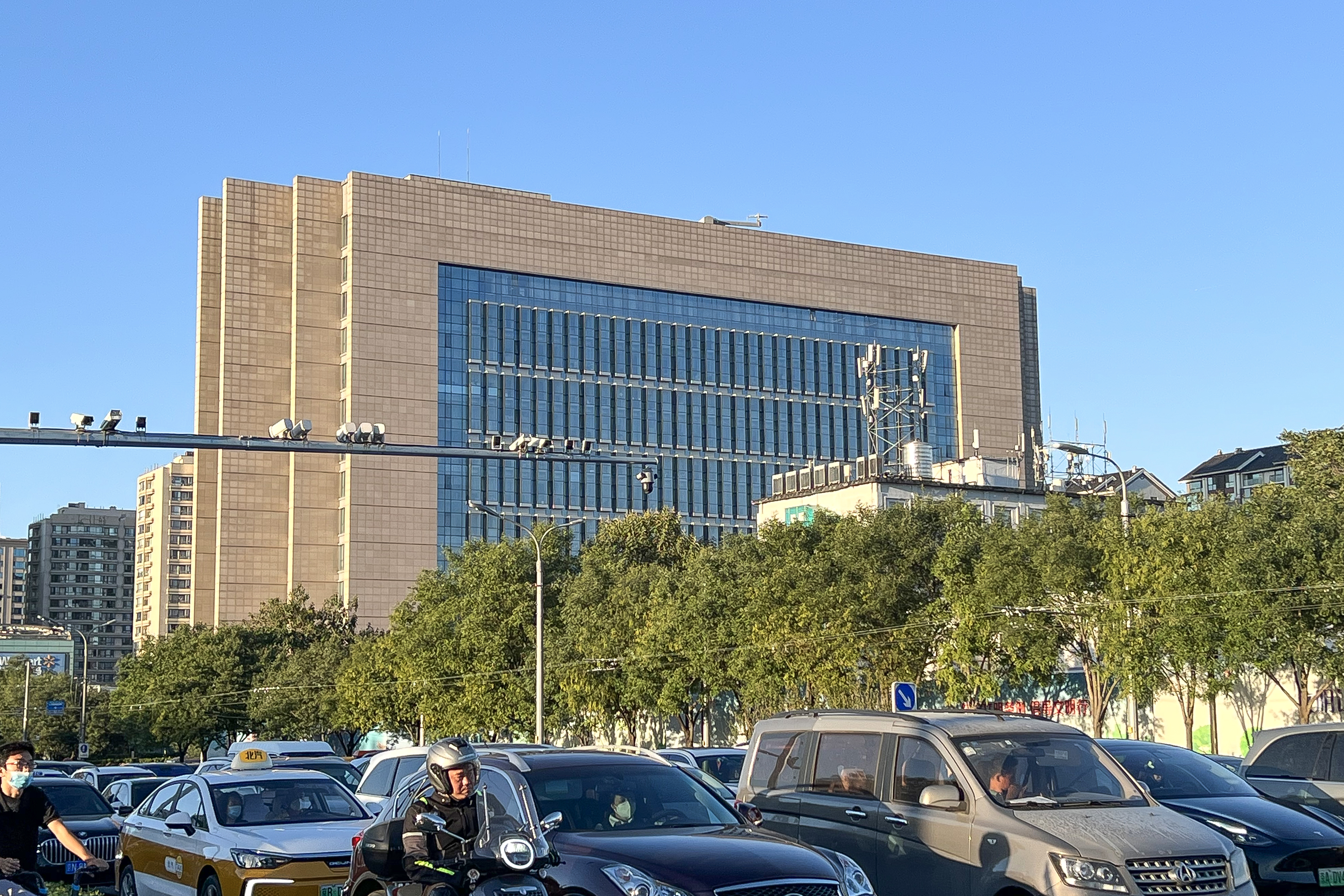
- Headquarters

Agency overview
- Formed: July 25, 1985
- Jurisdiction: Government of China
- Status: External name of the Publicity Department of the Chinese Communist Party
- Headquarters: No. 40 Xuanwumenwai Street, Xicheng District, Beijing
- Website: www.ncac.gov.cn

Chinese name
- Simplified Chinese: 国家版权局
- Traditional Chinese: 國家版權局
Transcriptions
Standard Mandarin
- Hanyu Pinyin: Guójiā Bǎnquánjú

The National Copyright Administration (NCAC) is an external name of the Publicity Department of the Chinese Communist Party and one institution with two names with the National Press and Publication Administration. Its responsibilities are managed by the Copyright Administration Bureau of the Publicity Department.

== History ==
On 28 June 1985, the Ministry of Culture submitted a proposal to the State Council to establish the National Copyright Administration on the basis of the Publishing Administration of the Ministry of Culture. On July 25, the State Council approved the proposal of the Ministry of Culture and decided to change the Publishing Administration of the Ministry of Culture to the National Publishing Administration, increase 50 administrative positions, and make the National Publishing Administration and the National Copyright Administration one institution with two names, and list them as agencies directly under the State Council. The Director of the National Copyright Administration will concurrently serve as the Director of the National Publishing Administration. The comprehensive publishing houses were split into specialized publishing houses and new publishing houses were established.

Although in theory the NCA should have bee a direct subordinate of the State Council, it was originally established under the National Publishing Administration and has since been affiliated with the press and publication agencies (the Publishing Administration or the General Administration of Press and Publication), forming a one institution with two names structure and affecting the subordinate relationship of local copyright administrative departments.

In January 1987, the State Council decided to abolish the National Publishing Administration under the Ministry of Culture and establish the Press and Publication Administration directly under the State Council, while retaining the National Copyright Administration, which remained as one institution with two names. In 2001, the Press and Publication Administration (National Copyright Administration) was upgraded to a ministerial-level unit and renamed the General Administration of Press and Publication (National Copyright Administration), which remained one institution with two names. A three-level copyright management system was established across the country: central, provincial, autonomous region, municipality directly under the central government, and prefecture-level cities.

In March 2013, the first session of the 12th National People's Congress approved the "Plan for the Reform of the State Council's Institutions and Functions", integrating the responsibilities of the General Administration of Press and Publication and the State Administration of Radio, Film and Television to form the State Administration of Press, Publication, Radio, Film and Television, which was also named the National Copyright Administration.

In 2015, the National Copyright Administration required all domestic online music platforms to remove unlicensed music or face severe sanctions.

In March 2018, as part of the deepening the reform of the Party and state institutions, the State Administration of Press, Publication, Radio, Film and Television was abolished, and the Publicity Department retained the name of the National Copyright Administration as a one institution with two names.

== Functions ==
The NCA is responsible for taking or organizing national action against major cases of copyright infringement involving domestic and foreign interests.

== Organization ==
According to relevant regulations, the Copyright Administration Bureau of the Publicity Department has a division-level internal organization, which includes the following departments:

- General Office
- Social Services Department
- Law Enforcement and Supervision Department
- International Affairs Office

== Sources ==
- Chen, Zhaoukan (1998). "Administrative Management and Enforcement of Copyright in China". Duke Journal of Comparative & International Law. 9: 249–252.
- Xie, Huijia; Chen, Liuxi (2022). "The Amendment of Copyright Administrative Enforcement in China" (PDF). Journal of the Copyright Society of the USA. 69: 163–184.
