= Robert Lee Gilbertson =

American mycologist (1925–2011)

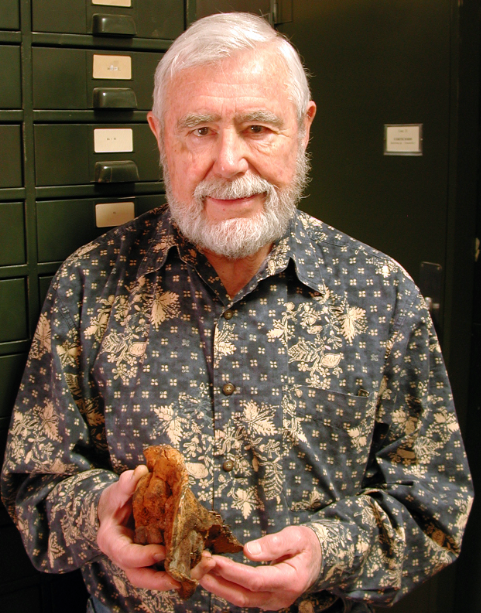
- R.L. Gilbertson at The Robert L. Gilbertson Mycological Herbarium
- Born: January 15, 1925; Hamilton, Montana, U.S.
- Died: October 26, 2011 (aged 86)
- Education: State University of New York College of Environmental Science and Forestry
- Awards: Distinguished Mycologist Award
- Scientific career
- Fields: Mycology
- Workplaces: University of Arizona
- Doctoral advisor: Josiah Lowe

Robert Lee Gilbertson (January 15, 1925 – October 26, 2011) was a distinguished American mycologist and educator. He was a faculty member at University of Arizona for 26 years until his retirement from teaching in 1995; he was a Professor Emeritus at U of A until his death on October 26, 2011, in Tucson, Arizona. 2011. He held concurrent positions as Plant Pathologist, Agricultural Experiment Station, University of Arizona (1967–95) for a project Research on wood-rotting fungi and other fungi associated with southwestern plants and was collaborator and consultant with Center for Forest Mycology Research, US Forest Service, Forest Products Laboratory, Madison, Wisconsin (1957–1981).

== Early life ==
=== Early years ===
Gil was born on January 15, 1925, in Hamilton, Montana, to George and Eula Norris Gilbertson. He had one sibling, George N. Gilbertson. They grew up in Missoula. Gil shared his youthful adventures with a best friend whose aunt ran a bordello.

He also had fond memories of his Uncle Nick, a railroad man for whom one of his grandsons was named. Gil, always a reader, enjoyed the memoir A River Runs Through It and Other Stories not only for its literary merits, but also because it was set in the Missoula of his youth. Norman Maclean mentioned many people and places Gil had known. Also, the narrator had a younger brother who died young, and this reminded Gil of his younger brother, George, who died as a young man of a brain tumor. Gil hated that surgery had changed his brother completely but had not cured him. Growing up in Missoula, Gil also had known several men, one the father of a friend, who died in the 1949 Mann Gulch fire described in another Maclean book, Young Men and Fire.

Gil graduated from Missoula Central High School in 1942 soon after the US entered WWII. He had to wait until his January birthday when he became 18 when he could enlist in the Army. He was sent to Europe, where he served as a combat infantryman in the U. S. Army from 1943-1946. Gil received the European Theater Campaign Medal with two battle stars, a Bronze Star, and a Purple Heart.

=== Gil's stories of World War II ===
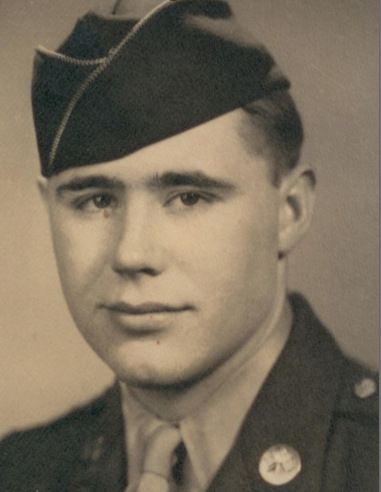
Photograph of Gilbertson in uniform of a combat infantryman in the Army

On December 13, 1984, Gil wrote about how he earned the Purple Heart.

… 40 years ago today I was a 19 year old combat infantryman in C. F, 309th Inf. Regt., 78th Inf. Division, participating in an attack on the German Wehrmacht in the Hürtgen Forest in the Ardennes. Freezing cold -- snow covering everything -- in the pre-dawn darkness a flare fired from the German lines suddenly lit up the area and revealed my company moving down a road – mortar shells and 88 shells began to fall in our midst almost immediately. My friends started dropping all around me – several killed instantly, others fatally wounded. I felt a blow on my left leg like someone had hit me with a baseball bat. I hit the ground and crawled off the road into a low spot. I realized I had dropped the spare barrel for my machine gun and crawled back out on the road and retrieved it. The company commander (Captain Brey – later killed instantly) came up and told us to go with him and he would deploy us in the woods. We went in and established our line and came under machine gun fire and mortar fire and more of our company were killed. The captain told us to dig in and I started to dig a foxhole in the frozen ground but by this time my leg really hurt and I couldn’t stand on it and my boot was full of blood. I crawled over to Captain Brey and told him I had been hit in the leg and he told me to go back to the battalion aid station, which was several hundred yards back near the area where I was wounded in the first place. I had to crawl on my stomach the whole way as the area was under heavy fire but I made it. The medic at the battalion cut off my boot and bandaged my leg and gave me some sulfa pills. Then they put me in a jeep with some other wounded guys – a couple of stretchers and the jeep tore off at high speed for the regimental aid station under artillery fire most of the way. We finally made it to the aid station set up in a house and there were a couple of surgeons there working on the most severely wounded. There were quite a few bodies there and numerous guys with severe head or chest wounds and obviously dying. I was put in an ambulance with several others and taken to a railhead where hospital trains were taking the wounded back into France. I don’t remember too much about that except a nurse came around every few hours and gave me a shot of penicillin (pretty new stuff then) and we finally arrived at Paris where we were taken to a large hospital. A chaplain came around one day with a copy of general orders awarding a bunch of us the Purple Heart. I still have my copy. After a week some of us were flown over to England in DC-3s. I remember all the air force crew had parachutes but none of us wounded had one. I asked one of the crew what we did if the Luftwaffe shot us down. He said “tough shit buddy.” Fortunately, we made it and when I arrived at the hospital in England I was pretty sure that I had probably survived the war. When I look back and realize how close I came to death at the age of 19 it doesn’t seem possible that I actually went through that experience and am alive and well today.

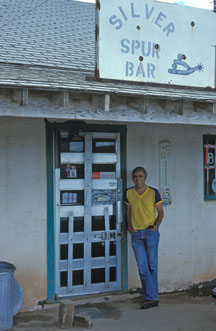
Gilbertson at Silver spur bar

On Friday October 25, 1985, he again remembered the war when he wrote about a trip to Europe when he worked at Kew and went sightseeing in London.

“On the way to Trafalgar Square we [Gil and Pat] stopped at the site of the War Room in the Cabinet Building along St. James Park and toured the restored War Museum –very fascinating to me since I was there at that time and lived through a lot of the history myself.”

He remarked that his bad feet, perhaps never recovered from the war, suffered from the long walks of sightseeing. On his 72nd birthday (15 January 1997), Gil reflected,

“I’m glad to be here when I look back to when I was 19 in the Hürtgen Forest in December 1944 and didn’t know if I would even get to be 20.”

=== Life After WWII ===
==== Education ====
Gil returned from World War II and began his studies under the G.I. Bill of Rights. In 1946 he enrolled at the University of Montana where he majored in Botany and graduated with honors. Gil married Patricia Park in 1948, and they went to the University of Washington for the next two years (1950-1951). As an undergraduate Gil assisted Reuben Diettert with his mycological research, so he had some exposure to fungi before he arrived at Washington. There he began a master's degree program with Daniel Stuntz. Gil received his master's degree in mycology with Stuntz in 1951.

Gil pursued a PhD with Josiah Lowe at State University of New York, College of Forestry at Syracuse University in 1951, studying mycology and forest pathology. Gil would go on to study wood-decay fungi for 60 years. His PhD degree was completed in 1954 in mycology and forest pathology with a thesis on Polyporus montagnei and Cyclomyces greenii and published his first paper on these species in Mycologia in 1954. His thesis on the genus Poria in the central Rocky Mountains and Pacific Northwest was published in 1954.

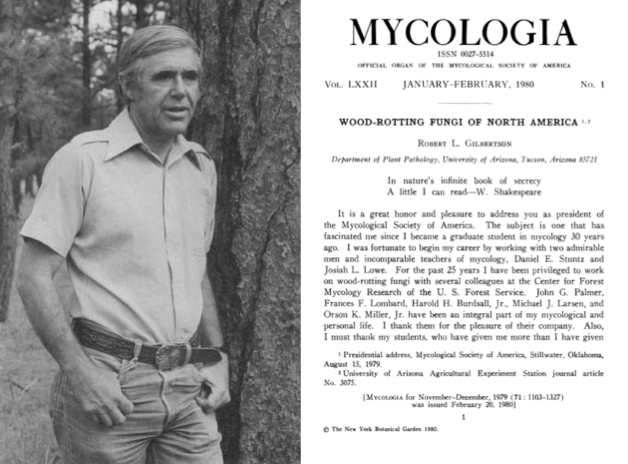
Gilbertson's presidential address in Mycologia

==== Post-doctoral studies and professorships ====
After receiving his PhD Gil remained at Syracuse for six months as a research assistant until he was hired as an assistant professor of forestry at the University of Idaho. He and Pat spent the next five years (1954–59) in Moscow, and their son and daughter, Park and Joan, were born in Moscow, Idaho, 27 August 1956 and 23 July 1959, respectively. From Idaho Gil returned to Syracuse as associate professor of botany in the College of Forestry for eight years (1959-1967). He was appointed as professor at the University of Arizona in 1967. He concurrently held positions as plant pathologist, Agricultural Experiment Station, University of Arizona (1967–95) for a project “Research on wood-rotting fungi and other fungi associated with southwestern plants” and was collaborator and consultant with Center for Forest Mycology Research, US Forest Service, Forest Products Laboratory, Madison, Wisconsin (1957-1981). He spent 26 years on the faculty in Tucson until his retirement from teaching in 1995 and then as Professor Emeritus until his death on October 26, 2011, from complications due to prostate cancer Gil's Obituary Arizona Daily Star

In 2001, he was honoured by botanist Erast Parmasto who named a fungal genus in the family Fomitopsidaceae as Gilbertsonia.

== The Robert L. Gilbertson Mycological Herbarium ==
Gil's mycological herbarium is an important legacy. It contains almost 40,000 wood-decaying and other fungal specimens, especially from Arizona and the western United States, Mexico, Hawaii, Alaska, and the Gulf Coast region. He built the collection from almost nothing and accessioned the specimens with minimal assistance. In 2005 the University completed the renovation of historic Herring Hall, and the University of Arizona Fungal Herbarium, renamed the Robert L. Gilbertson Mycological Herbarium was inaugurated on Friday, March 11, 2005. The names of the fungi were current ones, unusual for wood decay fungi, a group in which genus level reassignments remain common. The National Science Foundation recently supplied funding for digitization that currently is underway and should soon be available by searching the herbarium on the Internet. The value of Gil's collection has been increased by the precise substrate information and geographical coverage he included for his collections.

The Herbarium is unique because its specialized collections document the occurrence of a complex, speciose desert mycota in a region once said by proposal reviewers to have no fungi. Gil put great stock in the USDA Yearbook of Agriculture (1941) that contained state unit values for precipitation. When someone asked why he bothered to plan a foray for the August 1980 MSA meeting with AIBS in Tucson, he was quick to point out that August rainfall in Arizona was almost three times greater than that of Washington state (Gilbertson 1980). The collection also houses the vouchers of the many new and rare fungi, large numbers fully documented from Gil's large number of publications. The collection is a resource for economically, biographically, and taxonomically important groups of fungi.

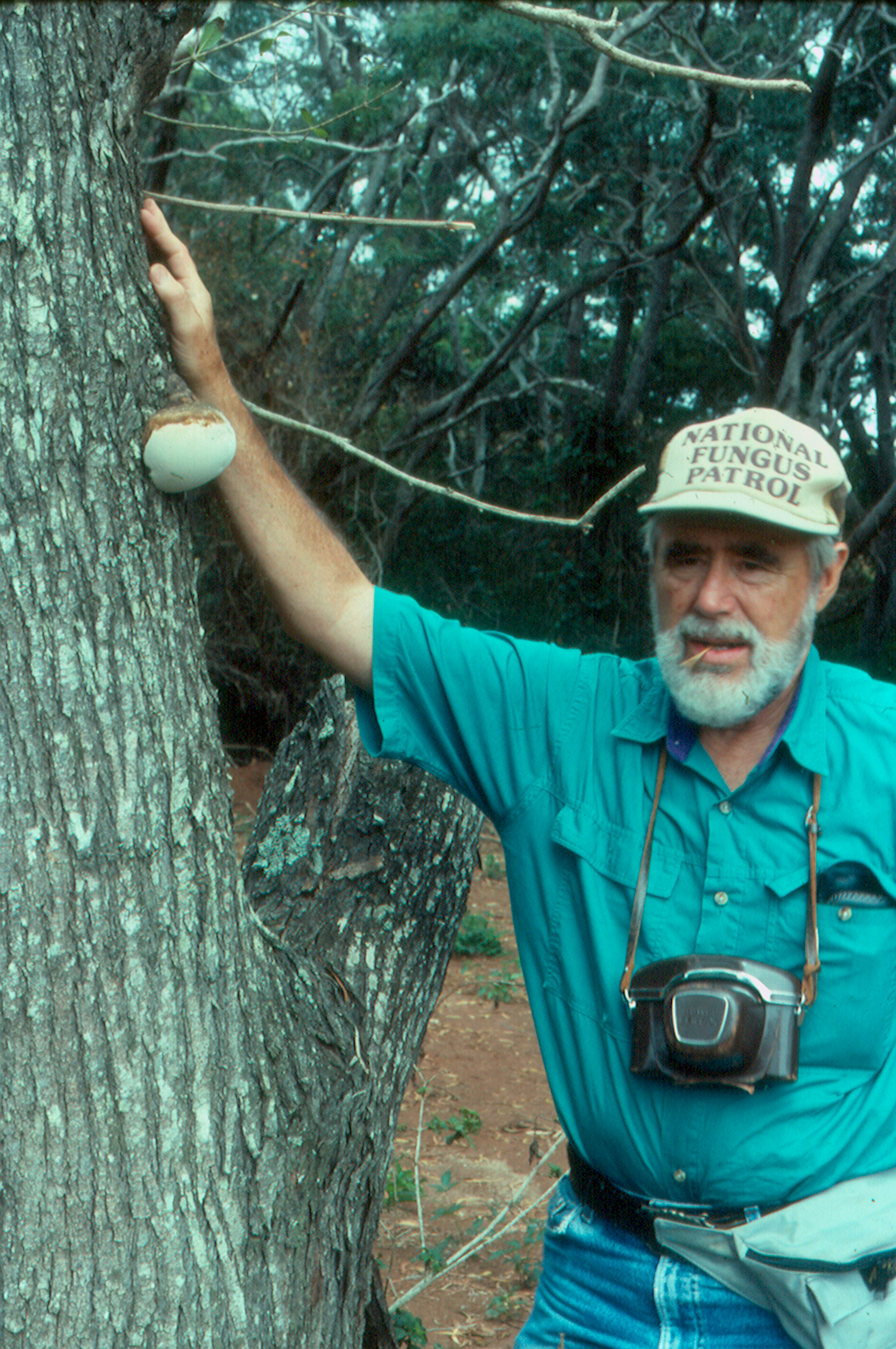
Gilbertson leaning on a tree with a Fomitopsis fruit body

== Research areas of interest ==
Mycological systematics and floristics; wood-rotting basidiomycetes; biological diversity in world ecosystems.

Gil's contributions to mycology extended to many fungal groups, most notably Sonoran Desert rusts, myxomycetes, downy mildews, and ascomycetes, and even the fungus-like plant pathogens, Pythium and Labyrinthula . His work included the use of cladistics, synoptic keys, and the study of wood decay, wood decay inhibitors, and detoxification processes. Gil described many new fungal species from under-studied substrates, including fungi that are associated with Sonoran Desert plants and cacti.

Dr. Gilbertson's research concerned several aspects of the biology of wood-rotting basidiomycetes. These aspects included systematics, floristics, cultural morphology, genetics of sexuality including homogenic and heterogenic incompatibility, biochemical and ultrastructural changes in wood during decay, and the use of these fungi for commercial degradation of wood and the biological breakdown of toxic phenolic environmental pollutants. Dr. Gilbertson's research on species of the genus Ganoderma has shown that several are capable of selective delignification, degrading lignin at a faster rate than they do the polysaccharide components of the wood cell wall. The most promising of these is Ganoderma colossum , a thermophilic soil inhabiting fungus of subtropical forest ecosystems. Dr. Gilbertson's research with this and other species of Ganoderma was directed at determining the relation of temperature and length of exposure to delignification and rate of decay. Research on the systematics and floristics of wood-rotting fungi has been directed at the urgency to elucidate biological diversity in world ecosystems. Recent research in this field involved preparation of a monograph of the genus Inonotus with Dr. Leif Ryvarden on flora of the University of Oslo and preparation of a flora of wood-decaying basidiomycetes of Hawaii.

== Professional service ==
Gil was active in the Mycological Society of America, and he was elected Councilor, Vice President, then President-Elect and President at a time when the Vice-President did not automatically rise to the presidency. He continued to contribute to the society, and after his term as president he served as Chairman of the Awards Committee, Local Arrangements Chairman, member of the Foray Committee, and Chairman of the Honorary Members Committee. The society honored Gil with its highest award, the Distinguished Mycologist Award, in 1994. Gil's MSA presidential address on wood-decaying basidiomycetes (Gilbertson 1980) remains a classic.

Gil was a founding member of the Western International Forest Disease Work Conferences (WIFDWC), an annual gathering of western North American forest pathologists. He served as program chair twice, local arrangements chair, secretary (1969), and chair (1980), and as its "mycologist in residence" for more than 30 years. He also was a member of the American Phytopathological Society and served as an associate editor of Plant Disease for fifteen years, and the Society of American Foresters, and served as chair of the Forest Pathology working group. He also belonged to the Arizona Academy of Science, the Association of Southwestern Naturalists, the California Botanical Society, Sociedad Mexicana de Micología, and the British Mycological Society, and was a Fellow of the Linnean Society of London.

== After retirement ==
After retirement from his academic position Gil continued to collect, especially in Hawaii and Mexico. He had a fruitful association with Don Hemmes and other colleagues including Jack Rogers and Karen Nakasone, and many of his last scientific papers cover those fungi. Gil also traveled to places he had visited in his youth in the western US. For example, he wrote (2 July 1997), “I’m back. Officially retired but back. I’m now Professor Emeritus and Curator of the Mycological Herbarium... It was fun to revisit the places where Joe [Lowe], Ross [Davidson], Alex [Smith], and I collected in 1956 [when Gil was 31 and working at Idaho]. "

== Mycological colleagues ==
Gil had many close friends who studied fungi, and after graduation he traveled throughout the country with his major professor Josiah Lowe. The friends included Wilhelm G. Solheim, who taught forest pathology at the University of Arizona (1965-1967) after his retirement from the University of Wyoming and filled in until Gil arrived in Tucson. Another close friend, George Baker Cummins, retired to Tucson, where he spent many productive years working in space Gil shared with him. Gil and George worked to provide “Indexes to W.G. Solheim's Mycoflora Saximontanensis Exsiccata.” Gil's last published work was a memorial to George(Gilbertson and Blackwell 2009).

John G. Palmer, Frances F. Lombard, Harold H. Burdsall, Jr., Michael J. Larsen, and Orson K. Miller, Jr. are several other colleagues acknowledged in his presidential address who were an integral part of Gil's mycological and personal life, and who and shared his interest in wood-rotting fungi.

Beginning in the 1980s, Gil became interested in the wood-inhabiting fungi of the Gulf Coast and realized a close cooperative effort in studying and describing these fungi with Meredith Blackwell as a collaborator. After retirement, Gil collected extensively in Hawaii, the specimens being the basis for a number of papers on the Hawaiian mycota, authored with Don Hemmes, Jim Adaskaveg, Karen Nakasone, Erast Parmasto, Jack Rogers and Dennis Desjardin, significantly adding to the biogeographical knowledge of the islands.

Gil was close to his own students, and these included MS students, many of whom went on to get PhDs with another advisor, Daniel O. Ebo, K. Sieglinde Neuhauser, Douglas C. Rhodes, Karen K. Nakasone, Donna Goldstein, Anjuwaree Ronaritivichai, Mary Lou Fairweather, James J. Flott, Kevin M. McCann, and Donna M. Bigelow. PhD students were Emroy L. Shannon, J. Page Lindsey, Rogerio T. de Almeida, Robert L. Mathiasen, Karin H. Yohem, Julietta Carranza, and Phyllis T. Himmel. Kenneth J. Martin and James Adaskaveg, completed both MS and PhD degrees with Gil.

Frank Hawksworth of the Forest Service, Rocky Mountain Forest and Range Experiment Station in Fort Collins, a close friend from Western International Forest Disease Work Conferences, studied mistletoes. Gil, Frank, and Gordon Wallis updated the list of western forest diseases, and Gil included brown felt blight, “bear wipe,” a disease of conifers caused by Neopeckia coulteri Neopeckia or Herpotrichia juniperi (Frank G. Hawksworth, Robert L. Gilbertson, and Gordon W. Wallis, 1984).

Gil wrote several books with L. Ryvarden including North American Polypores; Vol. I & Vol. II , European Polypores European Polypores Vol. I & Vol. II . Gil wrote Basidiomycetes on aspen with Page Lindsey and another book authored by Gil: Fungi that decay ponderosa pine

Gil spoke with a broad group of mycologists and botanists; he on many occasions identified wood rotters over the telephone with the synoptic key he thought of. Gil has a legacy of papers, a herbarium specialized in wood-decaying fungi and a group of students and collaborators.

Jack Rogers said, “He was the best field mycologist that I have known."

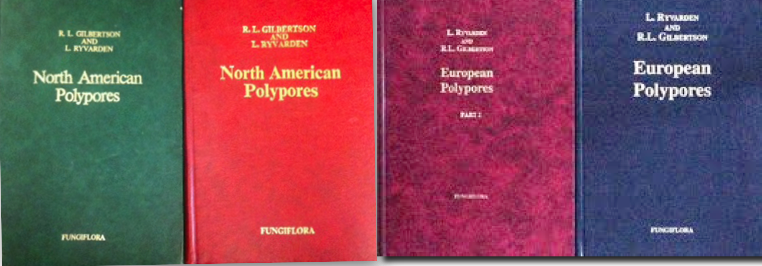
Two volumes each of European and North American Polypores by Gilbertson and Leif Ryvarden

== Selected publications ==
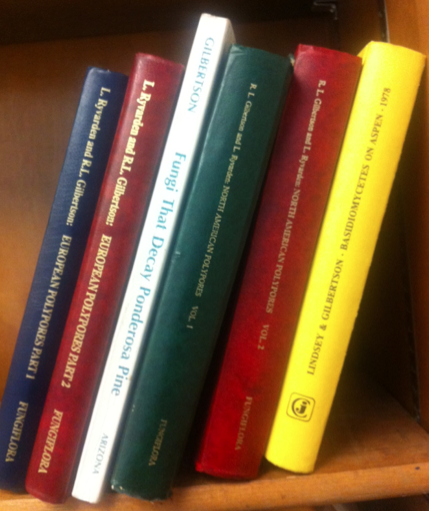
Published books by Gilbertson and colleagues

- Robert L. Gilbertson. Wood-Rotting Fungi of North America. Mycologia, Vol. 72, No. 1 (Jan. - Feb., 1980), pp. 1–49
- Gilbertson and Ryvarden. European polypores. Vol. I. Oslo, Norway: Fungiflora
- Gilbertson and Ryvarden. European polypores. Vol. II. Oslo, Norway: Fungiflora
- Lindsey, J.P. and Gilbertson, R.L. Basidiomycetes That Decay Aspen in North America Mycologia, Vol. 71, No. 1 (Jan. - Feb., 1979), pp. 229–231
- Gilbertson R.L., Cummins G.B., Darnall E.D.. Indexes to W. G. Solheim's Mycoflora Saximontanensis Exsiccata [Rocky Mountain fungi, including plant pathogens and their hosts, USA].. Mycotaxon. 1979; 10
- Gilbertson and Ryvarden. North American Polypores: Vol. 1; 1986 Oslo, Norway: Fungiflora
- Gilbertson and Ryvarden. North American Polypores: Vol. 2; 1986 Oslo, Norway: Fungiflora
- Gilbertson, R.L. and D. E. Hemmes. 1997. Notes on fungi on Hawaiian tree ferns. Mycotoxon 62:465-487.
- Bigelow, D.M., M.E. Matheron, and R. L. Gilbertson. 1996. Biology and control of Coniophora eremophila on lemon trees in Arizona. Plant Disease 80:934-939.
- Gilbertson, R.L. 1995. Taxonomy and nomenclature of Polyporoid Hymenochaetaceae with special reference to Phellinus weirii and related species. Proc. 43rd Ann. West Int. Forest Dis. Work Conf. p. 6-14.
- Alleman, B.C., B.E. Logan and R.L. Gilbertson. 1995. Degradation of pentachlorophenol by fixed films of white rot fungi in rotating tube bioreactors. Water Research 29:61-67.
- Adaskaveg, J.E., R.L. Gilbertson, and M.E. Dunlap. 1995. Effects of incubation time and temperature on in vitro delignification of silver leaf oak by Ganoderma colossum. Appl. Environ. Microbiol. 61:38-144.
