= Freedom in the World =

Annual survey by Freedom House

2026*

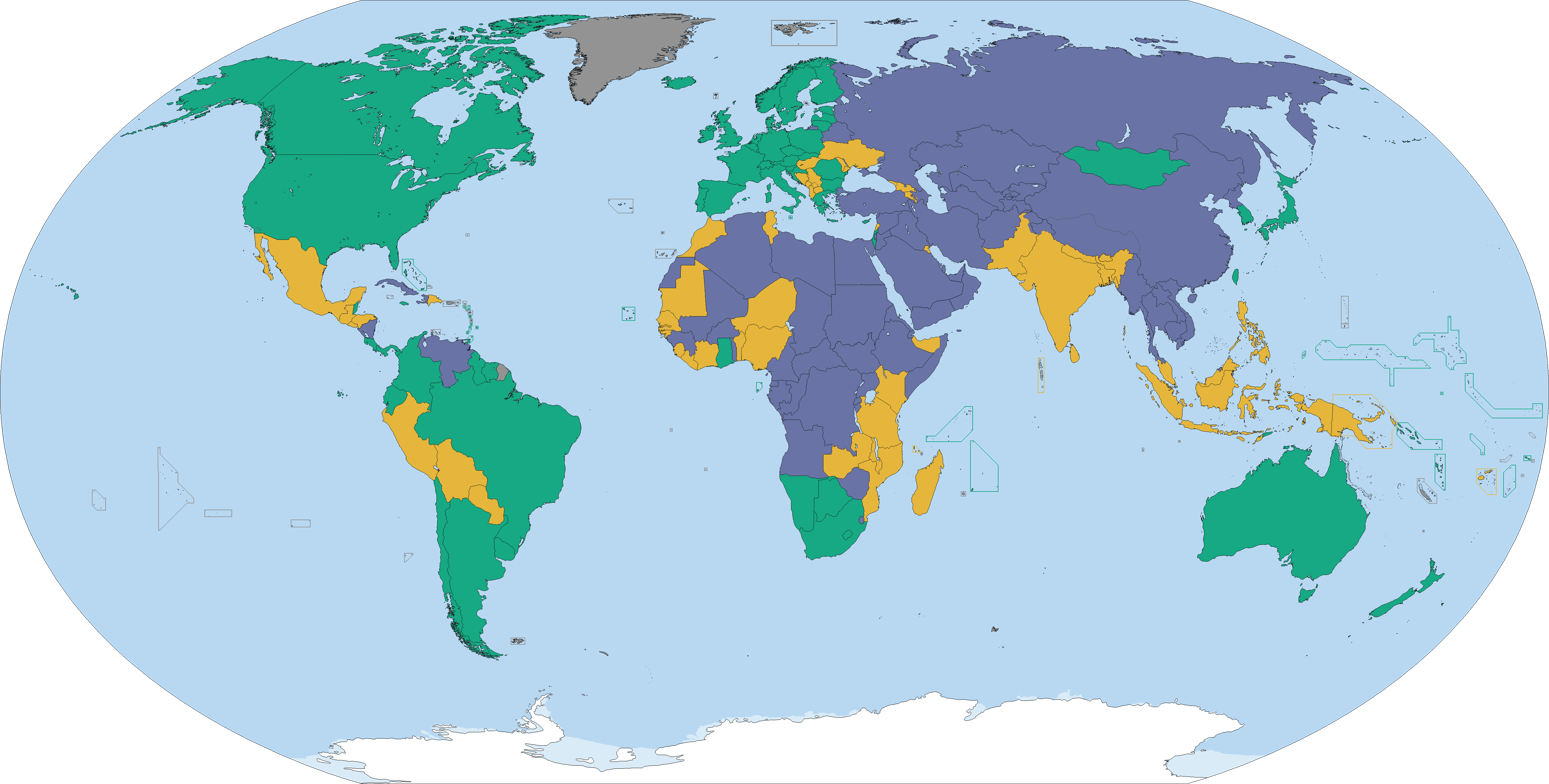
2022

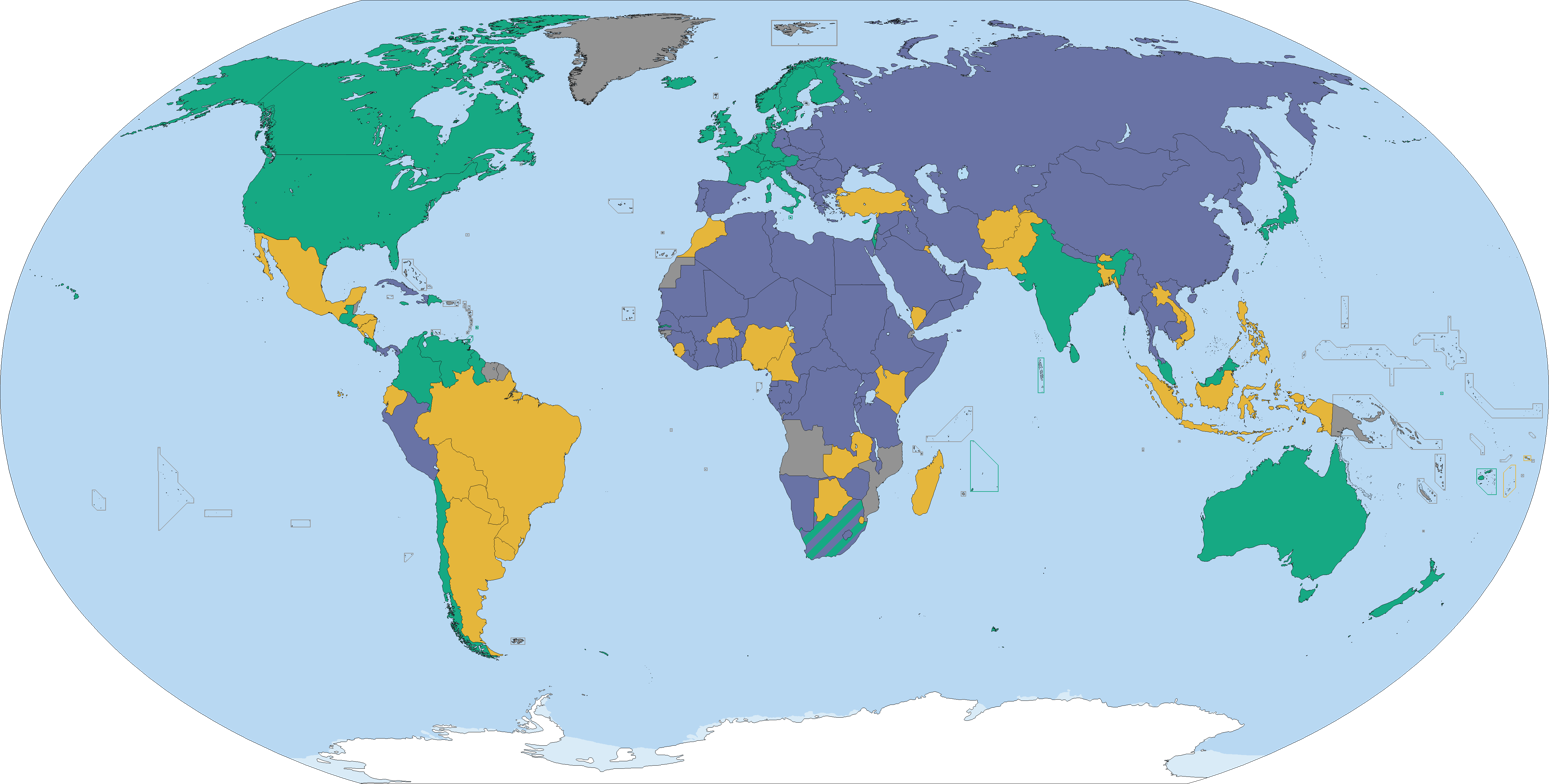
1972
Free Partly free Not free Not covered

Freedom in the World is a yearly survey and report by the U.S.-based non-governmental organization Freedom House that measures the degree of civil liberties and political rights in every nation and significant related and disputed territories around the world.

Critical assessments of the survey have highlighted potential biases stemming from its funding, methodology, ideological leanings and the subjective nature of the scoring. Freedom House has defended its ratings as independent and evidence-based.

== Origin and use ==
Freedom in the World was launched in 1973 by Raymond Gastil. It produces annual scores representing the levels of political rights and civil liberties in each state and territory, on a scale from 1 (most free) to 7 (least free). Depending on the ratings, the nations are then classified as "Free", "Partly Free", or "Not Free". The report is often used by researchers in order to measure democracy and correlates highly with several other measures of democracy such as the Polity data series.

The Freedom House rankings are widely reported in the media and used as sources by political researchers. Their construction and use has been evaluated by critics and supporters.

== Country and territory assessments ==
Countries designated "electoral democracies" in Freedom House's Freedom in the World 2026 survey, covering the year 2025

=== Methodology ===
Together with descriptive texts, Freedom in the World reports assign each country and territory "scores", "ratings", and a "status", as well as determining whether or not it is an "electoral democracy". Ratings are derived from scores, and status, in turn, is derived from ratings. Each report covers the year prior to its publication.

==== Countries and territories ====
The 2026 edition covered 195 "countries" (the 193 UN member states, as well as Kosovo and Taiwan), and 13 "territories". Freedom House states that it "typically takes no position on territorial or separatist disputes as such, focusing instead on the level of political rights and civil liberties in a given geographical area". Its selection of territories for assessment is officially based on several parameters:

- separate governance;
- unique conditions which mean an assessment is likely to yield different ratings from "the relevant country or countries";
- pressure for a change in political status, such as "autonomy, independence, or incorporation into another country";
- stability that would allow assessment of a full, single year, as well as expectation of stability over future years that would allow comparisons over time;
- size and/or political significance.

==== Scores ====
Each country and territory is awarded a "score" of 0 to 4 for each of 25 indicators. 10 of the indicators are for "political rights" (PR), and 15 are for "civil liberties" (CL). Therefore, the total CL score can be between 0 and 60, while the PR score, where 1 to 4 points can be deducted on the basis of an additional discretionary question, can range from -4 and 40. This means that the lowest total score possible (meaning the least freedom) is -4, and the highest (meaning most freedom) is 100.

Before the 2018 report, there was another additional discretionary question, which could be used to award 1 to 4 points to "traditional monarchies that had no political parties or significant electoral processes but provided for some form of consultation with the public". The assessment of this kind of consultation is now done elsewhere in the methodology.

==== Ratings and status ====
Each country and territory also receives two "ratings" ranging from 1 to 7, one for PR and one for CL, with 1 meaning the most possible freedom, and 7 meaning the least. The ratings are derived from the scores. The average of each pair of ratings determines the overall "status" of "Free" (1.0–2.5), "Partly Free" (3.0–5.0), or "Not Free" (5.5–7.0). While the formula for converting scores into status remains the same, since 2020 the reports have started to put less of an emphasis on the ratings, though they can still be accessed in the raw data.

==== Electoral democracy ====
Under the reports' methodology, to qualify as an "electoral democracy" a country (territories are not included in this list) must have a score of 7 or more out of 12 in political rights subcategory A (Electoral Progress), an overall aggregate score of 20 or more in their political rights rating, and (since 2018) an overall aggregate score of 30 or more in their civil liberties rating.

Freedom House's term "electoral democracy" differs from "liberal democracy" in that the latter also implies the presence of a substantial array of civil liberties and a robust observance of democratic ideals. In the survey, most Free countries could qualify as both electoral and liberal democracies. By contrast, some Partly Free countries qualify as electoral, but not liberal, democracies.

=== Assessments ===
* indicates "Civil liberties in country or territory" or "Human rights in country or territory" links.

PR = political rights, CL = civil liberties

==== 2024 countries (according to Freedom House) ====
Country (2024)
| Country (2024) | Electoral democracy | PR rating | CL rating | Total | PR | CL | Overall status |
|---|---|---|---|---|---|---|---|
| Afghanistan | No | 7 | 7 | 6 | 1 | 5 | Not free |
| Albania | Yes | 3 | 3 | 68 | 28 | 40 | Partly free |
| Algeria | No | 6 | 5 | 31 | 10 | 21 | Not free |
| Andorra | Yes | 1 | 1 | 93 | 38 | 55 | Free |
| Angola | No | 6 | 5 | 28 | 10 | 18 | Not free |
| Antigua and Barbuda | Yes | 2 | 2 | 83 | 32 | 51 | Free |
| Argentina | Yes | 2 | 2 | 85 | 35 | 50 | Free |
| Armenia | Yes | 4 | 4 | 54 | 23 | 31 | Partly free |
| Australia | Yes | 1 | 1 | 95 | 39 | 56 | Free |
| Austria | Yes | 1 | 1 | 93 | 37 | 56 | Free |
| Azerbaijan | No | 7 | 7 | 7 | 0 | 7 | Not free |
| Bahamas | Yes | 1 | 2 | 90 | 38 | 52 | Free |
| Bahrain | No | 7 | 6 | 12 | 2 | 10 | Not free |
| Bangladesh | No | 5 | 4 | 45 | 16 | 29 | Partly free |
| Barbados | Yes | 1 | 1 | 94 | 37 | 57 | Free |
| Belarus | No | 7 | 7 | 7 | 1 | 6 | Not free |
| Belgium | Yes | 1 | 1 | 96 | 39 | 57 | Free |
| Belize | Yes | 2 | 1 | 88 | 35 | 53 | Free |
| Benin | No | 4 | 3 | 60 | 18 | 42 | Partly free |
| Bhutan | Yes | 2 | 3 | 68 | 32 | 36 | Free |
| Bolivia | Yes | 3 | 3 | 65 | 26 | 39 | Partly free |
| Bosnia and Herzegovina | No | 5 | 3 | 52 | 17 | 35 | Partly free |
| Botswana | Yes | 2 | 2 | 75 | 31 | 44 | Free |
| Brazil | Yes | 2 | 3 | 72 | 30 | 42 | Free |
| Brunei | No | 6 | 5 | 27 | 7 | 20 | Not free |
| Bulgaria | Yes | 2 | 2 | 77 | 32 | 45 | Free |
| Burkina Faso | No | 7 | 5 | 25 | 3 | 22 | Not free |
| Burundi | No | 7 | 6 | 15 | 4 | 11 | Not free |
| Cambodia | No | 7 | 5 | 23 | 4 | 19 | Not free |
| Cameroon | No | 6 | 6 | 15 | 6 | 9 | Not free |
| Canada | Yes | 1 | 1 | 97 | 39 | 58 | Free |
| Cape Verde | Yes | 1 | 1 | 92 | 38 | 54 | Free |
| Central African Republic | No | 7 | 7 | 5 | 1 | 4 | Not free |
| Chad | No | 7 | 6 | 15 | 1 | 14 | Not free |
| Chile | Yes | 1 | 1 | 95 | 38 | 57 | Free |
| China | No | 7 | 6 | 9 | -2 | 11 | Not free |
| Colombia | Yes | 2 | 3 | 70 | 31 | 39 | Free |
| Comoros | No | 5 | 4 | 42 | 16 | 26 | Partly free |
| Congo (Democratic Republic) | No | 7 | 6 | 18 | 4 | 14 | Not free |
| Congo (Republic) | No | 7 | 6 | 17 | 2 | 15 | Not free |
| Costa Rica | Yes | 1 | 1 | 91 | 38 | 53 | Free |
| Croatia | Yes | 2 | 2 | 82 | 34 | 48 | Free |
| Cuba | No | 7 | 6 | 10 | 1 | 9 | Not free |
| Cyprus | Yes | 1 | 1 | 91 | 38 | 53 | Free |
| Czech Republic | Yes | 1 | 1 | 95 | 37 | 58 | Free |
| Denmark | Yes | 1 | 1 | 97 | 40 | 57 | Free |
| Djibouti | No | 7 | 5 | 24 | 5 | 19 | Not free |
| Dominica | Yes | 1 | 1 | 92 | 37 | 55 | Free |
| Dominican Republic | Yes | 3 | 3 | 68 | 27 | 41 | Partly free |
| Ecuador | Yes | 3 | 3 | 65 | 28 | 37 | Partly free |
| Egypt | No | 6 | 6 | 18 | 6 | 12 | Not free |
| El Salvador | No | 5 | 4 | 47 | 17 | 30 | Partly free |
| Equatorial Guinea | No | 7 | 7 | 5 | 0 | 5 | Not free |
| Eritrea | No | 7 | 7 | 3 | 1 | 2 | Not free |
| Estonia | Yes | 1 | 1 | 96 | 39 | 57 | Free |
| Eswatini | No | 7 | 6 | 17 | 1 | 16 | Not free |
| Ethiopia | No | 6 | 6 | 18 | 8 | 10 | Not free |
| Fiji | Yes | 3 | 3 | 69 | 28 | 41 | Partly free |
| Finland | Yes | 1 | 1 | 100 | 40 | 60 | Free |
| France | Yes | 1 | 2 | 89 | 38 | 51 | Free |
| Gabon | No | 7 | 5 | 21 | 2 | 19 | Not free |
| The Gambia | No | 4 | 4 | 50 | 22 | 28 | Partly free |
| Georgia | No | 4 | 4 | 55 | 21 | 34 | Partly free |
| Germany | Yes | 1 | 1 | 95 | 40 | 55 | Free |
| Ghana | Yes | 2 | 2 | 80 | 35 | 45 | Free |
| Greece | Yes | 2 | 2 | 85 | 35 | 50 | Free |
| Grenada | Yes | 1 | 2 | 89 | 37 | 52 | Free |
| Guatemala | No | 4 | 4 | 48 | 19 | 29 | Partly free |
| Guinea | No | 6 | 5 | 30 | 7 | 23 | Not free |
| Guinea-Bissau | No | 5 | 4 | 41 | 15 | 26 | Partly free |
| Guyana | Yes | 2 | 2 | 74 | 30 | 44 | Free |
| Haiti | No | 6 | 5 | 24 | 6 | 18 | Not free |
| Honduras | No | 4 | 4 | 48 | 22 | 26 | Partly free |
| Hungary | Yes | 3 | 3 | 65 | 24 | 41 | Partly free |
| Iceland | Yes | 1 | 1 | 95 | 38 | 57 | Free |
| India | Yes | 2 | 4 | 63 | 31 | 32 | Partly free |
| Indonesia | No | 3 | 4 | 56 | 28 | 28 | Partly free |
| Iran | No | 7 | 7 | 11 | 4 | 7 | Not free |
| Iraq | No | 5 | 6 | 31 | 16 | 15 | Not free |
| Ireland | Yes | 1 | 1 | 97 | 39 | 58 | Free |
| Israel | Yes | 2 | 3 | 73 | 34 | 39 | Free |
| Italy | Yes | 1 | 1 | 89 | 36 | 53 | Free |
| Ivory Coast | No | 4 | 4 | 49 | 19 | 30 | Partly free |
| Jamaica | Yes | 2 | 2 | 80 | 33 | 47 | Free |
| Japan | Yes | 1 | 1 | 96 | 40 | 56 | Free |
| Jordan | No | 5 | 5 | 34 | 12 | 22 | Partly free |
| Kazakhstan | No | 7 | 5 | 23 | 5 | 18 | Not free |
| Kenya | No | 4 | 4 | 51 | 22 | 29 | Partly free |
| Kiribati | Yes | 1 | 1 | 89 | 36 | 53 | Free |
| Kosovo | Yes | 3 | 4 | 60 | 28 | 32 | Partly free |
| Kuwait | No | 6 | 5 | 31 | 7 | 14 | Not free |
| Kyrgyzstan | No | 7 | 5 | 26 | 4 | 22 | Not free |
| Laos | No | 7 | 6 | 13 | 2 | 11 | Not free |
| Latvia | Yes | 1 | 2 | 89 | 37 | 52 | Free |
| Lebanon | No | 5 | 4 | 39 | 13 | 26 | Partly free |
| Lesotho | Yes | 2 | 3 | 66 | 30 | 36 | Free |
| Liberia | Yes | 2 | 4 | 64 | 30 | 34 | Partly free |
| Libya | No | 7 | 6 | 10 | 2 | 8 | Not free |
| Liechtenstein | Yes | 2 | 1 | 90 | 33 | 57 | Free |
| Lithuania | Yes | 1 | 2 | 89 | 38 | 51 | Free |
| Luxembourg | Yes | 1 | 1 | 97 | 38 | 59 | Free |
| Madagascar | No | 4 | 4 | 55 | 21 | 34 | Partly free |
| Malawi | Yes | 3 | 3 | 65 | 28 | 37 | Partly free |
| Malaysia | No | 4 | 4 | 53 | 22 | 31 | Partly free |
| Maldives | No | 4 | 5 | 43 | 20 | 23 | Partly free |
| Mali | No | 6 | 5 | 24 | 6 | 18 | Not free |
| Malta | Yes | 2 | 2 | 87 | 35 | 52 | Free |
| Marshall Islands | Yes | 1 | 1 | 93 | 38 | 55 | Free |
| Mauritania | No | 5 | 5 | 39 | 15 | 24 | Partly free |
| Mauritius | Yes | 2 | 2 | 86 | 35 | 51 | Free |
| Mexico | Yes | 3 | 4 | 59 | 26 | 33 | Partly free |
| Micronesia | Yes | 1 | 1 | 92 | 37 | 55 | Free |
| Moldova | Yes | 3 | 3 | 60 | 25 | 35 | Partly free |
| Monaco | Yes | 3 | 1 | 82 | 25 | 57 | Free |
| Mongolia | Yes | 1 | 2 | 84 | 36 | 48 | Free |
| Montenegro | Yes | 3 | 3 | 69 | 27 | 42 | Partly free |
| Morocco | No | 5 | 5 | 37 | 13 | 24 | Partly free |
| Mozambique | No | 5 | 4 | 41 | 12 | 29 | Partly free |
| Myanmar | No | 7 | 7 | 7 | 0 | 7 | Not free |
| Namibia | Yes | 3 | 2 | 73 | 28 | 45 | Free |
| Nauru | Yes | 2 | 3 | 75 | 32 | 43 | Free |
| Nepal | Yes | 3 | 4 | 62 | 28 | 34 | Partly free |
| Netherlands | Yes | 1 | 1 | 97 | 39 | 58 | Free |
| New Zealand | Yes | 1 | 1 | 99 | 40 | 59 | Free |
| Nicaragua | No | 7 | 6 | 14 | 2 | 12 | Not free |
| Niger | No | 7 | 5 | 30 | 5 | 25 | Not free |
| Nigeria | No | 4 | 5 | 44 | 20 | 24 | Partly free |
| North Korea | No | 7 | 7 | 3 | 0 | 3 | Not free |
| North Macedonia | Yes | 3 | 3 | 67 | 28 | 39 | Partly free |
| Norway | Yes | 1 | 1 | 99 | 39 | 60 | Free |
| Oman | No | 6 | 5 | 24 | 6 | 18 | Not free |
| Pakistan | No | 5 | 5 | 32 | 12 | 20 | Partly free |
| Palau | Yes | 1 | 1 | 92 | 37 | 55 | Free |
| Panama | Yes | 2 | 2 | 83 | 35 | 48 | Free |
| Papua New Guinea | No | 4 | 3 | 61 | 22 | 39 | Partly free |
| Paraguay | Yes | 3 | 3 | 63 | 26 | 37 | Partly free |
| Peru | Yes | 3 | 3 | 67 | 28 | 39 | Partly free |
| Philippines | Yes | 3 | 4 | 58 | 25 | 33 | Partly free |
| Poland | Yes | 2 | 2 | 82 | 34 | 48 | Free |
| Portugal | Yes | 1 | 1 | 96 | 39 | 57 | Free |
| Qatar | No | 6 | 5 | 25 | 7 | 18 | Not free |
| Romania | Yes | 2 | 2 | 82 | 34 | 48 | Free |
| Russia | No | 7 | 6 | 12 | 4 | 8 | Not free |
| Rwanda | No | 6 | 6 | 21 | 7 | 14 | Not free |
| Samoa | Yes | 2 | 2 | 84 | 32 | 52 | Free |
| San Marino | Yes | 1 | 1 | 97 | 39 | 58 | Free |
| São Tomé and Príncipe | Yes | 2 | 2 | 84 | 35 | 49 | Free |
| Saudi Arabia | No | 7 | 6 | 9 | 1 | 8 | Not free |
| Senegal | Yes | 2 | 3 | 69 | 30 | 39 | Free |
| Serbia | No | 4 | 3 | 56 | 18 | 38 | Partly free |
| Seychelles | Yes | 2 | 2 | 80 | 34 | 46 | Free |
| Sierra Leone | Yes | 4 | 3 | 59 | 23 | 36 | Partly free |
| Singapore | No | 4 | 4 | 48 | 19 | 29 | Partly free |
| Slovakia | Yes | 1 | 1 | 89 | 36 | 53 | Free |
| Slovenia | Yes | 1 | 1 | 96 | 39 | 57 | Free |
| Solomon Islands | Yes | 3 | 2 | 75 | 28 | 47 | Free |
| Somalia | No | 7 | 7 | 8 | 2 | 6 | Not free |
| South Africa | Yes | 2 | 2 | 81 | 34 | 47 | Free |
| South Korea | Yes | 2 | 2 | 81 | 32 | 49 | Free |
| South Sudan | No | 7 | 7 | 1 | -3 | 4 | Not free |
| Spain | Yes | 1 | 1 | 90 | 37 | 53 | Free |
| Sri Lanka | Yes | 3 | 4 | 58 | 26 | 32 | Partly free |
| Saint Kitts and Nevis | Yes | 2 | 1 | 89 | 35 | 54 | Free |
| Saint Lucia | Yes | 1 | 1 | 91 | 38 | 53 | Free |
| Saint Vincent and the Grenadines | Yes | 1 | 1 | 90 | 36 | 54 | Free |
| Sudan | No | 7 | 7 | 2 | -3 | 5 | Not free |
| Suriname | Yes | 2 | 2 | 80 | 34 | 46 | Free |
| Sweden | Yes | 1 | 1 | 99 | 40 | 59 | Free |
| Switzerland | Yes | 1 | 1 | 96 | 39 | 57 | Free |
| Syria | No | 7 | 6 | 5 | -3 | 8 | Not free |
| Taiwan | Yes | 1 | 1 | 94 | 38 | 56 | Free |
| Tajikistan | No | 7 | 7 | 5 | 0 | 5 | Not free |
| Tanzania | No | 6 | 5 | 35 | 11 | 24 | Not free |
| Thailand | No | 6 | 5 | 34 | 11 | 23 | Not free |
| Timor-Leste | Yes | 2 | 3 | 72 | 33 | 39 | Free |
| Togo | No | 5 | 4 | 41 | 14 | 27 | Partly free |
| Tonga | Yes | 2 | 2 | 80 | 30 | 50 | Free |
| Trinidad and Tobago | Yes | 2 | 2 | 82 | 33 | 49 | Free |
| Tunisia | No | 6 | 4 | 44 | 11 | 33 | Partly free |
| Turkey | No | 5 | 6 | 33 | 17 | 16 | Not free |
| Turkmenistan | No | 7 | 7 | 1 | 0 | 1 | Not free |
| Tuvalu | Yes | 1 | 1 | 93 | 37 | 56 | Free |
| Uganda | No | 6 | 5 | 34 | 10 | 24 | Not free |
| Ukraine | No | 4 | 4 | 51 | 23 | 28 | Partly free |
| United Arab Emirates | No | 7 | 6 | 18 | 5 | 13 | Not free |
| United Kingdom | Yes | 1 | 1 | 92 | 39 | 53 | Free |
| United States | Yes | 2 | 2 | 84 | 34 | 50 | Free |
| Uruguay | Yes | 1 | 1 | 96 | 40 | 56 | Free |
| Uzbekistan | No | 7 | 6 | 12 | 2 | 10 | Not free |
| Vanuatu | Yes | 2 | 2 | 82 | 32 | 50 | Free |
| Venezuela | No | 7 | 6 | 13 | 0 | 13 | Not free |
| Vietnam | No | 7 | 6 | 20 | 4 | 16 | Not free |
| Yemen | No | 7 | 6 | 10 | 1 | 9 | Not free |
| Zambia | No | 4 | 4 | 53 | 22 | 31 | Partly free |
| Zimbabwe | No | 6 | 5 | 26 | 9 | 17 | Not free |

==== 2024 territories (according to Freedom House) ====
Territory (2024)
| Territory (2024) | Total | PR | CL | Overall status |
|---|---|---|---|---|
| Abkhazia | 39 | 17 | 22 | Partly free |
| Gaza Strip | 2 | -2 | 4 | Not free |
| Hong Kong | 40 | 9 | 31 | Partly free |
| Indian Kashmir | 38 | 17 | 21 | Partly free |
| Northern Cyprus | 76 | 27 | 49 | Free |
| Pakistani Kashmir | 30 | 9 | 21 | Not free |
| Russian-occupied Ukraine | 2 | -1 | 3 | Not free |
| Somaliland | 47 | 21 | 26 | Partly free |
| South Ossetia | 12 | 3 | 9 | Not free |
| Tibet | 0 | -2 | 2 | Not free |
| Transnistria | 17 | 5 | 12 | Not free |
| West Bank | 22 | 4 | 18 | Not free |
| Western Sahara | 4 | -3 | 7 | Not free |

==== Before 2024 ====
| Country | 2018 | | | | 2019 | | | | 2020 | | | | 2021 | | | | 2022 | | | | 2023 | | | |
| Country | PR | CL | Overall status | Pts | PR | CL | Overall status | Pts | PR | CL | Overall status | Pts | PR | CL | Overall status | Pts | PR | CL | Overall status | Pts | PR | CL | Overall status | Pts |
|---|---|---|---|---|---|---|---|---|---|---|---|---|---|---|---|---|---|---|---|---|---|---|---|---|
| Afghanistan * | 5 | 6 | Not | 27 | 5 | 6 | Not | 27 | 5 | 6 | Not | 27 | 7 | 7 | Not | 2 | | | | | | | | |
| Albania * | 3 | 3 | Partly | 68 | 3 | 3 | Partly | 67 | 3 | 3 | Partly | 66 | 3 | 3 | Partly | 67 | | | | | | | | |
| Algeria * | 6 | 5 | Not | 34 | 6 | 5 | Not | 34 | 6 | 5 | Not | 32 | 6 | 5 | Not | 32 | | | | | | | | |
| Andorra * | 1 | 1 | Free | 94 | 1 | 1 | Free | 94 | 1 | 1 | Free | 93 | 1 | 1 | Free | 93 | | | | | | | | |
| Angola * | 6 | 5 | Not | 31 | 6 | 5 | Not | 32 | 6 | 5 | Not | 31 | 6 | 5 | Not | 30 | | | | | | | | |
| Antigua and Barbuda * | 2 | 2 | Free | 84 | 2 | 2 | Free | 85 | 2 | 2 | Free | 85 | 2 | 2 | Free | 85 | | | | | | | | |
| Argentina * | 2 | 2 | Free | 84 | 2 | 2 | Free | 85 | 2 | 2 | Free | 84 | 2 | 2 | Free | 84 | | | | | | | | |
| Armenia * | 4 | 4 | Partly | 51 | 4 | 4 | Partly | 53 | 4 | 4 | Partly | 55 | 4 | 4 | Partly | 55 | | | | | | | | |
| Australia * | 1 | 1 | Free | 98 | 1 | 1 | Free | 97 | 1 | 1 | Free | 97 | 1 | 1 | Free | 95 | | | | | | | | |
| Austria * | 1 | 1 | Free | 93 | 1 | 1 | Free | 93 | 1 | 1 | Free | 93 | 1 | 1 | Free | 93 | | | | | | | | |
| Azerbaijan * | 7 | 6 | Not | 11 | 7 | 6 | Not | 10 | 7 | 6 | Not | 10 | 7 | 6 | Not | 9 | | | | | | | | |
| Bahamas | 1 | 1 | Free | 91 | 1 | 1 | Free | 91 | 1 | 1 | Free | 91 | 1 | 1 | Free | 91 | | | | | | | | |
| Bahrain * | 7 | 6 | Not | 12 | 7 | 6 | Not | 11 | 7 | 6 | Not | 12 | 7 | 6 | Not | 12 | | | | | | | | |
| Bangladesh * | 5 | 5 | Partly | 41 | 5 | 5 | Partly | 39 | 5 | 5 | Partly | 39 | 5 | 5 | Partly | 39 | | | | | | | | |
| Barbados | 1 | 1 | Free | 96 | 1 | 1 | Free | 95 | 1 | 1 | Free | 95 | 1 | 1 | Free | 95 | | | | | | | | |
| Belarus * | 7 | 6 | Not | 19 | 7 | 6 | Not | 19 | 7 | 6 | Not | 11 | 7 | 7 | Not | 8 | | | | | | | | |
| Belgium * | 1 | 1 | Free | 96 | 1 | 1 | Free | 96 | 1 | 1 | Free | 96 | 1 | 1 | Free | 96 | | | | | | | | |
| Belize * | 1 | 2 | Free | 86 | 2 | 2 | Free | 86 | 2 | 1 | Free | 87 | 2 | 1 | Free | 87 | | | | | | | | |
| Benin * | 2 | 2 | Free | 79 | 4 | 2 | Partly | 66 | 4 | 2 | Partly | 65 | 5 | 3 | Partly | 59 | | | | | | | | |
| Bhutan * | 3 | 4 | Partly | 59 | 3 | 4 | Partly | 59 | 2 | 4 | Partly | 61 | 3 | 4 | Partly | 61 | | | | | | | | |
| Bolivia * | 3 | 3 | Partly | 67 | 3 | 3 | Partly | 63 | 3 | 3 | Partly | 66 | 3 | 3 | Partly | 66 | | | | | | | | |
| Bosnia and Herzegovina * | 4 | 4 | Partly | 53 | 4 | 4 | Partly | 53 | 4 | 4 | Partly | 53 | 4 | 4 | Partly | 53 | | | | | | | | |
| Botswana * | 3 | 2 | Free | 72 | 3 | 2 | Free | 72 | 3 | 2 | Free | 72 | 3 | 2 | Free | 72 | | | | | | | | |
| Brazil * | 2 | 2 | Free | 75 | 2 | 2 | Free | 75 | 2 | 3 | Free | 74 | 2 | 3 | Free | 73 | | | | | | | | |
| Brunei * | 6 | 5 | Not | 29 | 6 | 5 | Not | 28 | 6 | 5 | Not | 28 | 6 | 5 | Not | 28 | | | | | | | | |
| Bulgaria * | 2 | 2 | Free | 80 | 2 | 2 | Free | 80 | 2 | 2 | Free | 78 | 2 | 2 | Free | 79 | | | | | | | | |
| Burkina Faso * | 4 | 3 | Partly | 60 | 4 | 4 | Partly | 56 | 4 | 4 | Partly | 54 | 4 | 4 | Partly | 53 | | | | | | | | |
| Burundi * | 7 | 6 | Not | 14 | 7 | 6 | Not | 13 | 7 | 6 | Not | 14 | 7 | 6 | Not | 14 | | | | | | | | |
| Cambodia * | 6 | 5 | Not | 26 | 7 | 5 | Not | 25 | 7 | 5 | Not | 24 | 7 | 5 | Not | 24 | | | | | | | | |
| Cameroon * | 6 | 6 | Not | 19 | 6 | 6 | Not | 18 | 6 | 6 | Not | 16 | 6 | 6 | Not | 15 | | | | | | | | |
| Canada * | 1 | 1 | Free | 99 | 1 | 1 | Free | 98 | 1 | 1 | Free | 98 | 1 | 1 | Free | 98 | | | | | | | | |
| Cape Verde * | 1 | 1 | Free | 90 | 1 | 1 | Free | 92 | 1 | 1 | Free | 92 | 1 | 1 | Free | 92 | | | | | | | | |
| Central African Republic * | 7 | 7 | Not | 9 | 7 | 7 | Not | 10 | 7 | 7 | Not | 9 | 7 | 7 | Not | 7 | | | | | | | | |
| Chad * | 7 | 6 | Not | 17 | 7 | 6 | Not | 17 | 7 | 6 | Not | 17 | 7 | 6 | Not | 15 | | | | | | | | |
| Chile * | 1 | 1 | Free | 94 | 1 | 2 | Free | 90 | 1 | 1 | Free | 93 | 1 | 1 | Free | 94 | | | | | | | | |
| China * | 7 | 6 | Not | 11 | 7 | 6 | Not | 10 | 7 | 6 | Not | 9 | 7 | 6 | Not | 9 | | | | | | | | |
| Colombia * | 3 | 3 | Partly | 66 | 3 | 3 | Partly | 66 | 3 | 3 | Partly | 65 | 3 | 3 | Partly | 64 | | | | | | | | |
| Comoros * | 4 | 4 | Partly | 50 | 4 | 4 | Partly | 44 | 5 | 4 | Partly | 42 | 5 | 4 | Partly | 42 | | | | | | | | |
| DR Congo * | 7 | 6 | Not | 15 | 7 | 6 | Not | 18 | 7 | 6 | Not | 20 | | | | | | | | | | | | |
| Congo * | 7 | 5 | Not | 21 | 7 | 5 | Not | 20 | 7 | 5 | Not | 20 | | | | | | | | | | | | |
| Costa Rica * | 1 | 1 | Free | 91 | 1 | 1 | Free | 91 | 1 | 1 | Free | 91 | | | | | | | | | | | | |
| Croatia * | 1 | 2 | Free | 85 | 1 | 2 | Free | 85 | 1 | 2 | Free | 85 | | | | | | | | | | | | |
| Cuba * | 7 | 6 | Not | 14 | 7 | 6 | Not | 14 | 7 | 6 | Not | 13 | | | | | | | | | | | | |
| Cyprus * | 1 | 1 | Free | 94 | 1 | 1 | Free | 94 | 1 | 1 | Free | 94 | | | | | | | | | | | | |
| Czech Republic * | 1 | 1 | Free | 91 | 1 | 1 | Free | 91 | 1 | 1 | Free | 91 | | | | | | | | | | | | |
| Denmark * | 1 | 1 | Free | 97 | 1 | 1 | Free | 97 | 1 | 1 | Free | 97 | | | | | | | | | | | | |
| Djibouti * | 6 | 5 | Not | 26 | 7 | 5 | Not | 24 | 7 | 5 | Not | 24 | | | | | | | | | | | | |
| Dominica | 1 | 1 | Free | 93 | 1 | 1 | Free | 93 | 1 | 1 | Free | 93 | | | | | | | | | | | | |
| Dominican Republic * | 3 | 3 | Partly | 67 | 3 | 3 | Partly | 67 | 3 | 3 | Partly | 67 | | | | | | | | | | | | |
| Ecuador * | 3 | 3 | Partly | 63 | 3 | 3 | Partly | 65 | 3 | 3 | Partly | 67 | | | | | | | | | | | | |
| Egypt * | 6 | 6 | Not | 22 | 6 | 6 | Not | 21 | 6 | 6 | Not | 18 | | | | | | | | | | | | |
| El Salvador * | 2 | 3 | Free | 67 | 2 | 4 | Partly | 66 | 2 | 4 | Partly | 63 | | | | | | | | | | | | |
| Equatorial Guinea * | 7 | 7 | Not | 6 | 7 | 7 | Not | 6 | 7 | 7 | Not | 5 | | | | | | | | | | | | |
| Eritrea * | 7 | 7 | Not | 2 | 7 | 7 | Not | 2 | 7 | 7 | Not | 2 | | | | | | | | | | | | |
| Estonia * | 1 | 1 | Free | 94 | 1 | 1 | Free | 94 | 1 | 1 | Free | 94 | | | | | | | | | | | | |
| Ethiopia * | 6 | 6 | Not | 19 | 6 | 6 | Not | 24 | 6 | 6 | Not | 22 | | | | | | | | | | | | |
| Eswatini * | 7 | 6 | Not | 16 | 7 | 5 | Not | 19 | 7 | 5 | Not | 19 | | | | | | | | | | | | |
| Fiji * | 3 | 3 | Partly | 61 | 3 | 3 | Partly | 60 | 3 | 3 | Partly | 60 | | | | | | | | | | | | |
| Finland * | 1 | 1 | Free | 100 | 1 | 1 | Free | 100 | 1 | 1 | Free | 100 | | | | | | | | | | | | |
| France * | 1 | 2 | Free | 90 | 1 | 2 | Free | 90 | 1 | 2 | Free | 90 | | | | | | | | | | | | |
| Gabon * | 7 | 5 | Not | 23 | 7 | 5 | Not | 22 | 7 | 5 | Not | 22 | | | | | | | | | | | | |
| Gambia | 4 | 5 | Partly | 45 | 4 | 4 | Partly | 46 | 4 | 4 | Partly | 46 | | | | | | | | | | | | |
| Georgia * | 3 | 3 | Partly | 63 | 3 | 3 | Partly | 61 | 4 | 3 | Partly | 60 | | | | | | | | | | | | |
| Germany * | 1 | 1 | Free | 94 | 1 | 1 | Free | 94 | 1 | 1 | Free | 94 | | | | | | | | | | | | |
| Ghana * | 1 | 2 | Free | 83 | 2 | 2 | Free | 82 | 2 | 2 | Free | 82 | | | | | | | | | | | | |
| Greece * | 1 | 2 | Free | 87 | 1 | 2 | Free | 88 | 1 | 2 | Free | 87 | | | | | | | | | | | | |
| Grenada * | 1 | 2 | Free | 89 | 1 | 2 | Free | 89 | 1 | 2 | Free | 89 | | | | | | | | | | | | |
| Guatemala * | 4 | 4 | Partly | 53 | 4 | 4 | Partly | 52 | 4 | 4 | Partly | 52 | | | | | | | | | | | | |
| Guinea * | 5 | 4 | Partly | 43 | 5 | 5 | Partly | 40 | 5 | 5 | Partly | 38 | | | | | | | | | | | | |
| Guinea-Bissau * | 5 | 4 | Partly | 42 | 5 | 4 | Partly | 46 | 5 | 4 | Partly | 44 | | | | | | | | | | | | |
| Guyana * | 2 | 3 | Free | 75 | 2 | 3 | Free | 74 | 2 | 3 | Free | 73 | | | | | | | | | | | | |
| Haiti * | 5 | 5 | Partly | 41 | 5 | 5 | Partly | 38 | 5 | 5 | Partly | 37 | | | | | | | | | | | | |
| Honduras * | 4 | 4 | Partly | 46 | 4 | 4 | Partly | 45 | 4 | 5 | Partly | 44 | | | | | | | | | | | | |
| Hungary * | 3 | 3 | Partly | 70 | 3 | 3 | Partly | 70 | 3 | 3 | Partly | 69 | | | | | | | | | | | | |
| Iceland * | 1 | 1 | Free | 94 | 1 | 1 | Free | 94 | 1 | 1 | Free | 94 | | | | | | | | | | | | |
| India * | 2 | 3 | Free | 75 | 2 | 3 | Free | 71 | 2 | 4 | Partly | 67 | 2 | 4 | Partly | 66 | | | | | | | | |
| Indonesia * | 2 | 4 | Partly | 62 | 2 | 4 | Partly | 61 | 2 | 4 | Partly | 59 | | | | | | | | | | | | |
| Iran * | 6 | 6 | Not | 18 | 6 | 6 | Not | 17 | 6 | 6 | Not | 16 | | | | | | | | | | | | |
| Iraq * | 5 | 6 | Not | 32 | 5 | 6 | Not | 31 | 5 | 6 | Not | 29 | | | | | | | | | | | | |
| Ireland * | 1 | 1 | Free | 97 | 1 | 1 | Free | 97 | 1 | 1 | Free | 97 | | | | | | | | | | | | |
| Israel * | 2 | 3 | Free | 78 | 2 | 3 | Free | 76 | 2 | 3 | Free | 76 | | | | | | | | | | | | |
| Italy * | 1 | 1 | Free | 89 | 1 | 1 | Free | 89 | 1 | 1 | Free | 90 | | | | | | | | | | | | |
| Ivory Coast * | 4 | 4 | Partly | 51 | 4 | 4 | Partly | 51 | 5 | 4 | Partly | 44 | | | | | | | | | | | | |
| Jamaica * | 2 | 2 | Free | 78 | 2 | 2 | Free | 78 | 2 | 2 | Free | 80 | | | | | | | | | | | | |
| Japan * | 1 | 1 | Free | 96 | 1 | 1 | Free | 96 | 1 | 1 | Free | 96 | | | | | | | | | | | | |
| Jordan * | 5 | 5 | Partly | 37 | 5 | 5 | Partly | 37 | 6 | 5 | Not | 34 | | | | | | | | | | | | |
| Kazakhstan * | 7 | 5 | Not | | 7 | 5 | Not | 23 | 7 | 5 | Not | 23 | | | | | | | | | | | | |
| Kenya * | 4 | 4 | Partly | 48 | 4 | 4 | Partly | 48 | 4 | 4 | Partly | 48 | | | | | | | | | | | | |
| Kiribati * | 1 | 1 | Free | 93 | 1 | 1 | Free | 93 | 1 | 1 | Free | 93 | | | | | | | | | | | | |
| Kosovo * | 3 | 4 | Partly | 54 | 3 | 4 | Partly | 56 | 4 | 4 | Partly | 54 | | | | | | | | | | | | |
| Kuwait * | 5 | 5 | Partly | 36 | 5 | 5 | Partly | 36 | 5 | 5 | Partly | 37 | | | | | | | | | | | | |
| Kyrgyzstan * | 5 | 4 | Partly | 38 | 5 | 4 | Partly | 39 | 7 | 5 | Not | 28 | | | | | | | | | | | | |
| Laos * | 7 | 6 | Not | 14 | 7 | 6 | Not | 14 | 7 | 6 | Not | 13 | | | | | | | | | | | | |
| Latvia * | 2 | 2 | Free | 87 | 1 | 2 | Free | 89 | 1 | 2 | Free | 89 | | | | | | | | | | | | |
| Lebanon * | 5 | 4 | Partly | 45 | 5 | 4 | Partly | 44 | 5 | 4 | Partly | 43 | | | | | | | | | | | | |
| Lesotho * | 3 | 3 | Partly | 63 | 3 | 3 | Partly | 63 | 3 | 3 | Partly | 63 | | | | | | | | | | | | |
| Liberia * | 3 | 3 | Partly | 62 | 3 | 4 | Partly | 60 | 3 | 4 | Partly | 60 | | | | | | | | | | | | |
| Libya * | 7 | 6 | Not | 9 | 7 | 6 | Not | 9 | 7 | 6 | Not | 9 | | | | | | | | | | | | |
| Liechtenstein * | 2 | 1 | Free | 90 | 2 | 1 | Free | 90 | 2 | 1 | Free | 90 | | | | | | | | | | | | |
| Lithuania * | 1 | 1 | Free | 91 | 1 | 1 | Free | 91 | 1 | 2 | Free | 90 | | | | | | | | | | | | |
| Luxembourg | 1 | 1 | Free | 98 | 1 | 1 | Free | 98 | 1 | 1 | Free | 97 | | | | | | | | | | | | |
| Madagascar * | 3 | 4 | Partly | 56 | 3 | 3 | Partly | 61 | 3 | 4 | Partly | 60 | | | | | | | | | | | | |
| Malawi * | 3 | 3 | Partly | 64 | 3 | 3 | Partly | 62 | 3 | 3 | Partly | 66 | | | | | | | | | | | | |
| Malaysia * | 4 | 4 | Partly | 52 | 4 | 4 | Partly | 52 | 4 | 4 | Partly | 51 | | | | | | | | | | | | |
| Maldives * | 5 | 5 | Partly | 35 | 4 | 5 | Partly | 40 | 4 | 5 | Partly | 40 | | | | | | | | | | | | |
| Mali * | 4 | 4 | Partly | 44 | 5 | 5 | Partly | 41 | 6 | 5 | Not | 33 | | | | | | | | | | | | |
| Malta * | 2 | 1 | Free | 91 | 2 | 1 | Free | 90 | 2 | 1 | Free | 90 | | | | | | | | | | | | |
| Marshall Islands * | 1 | 1 | Free | 93 | 1 | 1 | Free | 93 | 1 | 1 | Free | 93 | | | | | | | | | | | | |
| Mauritania * | 6 | 5 | Not | 32 | 5 | 5 | Partly | 34 | 5 | 5 | Partly | 35 | | | | | | | | | | | | |
| Mauritius * | 1 | 2 | Free | 89 | 1 | 2 | Free | 89 | 1 | 2 | Free | 87 | | | | | | | | | | | | |
| Mexico * | 3 | 3 | Partly | 63 | 3 | 3 | Partly | 62 | 3 | 4 | Partly | 61 | | | | | | | | | | | | |
| Federated States of Micronesia * | 1 | 1 | Free | 92 | 1 | 1 | Free | 92 | 1 | 1 | Free | 92 | | | | | | | | | | | | |
| Moldova * | 3 | 4 | Partly | 58 | 3 | 4 | Partly | 60 | 3 | 3 | Partly | 61 | | | | | | | | | | | | |
| Monaco * | 3 | 1 | Free | 82 | 3 | 1 | Free | 83 | 3 | 1 | Free | 83 | | | | | | | | | | | | |
| Mongolia * | 1 | 2 | Free | 85 | 1 | 2 | Free | 84 | 1 | 2 | Free | 84 | | | | | | | | | | | | |
| Montenegro | 4 | 3 | Partly | 65 | 4 | 3 | Partly | 62 | 3 | 3 | Partly | 63 | | | | | | | | | | | | |
| Morocco * | 5 | 5 | Partly | 39 | 5 | 5 | Partly | 37 | 5 | 5 | Partly | 37 | | | | | | | | | | | | |
| Mozambique * | 4 | 4 | Partly | 51 | 5 | 4 | Partly | 45 | 5 | 4 | Partly | 43 | | | | | | | | | | | | |
| Myanmar * | 5 | 5 | Partly | 30 | 5 | 6 | Not | 30 | 5 | 6 | Not | 28 | | | | | | | | | | | | |
| Namibia * | 3 | 2 | Free | 75 | 2 | 2 | Free | 77 | 2 | 2 | Free | 77 | | | | | | | | | | | | |
| Nauru * | 2 | 2 | Free | 78 | 2 | 3 | Free | 77 | 2 | 3 | Free | 77 | | | | | | | | | | | | |
| Nepal * | 3 | 4 | Partly | 54 | 3 | 4 | Partly | 56 | 3 | 4 | Partly | 56 | | | | | | | | | | | | |
| Netherlands * | 1 | 1 | Free | 99 | 1 | 1 | Free | 99 | 1 | 1 | Free | 98 | | | | | | | | | | | | |
| New Zealand * | 1 | 1 | Free | 98 | 1 | 1 | Free | 97 | 1 | 1 | Free | 99 | | | | | | | | | | | | |
| Nicaragua * | 6 | 5 | Not | 32 | 6 | 5 | Not | 31 | 6 | 5 | Not | 30 | | | | | | | | | | | | |
| Niger * | 4 | 4 | Partly | 49 | 4 | 4 | Partly | 48 | 4 | 4 | Partly | 48 | | | | | | | | | | | | |
| Nigeria * | 3 | 5 | Partly | 50 | 4 | 5 | Partly | 47 | 4 | 5 | Partly | 45 | | | | | | | | | | | | |
| North Korea * | 7 | 7 | Not | 3 | 7 | 7 | Not | 3 | 7 | 7 | Not | 3 | | | | | | | | | | | | |
| North Macedonia * | 4 | 3 | Partly | 59 | 3 | 3 | Partly | 63 | 3 | 3 | Partly | 66 | | | | | | | | | | | | |
| Norway * | 1 | 1 | Free | 100 | 1 | 1 | Free | 100 | 1 | 1 | Free | 100 | | | | | | | | | | | | |
| Oman * | 6 | 5 | Not | 23 | 6 | 5 | Not | 23 | 6 | 5 | Not | 23 | | | | | | | | | | | | |
| Pakistan * | 5 | 5 | Partly | 39 | 5 | 5 | Partly | 38 | 5 | 5 | Partly | 37 | | | | | | | | | | | | |
| Palau * | 1 | 1 | Free | 92 | 1 | 1 | Free | 92 | 1 | 1 | Free | 92 | | | | | | | | | | | | |
| Panama * | 1 | 2 | Free | 84 | 1 | 2 | Free | 84 | 2 | 2 | Free | 83 | | | | | | | | | | | | |
| Papua New Guinea * | 4 | 3 | Partly | 64 | 4 | 3 | Partly | 62 | 4 | 3 | Partly | 62 | | | | | | | | | | | | |
| Paraguay * | 3 | 3 | Partly | 65 | 3 | 3 | Partly | 65 | 3 | 3 | Partly | 65 | | | | | | | | | | | | |
| Peru * | 2 | 3 | Free | 73 | 2 | 3 | Free | 72 | 3 | 3 | Partly | 71 | | | | | | | | | | | | |
| Philippines * | 3 | 3 | Partly | 61 | 3 | 4 | Partly | 59 | 3 | 4 | Partly | 56 | | | | | | | | | | | | |
| Poland * | 2 | 2 | Free | 84 | 2 | 2 | Free | 84 | 2 | 2 | Free | 82 | | | | | | | | | | | | |
| Portugal * | 1 | 1 | Free | 96 | 1 | 1 | Free | 96 | 1 | 1 | Free | 96 | | | | | | | | | | | | |
| Qatar * | 6 | 5 | Not | 25 | 6 | 5 | Not | 25 | 6 | 5 | Not | 25 | | | | | | | | | | | | |
| Romania * | 2 | 2 | Free | 81 | 2 | 2 | Free | 83 | 2 | 2 | Free | 83 | | | | | | | | | | | | |
| Russia * | 7 | 6 | Not | 20 | 7 | 6 | Not | 20 | 7 | 6 | Not | 20 | | | | | | | | | | | | |
| Rwanda * | 6 | 6 | Not | 23 | 6 | 6 | Not | 22 | 6 | 6 | Not | 21 | | | | | | | | | | | | |
| Saint Kitts and Nevis | 1 | 1 | Free | 89 | 1 | 1 | Free | 89 | 2 | 1 | Free | 89 | | | | | | | | | | | | |
| Saint Lucia | 1 | 1 | Free | 92 | 1 | 1 | Free | 92 | 1 | 1 | Free | 91 | | | | | | | | | | | | |
| Saint Vincent and the Grenadines * | 1 | 1 | Free | 91 | 1 | 1 | Free | 91 | 1 | 1 | Free | 91 | | | | | | | | | | | | |
| Samoa * | 2 | 2 | Free | 81 | 2 | 2 | Free | 81 | 2 | 2 | Free | 81 | | | | | | | | | | | | |
| San Marino | 1 | 1 | Free | 95 | 1 | 1 | Free | 95 | 1 | 1 | Free | 93 | | | | | | | | | | | | |
| São Tomé and Príncipe * | 2 | 2 | Free | 83 | 2 | 2 | Free | 84 | 2 | 2 | Free | 84 | | | | | | | | | | | | |
| Saudi Arabia * | 7 | 7 | Not | 7 | 7 | 7 | Not | 7 | 7 | 7 | Not | 7 | | | | | | | | | | | | |
| Senegal * | 2 | 3 | Free | 72 | 3 | 3 | Partly | 71 | 3 | 3 | Partly | 71 | | | | | | | | | | | | |
| Serbia * | 3 | 3 | Partly | 67 | 4 | 3 | Partly | 66 | 4 | 3 | Partly | 64 | | | | | | | | | | | | |
| Seychelles | 3 | 3 | Partly | 71 | 3 | 3 | Partly | 72 | 2 | 3 | Free | 77 | | | | | | | | | | | | |
| Sierra Leone * | 3 | 3 | Partly | 65 | 3 | 3 | Partly | 65 | 3 | 3 | Partly | 65 | | | | | | | | | | | | |
| Singapore * | 4 | 4 | Partly | 51 | 4 | 4 | Partly | 50 | 4 | 4 | Partly | 48 | | | | | | | | | | | | |
| Slovakia * | 1 | 2 | Free | 88 | 1 | 2 | Free | 88 | 1 | 1 | Free | 90 | | | | | | | | | | | | |
| Slovenia | 1 | 1 | Free | 94 | 1 | 1 | Free | 94 | 1 | 1 | Free | 95 | | | | | | | | | | | | |
| Solomon Islands * | 2 | 2 | Free | 79 | 2 | 2 | Free | 79 | 2 | 2 | Free | 79 | | | | | | | | | | | | |
| Somalia * | 7 | 7 | Not | 7 | 7 | 7 | Not | 7 | 7 | 7 | Not | 7 | | | | | | | | | | | | |
| South Africa * | 2 | 2 | Free | 79 | 2 | 2 | Free | 79 | 2 | 2 | Free | 79 | | | | | | | | | | | | |
| South Korea * | 2 | 2 | Free | 83 | 2 | 2 | Free | 83 | 2 | 2 | Free | 83 | | | | | | | | | | | | |
| South Sudan * | 7 | 7 | Not | 2 | 7 | 7 | Not | 2 | 7 | 7 | Not | 2 | | | | | | | | | | | | |
| Spain * | 1 | 1 | Free | 94 | 1 | 1 | Free | 92 | 1 | 1 | Free | 90 | | | | | | | | | | | | |
| Sri Lanka * | 3 | 4 | Partly | 56 | 4 | 4 | Partly | 56 | 4 | 4 | Partly | 56 | | | | | | | | | | | | |
| Sudan * | 7 | 7 | Not | 7 | 7 | 6 | Not | 12 | 7 | 6 | Not | 17 | | | | | | | | | | | | |
| Suriname * | 2 | 3 | Free | 77 | 2 | 3 | Free | 75 | 2 | 2 | Free | 79 | | | | | | | | | | | | |
| Sweden * | 1 | 1 | Free | 100 | 1 | 1 | Free | 100 | 1 | 1 | Free | 100 | | | | | | | | | | | | |
| Switzerland * | 1 | 1 | Free | 96 | 1 | 1 | Free | 96 | 1 | 1 | Free | 96 | | | | | | | | | | | | |
| Syria * | 7 | 7 | Not | 0 | 7 | 7 | Not | 0 | 7 | 7 | Not | 1 | 7 | 7 | Not | 1 | 7 | 7 | Not | 1 | | | | |
| Tajikistan * | 7 | 6 | Not | 9 | 7 | 6 | Not | 9 | 7 | 6 | Not | 8 | 7 | 6 | Not | 8 | 7 | 6 | Not | 7 | | | | |
| Tanzania * | 4 | 5 | Partly | 45 | 5 | 5 | Partly | 40 | 5 | 5 | Partly | 34 | 5 | 5 | Partly | 34 | 5 | 5 | Partly | 36 | | | | |
| Thailand * | 7 | 5 | Not | 30 | 6 | 4 | Partly | 32 | 7 | 5 | Not | 30 | 7 | 5 | Not | 29 | 6 | 5 | Not | 30 | | | | |
| Timor-Leste * | 2 | 3 | Free | 70 | 2 | 3 | Free | 71 | 2 | 3 | Free | 72 | | | | | | | | | | | | |
| Togo * | 5 | 4 | Partly | 43 | 5 | 4 | Partly | 44 | 5 | 4 | Partly | 43 | 5 | 4 | Partly | 42 | 5 | 4 | Partly | 42 | | | | |
| Tonga * | 2 | 2 | Free | 79 | 2 | 2 | Free | 79 | 2 | 2 | Free | 79 | 2 | 2 | Free | 79 | 2 | 2 | Free | 81 | | | | |
| Trinidad and Tobago * | 2 | 2 | Free | 82 | 2 | 2 | Free | 82 | 2 | 2 | Free | 82 | | | | | | | | | | | | |
| Tunisia * | 2 | 3 | Free | 69 | 2 | 3 | Free | 70 | 2 | 3 | Free | 71 | | | | | | | | | | | | |
| Turkey * | 5 | 6 | Not | 31 | 5 | 6 | Not | 32 | 5 | 6 | Not | 32 | | | | | | | | | | | | |
| Turkmenistan * | 7 | 7 | Not | 2 | 7 | 7 | Not | 2 | 7 | 7 | Not | 2 | | | | | | | | | | | | |
| Tuvalu * | 1 | 1 | Free | 93 | 1 | 1 | Free | 93 | 1 | 1 | Free | 93 | | | | | | | | | | | | |
| Uganda * | 6 | 5 | Not | 36 | 6 | 5 | Not | 34 | 6 | 5 | Not | 34 | | | | | | | | | | | | |
| Ukraine * | 3 | 4 | Partly | 60 | 3 | 3 | Partly | 62 | 3 | 4 | Partly | 60 | | | | | | | | | | | | |
| United Arab Emirates * | 7 | 6 | Not | 17 | 7 | 6 | Not | 17 | 7 | 6 | Not | 17 | | | | | | | | | | | | |
| United Kingdom * | 1 | 1 | Free | 93 | 1 | 1 | Free | 94 | 1 | 1 | Free | 93 | | | | | | | | | | | | |
| United States * | 2 | 1 | Free | 86 | 2 | 1 | Free | 86 | 2 | 2 | Free | 83 | 2 | 2 | Free | 83 | | | | | | | | |
| Uruguay * | 1 | 1 | Free | | 1 | 1 | Free | 98 | 1 | 1 | Free | 98 | | | | | | | | | | | | |
| Uzbekistan * | 7 | 6 | Not | | 7 | 6 | Not | 10 | 7 | 6 | Not | 11 | | | | | | | | | | | | |
| Vanuatu * | 2 | 2 | Free | 82 | 2 | 2 | Free | 82 | 2 | 2 | Free | 82 | | | | | | | | | | | | |
| Venezuela * | 7 | 6 | Not | 19 | 7 | 6 | Not | 16 | 7 | 6 | Not | 14 | | | | | | | | | | | | |
| Vietnam * | 7 | 5 | Not | 20 | 7 | 5 | Not | 20 | 7 | 6 | Not | 19 | | | | | | | | | | | | |
| Yemen * | 7 | 6 | Not | 11 | 7 | 6 | Not | 11 | 7 | 6 | Not | 11 | | | | | | | | | | | | |
| Zambia * | 4 | 4 | Partly | 54 | 4 | 4 | Partly | 54 | 4 | 4 | Partly | 52 | | | | | | | | | | | | |
| Zimbabwe * | 5 | 5 | Partly | 31 | 5 | 5 | Partly | 29 | 6 | 5 | Not | 28 | | | | | | | | | | | | |

| Country | 2013 | | | 2014 | | | 2015 | | | 2016 | | | 2017 | | | 2019 | | | | 2020 | | | |
| Country | PR | CL | Overall status | PR | CL | Overall status | PR | CL | Overall status | PR | CL | Overall status | PR | CL | Overall status | PR | CL | Overall status | Pts | PR | CL | Overall status | Pts |
|---|---|---|---|---|---|---|---|---|---|---|---|---|---|---|---|---|---|---|---|---|---|---|---|
| Abkhazia * | 4 | 5 | Partly | 4 | 5 | Partly | 4 | 5 | Partly | 4 | 5 | Partly | 4 | 5 | Partly | 17 | 23 | Partly | 40 | 17 | 23 | Partly | 40 |
| Crimea (disputed) | | | | 7 | 6 | Not | 7 | 6 | Not | 7 | 6 | Not | 7 | 6 | Not | -2 | 10 | Not | 8 | -2 | 9 | Not | 7 |
| Donetsk PR and Luhansk PR (disputed) | | | | | | | | | | | | | | | | -1 | 6 | Not | 5 | -1 | 5 | Not | 4 |
| Gaza Strip (Palestine) | 7 | 6 | Not | 7 | 6 | Not | 7 | 6 | Not | 7 | 6 | Not | 7 | 6 | Not | 3 | 8 | Not | 11 | 3 | 8 | Not | 11 |
| Hong Kong * (China) | 5 | 2 | Partly | 5 | 2 | Partly | 5 | 2 | Partly | 5 | 2 | Partly | 5 | 2 | Partly | 16 | 39 | Partly | 55 | 15 | 37 | Partly | 52 |
| Indian Kashmir (India) | 4 | 4 | Partly | 4 | 4 | Partly | 4 | 4 | Partly | 4 | 4 | Partly | 4 | 4 | Partly | 8 | 20 | Not | 28 | 7 | 20 | Not | 27 |
| Azad Kashmir (Pakistan) | 6 | 5 | Not | 6 | 5 | Not | 6 | 5 | Not | 6 | 5 | Not | 6 | 5 | Not | 9 | 19 | Not | 28 | 9 | 19 | Not | 28 |
| Northern Cyprus * | 2 | 2 | Free | 2 | 2 | Free | 2 | 2 | Free | 2 | 2 | Free | 2 | 2 | Free | 31 | 50 | Free | 81 | 28 | 50 | Free | 78 |
| Puerto Rico (United States)* | 1 | 2 | Free | 1 | 2 | Free | 1 | 1 | Free | | | | | | | | | | | | | | |
| Somaliland * | 4 | 5 | Partly | 4 | 5 | Partly | 5 | 5 | Partly | 5 | 5 | Partly | 4 | 5 | Partly | 17 | 24 | Partly | 41 | 18 | 24 | Partly | 42 |
| South Ossetia * | 7 | 6 | Not | 7 | 6 | Not | 7 | 6 | Not | 7 | 6 | Not | 7 | 6 | Not | 2 | 8 | Not | 10 | 2 | 8 | Not | 10 |
| Taiwan * | | | | | | | | | | | | | | | | 1 | 1 | Free | 93 | 1 | 1 | Free | 94 |
| Tibet (China) | 7 | 7 | Not | 7 | 7 | Not | 7 | 7 | Not | 7 | 7 | Not | 7 | 7 | Not | -2 | 3 | Not | 1 | -2 | 3 | Not | 1 |
| Transnistria * | 6 | 6 | Not | 6 | 6 | Not | 6 | 6 | Not | 6 | 6 | Not | 6 | 6 | Not | 9 | 13 | Not | 22 | 8 | 12 | Not | 20 |
| West Bank (Palestine) | 6 | 5 | Not | 6 | 5 | Not | 6 | 5 | Not | 7 | 5 | Not | 7 | 5 | Not | 4 | 21 | Not | 25 | 4 | 21 | Not | 25 |
| Western Sahara * | 7 | 7 | Not | 7 | 7 | Not | 7 | 7 | Not | 7 | 7 | Not | 7 | 7 | Not | -3 | 7 | Not | 4 | -3 | 7 | Not | 4 |

==== Former entries ====
Former entries from Freedom in the World. Most are territories added in the 1978 report for 1977 and received their last coverage in the 2000 report of the same year. Other territories with differing dates are noted below. Their placements are based on their final rankings before ceasing coverage.

===== Free =====
- Åland (1992–2000)
- American Samoa
- Anguilla
- Aruba (1988–2000)
- Azores
- Bermuda
- British Virgin Islands
- Canary Islands
- Cayman Islands
- Ceuta
- Christmas Island
- Cocos (Keeling) Islands
- Cook Islands
- Czechoslovakia (1972–1993)
- Easter Island
- Falkland Islands
- Faroe Islands
- French Guiana
- French Polynesia
- West Germany (1972–1990)
- Gibraltar
- Greenland
- Guadeloupe
- Guam
- Guernsey
- Isle of Man
- Jersey
- Madeira
- Martinique
- Mayotte
- Melilla
- Montserrat
- Netherlands Antilles
- New Caledonia
- Niue
- Norfolk Island
- Northern Ireland (1991–2004)
- Northern Mariana Islands
- Pitcairn Islands
- Puerto Rico (1977–2016)
- Réunion
- Saint Helena, Ascension and Tristan da Cunha
- Saint Martin
- Saint Pierre and Miquelon
- Serbia and Montenegro (1992–2006)
- Svalbard (1992–2000)
- Tokelau
- Turks and Caicos Islands
- United States Virgin Islands
- Wallis and Futuna

===== Partly Free =====
- Republic of Artsakh (1991–2023)
- Kurdistan Region (1992–2004)
- Macau (1977–2004)
- Panama Canal Zone (1977–1979)
- Vatican City (1984–1988)
- West Papua (1990–2003)
- South Vietnam (1972–1976)
- North Yemen (1972–1990)
- Yugoslavia (1972–1992)

===== Not Free =====
- Bophuthatswana (1977–1994)
- Chechnya (1998–2009)
- Ciskei (1981–1994)
- Crimea (2014–2024)
- Eastern Donbas (2020–2024)
- East Germany (1972–1990)
- Juan Fernández Islands (1977–1978)
- Occupied Territories (1977–2010)
- Palestinian Territories (1997–2010)
- Transkei (1988–1994)
- Venda (1979–1994)
- Soviet Union (1972–1990)
- North Vietnam (1972–1976)
- Vojvodina (1992–1995)
- South Yemen (1972–1990)

== Evaluation ==
There is some debate over the neutrality of Freedom House and the methodology used for the Freedom in the World report, which has been written by Raymond Gastil and his colleagues. The neutrality and biases of human-rights indices have been discussed in several publications by Kenneth A. Bollen. Bollen wrote that "Considered together these criticisms suggest that some nations may have been incorrectly rated on Gastil's measures. However, none of the criticisms have demonstrated a systematic bias in all the ratings. Most of the evidence consists of anecdotal evidence of relatively few cases. Whether there is a systematic or sporadic slant in Gastil's ratings is an open question" (Bollen, 1986, p. 586). The freedom index of Freedom in the World has a very strong and positive (at least an 80%) correlation with three other democracy-indices studied in Mainwaring (2001, p. 53).

=== Ideological bias or neutrality ===
In his 1986 study, Bollen discussed reviews of measurements of human rights, including the index reported in Freedom in the World (Bollen, 1986, p. 585). Criticisms of Freedom in the World during the 1980s were discussed by Gastil (1990), who stated that "generally such criticism is based on opinions about Freedom House rather than detailed examination of survey ratings", a conclusion disputed by Giannone. The definition of Freedom in Gastil (1982) and Freedom House (1990) emphasized liberties rather than the exercise of freedom, according to Adam Przeworski, who gave the following example: In the United States, citizens are free to form political parties and to vote, yet even in presidential elections only half of U.S. "citizens" vote; in the U.S., "the same two parties speak in a commercially sponsored unison", wrote Przeworski (2003, p. 277).

More recent charges of ideological bias prompted Freedom House to issue this 2010 statement:

Freedom House does not maintain a culture-bound view of freedom. The methodology of the survey is grounded in basic standards of political rights and civil liberties, derived in large measure from relevant portions of the Universal Declaration of Human Rights. These standards apply to all countries and territories, irrespective of geographical location, ethnic or religious composition, or level of economic development.

Mainwaring et alia (2001, p. 52) wrote that Freedom House's index had "two systematic biases: scores for leftist were tainted by political considerations, and changes in scores are sometimes driven by changes in their criteria rather than changes in real conditions." Nonetheless, when evaluated in Latin American countries yearly, Freedom House's index was very strongly and positively correlated with the index of Adam Przeworski and with the index of the authors themselves: They evaluated Pearson's coefficient of linear correlation between their index and Freedom House's index, which was 0.82; among these indices and the two others studied, the correlations were all between 0.80 and 0.86 (Mainwaring et alia, 2001, p. 53).

As previously quoted, Bollen criticized previous studies of Freedom in the World as anecdotal and inconclusive; they raised issues needing further study by scientific methods rather than anecdotes. Bollen studied the question of ideological bias using multivariate statistics. Using their factor-analytic model for human-rights measurements, Bollen and Paxton estimate that Gastil's method produces a bias of -0.38 standard deviations (s.d.) against Marxist–Leninist countries and a larger bias, +0.5 s.d., favoring Christian countries; similar results held for the methodology of Sussman (Bollen and Paxton, 2000, p. 585). In contrast, another method by a critic of Freedom in the World produced a bias for Leftist countries during the 1980s of at least +0.8 s.d., a bias that is "consistent with the general finding that political scientists are more favorable to leftist politics than is the general population" (Bollen and Paxton, p. 585).

=== Coder bias ===
Political scientists Andrew T. Little and Anne Meng argued that the data produced by Freedom House and the Varieties of Democracy (V-Dem) project relies heavily on subjective, as opposed to objective, measures and thus are tainted by coder bias.

=== Use and conceptual analysis ===
Criticisms of the reception and uses of the Freedom in the World report have been noted by Diego Giannone:

- "Conceptual stretching", Giovanni Sartori's critical term for a methodological shortcoming common in social studies. Giannone reports as an example that, according to Landman and Hausermann (2003), "the index by FH has been used as a tool for measuring democracy, good governance, and human rights, thus producing a conceptual stretching which is a major cause of 'losses in connotative precision': in short, an instrument used to measure everything, in the end, is not able to discriminate against anything."
- Issues with aggregation. Giannone quotes Scoble and Wiseberg's conclusion (1981) that "the sum of a civil liberty score of 4 and a political liberty score of 2 is the same as the sum of a civil liberty score of 2 and a political liberty score of 4 even though the substantive interpretation of these different combinations is different."
- "Lack of specificity and rigorousness in construction" and "inadequate level of transparency and replicability of the scales", the first referencing to Scoble et alie (1981) and the latter to Hadenius and Teorell (2005). In support of the latter, he also quotes the conclusion of Munck and Verkuilen (2002) that "the aggregate data offered by Freedom House has to be accepted largely on faith", due to the factors that "no set of coding rules is provided, and the sources of information are not identified with enough precision, and because disaggregated data have not been made available to independent scholars".

=== Time series ===
In "Political and ideological aspects in the measurement of democracy: the Freedom House case" (2010) which reviewed changes to the methodology since 1990, Diego Giannone concluded that "because of the changes in methodology over time and the strict interconnection between methodological and political aspects, the FH data do not offer an unbroken and politically neutral time series, such that they should not be used for cross-time analyses even for the development of first hypotheses. The internal consistency of the data series is open to question."

On this topic, the Freedom House website replies that they have "made a number of modest methodological changes to adapt to evolving ideas about political rights and civil liberties. At the same time, the time series data are not revised retroactively, and any changes to the methodology are introduced incrementally in order to ensure the comparability of the ratings from year to year."

== See also ==
- Democracy in the Middle East
- Democracy Index
- Freedom in the World by region
- Index of Freedom in the World
- List of indices of freedom
- Polity data series
