= Freedom in the World by region =

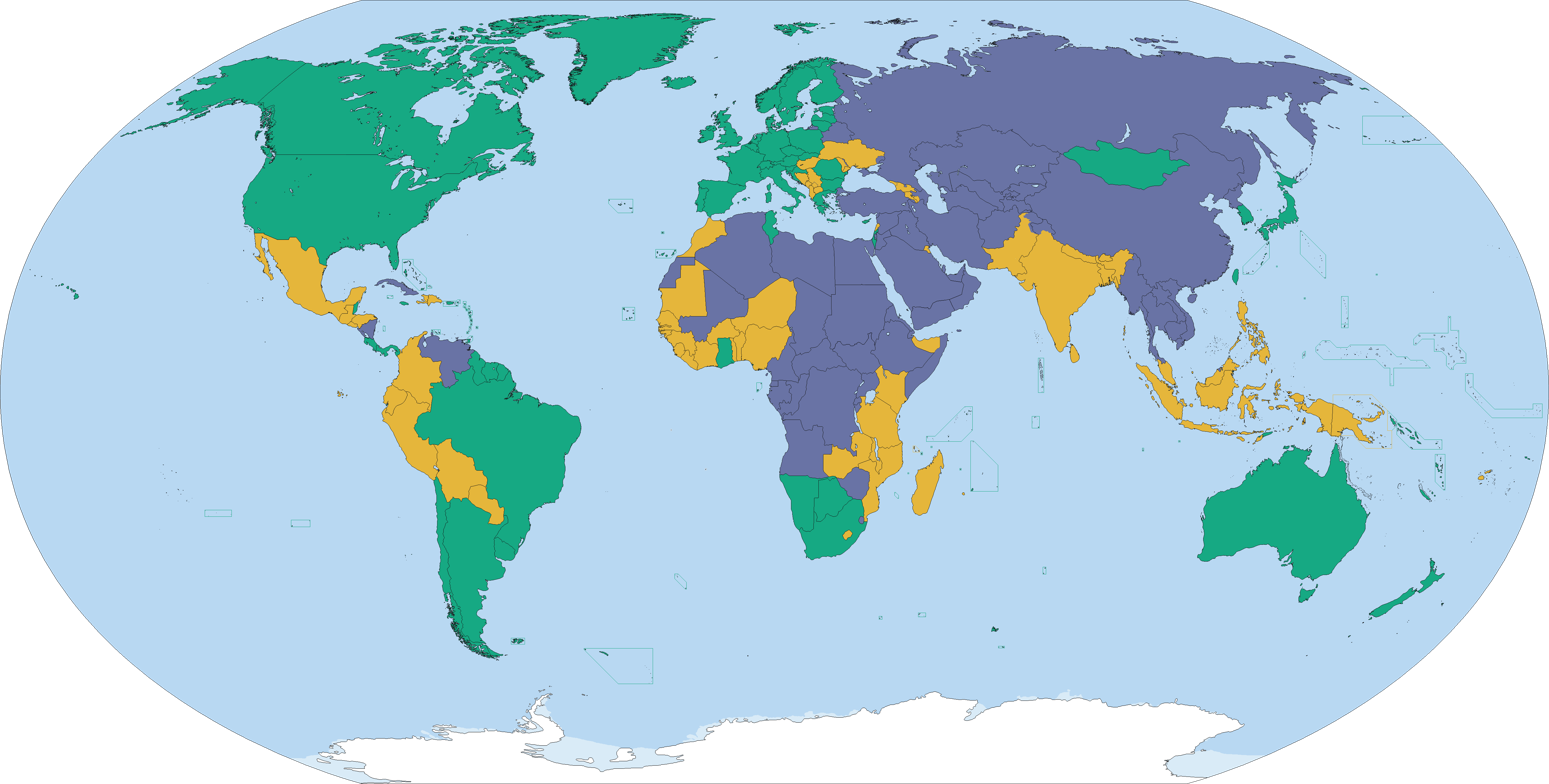
Classification of countries according to the Freedom House's Freedom in the World 2021 survey, concerning the state of world freedom in 2020. Free Partly Free Not Free

Countries designated "electoral democracies" in Freedom House's Freedom in the World 2025 survey, covering the year 2024

Freedom in the World is a yearly survey and report by the U.S.-based non-governmental organization Freedom House that measures the degree of civil liberties and political rights in every nation and significant related and disputed territories around the world.

== Sub-Saharan Africa ==
Key: * - Electoral democracies (as described above), PR - Political Rights, CL - Civil Liberties, Free Status: Free, Partly Free, Not Free

	2010			2011			2012			2013			2014			2015			2016			2017			2018		
Country	PR	CL	Free	PR	CL	Free	PR	CL	Free	PR	CL	Free	PR	CL	Free	PR	CL	Free	PR	CL	Free	PR	CL	Free	PR	CL	Free
Angola	6	5	Not	6	5	Not	6	5	Not	6	5	Not	6	5	Not	6	5	Not	6	6	Not	6	6	Not	6	6	Not
Benin*	2	2	Free	2	2	Free	2	2	Free	2	2	Free	2	2	Free	2	2	Free	2	2	Free	2	2	Free	2	2	Free
Botswana*	3	2	Free	3	2	Free	3	2	Free	3	2	Free	3	2	Free	3	2	Free	3	2	Free	3	2	Free	3	2	Free
Burkina Faso*	5	3	Partly	5	3	Partly	5	3	Partly	5	3	Partly	5	3	Partly	6	3	Partly	4	3	Partly	4	3	Partly	4	3	Partly
Burundi	4	5	Partly	5	5	Partly	5	5	Partly	5	5	Partly	5	5	Partly	6	5	Not	7	6	Not	7	6	Not	7	6	Not
Cameroon	6	6	Not	6	6	Not	6	6	Not	6	6	Not	6	6	Not	6	6	Not	6	6	Not	6	6	Not	6	6	Not
Cape Verde*	1	1	Free	1	1	Free	1	1	Free	1	1	Free	1	1	Free	1	1	Free	1	1	Free	1	1	Free	1	1	Free
Central African Republic	5	5	Partly	5	5	Partly	5	5	Partly	5	5	Partly	7	7	Not	7	7	Not	7	7	Not	7	7	Not	7	7	Not
Chad	7	6	Not	7	6	Not	7	6	Not	7	6	Not	7	6	Not	7	6	Not	7	6	Not	7	6	Not	7	6	Not
Comoros*	3	4	Partly	3	4	Partly	3	4	Partly	3	4	Partly	3	4	Partly	3	4	Partly	3	4	Partly	3	4	Partly	3	4	Partly
(Republic of the Congo) Congo, Republic of	6	5	Not	6	5	Not	6	5	Not	6	5	Not	6	5	Not	6	5	Not	6	5	Not	7	5	Not	7	5	Not
(Democratic Republic of the Congo) Congo, Democratic Republic of	6	6	Not	6	6	Not	6	6	Not	6	6	Not	6	6	Not	6	6	Not	6	6	Not	7	6	Not	7	6	Not
Ivory Coast*	6	5	Not	7	6	Not	6	6	Not	5	5	Partly	5	4	Partly	5	4	Partly	4	4	Partly	4	4	Partly	4	4	Partly
Djibouti	5	5	Partly	6	5	Not	6	5	Not	6	5	Not	6	5	Not	6	5	Not	6	5	Not	6	5	Not	6	5	Not
Equatorial Guinea	7	7	Not	7	7	Not	7	7	Not	7	7	Not	7	7	Not	7	7	Not	7	7	Not	7	7	Not	7	7	Not
Eritrea	7	7	Not	7	7	Not	7	7	Not	7	7	Not	7	7	Not	7	7	Not	7	7	Not	7	7	Not	7	7	Not
Ethiopia	5	5	Partly	6	6	Not	6	6	Not	6	6	Not	6	6	Not	6	6	Not	7	6	Not	7	6	Not	7	6	Not
Gabon	6	5	Not	6	5	Not	6	5	Not	6	5	Not	6	5	Not	6	5	Not	6	5	Not	6	5	Not	7	5	Not
Gambia	5	5	Partly	5	5	Partly	6	5	Not	6	6	Not	6	6	Not	6	6	Not	7	6	Not	6	6	Not	4	5	Partly
Ghana*	1	2	Free	1	2	Free	1	2	Free	1	2	Free	1	2	Free	1	2	Free	1	2	Free	1	2	Free	1	2	Free
Guinea	7	6	Not	5	5	Partly	5	5	Partly	5	5	Partly	5	5	Partly	5	5	Partly	5	5	Partly	5	5	Partly	5	5	Partly
Guinea-Bissau	4	4	Partly	4	4	Partly	4	4	Partly	6	5	Not	6	5	Not	5	5	Partly	5	5	Partly	5	5	Partly	5	5	Partly
Kenya*	4	4	Partly	4	3	Partly	4	3	Partly	4	4	Partly	4	4	Partly	4	4	Partly	4	4	Partly	4	4	Partly	4	4	Partly
Lesotho*	3	3	Partly	3	3	Partly	3	3	Partly	2	3	Free	2	3	Free	2	3	Free	3	3	Partly	3	3	Partly	3	3	Partly
Liberia*	3	4	Partly	3	4	Partly	3	4	Partly	3	4	Partly	3	4	Partly	3	4	Partly	3	4	Partly	3	4	Partly	3	3	Partly
Madagascar*	6	4	Partly	6	4	Partly	6	4	Partly	6	4	Partly	5	4	Partly	4	4	Partly	3	4	Partly	3	4	Partly	3	4	Partly
Malawi*	3	4	Partly	3	4	Partly	3	4	Partly	3	4	Partly	3	4	Partly	3	4	Partly	3	3	Partly	3	3	Partly	3	3	Partly
Mali	2	3	Free	2	3	Free	2	3	Free	7	5	Not	5	4	Partly	5	4	Partly	5	4	Partly	5	4	Partly	5	4	Partly
Mauritania	6	5	Not	6	5	Not	6	5	Not	6	5	Not	6	5	Not	6	5	Not	6	5	Not	6	5	Not	6	5	Not
Mauritius*	1	2	Free	1	2	Free	1	2	Free	1	2	Free	1	2	Free	1	2	Free	1	2	Free	1	2	Free	1	2	Free
Mozambique	4	3	Partly	4	3	Partly	4	3	Partly	4	3	Partly	4	3	Partly	4	3	Partly	4	4	Partly	4	4	Partly	4	4	Partly
Namibia*	2	2	Free	2	2	Free	2	2	Free	2	2	Free	2	2	Free	2	2	Free	2	2	Free	2	2	Free	2	2	Free
Niger	5	4	Partly	5	4	Partly	3	4	Partly	3	4	Partly	3	4	Partly	3	4	Partly	3	4	Partly	4	4	Partly	4	4	Partly
Nigeria*	5	4	Partly	4	4	Partly	4	4	Partly	4	4	Partly	4	4	Partly	4	5	Partly	4	5	Partly	3	5	Partly	3	5	Partly
Rwanda	6	5	Not	6	5	Not	6	5	Not	6	6	Not	6	5	Not	6	6	Not	6	6	Not	6	6	Not	6	6	Not
São Tomé and Príncipe*	2	2	Free	2	2	Free	2	2	Free	2	2	Free	2	2	Free	2	2	Free	2	2	Free	2	2	Free	2	2	Free
Senegal*	3	3	Partly	3	3	Partly	3	3	Partly	2	3	Free	2	2	Free	2	2	Free	2	2	Free	2	2	Free	2	2	Free
Seychelles*	3	3	Partly	3	3	Partly	3	3	Partly	3	3	Partly	3	3	Partly	3	3	Partly	3	3	Partly	3	3	Partly	3	3	Partly
Sierra Leone*	3	3	Partly	3	3	Partly	3	3	Partly	2	3	Free	3	3	Partly	3	3	Partly	3	3	Partly	3	3	Partly	3	3	Partly
Somalia	7	7	Not	7	7	Not	7	7	Not	7	7	Not	7	7	Not	7	7	Not	7	7	Not	7	7	Not	7	7	Not
South Africa*	2	2	Free	2	2	Free	2	2	Free	2	2	Free	2	2	Free	2	2	Free	2	2	Free	2	2	Free	2	2	Free
South Sudan	7	7	Not	7	7	Not	6	5	Not	6	5	Not	6	6	Not	7	6	Not	7	6	Not	7	7	Not	7	7	Not
Sudan	7	7	Not	7	7	Not	7	7	Not	7	7	Not	7	7	Not	7	7	Not	7	7	Not	7	7	Not	7	7	Not
Eswatini	7	5	Not	7	5	Not	7	5	Not	7	5	Not	7	5	Not	7	5	Not	7	5	Not	7	5	Not	7	6	Not
Tanzania*	4	3	Partly	3	3	Partly	3	3	Partly	3	3	Partly	3	3	Partly	3	3	Partly	3	4	Partly	3	4	Partly	4	4	Partly
Togo	5	4	Partly	5	4	Partly	5	4	Partly	5	4	Partly	4	4	Partly	4	4	Partly	4	4	Partly	4	4	Partly	4	4	Partly
Uganda	5	4	Partly	5	4	Partly	5	4	Partly	5	4	Partly	6	4	Partly	6	5	Not	6	5	Not	6	5	Not	6	4	Partly
Zambia	3	4	Partly	3	4	Partly	3	4	Partly	3	4	Partly	3	4	Partly	3	4	Partly	3	4	Partly	4	4	Partly	4	4	Partly
Zimbabwe	6	6	Not	6	6	Not	6	6	Not	6	6	Not	5	6	Not	5	6	Not	5	5	Partly	5	5	Partly	6	5	Not

== Americas ==
Key: * - Electoral democracies (as described above), PR - Political Rights, CL - Civil Liberties, Free Status: Free, Partly Free, Not Free

	2010			2011			2012			2013			2014			2015			2016			2017			2018		
Country	PR	CL	Free	PR	CL	Free	PR	CL	Free	PR	CL	Free	PR	CL	Free	PR	CL	Free	PR	CL	Free	PR	CL	Free	PR	CL	Free
Antigua and Barbuda*	3	2	Free	3	2	Free	3	2	Free	2	2	Free	2	2	Free	2	2	Free	2	2	Free	2	2	Free	2	2	Free
Argentina*	2	2	Free	2	2	Free	2	2	Free	2	2	Free	2	2	Free	2	2	Free	2	2	Free	2	2	Free	2	2	Free
Bahamas*	1	1	Free	1	1	Free	1	1	Free	1	1	Free	1	1	Free	1	1	Free	1	1	Free	1	1	Free	1	1	Free
Barbados*	1	1	Free	1	1	Free	1	1	Free	1	1	Free	1	1	Free	1	1	Free	1	1	Free	1	1	Free	1	1	Free
Belize*	1	2	Free	1	2	Free	1	2	Free	1	2	Free	1	2	Free	1	2	Free	1	2	Free	1	2	Free	1	2	Free
Bolivia*	3	3	Partly	3	3	Partly	3	3	Partly	3	3	Partly	3	3	Partly	3	3	Partly	3	3	Partly	3	3	Partly	3	3	Partly
Brazil*	2	2	Free	2	2	Free	2	2	Free	2	2	Free	2	2	Free	2	2	Free	2	2	Free	2	2	Free	2	2	Free
Canada*	1	1	Free	1	1	Free	1	1	Free	1	1	Free	1	1	Free	1	1	Free	1	1	Free	1	1	Free	1	1	Free
Chile*	1	1	Free	1	1	Free	1	1	Free	1	1	Free	1	1	Free	1	1	Free	1	1	Free	1	1	Free	1	1	Free
Colombia*	3	4	Partly	3	4	Partly	3	4	Partly	3	4	Partly	3	4	Partly	3	4	Partly	3	4	Partly	3	3	Partly	3	3	Partly
Costa Rica*	1	1	Free	1	1	Free	1	1	Free	1	1	Free	1	1	Free	1	1	Free	1	1	Free	1	1	Free	1	1	Free
Cuba	7	6	Not	7	6	Not	7	6	Not	7	6	Not	7	6	Not	7	6	Not	7	6	Not	7	6	Not	7	6	Not
Dominica*	1	1	Free	1	1	Free	1	1	Free	1	1	Free	1	1	Free	1	1	Free	1	1	Free	1	1	Free	1	1	Free
Dominican Republic*	2	2	Free	2	2	Free	2	2	Free	2	2	Free	2	3	Free	2	3	Free	3	3	Partly	3	3	Partly	3	3	Partly
Ecuador*	3	3	Partly	3	3	Partly	3	3	Partly	3	3	Partly	3	3	Partly	3	3	Partly	3	3	Partly	3	4	Partly	3	3	Partly
El Salvador*	2	3	Free	2	3	Free	2	3	Free	2	3	Free	2	3	Free	2	3	Free	2	3	Free	2	3	Free	2	3	Free
Grenada*	1	2	Free	1	2	Free	1	2	Free	1	2	Free	1	2	Free	1	2	Free	1	2	Free	1	2	Free	1	2	Free
Guatemala*	4	4	Partly	4	4	Partly	3	4	Partly	3	4	Partly	3	4	Partly	3	4	Partly	4	4	Partly	4	4	Partly	4	4	Partly
Guyana*	2	3	Free	2	3	Free	2	3	Free	2	3	Free	2	3	Free	2	3	Free	2	3	Free	2	3	Free	2	3	Free
Haiti	4	5	Partly	4	5	Partly	4	5	Partly	4	5	Partly	4	5	Partly	5	5	Partly	5	5	Partly	5	5	Partly	5	5	Partly
Honduras	4	4	Partly	4	4	Partly	4	4	Partly	4	4	Partly	4	4	Partly	4	4	Partly	4	4	Partly	4	4	Partly	4	4	Partly
Jamaica*	2	3	Free	2	3	Free	2	3	Free	2	3	Free	2	3	Free	2	3	Free	2	3	Free	2	3	Free	2	3	Free
Mexico*	2	3	Free	3	3	Partly	3	3	Partly	3	3	Partly	3	3	Partly	3	3	Partly	3	3	Partly	3	3	Partly	3	3	Partly
Nicaragua	4	4	Partly	4	4	Partly	5	4	Partly	5	4	Partly	4	3	Partly	4	3	Partly	4	3	Partly	5	4	Partly	5	4	Partly
Panama*	1	2	Free	1	2	Free	1	2	Free	1	2	Free	2	2	Free	2	2	Free	2	2	Free	2	2	Free	2	2	Free
Paraguay*	3	3	Partly	3	3	Partly	3	3	Partly	3	3	Partly	3	3	Partly	3	3	Partly	3	3	Partly	3	3	Partly	3	3	Partly
Peru*	2	3	Free	2	3	Free	2	3	Free	2	3	Free	2	3	Free	2	3	Free	2	3	Free	2	3	Free	2	3	Free
Saint Kitts and Nevis*	1	1	Free	1	1	Free	1	1	Free	1	1	Free	1	1	Free	1	1	Free	2	1	Free	1	1	Free	1	1	Free
Saint Lucia*	1	1	Free	1	1	Free	1	1	Free	1	1	Free	1	1	Free	1	1	Free	1	1	Free	1	1	Free	1	1	Free
Saint Vincent and the Grenadines*	2	1	Free	1	1	Free	1	1	Free	1	1	Free	1	1	Free	1	1	Free	1	1	Free	1	1	Free	1	1	Free
Suriname*	2	2	Free	2	2	Free	2	2	Free	2	2	Free	2	2	Free	2	2	Free	2	3	Free	2	3	Free	2	2	Free
Trinidad and Tobago*	2	2	Free	2	2	Free	2	2	Free	2	2	Free	2	2	Free	2	2	Free	2	2	Free	2	2	Free	2	2	Free
United States*	1	1	Free	1	1	Free	1	1	Free	1	1	Free	1	1	Free	1	1	Free	1	1	Free	1	1	Free	2	1	Free
Uruguay*	1	1	Free	1	1	Free	1	1	Free	1	1	Free	1	1	Free	1	1	Free	1	1	Free	1	1	Free	1	1	Free
Venezuela	5	4	Partly	5	5	Partly	5	5	Partly	5	5	Partly	5	5	Partly	5	5	Partly	5	5	Partly	6	5	Not	6	5	Not

== Asia-Pacific ==
Key: * - Electoral democracies (as described above), PR - Political Rights, CL - Civil Liberties, Free Status: Free, Partly Free, Not Free

	2010			2011			2012			2013			2014			2015			2016			2017			2018				2019			
Country	PR	CL	Free	PR	CL	Free	PR	CL	Free	PR	CL	Free	PR	CL	Free	PR	CL	Free	PR	CL	Free	PR	CL	Free	PR	CL	Free	Pts	PR	CL	Free	Pts
Afghanistan	6	6	Not	6	6	Not	6	6	Not	6	6	Not	6	6	Not	6	6	Not	6	6	Not	6	6	Not	5	6	Not					
Australia*	1	1	Free	1	1	Free	1	1	Free	1	1	Free	1	1	Free	1	1	Free	1	1	Free	1	1	Free	1	1	Free					
Bangladesh*	3	4	Partly	3	4	Partly	3	4	Partly	3	4	Partly	3	4	Partly	4	4	Partly	4	4	Partly	4	4	Partly	4	4	Partly					
Bhutan*	4	5	Partly	4	5	Partly	4	5	Partly	4	5	Partly	3	4	Partly	3	4	Partly	3	4	Partly	3	4	Partly	3	4	Partly					
Brunei	6	5	Not	6	5	Not	6	5	Not	6	5	Not	6	5	Not	6	5	Not	6	5	Not	6	5	Not	6	5	Not					
Cambodia	6	5	Not	6	5	Not	6	5	Not	6	5	Not	6	5	Not	6	5	Not	6	5	Not	6	5	Not	6	5	Not					
China	7	6	Not	7	6	Not	7	6	Not	7	6	Not	7	6	Not	7	6	Not	7	6	Not	7	6	Not	7	6	Not					
Fiji*	6	4	Partly	6	4	Partly	6	4	Partly	6	4	Partly	6	4	Partly	3	4	Partly	3	3	Partly	3	4	Partly	3	3	Partly					
India*	2	3	Free	2	3	Free	2	3	Free	2	3	Free	2	3	Free	2	3	Free	2	3	Free	2	3	Free	2	3	Free					
Indonesia*	2	3	Free	2	3	Free	2	3	Free	2	3	Free	2	4	Partly	2	4	Partly	2	4	Partly	2	4	Partly	2	4	Partly					
Japan*	1	2	Free	1	2	Free	1	2	Free	1	2	Free	1	1	Free	1	1	Free	1	1	Free	1	1	Free	1	1	Free					
Kiribati*	1	1	Free	1	1	Free	1	1	Free	1	1	Free	1	1	Free	1	1	Free	1	1	Free	1	1	Free	1	1	Free					
North Korea	7	7	Not	7	7	Not	7	7	Not	7	7	Not	7	7	Not	7	7	Not	7	7	Not	7	7	Not	7	7	Not					
South Korea*	1	2	Free	1	2	Free	1	2	Free	1	2	Free	2	2	Free	2	2	Free	2	2	Free	2	2	Free	2	2	Free					
Laos	7	6	Not	7	6	Not	7	6	Not	7	6	Not	7	6	Not	7	6	Not	7	6	Not	7	6	Not	7	6	Not					
Malaysia	4	4	Partly	4	4	Partly	4	4	Partly	4	4	Partly	4	4	Partly	4	4	Partly	4	4	Partly	4	4	Partly	4	4	Partly					
Maldives	3	4	Partly	3	4	Partly	3	4	Partly	5	4	Partly	4	4	Partly	4	4	Partly	4	5	Partly	5	5	Partly	5	5	Partly					
Marshall Islands*	1	1	Free	1	1	Free	1	1	Free	1	1	Free	1	1	Free	1	1	Free	1	1	Free	1	1	Free	1	1	Free					
(Federated States of Micronesia) Micronesia*	1	1	Free	1	1	Free	1	1	Free	1	1	Free	1	1	Free	1	1	Free	1	1	Free	1	1	Free	1	1	Free					
Mongolia*	2	2	Free	2	2	Free	2	2	Free	1	2	Free	1	2	Free	1	2	Free	1	2	Free	1	2	Free	1	2	Free					
Myanmar	7	7	Not	7	7	Not	7	6	Not	6	5	Not	6	5	Not	6	6	Not	6	5	Not	5	5	Partly	5	5	Partly					
Nauru*	1	1	Free	1	1	Free	1	1	Free	1	1	Free	1	1	Free	1	2	Free	2	2	Free	2	2	Free	2	2	Free					
Nepal*	4	4	Partly	4	4	Partly	4	4	Partly	4	4	Partly	4	4	Partly	3	4	Partly	3	4	Partly	3	4	Partly	3	4	Partly					
New Zealand*	1	1	Free	1	1	Free	1	1	Free	1	1	Free	1	1	Free	1	1	Free	1	1	Free	1	1	Free	1	1	Free					
Pakistan*	4	5	Partly	4	5	Partly	4	5	Partly	4	5	Partly	4	5	Partly	4	5	Partly	4	5	Partly	4	5	Partly	4	5	Partly					
Palau*	1	1	Free	1	1	Free	1	1	Free	1	1	Free	1	1	Free	1	1	Free	1	1	Free	1	1	Free	1	1	Free					
Papua New Guinea*	4	3	Partly	4	3	Partly	4	3	Partly	4	3	Partly	3	3	Partly	4	3	Partly	4	3	Partly	3	3	Partly	3	3	Partly					
Philippines*	4	3	Partly	3	3	Partly	3	3	Partly	3	3	Partly	3	3	Partly	3	3	Partly	3	3	Partly	3	3	Partly	3	3	Partly					
Samoa*	2	2	Free	2	2	Free	2	2	Free	2	2	Free	2	2	Free	2	2	Free	2	2	Free	2	2	Free	2	2	Free					
Singapore	5	4	Partly	5	4	Partly	4	4	Partly	4	4	Partly	4	4	Partly	4	4	Partly	4	4	Partly	4	4	Partly	4	4	Partly					
Solomon Islands*	4	3	Partly	4	3	Partly	4	3	Partly	4	3	Partly	4	3	Partly	3	3	Partly	3	3	Partly	3	2	Free	3	2	Free					
Sri Lanka*	4	4	Partly	5	4	Partly	5	4	Partly	5	4	Partly	5	4	Partly	5	5	Partly	4	4	Partly	3	4	Partly	3	4	Partly					
Taiwan*	1	2	Free	1	2	Free	1	2	Free	1	2	Free	1	2	Free	1	2	Free	1	2	Free	1	1	Free	1	1	Free					
Thailand	5	4	Partly	5	4	Partly	4	4	Partly	4	4	Partly	4	4	Partly	6	5	Not	6	5	Not	6	5	Not	6	5	Not					
Timor-Leste*	3	4	Partly	3	4	Partly	3	4	Partly	3	4	Partly	3	4	Partly	3	3	Partly	3	3	Partly	3	3	Partly	2	3	Free					
Tonga*	5	3	Partly	3	3	Partly	3	3	Partly	3	2	Free	2	2	Free	2	2	Free	2	2	Free	2	2	Free	2	2	Free					
Tuvalu*	1	1	Free	1	1	Free	1	1	Free	1	1	Free	1	1	Free	1	1	Free	1	1	Free	1	1	Free	1	1	Free					
Vanuatu*	2	2	Free	2	2	Free	2	2	Free	2	2	Free	2	2	Free	2	2	Free	2	2	Free	2	2	Free	2	2	Free					
Vietnam	7	5	Not	7	5	Not	7	5	Not	7	5	Not	7	5	Not	7	5	Not	7	5	Not	7	5	Not	7	5	Not					

== Eurasia ==
Key: * - Electoral democracies (as described above), PR - Political Rights, CL - Civil Liberties, Free Status: Free, Partly Free, Not Free

	2010			2011			2012			2013			2014			2015			2016			2017			2018		
Country	PR	CL	Free	PR	CL	Free	PR	CL	Free	PR	CL	Free	PR	CL	Free	PR	CL	Free	PR	CL	Free	PR	CL	Free	PR	CL	Free
Armenia	6	4	Partly	6	4	Partly	6	4	Partly	5	4	Partly	5	4	Partly	5	4	Partly	5	4	Partly	5	4	Partly	5	4	Partly
Azerbaijan	6	5	Not	6	5	Not	6	5	Not	6	5	Not	6	6	Not	6	6	Not	7	6	Not	7	6	Not	7	6	Not
Belarus	7	6	Not	7	6	Not	7	6	Not	7	6	Not	7	6	Not	7	6	Not	7	6	Not	7	6	Not	6	6	Not
Georgia*	4	4	Partly	4	3	Partly	4	3	Partly	3	3	Partly	3	3	Partly	3	3	Partly	3	3	Partly	3	3	Partly	3	3	Partly
Kazakhstan	6	5	Not	6	5	Not	6	5	Not	6	5	Not	6	5	Not	6	5	Not	6	5	Not	7	5	Not	7	5	Not
Kyrgyzstan	6	5	Not	5	5	Partly	5	5	Partly	5	5	Partly	5	5	Partly	5	5	Partly	5	5	Partly	5	5	Partly	5	5	Partly
Moldova*	3	4	Partly	3	3	Partly	3	3	Partly	3	3	Partly	3	3	Partly	3	3	Partly	3	3	Partly	3	3	Partly	3	3	Partly
Russia	6	5	Not	6	5	Not	6	5	Not	6	5	Not	6	5	Not	6	6	Not	6	6	Not	7	6	Not	7	6	Not
Tajikistan	6	5	Not	6	5	Not	6	5	Not	6	6	Not	6	6	Not	6	6	Not	7	6	Not	7	6	Not	7	6	Not
Turkmenistan	7	7	Not	7	7	Not	7	7	Not	7	7	Not	7	7	Not	7	7	Not	7	7	Not	7	7	Not	7	7	Not
Ukraine*	3	2	Free	3	3	Partly	4	3	Partly	4	3	Partly	4	3	Partly	3	3	Partly	3	3	Partly	3	3	Partly	3	3	Partly
Uzbekistan	7	7	Not	7	7	Not	7	7	Not	7	7	Not	7	7	Not	7	7	Not	7	7	Not	7	7	Not	7	7	Not

== Europe ==
Key: * - Electoral democracies (as described above), PR - Political Rights, CL - Civil Liberties, Free Status: Free, Partly Free, Not Free

	2010			2011			2012			2013			2014			2015			2016			2017			2018		
Country	PR	CL	Free	PR	CL	Free	PR	CL	Free	PR	CL	Free	PR	CL	Free	PR	CL	Free	PR	CL	Free	PR	CL	Free	PR	CL	Free
Albania*	3	3	Partly	3	3	Partly	3	3	Partly	3	3	Partly	3	3	Partly	3	3	Partly	3	3	Partly	3	3	Partly	3	3	Partly
Andorra*	1	1	Free	1	1	Free	1	1	Free	1	1	Free	1	1	Free	1	1	Free	1	1	Free	1	1	Free	1	1	Free
Austria*	1	1	Free	1	1	Free	1	1	Free	1	1	Free	1	1	Free	1	1	Free	1	1	Free	1	1	Free	1	1	Free
Belgium*	1	1	Free	1	1	Free	1	1	Free	1	1	Free	1	1	Free	1	1	Free	1	1	Free	1	1	Free	1	1	Free
Bosnia and Herzegovina*	4	3	Partly	4	3	Partly	4	3	Partly	3	3	Partly	3	3	Partly	4	3	Partly	4	3	Partly	4	4	Partly	4	4	Partly
Bulgaria*	2	2	Free	2	2	Free	2	2	Free	2	2	Free	2	2	Free	2	2	Free	2	2	Free	2	2	Free	2	2	Free
Croatia*	1	2	Free	1	2	Free	1	2	Free	1	2	Free	1	2	Free	1	2	Free	1	2	Free	1	2	Free	1	2	Free
Cyprus*	1	1	Free	1	1	Free	1	1	Free	1	1	Free	1	1	Free	1	1	Free	1	1	Free	1	1	Free	1	1	Free
Czech Republic*	1	1	Free	1	1	Free	1	1	Free	1	1	Free	1	1	Free	1	1	Free	1	1	Free	1	1	Free	1	1	Free
Denmark*	1	1	Free	1	1	Free	1	1	Free	1	1	Free	1	1	Free	1	1	Free	1	1	Free	1	1	Free	1	1	Free
Estonia*	1	1	Free	1	1	Free	1	1	Free	1	1	Free	1	1	Free	1	1	Free	1	1	Free	1	1	Free	1	1	Free
Finland*	1	1	Free	1	1	Free	1	1	Free	1	1	Free	1	1	Free	1	1	Free	1	1	Free	1	1	Free	1	1	Free
France*	1	1	Free	1	1	Free	1	1	Free	1	1	Free	1	1	Free	1	1	Free	1	1	Free	1	2	Free	1	2	Free
Germany*	1	1	Free	1	1	Free	1	1	Free	1	1	Free	1	1	Free	1	1	Free	1	1	Free	1	1	Free	1	1	Free
Greece*	1	2	Free	1	2	Free	2	2	Free	2	2	Free	2	2	Free	2	2	Free	2	2	Free	2	2	Free	2	2	Free
Hungary*	1	1	Free	1	1	Free	1	2	Free	1	2	Free	1	2	Free	2	2	Free	2	2	Free	3	2	Free	3	2	Free
Iceland*	1	1	Free	1	1	Free	1	1	Free	1	1	Free	1	1	Free	1	1	Free	1	1	Free	1	1	Free	1	1	Free
Ireland*	1	1	Free	1	1	Free	1	1	Free	1	1	Free	1	1	Free	1	1	Free	1	1	Free	1	1	Free	1	1	Free
Italy*	1	2	Free	1	2	Free	1	1	Free	2	1	Free	1	1	Free	1	1	Free	1	1	Free	1	1	Free	1	1	Free
Kosovo*	5	4	Partly	5	4	Partly	5	4	Partly	5	4	Partly	5	4	Partly	4	4	Partly	3	4	Partly	3	4	Partly	3	4	Partly
Latvia*	2	1	Free	2	2	Free	2	2	Free	2	2	Free	2	2	Free	2	2	Free	2	2	Free	1	2	Free	2	2	Free
Liechtenstein*	1	1	Free	1	1	Free	1	1	Free	1	1	Free	1	1	Free	1	1	Free	1	1	Free	2	1	Free	2	1	Free
Lithuania*	1	1	Free	1	1	Free	1	1	Free	1	1	Free	1	1	Free	1	1	Free	1	1	Free	1	1	Free	1	1	Free
Luxembourg*	1	1	Free	1	1	Free	1	1	Free	1	1	Free	1	1	Free	1	1	Free	1	1	Free	1	1	Free	1	1	Free
Macedonia	3	3	Partly	3	3	Partly	3	3	Partly	3	3	Partly	3	3	Partly	4	3	Partly	4	3	Partly	4	3	Partly	4	3	Partly
Malta*	1	1	Free	1	1	Free	1	1	Free	1	1	Free	1	1	Free	1	1	Free	1	1	Free	1	1	Free	1	1	Free
Monaco*	2	1	Free	2	1	Free	2	1	Free	2	1	Free	2	1	Free	2	1	Free	2	1	Free	3	1	Free	3	1	Free
Montenegro*	3	2	Free	3	2	Free	3	2	Free	3	2	Free	3	2	Free	3	2	Free	3	3	Partly	3	3	Partly	3	3	Partly
Netherlands*	1	1	Free	1	1	Free	1	1	Free	1	1	Free	1	1	Free	1	1	Free	1	1	Free	1	1	Free	1	1	Free
Norway*	1	1	Free	1	1	Free	1	1	Free	1	1	Free	1	1	Free	1	1	Free	1	1	Free	1	1	Free	1	1	Free
Poland*	1	1	Free	1	1	Free	1	1	Free	1	1	Free	1	1	Free	1	1	Free	1	1	Free	1	2	Free	1	2	Free
Portugal*	1	1	Free	1	1	Free	1	1	Free	1	1	Free	1	1	Free	1	1	Free	1	1	Free	1	1	Free	1	1	Free
Romania*	2	2	Free	2	2	Free	2	2	Free	2	2	Free	2	2	Free	2	2	Free	2	2	Free	2	2	Free	2	2	Free
San Marino*	1	1	Free	1	1	Free	1	1	Free	1	1	Free	1	1	Free	1	1	Free	1	1	Free	1	1	Free	1	1	Free
Serbia*	2	2	Free	2	2	Free	2	2	Free	2	2	Free	2	2	Free	2	2	Free	2	2	Free	3	2	Free	3	2	Free
Slovakia*	1	1	Free	1	1	Free	1	1	Free	1	1	Free	1	1	Free	1	1	Free	1	1	Free	1	1	Free	1	1	Free
Slovenia*	1	1	Free	1	1	Free	1	1	Free	1	1	Free	1	1	Free	1	1	Free	1	1	Free	1	1	Free	1	1	Free
Spain*	1	1	Free	1	1	Free	1	1	Free	1	1	Free	1	1	Free	1	1	Free	1	1	Free	1	1	Free	1	1	Free
Sweden*	1	1	Free	1	1	Free	1	1	Free	1	1	Free	1	1	Free	1	1	Free	1	1	Free	1	1	Free	1	1	Free
Switzerland*	1	1	Free	1	1	Free	1	1	Free	1	1	Free	1	1	Free	1	1	Free	1	1	Free	1	1	Free	1	1	Free
Turkey	3	3	Partly	3	3	Partly	3	3	Partly	3	4	Partly	3	4	Partly	3	4	Partly	3	4	Partly	4	5	Partly	5	6	Not
United Kingdom*	1	1	Free	1	1	Free	1	1	Free	1	1	Free	1	1	Free	1	1	Free	1	1	Free	1	1	Free	1	1	Free

== Middle East and North Africa ==
Note: The Middle East countries of Turkey, Cyprus, Georgia, Azerbaijan and Armenia can be found in the "Europe" and "Eurasia" sections of Freedom House's Freedom in the World report.

Key: * - Electoral democracies (as described above), PR - Political Rights, CL - Civil Liberties, Free Status: Free, Partly Free, Not Free

	2010			2011			2012			2013			2014			2015			2016			2017			2018		
Country	PR	CL	Free	PR	CL	Free	PR	CL	Free	PR	CL	Free	PR	CL	Free	PR	CL	Free	PR	CL	Free	PR	CL	Free	PR	CL	Free
Algeria	6	5	Not	6	5	Not	6	5	Not	6	5	Not	6	5	Not	6	5	Not	6	5	Not	6	5	Not	6	5	Not
Bahrain	6	5	Not	6	5	Not	6	6	Not	6	6	Not	6	6	Not	7	6	Not	7	6	Not	7	6	Not	7	6	Not
Egypt	6	5	Not	6	5	Not	6	5	Not	5	5	Partly	6	5	Not	6	5	Not	6	5	Not	6	5	Not	6	6	Not
Iran	6	6	Not	6	6	Not	6	6	Not	6	6	Not	6	6	Not	6	6	Not	6	6	Not	6	6	Not	5	6	Not
Iraq	5	6	Not	5	6	Not	5	6	Not	6	6	Not	5	6	Not	6	6	Not	5	6	Not	5	6	Not	5	6	Not
Israel*	1	2	Free	1	2	Free	1	2	Free	1	2	Free	1	2	Free	1	2	Free	1	2	Free	1	2	Free	1	3	Free
Jordan	6	5	Not	6	5	Not	6	5	Not	6	5	Not	6	5	Not	6	5	Not	6	5	Not	5	5	Partly	5	5	Partly
Kuwait	4	4	Partly	4	5	Partly	4	5	Partly	5	5	Partly	5	5	Partly	5	5	Partly	5	5	Partly	5	5	Partly	5	5	Partly
Lebanon	5	3	Partly	5	3	Partly	5	4	Partly	5	4	Partly	5	4	Partly	5	4	Partly	5	4	Partly	5	4	Partly	6	4	Partly
Libya	7	7	Not	7	7	Not	7	6	Not	4	5	Partly	4	5	Partly	6	6	Not	6	6	Not	7	6	Not	7	6	Not
Morocco	5	4	Partly	5	4	Partly	5	4	Partly	5	4	Partly	5	4	Partly	5	4	Partly	5	4	Partly	5	4	Partly	5	5	Partly
Oman	6	5	Not	6	5	Not	6	5	Not	6	5	Not	6	5	Not	6	5	Not	6	5	Not	6	5	Not	6	5	Not
Qatar	6	5	Not	6	5	Not	6	5	Not	6	5	Not	6	5	Not	6	5	Not	6	5	Not	6	5	Not	6	5	Not
Saudi Arabia	7	6	Not	7	6	Not	7	7	Not	7	7	Not	7	7	Not	7	7	Not	7	7	Not	7	7	Not	7	7	Not
Syria	7	6	Not	7	6	Not	7	7	Not	7	7	Not	7	7	Not	7	7	Not	7	7	Not	7	7	Not	7	7	Not
Tunisia*	7	5	Not	7	5	Not	3	4	Partly	3	4	Partly	3	3	Partly	1	3	Free	1	3	Free	1	3	Free	2	3	Free
United Arab Emirates	6	5	Not	6	5	Not	6	6	Not	6	6	Not	6	6	Not	6	6	Not	6	6	Not	6	6	Not	7	6	Not
Yemen	6	5	Not	6	5	Not	6	6	Not	6	6	Not	6	6	Not	6	6	Not	7	6	Not	7	6	Not	7	6	Not

== See also ==
- Freedom in the World
- Democracy Ranking
- Democracy-Dictatorship Index
- List of indices of freedom
- Index of Freedom in the World
- Polity data series
- Democracy in the Middle East
