= Human rights in Bulgaria =

Bulgaria joined the Council of Europe and ratified the European Convention on Human Rights in 1992 and joined the European Union in 2007. Despite this, Bulgarian compliance with human rights norms falls below the standard expected of an ECHR signatory. The European Court of Human Rights noted that of 596 applications concerning Bulgaria dealt with by the Court in 2022, 25 resulted in a judgement finding at least one human rights violation.

Although the Bulgarian media have a record of unbiased reporting, Bulgaria’s lack of specific legislation protecting the media from state interference is a theoretical weakness. Conditions in Bulgaria’s twelve aging and overcrowded prisons generally are poor. A probate reform in mid-2005 was expected to relieve prison overcrowding.

Bulgarian police have been accused of abusing prisoners and using illegal investigative methods, and institutional incentives discourage full reporting and investigation of many crimes. The Constitution of Bulgaria guarantees freedom of religion, but local governments have attempted to enforce special registration requirements on some groups not designated as historically entitled to full protection. Besides the Bulgarian Orthodox Church, the faiths so designated are the Jewish, Muslim, and Roman Catholic. Court backlogs and weak court administration make constitutional protection of defendants’ rights problematic in some instances.

== Institutions for children and adults with mental disabilities ==
The conditions in Bulgaria's network of institutions for children and adults with mental disabilities have raised concerns. The Mental Disability Advocacy Center has launched a collective complaint under the European Committee on Social Rights regarding the failure to provide education for children in social care homes run by the Ministry of Labour and Social Policy; and a case is currently pending before the European Court of Human Rights concerning the alleged failure to investigate inhuman and degrading treatment in institutions for adults. The documentary "Bulgaria's Abandoned Children" (TrueVision, 2007) was broadcast on BBC Four in the UK in September 2007, and depicts the deprivation of food, health-care and education for children at the institution in Mogilino. The widespread institutionalization of children in Bulgaria is unlikely to be consistent with the best interests of the child, and almost certainly violates Article 23 of the Convention on the Rights of the Child and Articles 11, 12 and 13 of the International Covenant on Economic, Social and Cultural Rights (ICESCR)

== Macedonian minority ==
There exists a small number of individuals identifying as ethnic Macedonian in the Blagoevgrad province of Bulgaria. According to the 2011 census 1,654 people declared themselves to be ethnic Macedonians and 561 from them were living in the Blagoevgrad Province. The Greek Helsinki Monitor reports that the "Bulgarian state and public opinion alike deny their right to self-identification", and that "any actions pertaining to public demonstration of the Macedonian identity in Bulgaria are subjected to a more or less direct suppression and denial". That considered, Macedonian is given as an option for nationality on the census. The Bulgarian majority (including the press) regards Macedonians living in Bulgaria as 'pure' Bulgarians.

Macedonians have been refused the right to register political parties (see United Macedonian Organization Ilinden and UMO Ilinden - PIRIN) on the grounds that the party was an "ethnic separatist organization funded by a foreign government", something that is against the Bulgarian constitution. The constitutional court has not however banned the Evroroma (Евророма) and MRF(ДПС) parties, who are widely considered as ethnic parties. The European Court of Human Rights held "unanimously, that there had been a violation of Article 11 (freedom of assembly and association) of the European Convention on Human Rights."

In November 2006, the members of the European Parliament Milan Horáček, Joost Lagendijk, Angelika Beer and Elly de Groen-Kouwenhoven introduced an amendment to the accession of Bulgaria to the European Union protocol calling “on the Bulgarian authorities to prevent any further obstruction to the registration of the political party of the ethnic Macedonians (OMO-Ilinden PIRIN) and to put an end to all forms of discrimination and harassment vis-à-vis that minority.”

On May 28, 2018, the European Court of Human Rights made two decisive rulings against Bulgaria in violation of Article 11 (freedom of assembly and association) of the Convention for the Protection of Human Rights and Fundamental Freedoms. In the two rulings: Case of Vasilev and Society of the Repressed Macedonians in Bulgaria Victims of the Communist Terror v. Bulgaria (Application no. 23702/15); and Case of Macedonian Club for Ethnic Tolerance in Bulgaria and Radonov v. Bulgaria (Application no. 67197/13), the European Court of Human Rights unanimously ruled that Bulgaria violated Article 11 (freedom of assembly and association) of the Convention for the Protection of Human Rights and Fundamental Freedoms, and that Bulgaria must pay a collective total of 16,000 euros to the applicants.

== Romani (Roma) ==
According to a report by Bureau of Democracy, Human Rights, and Labor from 2001, Bulgarian state security forces have been known to arbitrarily arrest and abuse street children of Romani ethnic origin. The Romani are subjected to harassment in Bulgaria, including the hazing of Romani army conscripts and poor police responses to crimes committed against Romani. A high percentage of Romani children do not attend school, both due to poverty and a lack of proficiency in Bulgarian. On the other hand, the mainly ethnic Roma, Free Bulgaria party has been allowed to run for elections and has achieved some success.

A report by the New York Times notes that during the COVID-19 pandemic "in the Roma suburb in Kyustendil, most roads are unpaved and strewn with garbage," and that Roma children have no access to computers and broad-band internet for learning during the pandemic. Kyustendil authorities claim the lockdowns in the town are to prevent the spread of the virus, while Roma activists claim bigotry.

== Human trafficking ==
There has been a growing awareness of human trafficking as a human rights issue in Europe (see main article: trafficking in human beings). The end of communism has contributed to an increase in human trafficking, with the majority of victims being women forced into prostitution. Bulgaria is a country of origin and country of transit for persons, primarily women and children, trafficked for the purpose of sexual exploitation. The Bulgarian government has shown some commitment to combat trafficking but has been criticized for failing to develop effective measures in law enforcement and victim protection.

== Religious freedom ==
The Constitution provides for freedom of religion; however, the law prohibits the public practice of religion by unregistered groups. The Constitution also designates Eastern Orthodox Christianity as the "traditional" religion. There were some reports of societal abuses or discrimination based on religious belief or practice. Discrimination, harassment, and general public intolerance, particularly in the media, of some religious groups remained an intermittent problem.

== International criticism ==
The European Court of Human Rights often holds that Bulgaria violates the European Convention on Human Rights. In 2015, the Court issued a special press release dedicated to a systemic problem of Bulgaria's justice system: it underlined that "in over 45 judgments against Bulgaria...the authorities had failed to comply with their obligation to carry out an effective investigation." The European Court of Human Rights has also handed down pilot judgments against Bulgaria - they are delivered when the Court identifies a series of applications pertaining to similar facts. For example, in the pilot judgment Neshkov v Bulgaria, the Court gave Bulgaria 18 months to improve prison conditions. Social activists have raised concern that Bulgaria is lagging behind other European Union Member States in a number of international indexes which measure the protection of civil rights and liberties. The Council of Europe has also expressed worries about Bulgaria's compromised rule of law.

== International rankings ==
- Freedom Index, 2023: 45 out of 165.
- Democracy Index, 2022: 57 out of 167.
- Worldwide Press Freedom Index, 2023: 71 out of 180.

== See also ==
- Human rights in Europe
- LGBT rights in Bulgaria
- Internet censorship and surveillance in Bulgaria
