= Human rights in Belize =

Human rights in Belize have been described as "free" by Freedom House. Concerns include government corruption, high rates of violent crime, police brutality and human trafficking. The United States Department of State has noted arbitrary killings, arbitrary arrests, inhuman and degrading treatment by security forces, poor treatment of refugees, extensive gender-based violence, and government corruption.

== Women's rights ==
The United States Department of State has noted that it has been reported by NGOs and other observers that women face social and economic discrimination, with fewer women in management and government positions and a gender pay gap.

The State Department has claimed "Gender-based violence remained an endemic problem" with women being victims of 86% of reported gender-based violence cases. There is a perception among the public that there isn't enough police action against gender-based violence.

Sexual assault has been reported as an issue in the Belize Defence Force.

== Workers rights ==
As of 2023, the right of workers to form trade unions is respected by the government. The State Department has reported "antiunion discrimination" and intimidation of workers for joining unions by employers, particularly in the agricultural sector among immigrant workers from other part of Central America.

== See also ==
- LGBTQ rights in Belize
- Prostitution in Belize
