= Human rights in the Federated States of Micronesia =

The Federated States of Micronesia (Abbreviated FSM) is a United States Associated State consisting of 4 states across the Western Pacific Ocean. The estimated population in 2015 was 105,216. Formerly the FSM was a part of the Trust Territory of the Pacific Islands (TTPI) but in 1979 formed its own constitutional government. FSM has a written constitution which took effect in 1979 and has been amended only once in 1990. By virtue of membership in the United Nations, the FSM abides by the UN Declaration of Human Rights (UDHR). Key human rights concerns in FSM include judicial delays, government corruption, discrimination against women, domestic violence and child neglect.

== The Constitution of the Federated States of Micronesia ==
The Federated States of Micronesia formed its own constitutional government on May 10, 1979 and was admitted to the United Nations on September 17, 1991. The FSM Constitution was built around incorporation of the UDHR which has provided for recognition and protection of human rights. Two sections in the Constitution provide for equal protection. Under Art 4 section 3 there is a provision that states that "no one shall be denied the equal protection of the laws." Additionally Art 4 section 4 provides that equal protection of the laws may not be denied or impaired on account of sex, race, ancestry, national origin, language, or social status.

An important provision of the UDHR is article 4 which provides that no one shall be held in slavery or servitude and that slavery and the slave trade are prohibited. Article 4 Section 10 provides that slavery and involuntary servitude are prohibited except to punish crime

Similarly article 5 of the UDHR provides that "No one shall be subjected to torture or to cruel, inhuman or degrading treatment or punishment." The Federated States of Micronesia have incorporated this significant human right into their constitution under article 4 subsection 8 which provides that a prisoner has a "constitutional right to be free from cruel and unusual punishment and his due process rights."

Article 10 of the UDHR states that "Everyone is entitled in full equality to a fair and public hearing by an independent and impartial tribunal, in the determination of his rights and obligations and of any criminal charge against him." These rights are assured by the FSM Constitution under article 4 subsection 3. This provides that "A person may not be deprived of life, liberty, or property without due process of law, or be denied the equal protection of the laws."

== LGBT rights ==
Homosexual activity is legal in the Federated States of Micronesia but there is little protection in terms of discrimination. The country is very conservative, and the LGBT community are very discreet. Whilst same-sex marriage is not permissible as such, there is no law that prevents same-sex couples from getting married. Similarly no laws prohibit discrimination against LGBT persons in employment, housing, or access to education and health care, however despite there being no reports of violence, official or societal discrimination, or workplace discrimination against the LGBT community, it is "rare for individuals to identify themselves publicly as LGBT persons."

== Women's rights ==
The Convention on the Elimination of All Forms of Discrimination Against Women (CEDAW) is a legally binding international human rights treaty in the FSM. This treaty provides leverage for law changes and formation of new legislation to protect Women's rights in the FSM. Despite this Convention being ratified in 2004, a 2004 review indicated that the FSM was non-compliant on 61% of the recognised indicators of legal compliance.

Under the FSM Constitution the legal rights of women are protected, and discrimination on the grounds of sex is prohibited. Although there is no national legislation criminalising sexual assault, FSM has legislation criminalising both sexual assault with penetration and sexual intercourse with girls under 13.

There have been issues in Pohnpei because sexual assault is inadmissible if the complainant and offender live together in a voluntary sexual relationship. There is no domestic violence or sexual harassment legislation in place and fault-based divorce is still practiced across the FSM, however there are increasing levels of domestic violence and gender-based being reported in the country. The Government has acknowledged the need for concrete data on the nature and incidence of domestic violence against women.

68% of women in the Pacific Islands are affected by gender based violence. As a result, there are a number of programmes and initiatives being implemented in Pacific Islands such as FSM to improve the level of women's rights, these include:

- Ending Violence Against Women (EVAW) Programme: providing knowledge for strengthened EVAW legislation
- Women's Economic Empowerment Programme: providing support and increased knowledge for decision makers on the economic situation for women in FSM.

There have been a number of recommendations by Australia in a recent report to curtail violence against women in the country. These include:

- Providing social services, particularly counselling services to women suffering from violence
- Create shelters and other social services institutions with health, counseling, and security staff adequately trained to serve abused women and children.
- Locate shelters for abused women and their children close by a respected local leader to provide them with further security from the abusers.
- Strengthen the health system through the development of medical protocols and capacity building programs for medical staff to better respond to VAW.

Similarly the Universal Periodic Review in 2010 have made comments regarding recommendations on women's rights in Micronesia. Some states expressed concern over limitations in women's rights, with Algeria, Argentina, and the United States of America identifying a "visible gender gap" still persisting in the areas of health, education and employment. Brazil, Slovakia, and Spain made recommendations which ranged from putting into law a minimal period of maternity leave for women employees, to advising more thorough legislation on marriage issues.

More recently in FSM, women were active and increasingly successful in private business. In 2015 it was reported that a number of women ran successful retail businesses in all four states, and the largest employers were the national and state governments, and female employees received equal pay for equal work.

== Methods of protecting human rights ==
The FSM have acceded to numerous international legal treaties. These include, amongst others, the U.N. Convention on the Rights of the Child, the Optional Protocol on the Involvement of Children in Armed Conflict and the Convention for the Suppression of the Traffic in Persons and of the Exploitation of the Prostitution of Others. The delegation stressed that Micronesia's lack of resources made it difficult for them to accede to more international treaties, but nevertheless gave assurances that the country would continue looking into different treaties with the aim of joining more in the future.

The four pillars of the Pacific Plan provide strategies and activities towards protecting Pacific cultural, economic, legal, political and spiritual rights. The Vision of this plan states "We seek a Pacific region that is respected for the quality of its governance, the sustainable management of its resources, the observation of democratic values and for its defense and promotion of human rights."

The Preamble to the Constitution of the Federated States of Micronesia further highlights a desire to protect human rights by stating in the preamble that "(The FSM)...affirm our common wish to live together in peace and harmony; to preserve the heritage of the past, and to protect the promise of the future"

The FSM has been described as a "a source country for women subjected to trafficking in persons, specifically forced prostitution in the US and the US territory of Guam, and has reportedly been a destination country for women from China forced into commercial sexual exploitation. The Government does not fully comply with the minimum standards for the elimination of trafficking, however it is making significant efforts to do so. Responding to the concerns about trafficking, the FSM issued a national task-force to deal with the situation and offer solutions.

In addition, the Millennium Development Goals programme has suggested a three step implementation programme to reduce poverty and maximise human rights in the country, this states that the FSM should be:

- Using GIS technology, map the three components of poverty defined by the ADB (poverty of services, poverty of opportunity, and poverty of expenditures/income). This will identify communities and geographic areas at greatest risk of poverty.
- Using the results of the mapping exercise, develop population specific strategies to address hardship and need by combining macro-economic interventions with targeted anti-poverty interventions and involving the communities/households most affected in planning.
- Develop a formal National Poverty Alleviation Strategy to be integrated into the National Sustainable Development Plan that links macro-economic interventions with population specific economic and non-economic interventions.

== Protection of children ==
Despite being party to The Convention on the Rights of the Child, Human Rights NGOs have described the "Realisation of Children's Rights Index" as having "noticeable problems." This is because whilst attendance is compulsory for children in school from the age of 6, "due to a severe shortage of qualified teachers not all children have the chance to receive an education."

Child abuse in FSM is illegal, however concerns have arisen because the Constitution provides for a right of parental discipline, causing many cases of child abuse to go unreported.

The government has passed laws against the trafficking and sexual exploitation of children. There is a maximum penalty of 30 years' imprisonment and a $50,000 fine for such an offence. Additionally the Statutory rape laws apply to children 13 years or younger in Yap and Kosrae and 15 years or younger in Pohnpei. Problems have arisen with inconsistencies in legislation concerning filming explicit movies of underage children. The islands of Chuuk and Pohnpei have provisions against filming explicit movies of underage children, but Yap and Kosrae have no such provisions.

Despite high levels of protection in the domestic legal framework, the FSM is not a party to the 1980 Hague Convention on the Civil Aspects of International Child Abduction, which provides for an expeditious method to return a child internationally abducted by a parent from one member country to another.
