= Prostitution in Belize =

Prostitution in Belize is legal, but the buying of sexual services is not. Associated activities such as operating a brothel, loitering for the purposes of prostitution and soliciting sex are also illegal.

Prostitution is widespread and takes place on the streets and in brothels, bars, nightclubs and hotels.

Although denied by the Belize government, the country is a destination for sex tourism. Child sex tourism is a problem, primarily serving visitors from the United States. Sex trafficking is also a problem in the country.

== Legal situation ==
Whilst prostitution is legal, the buying of sexual services is not.

Related activities such as procuring another person to work as a prostitute, providing premises for prostitution and living off the earnings of prostitution are illegal. Keeping, managing or assisting in the management of a brothel is also prohibited. Liquor licensing laws prohibit prostitution in bars.

The Summary Jurisdiction (Offences) Act Chapter 98 prohibits "common prostitutes" (women who have previously received a police warning) from soliciting in a street or public place for the purpose of prostitution. "Male persons" are prohibited from loitering for the purpose of prostitution, or to persistently solicit or importune for immoral purposes.

The laws treat prostitution offences as nuisances and penalties are small.

The Trafficking in Persons Prohibition Act of 2003 combats trafficking, but the maximum penalty is low, compared to other countries, at 5 years imprisonment or $5,000 fine.

The Immigration laws prohibit the entry into the country of prostitutes or any person living off the proceeds of prostitution.

The laws are commonly not enforced, and law enforcement officials are often corrupt.

== Brothels ==
Although illegal, brothels are widespread in the country. Orange Walk Town is reputed to have the highest concentration of brothels.

In June 2011, the country's best known brothel, Raul's Rose Garden, was burnt down. It had first opened in February 1981. Before their withdrawal in the 1990s, the establishment was popular with British soldiers.

Some hotels operate a "ficha" system. Prostitutes rent rooms in the hotel and attract clients in the bar. The women are paid commission on the drinks bought by the clients before going to the rooms. The rent of the room is taken out of the commission. These hotels are often connected to nightclubs or go-go bars.

=== Military brothels ===
To try to combat the spread of STIs, including HIV, and by inter-governmental agreement, a number of brothels were set up for the exclusive use of British troops stationed in the country. The prostitutes, many from Guatemala, had to carry a photo identification card and undergo weekly health checks. The use of condoms was mandatory.

== Sex trafficking ==
Belize is a source, transit, and destination country for men, women, and children subjected to sex trafficking. The UN Special Rapporteur on Trafficking in Persons reported family members facilitate the sex trafficking of Belizean women and girls. In tourist regions, foreign child sex tourists, primarily from the United States, exploit child sex trafficking victims. Sex trafficking of Belizean and foreign women and girls, primarily from Central America, occur in bars, nightclubs, brothels, and domestic service. LGBTI men, women, and children are vulnerable to sex trafficking. Foreign men, women, and children—particularly from Central America, Mexico, and Asia—migrate voluntarily to Belize in search of work and are often exploited by traffickers who recruit victims using false promises of relatively high-paying jobs. Some migrants are subjected to sex trafficking. Trafficking-related complicity by government officials remains a problem.

The United States Department of State Office to Monitor and Combat Trafficking in Persons ranks Belize as a Tier 3 country.
