= Human rights in Grenada =

While making consistent progress, Human Rights in Grenada remains a concern for the nation. Based on periodic evaluations, Grenada has made significant gains on the issue of human rights. Its government is noted for demonstrating recognition and protection of the human rights of its citizens. Problems, however, still exist and these include allegations of police brutality, child abuse, and violence against women.

== Background ==
Human rights in Grenada are guaranteed by the country’s constitution and various legal frameworks as part of its obligations to the international agreements that it is part of. As a member of the United Nations, it is a signatory to the Universal Declaration of Human Rights. It is also a member of the Organization of American States (OAS) and adheres to the American Declaration of Human Rights. Its human rights record and obligations, thus, are monitored and evaluated by human rights commissions at the universal and regional levels. As part of the UN Convention Against Torture, for instance, it accedes to its Universal Periodic Review. Grenada, however, does not accept the jurisdiction of the Inter-American Court of Human Rights.

As legal protections for human rights in Grenada are enshrined in the country’s legal system, the judiciary plays an important role in upholding human rights. Mechanisms that protect and uphold human rights include the Office of the Ombudsman. It is mandated to address complaints involving the government and its officials as well as human rights abuses. Human rights watchdogs describe Grenada as a country with strong constitutional and regulatory frameworks that protect its citizens from human rights violations.

== Police brutality ==
Despite legal protections, there are still human rights issues that persist in Grenada and these include allegations of police brutality. Grenada’s police force, the Royal Grenada Police Force (RGPF), maintains the country’s law and order. While it is controlled by civilian authorities, there were still allegations of abuse by the police. In October 2023, members of the RGPF were accused of committing violence against a man using a metal pipe. The incident sparked nationwide outrage as the man was shown half-naked, tied and being dragged towards a police vehicle. There were previous cases of violence such as in 2011, when four police officers were accused of manslaughter after beating the Grenadian-born Canadian citizen Oscar Bartholomew, who died due to the attack. From 1993 to 1995, Amnesty International had also identified several victims of reported police brutality, which included the killing of Lawrence Lincoln Adolphose.

== Domestic violence ==
Violence committed against women and children is still widespread in Grenada. A study published in 2022 revealed that 29 percent of women in the country experienced physical or sexual violence in their lifetime. This is the case even if the country was already able to pass a domestic violence legislation in 2011.

Through legislation such as the Child (Protection and Adoption) Act, Chapter 44A, (No. 20 of 2010), the rights of children are recognized and protected. An earlier iteration of this law, which was passed in 1998, established the Division of Social Services, which provided social services and counseling to children and families. The Child Act of 2010 allows the investigation of actual and suspected cases of physical, sexual, and emotional abuse of children. The Grenadian government also introduced several initiatives such as the Ministry of Social Development’s national parenting program, which educates parents on issues such as child care and the healthy development of children within families.

However, despite measures established to protect children, cases of abuse still exist. Particularly, sexual abuse is a recurring problem. It is reported that one-third of Grenadian children suffered sexual violence and that many of these cases are unresolved due to stigma that drives families not to report such incidents.

The legal framework that protects women and children has so far been undermined by limited enforcement. Attempts to address this include the launching of the Special Victims Unit within the RGPF. This unit is tasked to deal with sexual assault, domestic violence, and child abuse.

== Other abuses ==
There are also other recorded abuses aside from police brutality and domestic violence and these include government impunity. From 2017 to 2018, for instance, the Grenadian government attempted to take over the Grenadian Hotel from its owners. It only abandoned the move after the hotel was sold to another company.
