= Human rights in Mauritius =

Human rights in Mauritius has been cited in recent years for its good track record. A 2018 European Union report identified it as the top-ranking African country in terms of governance and for its record in the protection and respect for human rights. Human rights issues, however, still persist and these include gender-based violence, domestic violence, and the lack of protection of children and members of the LGBTQ community. There are also incidents of abuses perpetrated by the government such as unlawful arrest, invasion of privacy, censorship, and violence, among others.

== Government abuses ==
A 2022 human rights report identified government abuses as part the notable problems in Mauritius. It specifically cited the following issues:

- cruel, inhuman, and degrading treatment by the government;
- arbitrary arrest;
- illegal invasion of privacy;
- restrictions on the media and free speech;
- censorship;
- violence and harassments that target racial or ethnic minority groups.

The US State Department noted that the government of Mauritius does not always prosecute and penalize government officials and security forces who commit the aforementioned abuses. The United Nations Committee on Torture also noted that while institutional reforms have been undertaken and legislations exist covering cases such as torture and human trafficking, the punishments do not correspond to the grave nature of the offenses. In cases of prosecution, the punishment is not consistent and would often be politically influenced.

== Gender-based abuses ==
In Mauritius, women have been traditionally viewed as subordinate to men particularly in terms of role occupied in society. The government has taken steps to address this problem. These include the elimination of various legal restrictions on women such as in cases of emigration, inheritance, and even in holding roles such as jury in courts. Beginning in 1989, the government also mandated the existence of “Equal Employment Opportunity Officers” in major governmental ministries in order to advance women’s interests.

However, there is still no comprehensive legislation in Mauritius that ensures the equal treatment of women, hampering the previously mentioned initiatives. By 1994, there are still no laws that deal with gender-based or domestic violence. Data collected by the government’s Women’s Rights and Family Welfare as well as non-governmental organizations, revealed that violence against women is still widespread.

It is also found that women comprised 57 percent of the unemployed with a total of 11.4 percent unemployment rate in comparison with the 5.5 percentage for men. This data published in 2014 is notable as it revealed that the unemployed women were more qualified than unemployed men.

== LGBTQ discrimination ==
By 2015, there is still a gap when it comes to legislations that address gender identity, gender expression, and sex characteristics. A dichotomy exists as demonstrated in the case of the Equal Opportunities Act of 2008. This law provides protection against discrimination on the basis of gender and sexual orientation but it does not include gender identity.

It is also noted that while Article 9 in Chapter 2 of the Mauritian Constitution guarantees the protection for privacy of home and other property, the Mauritius Criminal Code Act 1838, criminalized the sexual act of sodomy. Although consensual sexual act is private, the law provided that the police can enter a domicile on the mere suspicion that two adult homosexuals may be engaged in sexual intercourse. The decriminalization of same-sex relations was only passed in 2023. This development is attributed to the efforts of Mauritian LGBT organization Arc-en-Ciel as well as other human rights groups advancing equality and inclusion.

The lack of clear and comprehensive body of laws that protect members of the LGBTQ community created conditions for the violations of their rights not just by the government but also other parties. In 2018, a gay Pride march was blocked by a group of hostile demonstrators. Presently, although Mauritius still does not recognize same-sex marriage, it is considered one of the most LGBT-friendly countries in Africa, ranking fourth in terms of the public’s tolerance for gay marriage.
