= Human rights in Guinea-Bissau =

Guinea-Bissau’s human rights records has recently been positively cited due to the successes of several non-governmental organizations and human rights activists. In the country’s history, however, human rights abuses had been perpetrated during periods of political turmoil and conflict. Overall, the situation of human rights in Guinea-Bissau has been described as a reflection of the political, social, economic, and cultural path the country took since independence.

== Independence and human rights ==
After Guinea-Bissau’s independence, the liberation movement African Party for the Independence of Guinea and Cape Verde (PAIGC) dominated the government for many years. It initially adopted the Marxist-Leninist political and economic systems. The move to centralize power and socialize the country’s economy had resulted to an inefficient state apparatus that increased the incidence of poverty. It also led to a spate of human rights violations as the state security executed individuals branded as collaborators of the Portuguese regime. The nascent state also faced a series of internal conflicts, violence, and instability, which created conditions for the violation of civil liberties.

The dictatorial and autocratic rule was followed by four military coup d’état, a civil war, and the murder of the country’s independence leader, Amílcar Cabral. The internal strife that emerged during these periods of instability led to perpetuation of human rights abuses. After Cabral’s death, he was succeeded by his brother and PAIGC co-founder, Luís Cabral. The new government then attempted to consolidate power by imprisoning individuals suspected of participating in coup plots without trial. Cabral was overthrown during the military takeover in 1980.

== Vieira’s regime ==
After the coup, Brigadier Joao Bernardo Vieira was installed as President of the national revolutionary council, which was composed of military officers. By 1981, the national congress passed a law establishing PAIGC as the single national party under the pretext that the initiatives were being pursued in preparation for national elections and the formation of a permanent governmental structure. In 1994, the first multiparty election was held in Guinea-Bissau and Vieira emerged victorious. Under this new regime, the prominent human rights problems included:

- Violent dispersal of demonstrations
- Poor prison conditions
- Corruption and impunity
- Violence and discrimination against women
- Female genital mutilation
- Child labor
- Child trafficking

Vieira was also overthrown after a bitter civil war from June 1998 to May 1999. After this conflict was concluded and Kumba Ialá assumed power, there were only few reports of the massacres and systematic torture that often come with civil wars. During Yala’s regime, which ended the 26 years of PAIGC governance, human rights abuses continued at the hands of security forces. Human rights activists, journalists, and ordinary citizens were subjected to torture and imprisonment. These were perpetrated with impunity because opposing political parties and the civic society were too intimidated to serve as counterweight to Yala’s rule.

== Recent developments ==
During the United Nations’ 2015 Universal Periodic Review (UPR), which evaluated Guinea-Bissau’s human rights performance in terms of legislative developments, it was found that the country has made progress in the area of equality. It has recognized discrimination based on sexual orientation and gender identity as a serious state concern. The state also reaffirmed the constitutional guarantee for the equality of all citizens.

By 2021, human rights issues include reports of harassment, arbitrary detentions, and physical assault involving activists and journalists who criticize the government.
