= Human rights in Tonga =

Tonga is a constitutional monarchy with a population of approximately 130,000. Politics and the economy are dominated by the king, the nobility, and a few prominent commoners. Economic, social and cultural rights are generally well respected. There are, however, a number of issues concerning protection of civil and political rights, particularly freedom of expression, and rights to political participation. Violence against women is a serious issue.

== International treaties ==
Tonga joined the United Nations in 1999. It is party to two of the nine core human rights treaties - the Convention on the Rights of the Child (CRC) and the International Convention for the Elimination of All Forms of Racial Discrimination (CERD). In May 2008, during its Universal Periodic Review (UPR) by the United Nations Human Rights Council, Tonga accepted recommendations to ratify some of the other treaties including the International Covenant on Civil and Political Rights (ICCPR), the International Covenant on Economic, Social and Cultural Rights (ICESCR), the Convention on the Elimination of All Forms of Discrimination Against Women (CEDAW), and the Convention Against Torture (CAT). Although public consultation has taken place in relation to ratification of CEDAW, opponents are concerned and protested that it could open the way for same-sex marriage and abortion.

== Constitutional protections ==
Domestic human rights protections include a Declaration of Rights in the 1875 Constitution of Tonga. This protects a number of civil and political rights such as prohibition of slavery (clause 2), equality before the law (clause 4), freedom of religion (clause 5), freedom of speech (clause 7), and a number of criminal procedure rights (clauses 9–16). Notable omissions from the Declaration of Rights are the right to life, freedom from torture, freedom from discrimination and comprehensive protections for economic and social rights.

== Women's rights ==
Along with Palau, Tonga is one of only two countries in the Pacific region (and seven countries in the world) that is yet to ratify the Convention on the Elimination of All Forms of Discrimination Against Women (CEDAW). In September 2009, the Tongan Legislative Assembly voted 18 to 1 with 4 abstentions not to ratify CEDAW. In announcing the decision not to ratify, the Tongan Prime Minister stated that ratification 'would cut across our cultural and social heritage that makes up the Tongan way of life.' Further, Tonga did not want to ratify with reservations or undertake a 'ratification of convenience.'

In 2013, Tonga enacted the Family Protection Act 2013. Violence against women appears to be pervasive in Tonga, although there is limited empirical data available. According to the Tongan NGO Legal Literacy Project of the Catholic Women's League, estimates suggest that between 31% and 62% of women are victims of violence by an intimate partner. Marital rape was criminalised in 2013. Women are able to lease land, but they are unable to own land. Inheritance to land title passes through male heirs. This is a significant barrier to the economic empowerment of women in Tonga.

Abortion is illegal in Tonga, with a penalty of up to 7 years imprisonment.

== Freedom of expression ==
Although the Constitution provides for freedom of speech and of the press, these rights are not always protected in practice. Politicians and media outlets seeking greater democracy often have their rights curtailed. For example, since 2008, the board of the government-owned Tonga Broadcasting Commission has directed that all programming be reviewed by TBC appointed censors prior to broadcast. There are also a number of cases where attempts to limit media freedom have been challenged. See for example, Utoikamanu v Lali Media Group Ltd and Taione v Kingdom of Tonga.

== Political participation ==
An ongoing issue in Tonga for many years has been the absence of full representative democracy. After a process of constitutional reform, in the November 2010 elections, a majority of the seats (17 out of 26) in the Tongan Parliament were elected by universal suffrage, with the remaining nine seats being reserved for members of Tonga's nobility. This marked a shift away from the 165-year rule of the monarchy towards a fully representative democracy. The Taimi Media Network described it as "Tonga’s first democratically elected Parliament".

== Sexual minorities ==
Sodomy is illegal in Tonga, with a maximum penalty of 10 years' imprisonment, although there have been no prosecutions for such offences in recent years. During its Universal Periodic Review in 2008, Tonga rejected three recommendations from the Netherlands, Canada and the Czech Republic to decriminalise same-sex conduct and one recommendation from Bangladesh to continue to criminalise same-sex conduct. Instead, Tonga noted that “[w]hilst current laws might criminalise certain consensual sexual conduct, Tonga is a Christian society that believes in tolerance and respect across difference. A respect for difference allows the widest margin of appreciation to lawmakers as well as other stakeholders and encourages robust debate about equality within society.” This response leaves Tonga's position open for future UPR reviews which may eventually result in a positive human rights outcome.

== National human rights institution ==
Tonga does not have a national human rights institution. There is however a Public Complaints Commissioner who receives and investigates complaints about government departments. The Tongan Government has also indicated that it is considering establishing a national human rights institution.

== Capital punishment ==
The death penalty is legal in Tonga, but has not been imposed since 1982. Tonga is considered an abolitionist in practice. Tonga and Papua New Guinea are the last Pacific Island countries to retain the death penalty.
