= Human rights in the Czech Republic =

Human rights in the Czech Republic are generally regarded as adequate, with some lingering issues. In recent years, the Czech Republic has made significant strides in upholding and protecting the human rights of individuals. As a member state of international organizations such as the United Nations (UN) and the European Union (EU), it is a signatory to several treaties that require the state to guarantee human rights. Despite this, there are still lingering human rights issues, which include violence against women and discrimination against vulnerable groups such as the Roma people and members of the LGBTQI community.

== Background ==
The Czech constitution was adopted in 1993 after the country’s split with Slovakia. It is the fundamental framework that guarantees freedom and human rights in the Czech Republic. These include freedom of expression, assembly, and association. The constitution is, particularly, explicit in its prohibition of discrimination through the Czech Charter of Fundamental Rights and Freedom, a section of the charter that defines the concept of equality. Discrimination based on gender is prohibited in Article 3(1), which guarantees the rights and liberties of everyone regardless of sex. Adherence to equality is also part of the Czech accession to the European Union. By 2010, the country has maintained a high profile in the UN Human Rights Council’s Universal Periodic Review.

== Discrimination ==
Roma

The Czech Republic has a history of discrimination against the Roma people. From 1993 to 2017, it pursued a policy of segregation of Roma children in Czech schools, particularly those with mild mental disabilities. During this period, it was reported that the country has violated the international norm of racial equality of this minority group in a technically legal fashion. Here, subtle legal practices that undermine human rights and equality are perpetrated.

After the Russian invasion of Ukraine, the Czech Republic registered the third-highest number of Ukrainian refugees in the European Union. By October 2022, this number reached 453,725 and was still increasing. Among the refugees were those who belong to the Roma ethnic group. According to Amnesty International, hundreds of these were subjected to discrimination, including discriminatory pronouncements made by the office of the Public Defender of Rights. It is claimed that they were made to wait longer than others. There were also reports of Romas being denied help for several weeks, segregated from other refugees, and forced to live in substandard conditions.

Women and children

The Czech legal framework guarantees women’s rights, which include the freedom to engage in the political process. It was found, however, that women’s involvement in elected bodies remains low when compared to men’s. Experts cited by the United Nations noted that structural patterns within the Czech society not only determined women’s status but may also impede it.

Violence against Czech women also remains an important human rights issue. In 2021, the European Institute for Gender Equality (EIGE) reported that 44% of women experienced harassment in the past five years and about 25% of those who reported physical or sexual assault experienced it at home. The U.S. State Department cited that there are observers who reported that some Roma women have faced obstructions when accessing healthcare and reproductive healthcare.

It is also noted that the majority of the Ukrainian refugees are women and children, constituting 47% and 33% of the refugee population, respectively. Through an EU policy, the Czech Republic has committed to the extension of the temporary protection status until the refugees return to Ukraine. Although the majority of the Czech population supports hosting the refugees, this protection status entailed reduced financial aid. The UNHR also noted that, like in other cases of refugee experience, women fleeing to the Czech Republic tend to be more at risk of difficulties such as exploitation and abuse.

Violation of children’s rights in the Czech Republic was highlighted in 2017 when the International Commission of Jurists (ICJ) lodged a complaint against the state before the Council of European Committee of Social Rights. The complaint cited that the Czech Republic was violating the rights of children under 15, who faced proceedings in the child justice system. The committee found that the Czech Republic violated children’s rights due to its failure to provide child protection under Article 17 of the European Social Charter of 1961.

LGBTQ

Non-governmental organizations have reported incidences of harassment and homophobia in the Czech Republic. By 2022, there was an uptick in reported cases of hate crimes, which included verbal and physical attacks. In August of the same year, the Prague Pride march was disrupted by an anonymous bomb threat. Demonstrators chanting homophobic slogans also disrupted the Prague Pride parade the year after.

== State abuses ==
In 2021, an ombudswoman investigating the death of a Roma man found that security forces committed several violations in the treatment of victim, including delayed responses that could have provided appropriate medical care. A report by the U.S. State Department in the same year noted that there are no reported cases of torture and forced disappearances in the Czech Republic. Impunity is also not a significant problem for the country.

Challenges in the bureaucracy that affect human rights include corruption. For instance, Ivan Elischer, a judge of the High Court in Prague was found guilty of accepting bribes in exchange for reduced sentences in drug trials and increased punishments out of revenge. Other issues include the unauthorized use of government databases to search for derogatory information as well as the leaking of information in exchange of payments.
