= Index of Freedom in the World =

Index of civil liberties published in 2012

The Index of Freedom in the World is an index of civil liberties published in late 2012 by Canada's Fraser Institute, Germany's Liberales Institut, and the U.S. Cato Institute. The index is the predecessor of the Human Freedom Index, which has been published annually since 2015. The coauthors of both indexes are Ian Vásquez and Tanja Porčnik (née Štumberger).

The index is based on measures of freedom of speech, freedom of religion, individual economic choice, freedom of association, freedom of assembly, violence and crimes, freedom of movement, and women's rights. Other components of the Freedom Index include human trafficking, sexual violence, female genital mutilation, and homicide.

The index rates countries on a scale from 10 (freest) to 0 (least free). In 2012, the freest countries/regions were New Zealand (8.88), Switzerland (8.82), and Hong Kong SAR, (8.81). Least free were Syria (3.79), Venezuela (3.80), and Yemen (4.30). The components on which the index is based can be divided into economic freedoms and other personal freedoms. Highest ranking in economic freedoms were Hong Kong (8.91) and Singapore (8.71). Highest ranking in personal freedoms were U.S.A. (9.45) and the Netherlands (9.28).

The Freedom Index does not measure democracy, but it does measure freedom of speech and media, press killings, political imprisonment, etc. According to the report, democracy may be the form of government that best protects freedom, but democracy may both increase and reduce freedom. Nevertheless, democracy strongly correlates with freedom (7.9), as measured by the Economist Intelligence Unit's Democracy Index and the Freedom Index.

The Freedom Index is included as part of the book Towards a Worldwide Index of Human Freedom, written by 13 academics and economists from Canada (Fraser Institute), the United States (Cato Institute, Emory University), Germany (Liberales Institut, Goethe University Frankfurt), and Russia (Institute of Economic Analysis). Among other claims, the report argues that the criminalization of and the war on drugs have restricted many components of freedom.

== See also ==
- Economic Freedom of the World, an annual survey produced by the Fraser Institute
- List of freedom indices
