= Freedom of Thought Report =

Annual human-rights report on discrimination against non-religious people

The Freedom of Thought Report is an annual report produced by Humanists International that surveys discrimination against non-religious people—including humanists and atheists—worldwide. First published in 2012, the report is published online with a country chapter for each country in a "Country Index", and Humanists International also releases a downloadable PDF "Key Countries Edition".

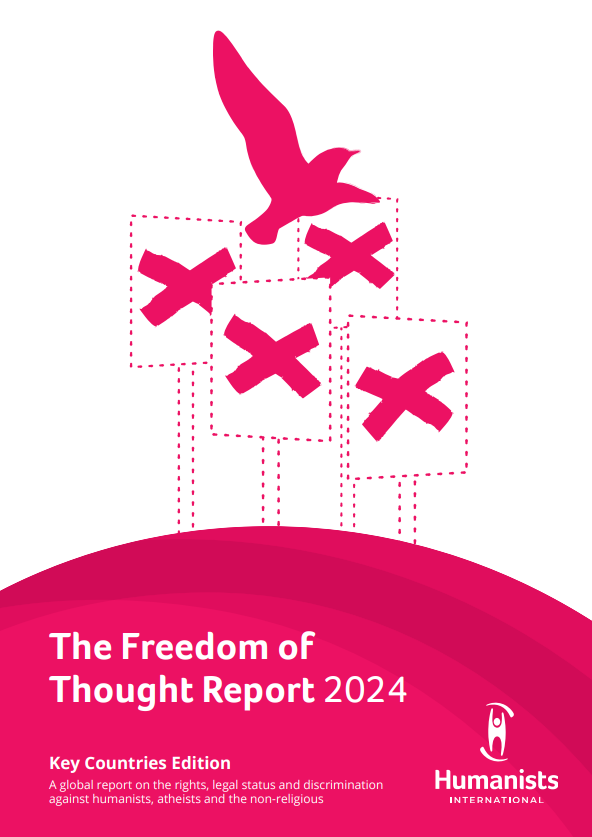
Cover of the 2024 Freedom of Thought Report Key Countries Edition

== Methodology and ratings ==
Each country is assessed against a set of "boundary conditions". Each condition is associated with one of four thematic strands ("Constitution and government", "Education and children's rights", "Society and community", and "Freedom of expression, humanist values") and contributes to one of five severity levels ("Free and equal", "Mostly satisfactory", "Systemic discrimination", "Severe discrimination" and "Grave violations").

Humanists International publishes the assessment data as open data under a Creative Commons Attribution-ShareAlike 4.0 licence.

== Findings ==
The report includes maps that colour countries by the most severe boundary condition applied in each category, as well as a "summary score" based on average severity across all four categories.

=== Maps ===
Freedom of Thought Report 2024 – Summary score

Key

Grave violations (5) Severe discrimination (4) Systemic discrimination (3) Mostly satisfactory (2) Free and equal (1) No rating

Freedom of Thought 2024 Report basic summary scores by country (1 = best, 5 = worst).

=== List ===
Freedom of Thought Report category scores by country
Country	"Constitution and government"	"Education and children's rights"	"Society and community"	"Freedom of expression, humanist values"	Basic Summary Score
Afghanistan	5	5	5	5	5.00
Albania	3	1	4	2	2.50
Algeria	4	4	4	4	4.00
Andorra	3	0	4	4	3.67
Angola	3	1	4	4	3.00
Antigua and Barbuda	3	1	4	4	3.00
Argentina	3	3	3	2	2.75
Armenia	3	3	4	3	3.25
Australia	3	3	1	3	2.50
Austria	3	1	1	3	2.00
Azerbaijan	3	1	4	4	3.00
The Bahamas	3	2	4	1	2.50
Bahrain	5	4	4	5	4.50
Bangladesh	4	5	5	4	4.50
Barbados	2	2	4	3	2.75
Belarus	3	4	4	4	3.75
Belgium	1	1	1	1	1.00
Belize	3	3	4	2	3.00
Benin	2	1	3	3	2.25
Bhutan	3	1	3	3	2.50
Bolivia	3	1	4	2	2.50
Bosnia and Herzegovina	4	3	4	2	3.25
Botswana	3	2	2	2	2.25
Brazil	3	2	4	4	3.25
Brunei	5	4	5	5	4.75
Bulgaria	3	2	3	2	2.50
Burkina Faso	3	1	1	3	2.00
Burundi	3	3	5	4	3.75
Cambodia	3	3	3	3	3.00
Cameroon	3	3	3	4	3.25
Canada	3	3	3	2	2.75
Cape Verde	3	1	3	2	2.25
Central African Republic	1	1	4	4	2.50
Chad	3	3	4	5	3.75
Chile	2	2	4	2	2.50
China	5	3	5	5	4.50
Colombia	3	2	3	2	2.50
Comoros	4	4	4	5	4.25
Democratic Republic of the Congo	3	5	4	4	4.00
Republic of the Congo	1	1	1	3	1.50
Costa Rica	3	3	3	2	2.75
Ivory Coast	3	3	4	3	3.25
Croatia	3	4	4	2	3.25
Cuba	5	3	4	4	4.00
Cyprus	3	2	0	4	3.00
Czech Republic	3	1	1	1	1.50
Denmark	3	3	3	2	2.75
Djibouti	3	2	4	4	3.25
Dominica	2	3	4	2	2.75
Dominican Republic	3	3	4	3	3.25
Ecuador	1	1	1	2	1.25
Egypt	4	4	5	5	4.50
El Salvador	3	1	4	4	3.00
Equatorial Guinea	3	3	4	4	3.50
Eritrea	4	3	4	5	4.00
Estonia	3	2	4	2	2.75
Ethiopia	3	3	3	4	3.25
Fiji	1	3	4	2	2.50
Finland	3	3	3	3	3.00
France	2	1	1	2	1.50
Gabon	1	1	0	4	2.00
The Gambia	1	2	4	4	2.75
Georgia	3	3	3	2	2.75
Germany	3	3	3	4	3.25
Ghana	3	4	4	2	3.25
Greece	3	2	2	2	2.25
Grenada	2	3	4	4	3.25
Guatemala	3	2	4	3	3.00
Guinea	3	3	4	4	3.50
Guinea-Bissau	1	1	0	3	1.67
Guyana	3	3	4	4	3.50
Haiti	3	3	3	2	2.75
Honduras	3	1	0	4	2.67
Hungary	3	3	5	4	3.75
Iceland	3	1	1	1	1.50
India	3	2	4	4	3.25
Indonesia	5	3	5	5	4.50
Iran	5	4	5	5	4.75
Iraq	4	4	4	5	4.25
Ireland	3	3	3	2	2.75
Israel	4	3	4	4	3.75
Italy	3	3	4	3	3.25
Jamaica	3	3	4	1	2.75
Japan	3	1	3	2	2.25
Jordan	5	3	4	5	4.25
Kazakhstan	3	3	4	4	3.50
Kenya	1	4	2	3	2.50
Kiribati	2	2	3	4	2.75
South Korea	3	1	1	2	1.75
Kosovo	1	3	1	2	1.75
Kuwait	5	3	5	5	4.50
Kyrgyzstan	3	1	4	3	2.75
Laos	2	3	0	4	3.00
Latvia	3	2	4	2	2.75
Lebanon	4	4	4	4	4.00
Lesotho	0	3	0	3	3.00
Liberia	3	3	4	3	3.25
Libya	5	3	4	4	4.00
Liechtenstein	3	3	3	1	2.50
Lithuania	3	3	4	1	2.75
Luxembourg	3	3	1	1	2.00
North Macedonia	3	3	4	2	3.00
Madagascar	3	3	4	3	3.25
Malawi	3	3	3	4	3.25
Malaysia	4	4	5	5	4.50
Maldives	5	4	5	5	4.75
Mali	3	3	4	4	3.50
Malta	3	3	3	2	2.75
Marshall Islands	2	3	3	1	2.25
Mauritania	5	4	5	5	4.75
Mauritius	3	3	3	2	2.75
Mexico	2	3	4	3	3.00
Federated States of Micronesia	2	3	3	1	2.25
Moldova	3	2	4	3	3.00
Monaco	3	2	4	2	2.75
Mongolia	2	1	1	2	1.50
Montenegro	3	1	4	3	2.75
Morocco	4	4	5	5	4.50
Mozambique	3	1	4	3	2.75
Myanmar	3	3	4	5	3.75
Namibia	3	1	1	2	1.75
Nauru	1	1	1	2	1.25
Nepal	3	3	4	4	3.50
Netherlands	1	1	1	1	1.00
New Zealand	3	3	1	1	2.00
Nicaragua	3	3	4	4	3.50
Niger	2	3	2	3	2.50
Nigeria	4	4	4	5	4.25
North Korea	5	5	5	5	5.00
Norway	3	2	1	1	1.75
Oman	4	2	5	5	4.00
Pakistan	5	5	5	5	5.00
Palau	2	3	1	1	1.75
State of Palestine	4	3	4	4	3.75
Panama	3	2	4	2	2.75
Papua New Guinea	3	3	4	4	3.50
Paraguay	3	3	4	3	3.25
Peru	3	3	3	2	2.75
Philippines	3	3	3	4	3.25
Poland	3	3	4	4	3.50
Portugal	3	2	3	3	2.75
Qatar	4	4	5	5	4.50
Romania	3	3	4	1	2.75
Russia	3	1	4	4	3.00
Rwanda	5	3	4	4	4.00
Saint Kitts and Nevis	2	3	1	2	2.00
Saint Lucia	3	3	4	3	3.25
Saint Vincent and the Grenadines	2	2	4	4	3.00
Samoa	3	4	4	4	3.75
San Marino	3	2	1	4	2.50
São Tomé and Príncipe	1	1	1	4	1.75
Saudi Arabia	5	5	5	5	5.00
Senegal	3	3	4	3	3.25
Serbia	3	1	4	3	2.75
Seychelles	3	2	4	4	3.25
Sierra Leone	3	3	3	3	3.00
Singapore	3	3	3	4	3.25
Slovakia	3	1	4	4	3.00
Slovenia	1	1	1	1	1.00
Solomon Islands	3	3	4	4	3.50
Somalia	5	4	4	5	4.50
South Africa	1	1	0	3	1.67
South Sudan	1	0	0	3	2.00
Spain	3	3	3	3	3.00
Sri Lanka	3	4	4	4	3.75
Sudan	5	4	5	5	4.75
Suriname	3	3	4	4	3.50
Eswatini	3	4	4	4	3.75
Sweden	3	1	1	1	1.50
Switzerland	3	3	3	3	3.00
Syria	5	4	4	5	4.50
Taiwan	1	1	1	3	1.50
Tajikistan	3	3	3	4	3.25
Tanzania	4	2	4	4	3.50
Thailand	4	3	4	4	3.75
Timor-Leste	3	1	4	2	2.50
Togo	3	3	4	4	3.50
Tonga	3	2	3	2	2.50
Trinidad and Tobago	2	3	4	4	3.25
Tunisia	4	4	4	4	4.00
Turkey	3	4	4	4	3.75
Turkmenistan	3	3	4	4	3.50
Tuvalu	3	0	3	3	3.00
Uganda	2	3	4	3	3.00
Ukraine	2	2	4	2	2.50
United Arab Emirates	5	4	5	5	4.75
United Kingdom	3	3	3	2	2.75
United States	2	1	3	1	1.75
Uruguay	3	1	3	4	2.75
Uzbekistan	3	3	4	4	3.50
Vanuatu	3	3	4	3	3.25
Venezuela	3	3	1	4	2.75
Vietnam	5	3	4	4	4.00
Yemen	5	4	5	5	4.75
Zambia	3	4	4	4	3.75
Zimbabwe	3	4	4	4	3.75

==== Responses to the Freedom of Thought Report ====
The various annual editions of the Freedom of Thought Report have been covered in the media, including The Independent, Christian Today, and The Washington Post. The report has also received coverage in national media in countries discussed in the report, including the Malay Mail in Malaysia.

Forewords and prefaces to the report have been written by a range of public figures, including United Nations Special Rapporteurs on Freedom of Religion or Belief; the report's foreword page includes excerpts from multiple annual editions. In his foreword to the first edition, Heiner Bielefeldt emphasised that international protections for freedom of religion or belief also apply to non-religious people and their convictions.

In the UK Parliament in October 2013, David Lidington responded to a question on the report by stating that UK policy on freedom of religion or belief is consistent with protecting the rights of individuals (rather than protecting beliefs themselves), and highlighted protecting freedom of expression online as a priority.

== See also ==
- List of freedom indices
- Freedom in the World
- World Press Freedom Index
- The Economist Democracy Index
- V-Dem Democracy Indices
- Corruption Perceptions Index
- Index of Economic Freedom
