= Global Rights Index =

Assessment by the International Trade Union Confederation

The Global Rights Index (GRI) is a world-wide assessment of trade union and human rights by country. Updated annually in a report issued by the International Trade Union Confederation, the index rates countries on a scale from 1 (best) through to 5+ (worst). Ratings are based on 97 indicators derived from the labour standards of the International Labour Organization. The annual index reports on violations of trade union rights, such as limitations on collective bargaining and the right to strike, inhibiting trade union membership, state surveillance, violence and killings against trade unionists and restrictions on freedom of speech.

== Ratings ==
The ITUC debuted the index in 2014. It uses the following rating system to indicate the extent of trade union rights violations:

Rating	Meaning
5+	No guarantee of rights due to the breakdown of the rule of law
5	No guarantee of rights
4	Systematic violations of rights
3	Regular violations of rights
2	Repeated violations of rights
1	Sporadic violations of rights

== 2023 rankings ==
According to data collected from 2023 across 149 countries, in terms of violations of trade union rights, the ITUC rated the following as the worst for working people:

- Bangladesh
- Belarus
- Ecuador
- Egypt
- Eswatini
- Guatemala
- Myanmar
- The Philippines
- Tunisia
- Türkiye

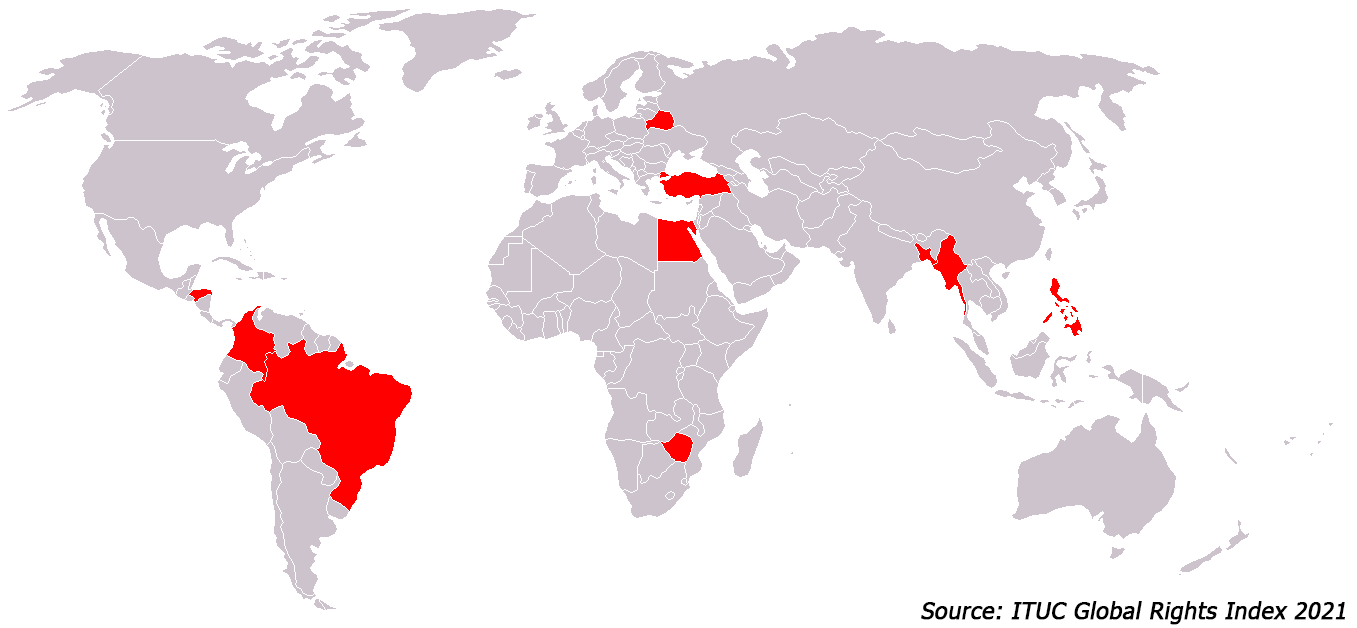
10 worst countries for workers in 2021

== 2025 Report ==
The 2025 index is the 12th Index the ITUC has created. In the report, it surveyed 151 countries and noted that, "In 2025, average country ratings deteriorated in three out of five global regions, with Europe and the Americas recording their worst scores since the Index’s inception in 2014." The report, reported that the worst region for rights in the world was the Middle East and North Africa.

=== Highlights from the report ===
In 2025, the report noted that Argentina, Costa Rica, Georgia, Italy, Mauritania, Niger, and Panama recorded a worse rating than in 2024. However, Australia, Mexico and Oman improved on their rating.

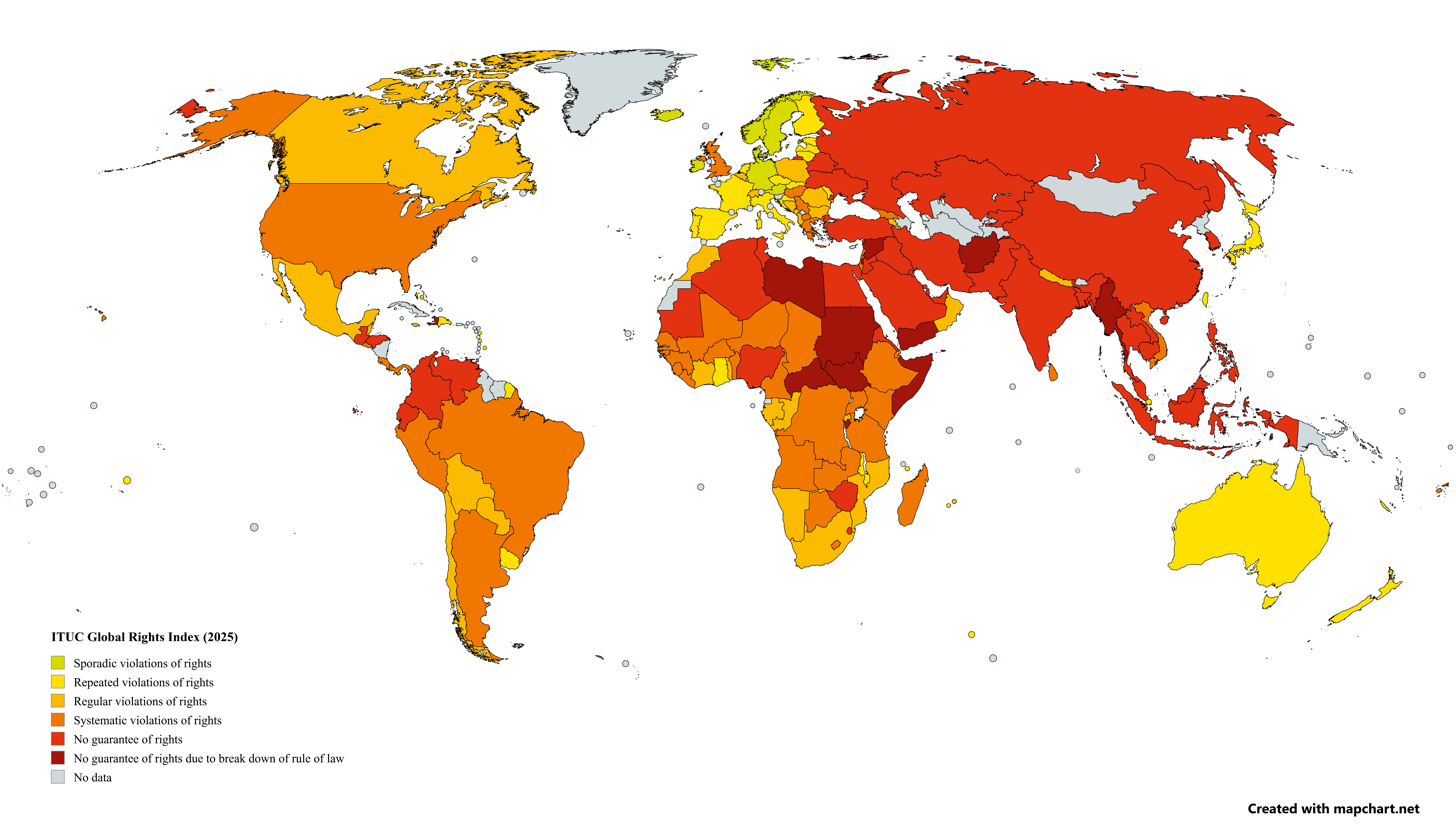
Map categorising global rights according to the ITUC in 2025

==== Top ten worst countries for working people ====
1. Bangladesh
2. Belarus
3. Ecuador
4. Egypt
5. Eswatini
6. Myanmar
7. Nigeria
8. The Philippines
9. Tunisia
10. Türkiye

==== Statistics of worker's rights violations ====
- 87% of countries violated the right to strike
- 80% of countries violated the right to collective bargaining
- 75% of countries excluded workers from the right to establish or join a trade union
- 72% of countries gave workers restricted or no access to justice.
- 74% of countries impeded the registration of unions
- 45% of countries restricted free speech and assembly
