= African Growth and Opportunity Act =

U.S. legislation approved by Congress in 2000

- Other short titles: United States-Caribbean Basin Trade Partnership Act
- Long title: An Act to authorize a new trade and investment policy for sub-Saharan Africa, expand trade benefits to the countries in the Caribbean Basin, renew the generalized system of preferences, and reauthorize the trade adjustment assistance programs.
- Acronyms (colloquial): AGOA
- Nicknames: Trade and Development Act of 2000
- Enacted by: the 106th United States Congress
- Effective: May 18, 2000

Citations
- Public law: 106-200
- Statutes at Large: 114 Stat. 251

Codification
- Titles amended: 19 U.S.C.: Customs Duties
- U.S.C. sections created: 19 U.S.C. ch. 23 § 3701 et seq.

Legislative history
- Introduced in the House as H.R. 434 by Phil Crane (R–IL) on February 2, 1999; Committee consideration by House International Relations, House Ways and Means, House Banking and Financial Services; Passed the House on July 16, 1999 (234-163, Roll call vote 307, via Clerk.House.gov); Passed the Senate on November 3, 1999 (76-19, Roll call vote 353, via Senate.gov); Reported by the joint conference committee on May 4, 2000; agreed to by the House on May 4, 2000 (309-110, Roll call vote 145, via Clerk.House.gov) and by the Senate on May 11, 2000 (77-19, Roll call vote 98, via Senate.gov); Signed into law by President Bill Clinton on May 18, 2000

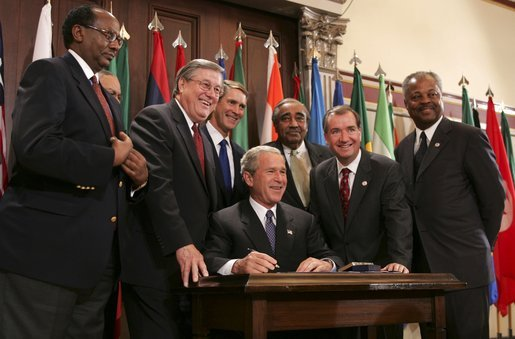
President George W. Bush signs into law the African Growth and Opportunity Act (AGOA) of 2004 in the Dwight D. Eisenhower Executive Office Building Tuesday, July 13, 2004.

The African Growth and Opportunity Act or AGOA (Title I, Trade and Development Act of 2000; P.L. 106–200) is a piece of legislation that was approved by the U.S. Congress in May 2000. The stated purpose of this legislation is to assist the economies of sub-Saharan Africa and to improve economic relations between the United States and the region. After completing its initial 15-year period of validity, during which 13 countries had become ineligible, AGOA was extended on 29 June 2015 by a further 10 years, to 2025. AGOA expired on 30 September 2025, however, in February 2026 Congress reauthorized it for another year. As of November 2026, thirty countries were eligible and 19 were ineligible.

== History ==
The African Growth and Opportunity Act (AGOA) was the idea of Congressman Jim McDermott, a former Foreign Service medical officer based in Zaire, and his chief of staff, Michael Williams. McDermott, along with Congressman Ed Royce, helped move the earliest versions of the legislation through US Congress. Later Rosa Whitaker, who served as the first ever Assistant U.S. Trade Representative (USTR) for Africa in the administrations of Presidents William J. Clinton and George W. Bush, helped develop and implement the law.

Passage of the legislation followed nearly a decade of leadership on the part of U.S. activists such as Paul Speck at Environmental and Energy Institute, Witney Schneidman, Steve Lande, Mel Foote, Tony Carroll, Claude Fontheim, and Mark Neuman, and others. AGOA was signed by President Clinton into law in May 2000.

In 2008 African trade to the US peaked and has subsequently decreased. After the 2008 financial crisis trade plummeted. The U.S. Export Import Bank aggressively promoted U.S. trade with the region, and between 2009 and 2011 transactions increased from $412 million to $1,392 billion.

The legislation was reviewed again in 2015, was extended for 10 years following contentious debate. The revisions made it easier to become eligible and focused on improving the future business environment in developing African countries. As of 2018 the AGOA forum had been held four times in Washington, and once each in Mauritius, Senegal, Ghana, Kenya, Zambia (2011), Ethiopia (2013), Gabon (2015) and Togo (2017).

The scheduled expiration in 2025 made the future of U.S.–Africa relations uncertain. In part, this was due to a changing trade environment with respect to Africa; for example, intracontinental and intercontinental economic integration had increased significantly. Similarly, following the conclusion of economic partnership agreements between the European Union and African, Caribbean, and Pacific (ACP) countries, trade ties have been shifting from unilateral preferences to reciprocal relations. In order for African producers and manufacturers to become more fully integrated into supply chain networks, it was suggested to consider restructuring U.S.–Africa economic relations outside of the AGOA. The United States and sub-Saharan African countries had already discussed potential post-AGOA policy architectures in 2020.

== Content and goals ==
The legislation authorized the president of the United States to determine which sub-Saharan African countries would be eligible for AGOA on an annual basis. The eligibility criteria were aimed at improving labor rights and development toward a market-based economy. An AGOA eligible country has duty-free access to the U.S.market. This can be especially beneficial for labour-intensive African economy sectors such as textile manufacturing. AGOA eligibility does not imply automatic eligibility for a "Wearing Apparel" provision to export apparel and certain textiles to the United States, because an eligible country must have implemented a "Visa System" that satisfies American authorities and proves compliance with the AGOA Rules of Origin. AGOA has directed Overseas Private Investment Corporation "to create an equity fund for infrastructure and a fund to support women entrepreneurs" and at the same time OPIC is not allowed to support projects in textiles and apparel and agribusiness, because of feared competition.

Every year an AGOA Forum is held, which brings together government leaders and private sector stakeholders from Africa and the United States. The forum is held in Washington in even years, and in an AGOA eligible African country in odd years.

== Results ==
During the first decade of the law, 89 percent of sub-Saharan exports were petroleum-related, and had "not created large numbers of new jobs". Agricultulture and agro-processing have not played a central role either.

== Eligibility and fluctuations to date ==
A country can "graduate" from AGOA and thereby loses eligibility, if it becomes a "high-income" country as defined by the World Bank. This has happened only to one of the 50 countries.

Countries' inclusion has fluctuated with changes in the local political environment. In December 2009, for example, Guinea, Madagascar, and Niger were all removed from the list of eligible countries; by October 2011, though, eligibility was restored to Guinea and Niger, and by June 2014, to Madagascar as well. Notice was given that Burundi would lose its AGOA eligibility status as of 1 January 2016. In August, 2017, Togo was recognized as an eligible country. In 2018, Rwanda was removed when it opposed second hand clothing imports from the US.

On January 1, 2022, the United States removed Ethiopia, Mali and Guinea from the AGOA programme over alleged human rights violations and recent coups. In a statement the US Trade Representative (USTR) explained the removal was “due to actions taken by each of their governments in violation of the AGOA Statute”. Burkina Faso lost its eligibility in 2023 due to successful coups in January and September. As of January 1, 2023, 35 countries were eligible to participate in AGOA. According to the 2024 USTR report on AGOA, 32 countries were eligible for AGOA that year.

In November 2023, President Joe Biden urged for the removal of Gabon, Uganda, Niger, and the Central African Republic from AGOA, citing human rights violations.

In November 2026, President Donald Trump notified Congress that his administration would remove Rwanda and South Africa from AGOA by the start of 2027, citing corruption and barriers to trade and investment. The second Trump administration announced it was to "terminate" South Africa and Rwanda from AGOA because they violated AGOA rules. For Rwanda it cited "trade and investment barriers, rule of law, political pluralism, internationally recognized worker rights, human rights, and threats to U.S. national security and foreign policy interests" as reasons.

=== Status ===
As of November 2026, thirty countries were eligible. Of the 19 ineligible countries, 3 countries never requested eligibility to date and 12 had become ineligible since 2016.

Eligibility status as of November 2, 2026
Country	Currently eligible	Notes on suspension
Angola	Yes	
Benin	Yes	
Botswana	Yes	
Burkina Faso	No	Suspended on January 1, 2023 following coups d'état in January and September.
Burundi	No	Suspended on January 1, 2016, following the Nkurunziza re-election controversy
(Cape Verde) Cabo Verde	Yes	
Cameroon	No	Suspended on January 1, 2020, for human rights abuses
Central African Republic	No	Suspended on January 1, 2024 for human rights abuses.
Chad	Yes	
Comoros	Yes	
Republic of the Congo	Yes	
Democratic Republic of the Congo	Yes	
(Ivory Coast) Côte d'Ivoire	Yes	
Djibouti	Yes	
Equatorial Guinea	No	Graduated AGOA on January 1, 2011
Eritrea	No	
Eswatini	Yes	
Ethiopia	No	Suspended on January 1, 2022, over concerns of human rights violations in the Tigray War
Gabon	Yes	Suspended on January 1, 2024 for abuses in human rights in Gabon, reinstated 2026 after "progress on governance"
The Gambia	Yes	
Ghana	Yes	
Guinea	No	Suspended on January 1, 2022, following the 2021 Guinean coup d'état
Guinea-Bissau	Yes	
Kenya	Yes	
Lesotho	Yes	
Liberia	Yes	
Madagascar	Yes	
Malawi	Yes	
Mali	No	Suspended on January 1, 2022, following the 2021 Malian coup d'état
Mauritania	No	Suspended on January 1, 2019, over a failure to address forced labor
Mauritius	Yes	
Mozambique	Yes	
Namibia	Yes	
Niger	No	Suspended on January 1, 2024 for human rights abuses.
Nigeria	Yes	
Rwanda	No	AGOA apparel benefits suspended on July 31, 2018, in response to the banning of second-hand clothing imports Suspension for 2027 announced in November 2026.
São Tomé and Príncipe	Yes	
Senegal	Yes	
Seychelles	No	Graduated AGOA on January 1, 2017
Sierra Leone	Yes	
Somalia	No	Has never requested designation as an AGOA beneficiary country
South Africa	No	Suspension for 2027 announced in November 2026.
South Sudan	No	Suspended on January 1, 2015
Sudan	No	Has never requested designation as an AGOA beneficiary country
Tanzania	Yes	
Togo	Yes	
Uganda	No	Suspended on January 1, 2024 for human rights abuses, including the Anti-Homosexuality Act of 2023.
Zambia	Yes	
Zimbabwe	No	Has never been eligible for membership since the founding of AGOA

== Benefits and results ==
AGOA provides trade preferences for quota and duty-free entry into the United States for certain goods, expanding the benefits under the Generalized System of Preferences (GSP) program. Notably, AGOA expanded market access for textile and apparel goods into the United States for eligible countries, though a number of other goods are also included. This resulted in the growth of an apparel industry in southern Africa, and created hundreds of thousands of jobs. However, the dismantling of the Multi Fibre Agreement's world quota regime for textile and apparel trade in January 2005 reversed some of the gains made in the African textile industry due to increased competition from developing nations outside of Africa, particularly China. Some factories shut down in Lesotho, where most of the growth occurred. Orders from African manufacturers stabilised somewhat after the imposition of certain safeguard measures by US authorities, but Africa's share of the US market was still reduced after the phaseout.

AGOA has resulted in limited successes in some countries. In addition to growth in the textile and apparel industry, some AGOA countries have begun to export new products to the United States, such as cut flowers, horticultural products, automotive components and steel. While Nigeria and Angola are the largest exporters under AGOA, other countries, particularly South Africa's have been more diverse and unlike the former are not mainly concentrated in the energy sector. To some countries, including Lesotho, Eswatini, Kenya and Madagascar, AGOA remains of critical importance. Agricultural products are a promising area for AGOA trade; however much work needs to be done to assist African countries in meeting U.S. sanitary and phytosanitary standards. The US government is providing technical assistance to AGOA eligible countries to help them benefit from the legislation, through the US Agency for International Development (USAID) and other agencies. The US government has established three regional trade hubs in Africa for this purpose, in Accra, Ghana; Gaborone, Botswana; and Nairobi, Kenya.

Statistics suggest a positive balance of trade for AGOA participant countries. In FY2008, for example, the United States exported $17,125,389 in goods to the 41 AGOA countries, and imported $81,426,951 for a balance of $64,301,562 in favor of the AGOA countries.

== Reception ==
Cameroonian scholar Tatah Mentan has criticized AGOA, arguing that while the legislation "sounds like a benevolent multilateral trade agreement", it is actually a neo-colonial scheme to further exploit African resources. Mentan has argued that despite promises of economic growth, the profits made from the scheme are "not for Africans". Sociologist Michael Mann has argued the legislation "exacts indirect imperial tribute" from African states, noting AGOA contains a clause requiring participating African countries not to oppose American foreign policy.

Some allege that AGOA is in contradiction with WTO rules. Furthermore, it is seen as a one-sided agreement as there was little African involvement in its preparation. AGOA has also been criticized for being "dominated by oil and raw materials" After the enactment of AGOA, "exports have increased by more than 500 per cent from around $8.2 billion then to $54 billion in 2011, although about 90 per cent of these are natural resources, mainly oil," wrote Andualem Sisay.
