= Human trafficking in Saint Vincent and the Grenadines =

In 2010 St. Vincent and the Grenadines was a source country for some children subjected to trafficking in persons, specifically for the purpose of sexual exploitation within the country; it may also have been a destination country for women in forced prostitution and men in forced labour. Reports suggested that Vincentian children may have participated in commercial sexual exploitation to supplement their families’ income. In these situations, parents, relatives, or other care-givers receive in-kind or financial compensation or other benefited from a child engaging in sexual activities. Reports suggested the number of victims trafficked in, to, or through St. Vincent and the Grenadines was comparatively small. Information on the extent of human trafficking in St. Vincent and the Grenadines, however, was lacking, as the government conducted no related investigations, studies, or surveys.

According to the United States Trafficking in Persons Report 2024, the Government of St. Vincent and the Grenadines remains on Tier 2 for trafficking in persons. The report noted ongoing efforts to combat trafficking, including increased investigations, labour inspections, training for officials, and public awareness campaigns, but also highlighted persistent shortcomings such as a lack of prosecutions or convictions of traffickers and weak victim identification and services.

The country ratified the 2000 UN TIP Protocol in October 2010.

The Government of St. Vincent and the Grenadines does not fully comply with the minimum standards for the elimination of trafficking; however, it is making significant efforts to do so. Despite these efforts, including the government’s public commitment to addressing human trafficking, the government did not provide evidence of law enforcement efforts to combat trafficking by investigating reports of the commercial sexual exploitation of children and of women who may be forced to engage in prostitution, nor did it provide more than minimal protection to victims or suspected victims or make any effort to prevent human trafficking during the year. U.S. State Department's Office to Monitor and Combat Trafficking in Persons placed the country in "Tier 2" in 2017 and in 2023.

== Prosecution (2009) ==
The Government of St. Vincent and the Grenadines made minimal progress in anti-trafficking law enforcement efforts over the last year. The government has no specific or comprehensive laws prohibiting trafficking in persons, although slavery and forced labor are both constitutionally prohibited. Trafficking offenders could be prosecuted under relevant provisions in immigration, prostitution, or labor laws, though there were no such efforts reported over the last year. Sufficiently stringent penalties for trafficking offenders under these laws range from 10–15 years’ imprisonment and are commensurate with penalties prescribed for other serious offenses. Law enforcement authorities showed no signs of proactively investigating or prosecuting suspected trafficking offenses under existing trafficking-related provisions in prostitution or labor laws. The government did not provide specialized training for law enforcement or other government officials in how to recognize, investigate, and prosecute instances of trafficking or trafficking victim identification. In November 2009, officials attended information seminars on regional trafficking issues. Twenty-five officials attended two days of workshops conducted by the International Organization for Migration and an expert in trafficking law in March 2010. The government received reports of two suspected trafficking cases during the past year, one involving foreign women who may have been victims of sex trafficking and one involving boys who claimed to have been victims of labor trafficking. In October 2009, immigration officers noted some potential female trafficking victims in a group attempting to transit St. Vincent and the Grenadines, began investigating their situation, and requested outside assistance to further their investigations. Officers were, however, required by law to deport the women before they could complete their inquiries either internally or with the governments of neighboring countries. In the other case, police detained a number of teenage boys during a drug raid who claimed they were subjected to forced labor by criminals involved in the production and sale of illegal drugs. Local prosecutors and police investigated the claims and determined the juveniles fabricated the allegations to escape prosecution for the drug-related offenses.

== Protection (2009) ==
The Vincentian government did not show tangible progress in ensuring that victims of trafficking are identified and provided access to necessary services. The Ministry of Mobilization and Social Development, however, developed a referral process to transfer victims detained, arrested, or placed in protective custody by law enforcement authorities to institutions that provide short- or long-term care. The St. Vincent and the Grenadines Human Rights Association provided legal services and other limited aid to victims of any crime, and did not knowingly assist any victims of trafficking during the year. The government provided some funding and building space to three local NGO's whose shelter, counseling, and other services for all crime victims would also be available to trafficking victims. Government officials have no formal procedure for proactively identifying victims of trafficking for the purposes of forced labor or commercial sexual exploitation, but on the two occasions noted above individual law enforcement officials suspected trafficking may have occurred in conjunction with other suspicious activities. Under current laws, the government did not encourage victims’ assistance in the investigation and prosecution of trafficking or other crimes, nor did it provide legal alternatives to the removal of foreign victims to countries where they would face hardship or retribution. St. Vincent and the Grenadines had no law or official procedures in place to ensure that victims would not be inappropriately incarcerated, fined, or otherwise penalized for unlawful offenses committed solely as a direct result of being trafficked.

== Prevention (2009) ==
The government made minimal efforts to prevent trafficking and to increase the public’s awareness of the dangers of human trafficking in St. Vincent and the Grenadines. In 2009, the Prime Minister made the first-ever address to parliament on trafficking issues. The government did not conduct anti-trafficking information or education campaigns during the reporting period. It did not develop an anti-trafficking national plan of action, and did not establish an anti-trafficking working group. A foreign donor provided funds for the government to consult with a legal expert on drafting comprehensive anti-trafficking legislation that would be appropriate within the context of the country’s existing legal structure and in accordance with international agreements and standards. The consultant also provided two days of workshops on trafficking awareness and an anti-trafficking legislative structure. The government made no efforts to reduce the demand for commercial sex acts.

== See also ==
- Human rights in Saint Vincent and the Grenadines
