= Human rights in Costa Rica =

Costa Rica is often considered one of the best countries in Latin America at upholding Human Rights. It has been involved in the creation of international rights standards. Costa Rica is signatory to, and has ratified, many international treaties regarding rights, including the 1948 United Nations Declaration on Human Rights (UNDHR). Costa Rica scored above the world mean for human rights, achieving top global rankings. Its poverty levels sit at 18.6%, one of the lowest in the Latin American regions. Human rights in Costa Rica predominantly stem from the UNDHR, the Costa Rican Constitution and the Inter-American Human Rights System.

Women's, children's and refugee's rights are all upheld in Costa Rica. LGBT rights have improved substantially over recent years, for instance with the legalization of same-sex-marriage in 2020.

== Sources of human rights ==
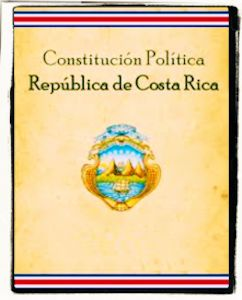
Constitution of Costa Rica

=== Constitution of Costa Rica ===
The Constitution of Costa Rica was established in 1949. It is composed of 177 Articles denoting the rules and principles to which Costa Ricans must comply, whilst also outlining their rights. Prior to 1989, violations of the constitution were rarely acted upon by courts. This changed with the creation of the Constitutional Court (Sala IV) in 1989. The court's main role is the protection of constitutional rights.

=== International Human Rights ===
Costa Rica has signed and ratified many international conventions, declarations and treaties regarding human rights. Conventions are legally binding, whilst declarations and treaties entail a moral standard of behaviour, however, declarations often obtain the status of international customary law over time.

Some of the international agreements Costa Rica has ratified include:

- The Universal Declaration of Human Rights
- International Covenant on Civil and Political Rights
- International Covenant on Economic, Social and Cultural Rights
- Convention Against Torture and Other Cruel, Inhuman or Degrading Treatment
- Convention on the Rights of the Child
- Convention on the Elimination of all Forms of Discrimination Against Women
- American Convention on Human Rights “Pact of San Jose, Costa Rica”

=== Inter-American Human Rights System ===
In 1959 the Inter-American Human Rights System was established in response to human rights violations in Latin America. The system is composed of the Inter-American Commission on Human Rights and the Inter-American Court of Human Rights. The court was established after the commission, in operation since 1979. Instances of human rights violations can be reported to both bodies. Emergency measures can also be put in place by the two bodies for those at immediate, substantial risk of harm. The purpose of the system it to reduce the extent of human rights violations within Latin America. Decisions made by the system are binding.

The Inter-American Commission of Human Rights was established by the 35 member states of the Organisation of American States (OAS). It is composed of non-partisan legal experts. Its main functions are the monitoring of human rights conditions, receiving complaints of violations and visiting the countries and areas where said reports occur. The commission also carries out promotion activities, including the publishing of human rights reports accessible to the public and education programmes.

Currently, 20 member states of the OAS states have accepted The Inter-American Court of Human Rights jurisdiction. There are seven independent judges in the court, elected through the OAS General Assembly. They decide on cases of human rights violations. Only cases brought against member states of the OAS can be put in front of the court. The case must be referred to the court by a state which is a member of both the OAS and the Inter-American Commission of human rights.

== Key areas ==
=== Women's rights ===
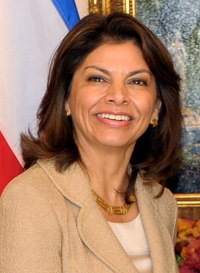
Laura Chinchilla Miranda, the first female president of Costa Rica

It is currently illegal to discriminate against women in Costa Rica, the country historically placing large emphasis on promoting gender equality; the constitution pledges equal rights. Power disparity does still exist, yet has significantly lessened in recent years. Costa Rica ranks third in the developing nations for gender equality. Marriage is usually consensual, on the basis on love, with divorces legal and usually favouring women in terms of division of assets and custody of children.

Free, compulsory primary and secondary education is provided to all women in Costa Rica. Both private and public higher university education is also accessible. Literacy rates between men and women sit equal at 96%. Due to greater access to education, alongside economic necessity, women now constitute approximately 36% of the labour force, predominantly in manufacturing industries. Female participation in business and science industries still remains low, despite women now being able to manage and own assets, such as wealth and properties. Wage disparity persists, men earning, on average, 23.6% more for the same job.

Costa Rica has one of the highest levels of female political representation globally. Women hold approximately 34% of national seats in parliament and 47% of municipal seats. The first female president was Laura Chinchilla Miranda in 2010. Women currently hold both the first and second vice presidency positions. The right of women to vote was gained in 1948 with the creation of the constitution.

Pre and post-natal care has been reported as exceptional in Costa Rica, both mother and infant mortality rates low comparative to the rest of the world. Contraception is condoned, 80% of women over 18 using some form. Abortion, however, is a criminal offence, except for in cases when the mother's life is at risk. In Vitro fertilisation was banned in 2000 by the Costa Rican Constitutional Court as it was believed to violate the “inviolability of life” under the constitution, undermining the right of the embryo to life. This was overturned in 2012 by the Inter-American Court of Human Rights which declared the ban violated the human right to privacy, to form a family and to reproductive autonomy. A debate thus ensued between the importance of human reproductive rights versus the right of the embryo. Ultimately, Costa Rica lifted the ban, with severe restrictions.

=== Refugee rights ===
Costa Rica has historically been notable in its protection and implementation of refugee rights, in accordance with its duty to the UN 1967 protocol on refugees, its intake high. This protocol necessitates the commitment of states to the intake of refugees fleeing political repression, under article 14 of the UNDHR and as outlined in the 1951 Refugee Convention; Costa Rica is signatory to conventions regarding refugee rights. Costa Rica also takes part in the International Conference on Central American Refugees. Costa Rica's refugee policies have been characteristically open and accepting, although this has decreased in recent years

In 1979 over 150,000 refugees fled to Costa Rica, predominantly from Nicaragua, with smaller numbers arriving from El Salvador, Guatemala, Honduras and Panama, mainly fleeing political repression. This influx continued throughout the 1980s. Most notably, Costa Rica has upheld refugee's right to work, denoted in international law. This decreased to some degree by the influx of undocumented migrants, commonly referred to as “aliens”; negative stigma around refugees rose, partly due to a rise in crime and a reduction in the level of jobs available to Costa Ricans. As a result, restriction on work arose, such as Article 13 of the Labor Code of Costa Rica which states that any work force must be 90% Costa Rican. The right of a refugee to work decreased. Illegal immigrants often have greater access to employment than refugees.

Primary health care services were, and remain, accessible for refugees, upholding their human right to health. This is because documentation is not required under the Ministry of Health. This accessible health care partly stems from the fear that refugees bring diseases which will impact Costa Ricans if not treated. Education is also provided to refugees due to it being a human right, as well as the positive externality it has on Costa Rican society.

The influx of illegal immigrants over the past decades caused refugee rights to fall as negative stigma rose. As a result, Costa Rica has moved from being characteristically open and welcoming to refugees, to a society resistant to their presence.

Legislative changes in November 2022 under President Rodrigo Chaves have introduced new challenges. A decree forming the country's refugee regulations now imposes significant barriers to work for asylum seekers, including prohibiting self-employment and requiring a job offer for work permit issuance. These measures mark a significant shift from previous laws that facilitated easier integration of refugees and asylum seekers into the labor market.

This recent legislation has sparked concerns about its impact on Costa Rica's ability to effectively respond to the refugee crisis, potentially undermining its long history of progressive refugee policies and affecting the rights and welfare of asylum seekers within its borders.

=== LGBT rights ===
Advances in LGBT rights in the past few decades in Costa Rica have been met with significant contention. Whilst homosexuality was decriminalised in the 19th Century, discrimination against homosexuals, a legal practice, remains prevalent. This can in part be attributed to the continued influence of the Roman Catholic Church in Costa Rica, citizens more socially conservative.

Historically, LGBT rights have been negligible. Police harassment and raids on LGBT people in both public and private properties were frequent. Discrimination in the professional sphere was also prominent, many being fired or abused for their sexual identity. AIDS healthcare remains minimal due to surrounding stigma. This is reinforced by the 1999 national opinion poll which found 80% of Costa Ricans who responded believed homosexuality was “never justifiable”.

In 1990 Government Minister Desanti placed a ban on foreign women travelling alone, with short hair or wearing pants, from entering Costa Rica, in case they were there to participate in a national meeting of Lesbians, known as “Encuentro”; it was not until the late 1990s that the Costa Rican Supreme Court ruled that the right of LGBT people to peaceful assembly was outlined in the constitution.

Other examples of discrimination include Luis Fishman banning individuals identifying as LGBT as serving on the police force in 1993. In the late 1990s LGBT tourists to Costa Rica were labelled as predatory sex tourists who were not welcome in the country by Eduardo Leon-Paez. In 2007, Mario Nunez proposed a bill to ban LGBT people and same-sex couples from having custody of children. The bill did not pass. In 2008, the Supreme Court prohibited gay individuals from visiting their spouses in prison, the ruling reversed in 2011. The first LGBT pride march took place in 2004, met with much resistance.

Despite this resistance, since 2010 there has been significant improvements in LGBT rights, largely facilitated by lawyer Yashin Castrillo in 2013 when he was prohibited from marrying his partner. Castrillo contested this greatly, bringing the issue into the limelight, predominantly through his claims that the Family Codes, which prevent same-sex couples from marrying, violate Articles 28, 33 and 39 of the Costa Rican Constitution. However, when put to the Constitutional Court in 2006, Sala IV maintained the prohibition. In 2010, the LGBT community gained political representation with the election of federal deputy Carmen Munoz, facilitating the improvement of legal LGBT rights. In 2018, Costa Rica's Supreme Court ruled that the ban on same-sex marriage violated the rights of LGBT individuals, being discriminatory and unconstitutional. As a result, gay marriage became legal on 26 May 2020. This legalisation may also be attributed to the IACHR stance, exposed in 2016, which placed emphasis on the importance of LGBT rights, particularly marriage rights.

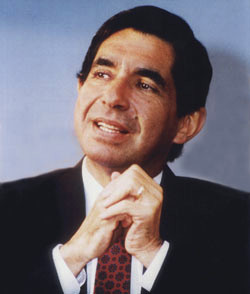
Oscar Arias Sanchez, president of Costa Rica from 1986-1990 and 2006-2010

=== Children's rights ===
Costa Rica ratified the United Nations Convention on the Rights of the Child (UNCRC) on August 21, 1990, meaning it is legally obliged to uphold the articles it entails. Costa Rica's president in 2009, Oscar Arias Sanchez, stated this convention ‘changed generations’, seeing large children rights improvements across the county. The most important elements within this convention are the child's inalienable right to life, freedom of self-expression, respect of their opinions and non-discrimination on any physical or mental basis. The improvements witnessed in Costa Rica have predominantly been in the areas of health, education, non-discrimination and respect.

Further improvements have been made since the development of the Public Policy for Children and Adolescence 2009–2021 in 2009. This Policy was created on the National Day of Children by President Sanchez, his ministers, the National Council on Children and Child Welfare Services, with assistant from a large group of children. The policy aims to reiterate the UNCRC to further guarantee and achieve all of the rights of the child, focussing on vulnerable and excluded groups which require extra, specific protection and assistance.

== See also ==
- LGBT rights in Costa Rica
- Human rights in Nicaragua
- Human rights in Panama
