= Human rights in Suriname =

Flag of Suriname

Human rights in Suriname are currently recognised under the Constitution of the Republic of Suriname of 1987. Suriname is a constitutional democracy with a president elected by the unicameral National Assembly. The National Assembly underwent elections in 2025, electing Jennifer Geerlings-Simons as president. The National Assembly has a commission pertaining to issues regarding the country's human rights. The Human Rights Office of the Ministry of Justice and Police is responsible for advising the government on regional and international proceedings against the state concerning human rights. Human rights in Suriname is periodically reviewed by the United Nations Human Rights Committee (UNHRC), on which it is often believed the level of human rights do not yet meet international standards.

Suriname currently continues to face various human rights issues, from the beginning of the country's history with Surinam's Maroons who are part of the population of African descent, to more modern day issues such as corruption, human trafficking, abuse and violence against women and children, child labour, and criminal defamation laws.

== Freedom of the press ==
The constitution provides for freedom of expression, including freedom of the press. Whilst there are no formal restrictions on the press, actions undertaken by the government and non-government actors overrule the ability that of the independent media to continue their work.

Journalists, of those within the industry, have continuously reported intimidation by government and nongovernmental actors. Media outlets in Suriname have now begun intermittently running articles with only the Initials of the journalists, as opposed to their full names. Some have been chosen to leave pieces anonymous to protect the integrity and identity of the writers. Journalists in Suriname are generally provided a minimal to low wage, making them vulnerable to bias and influence, further jeopardising the credibility of reporting.

On the other hand, the government's media office and those in the private sector, tend to hire private journalists removed from independent media outlets and offer them higher wages. This practice creates difficulty for independent media outlets to retain qualified staff and impede upon their ability to report adequately on governmental activities.

== Political rights ==
Universal suffrage was introduced in 1948, allowing Surinamese citizens over the age of 18 to vote. Suriname legislation provides citizens the ability to choose their government in free and fair periodic elections held by secret ballot and based on universal and equal suffrage. The constitution provides for direct election of the 51-member national assembly no later than five years after the prior election date. The National Assembly in turn elects the president by a two-thirds majority vote. The National Assembly underwent elections in 2025, electing Jennifer Geerlings-Simons as president in 2020. Observers from the Organization of American States and the Union of South American States judged that the 2015 elections were well organised and generally free and fair.

Allegations of corruption by the government have remained prevalent as the economy has grown. Allegations surrounded government contracting to political party insiders and supports and transparency of government decisions to issue mineral and timber concession rights. Widespread perception holds that officials use public power for private gain. Civil society, media and other non-governmental parties particularly scrutinise and criticise the Ministries of Public Works, Social Affairs, Public Health, Finance, Regional Development, and Physical Planning, alleging widespread corruption and favouritism.

== Children's rights ==
=== Birth registration ===
The Civil Registry requires all births to be registered within one week. Failure of registration within the mandated period results in more length process of registration. Offspring are permitted citizenship if at least of the birth parents falls under the Suriname "Citizenship and Residency Law".

=== Child abuse ===
In 2017, police registered 35 counts of physical abuse and 212 cases of child sexual abuse, and in 2018, 47 and 256 cases respectfully. Experts believe in actuality that the actual number of abuse cases are significantly higher than that reported. Official arrangements allowing victims to testify in special chambers at legal proceedings has been implemented to avoid intimidation by perpetrators. The Suriname government authorities operate a phone hotline for children requiring confidential advice and aid, servicing an average of to 80 calls daily.

The Suriname Youth Affairs Office actively promotes the awareness of sexual abuse, drugs and alcohol through a weekly television program. The Ministry of Justice and Police operate three child protection centers around the country.

=== Child labour ===
Some forms of child labour are still legal and practiced throughout Suriname. Historically, child labour occurred in agriculture, logging, fisheries, mining and the construction industries, as well as street vending. The legal minimum age for most types of employment was 14, and working hours for minors under 14 are restricted to day shifts only, and only under family-owned businesses, small-scale agriculture or special vocational work. Children under the age of 15 were not permitted to work on boats. Children under the age of 18 are by law prohibited to partake in hazardous work; defined as work that can be endangering to life, health and decency.

In 2018, the Suriname government made advancements to alleviate practices of child labour through International Labour Organisation Convention 138 concerning the minimum age for admission to employment; raising the minimum age of work to 16. Laws and regulations surrounding child labour in Suriname are yet to meet international standards. With Article 20 of the Law on Basic Education requiring children to attend school until they are at least 12 not meeting the minimum age for employment of 16, many children are left vulnerable to labour exploitation. A 2017 United Nations Educational, Scientific and Cultural Organisation (UNESCO) report on Surinamese Children's work and education showed that 6.4% (approximately 6,671) of children aged 5 to 14 worked, with 6.6% of children aged 7 to 14 combining both work and school. Suriname's net attendance ratio for primary school showed 96% and secondary school showing 53%.

== Women's rights ==
The law provides for protection of women's rights to equal access to education, employment and property. In July 2014, Suriname's National Assembly passed the Draft Law on Nationality and Residency, amending law number 4, giving women the same right as men to confer their nationality to their spouses and introduces important safeguards to prevent statelessness due to loss of nationality. In August 2018, the National Assembly passed labour legislation protecting pregnant women from being fired. Nonetheless, women still continuously experience discrimination in various facets, including access and consideration in employment, and in rates of pay for equal or like-for-like work.

=== Rape and domestic violence ===
The law criminalises the rape of men and women, inclusive of spousal rape, and prescribes penalties for rape or forcible sexual assault between 12 and 15 years imprisonment and fines up to 100,000 Surinamese dollars (SRD). Actions of domestic violence can impose sentences of 4 to 8 years by law. Currently, violence against women remains a very serious and prevalent issue in Suriname, with police receiving over 513 reports of sexual abuse in 2018 and 102 cases of domestic abuse.

The Victim Assistance Bureau of the Ministry of Justice and Police provide resources for victims of domestic violence and continue to raise awareness about domestic violence through public television programs. Police units are professionally trained by authorities to assist in cases of sexual and domestic crimes, for both victim and perpetrator. Shelters for victims and survivors of domestic violence are offered by The Victim Assistance Bureau, and manage on average 40 clientele a year. The Office for Gender Affairs of the Ministry of Home Affairs launched an awareness campaign in May 2018 against domestic violence nationwide.

==== Sexual harassment ====
There is currently no specific legislation on sexual harassment, however, prosecutors have cited various penal code articles in filing sexual harassment cases. There are no reported court cases involving sexual harassment in the workplace.

=== Sexual exploitation ===
The commercial sexual exploitation of children, the sale of children, child prostitution and practices related to child pornography is prohibited under Suriname law. The legal age of sexual consent is 14. Trafficking- inpersons legislation holds the sexual exploitation of a persons younger than 18 illegal. Suriname criminal law penalises persons responsible for the offering or procurement of child prostitution, with fines of up to SRD 100,000 and up to six years imprisonment. Criminal Law prohibits child pornography, carrying fines up to SRD 50,000 and up to six years imprisonment.

== Indigenous and tribal rights ==
Suriname is the only country in the Americas that has not yet legally recognised the collective rights of the indigenous and tribal peoples to the lands and resources they actually occupy. The individual indigenous and tribes and the Maroon tribes, who are of African descent, are recognised by the Suriname government, but hold no separate status under national law, and no effective demarcation of their land.

Maroons are tribal people in Suriname who are descendants of African slaves. They were brought to Suriname mainly in the 1600s and later fled the slave plantations and established independent communities in the interior where they now live in conditions comparable to indigenous tribes. Maroons participate in regional governing bodies, as well as in the National Assembly, and were part of governing coalitions.

Many Amerindians and Maroons live in rural and under-developed areas with minimal and restricted access to education, employment, and medical and social services. The groups participate in decisions affecting their tradition and culture, however are permitted limited influence over the decisions impacting the exploitation of energy, Minerals, timber and other natural resources on their traditional lands. Thus, these populations continue to face problems regarding illegal and uncontrolled logging and mining. No laws grant the communities the right to share in the profit created from the exploitation of resources on their land.

== LGBTQI rights ==
The Suriname constitution prohibits various forms of discrimination, however does not address sexual orientation or gender identity. Both male and female, same sex sexual activity is legal in Suriname. Same-sex marriage, Civil unions or Domestic partnerships are yet to be recognised under national law. Suriname is legally bound to the 2018 Inter-American Court of Human Rights ruling, which holds that same-sex marriage is a human right protected by the American Convention on Human Rights. Under articles 175, 175a and 176 of the Surinamese Penal Code, the law prohibits discrimination and hate speech based on sexual orientation, specifically protecting the LGBTQI community. Violations are punishable by a fine or prison sentence up to one year.

== Prisoner rights ==
=== Mistreatment by police ===
Under the Constitution, the practice of torture and degrading treatment or punishment is illegal. However, human rights groups, defence attorneys and the media continuously report instances of mistreatment by the police, including unnecessary use of force during arrests and beatings in prisons. The government has taken numerous steps to investigate, prosecute and punish officials who have violated the laws and committed human rights abuse, whether in security forces or elsewhere within the government. The public have continuously voiced concern that high public officials and security officers have impunity from enforcement.

The law prohibits arbitrary or undue arrest and detention, and provides for the right of any person to challenge the lawfulness of their arrest or detention in court. The government generally observes these prohibitions.

=== Physical conditions ===
Whilst seen to generally uphold international standards, Suriname's 26 detention centres have been seen as impoverished for a long time – the prison cells are over-crowded and understaffed. With a high prisoner-to-guard ration and lack of Emergency exits and evacuation drills, prison staff have no standard operating procedure and struggle to control inmates. Hygienic conditions are also found to be generally poor; with inadequate lighting and ventilation, along with Flooding problems induce through poor drainage in various facilities.

== Refugee rights ==
As of September 2015, Suriname has not developed any independent national asylum or refugee legislation. However, Asylum seekers and Refugees are provided the granting of status under Suriname law. The country relies on United Nations High Commissioner for Refugees (UNHCR) to conduct registration and assign asylum seekers or refugees status in the country. Once status has been verified, the government has established a system of providing protection to refugees; refugees or asylum seekers obtain residency permits under the alien legislation law. The Suriname Red Cross was the local point of contact for those filing for refugee status with the UNHCR.
