= Human rights in the Marshall Islands =

The Marshall Islands is a country in the Pacific spread over 29 coral atolls, with 1,156 islands and islets. It has an estimated population of 68,480 and is one of the sixteen member states of the Pacific Islands Forum. Since 1979, the Marshall Islands has been self-governing.

While the Marshall Islands has a Bill of Rights guaranteeing fundamental rights and freedom from discrimination, it is home to a number of human rights issues. According to the Marshall Islands 2015 Human Rights Report, the "most significant human rights problems included prison conditions, chronic government corruption, and chronic domestic violence" and other human rights problems included "child abuse, sex trafficking, and lack of legal provisions protecting workers' rights."

== Legal framework ==
=== International obligations ===
As a member state of the United Nations the Marshall Islands is subject to the Universal Periodic Review (UPR), a process that involves a review of human rights records. By the time of its UPR in 2010, the Marshall Islands, among other states in the Asia Pacific, was reluctant to form a National Human Rights Institution despite recommendations for its establishment from the Human Rights Council. However, in 2015 the Marshall Islands passed legislation to set up a Human Rights Committee and related procedures.

The Marshall Islands has ratified the following agreements:

- Convention on the rights of the child (CRC)
- Convention on the Elimination of All Forms of Discrimination Against Women (CEDAW)
- Convention against corruption
- Convention on the rights of persons with disabilities (CRPD)

However, no international treaty has force in law until it is approved by the Nitijela (Parliament).

Although the Marshall Islands intends to ratify the outstanding human rights conventions, its resource constraints have made full implementation of human rights conventions difficult in the past.

=== Constitution ===
The Constitution of the Republic of the Marshall Islands sets out the powers and functions of the executive, legislative and judicial branches of Government.

Article II of the Constitution contains a Bill of Rights which outlines the basic rights afforded to people in the Marshall Islands. These rights include equal protection to men and women and freedom from discrimination, personal autonomy and privacy, access to health education and legal services, ethical government and other rights retained by the people.

Jean Zorn says that the rights expressed and explained in Article II "tend to follow American models closely, with no particular modifications to make them applicable to the special circumstances and culture of the Marshalls". Additionally, the Bill of Rights has been criticised for being of "such liberality that its practical application by [the Courts] would serve to defeat the purposes of the criminal justice system taking into account the circumstances now prevailing in the Republic."

=== Legislation ===
In 2015, the Nitijela (Parliament) enacted the Human Rights Committee Act 2015 in order to establish a Human Rights Committee and to provide for its "membership, functions, powers and administration" as well as to "establish a complaints mechanism for the redress of human rights violations".

== Human rights issues ==
=== Right to life ===
The death penalty was abolished by the Constitution when the small Pacific archipelago became independent in 1986.

=== Electoral rights ===
Legislative power is vested in the Nitijela (Parliament). The Nitijela has 33 seats which are elected under a system of universal suffrage. Access to electoral processes is protected by sections 14(2) and (3) of the Bill of Rights.

Citizens of the Marshall Islands are not qualified to be registered as an elector if they:

- are under the age of 18
- are certified to be insane
- are serving a sentence of imprisonment or is released on parole or probation in respect of their conviction for a felony

Absentee voting is allowed. Since many Marshallese reside in the US, the majority of votes are cast by people who are not experiencing life in the Marshall Islands.

=== Access to justice ===
Access to judicial process is protected by section 14 of the Bill of Rights. According to subsection 1, "[e]very person has the right to invoke the judicial process as a means of vindicating any interest preserved or created by law, subject only to regulations which limit access to courts on a non-discriminatory basis."

Furthermore, section 4 of the Bill of Rights entitled, "Due Process and Fair Trials", expresses that "no person shall be deprived of ... liberty, or property without due process of law."

=== Freedom of religion ===
The Constitution expressly provides for freedom of thought, conscience and belief. This seems to have been adhered to as there have been no reports of major societal actions affecting religious freedom. While the majority (around 52 percent) of the population belongs to the United Church of Christ, there are also a number of other religions practiced and there is no one particular religion enforced in public schools. Rather, most schools merely begin and end certain events with an interdenominational Christian prayer.

=== Freedom of expression ===
Freedom of expression is guaranteed by section 1(2)(c) of the Bill of Rights, which states that no-one will be penalized merely on the basis of disagreement with the ideas or beliefs expressed.

=== Labor law ===
The Government is the main employer in the Marshall Islands. There is no legislation relating to collective bargaining, trade union organization or striking.

The current minimum wage is US$2.00 per hour but a 2016 Amendment Bill intends to increase the amount to US$3.00 per hour. The minimum wage is lower than in the US. This, along with the fact that the Compact of Free Association entitles Marshallese citizens to live, work and study in the US visa-free as "non-immigrant residents", has resulted in many Marshallese citizens migrating to the US for its higher wages and standards of living.

The Marshall Islands has been a member of the International Labour Organization (ILO) since 2007, although, its involvement has been limited.

=== Racial discrimination ===
Section 12 of the Bill of Rights headed, "Equal protection and Freedom from Discrimination", guarantees protection against discrimination on the basis of race, among other factors.

=== Women's rights ===
Women's rights are a significant issue in the Marshall Islands "given the absence in the over-arching freedom from discrimination clause of sex or gender as a prohibited ground of discrimination." Furthermore, while the Constitution guarantees equal protection of the law, the CEDAW Legislative Compliance Review noted the Constitution does not guarantee equal benefits or outcomes as required by [CEDAW].

Despite this, the Marshall Islands achieved its 2015 targets relating to gender equality and women's empowerment set by the Millennium Development Goals.

=== LGBT rights ===
Equal age of consent has also existed since 2005.

=== Children's rights ===
While the Marshall Islands has ratified the Convention on the Rights of the Child, it does not yet have force of law. However, "national law is interpreted where possible in a manner consistent with the CRC and other international human rights obligations."

Other than sections 119-113 of the Domestic Relations Act 1980, there are no laws or official procedures for adoption. This gives the courts, under section 119, license to create their own rules and procedures relating to adoption. Jack Jorban says this is contrary to the Bill of Rights which is contained in the Constitution of the Republic of the Marshall Islands.

Although the Constitution prohibits discrimination on certain grounds, the Committee on the Rights of the Child stated in its concluding observation in 2007, that it remained concerned that the principle of non-discrimination was not fully implemented for children living in the outer islands and in disadvantaged urban communities, "especially with regard to their access to adequate health and educational facilities."

=== Rights of persons with disabilities ===
In addition to ratifying the Convention on the Rights of Persons with Disabilities (CRPD) in 2015, the Marshall Islands passed into law the Human Rights Committee Act 2015, the Domestic Violence Protection Prevention Act 2011, the Child Protection Act 2015 and the Rights of Persons with Disabilities Act 2015.

The Constitution does not include disability in its listing of specific prohibited grounds of discrimination. Additionally, the Marshall Islands National Policy on Disability Inclusive Development – 2014-2018 states that "attitudes towards PWD [persons with disabilities] are typically negative with teasing and mocking commonplace, reinforcing stigma and stereotypes."

=== Human trafficking ===
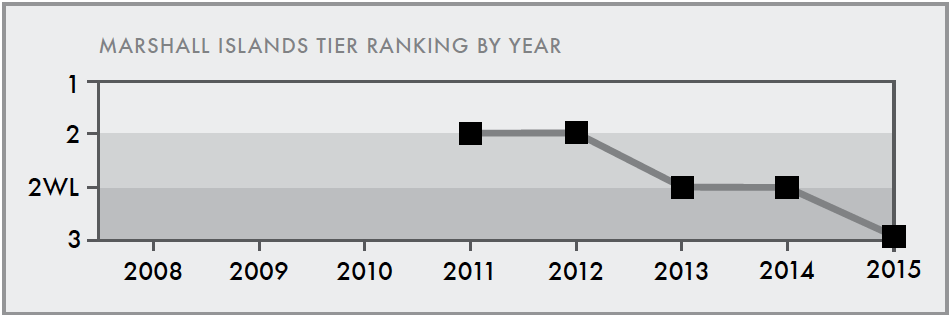
Marshall Islands Tier Ranking by Year. Source: Trafficking in Persons Report 2015 at 240.

The Trafficking in Persons Report 2015 categorized the Marshall Islands as a Tier 3 country in regards to human trafficking which means it does not fully comply with the minimum standards and is not making significant efforts to do so. This categorization occurred automatically because any country that has been rated Tier 2 Watch List for two consecutive years, will receive Tier 3 ranking in the third year. Additionally, the RMI does not have a written plan for bringing itself into compliance with the minimum standards for the elimination of trafficking and consequently its automatic Tier 3 status cannot be waived.

It is both a source and destination country for RMI women and girls and women from East Asia subjected to sex trafficking.

== Human rights projects ==
There have been several human rights initiatives that have aimed at improving various human rights issues in the Marshall Islands. For instance, United Nations Women has a Marshall Island project which was completed in 2010, aimed at enabling Marshallese women to fully participate in democratic processes and address gender imbalance at all levels of decision-making.

== Human rights in the news ==
=== Nuclear testing ===
Human rights in the Marshall Islands have been violated, particularly as a result of US nuclear testing. During the Cold War, the Marshall Islands was used as a testing site for the US's expanding nuclear arsenal. For instance, between 1946 and 1958, 67 nuclear tests were conducted at the islands. The Castle Bravo test of March 1954 is particularly poignant because it released thirty times more radioactive iodine than the 2011 Fukushima and 1986 Chernobyl leaks combined.
