= Human rights in Malta =

Malta is a democratic republic whose human rights are constitutionally defined. Human rights concern the expression and treatment of other citizens, panning areas including religion, expression, and labour. The constitution acts as an impartial determinant in civil matters, including human rights issues. The Maltese ombudsmen are authorised to investigate disputes which infract the laws as determined by the constitution. Several organisations and NGOs have been established with the aim of creating awareness and calling for change around certain freedoms and rights within Malta. The constitution contains similar freedoms to that of other European nations and to aims to reach the standards as established by The Universal Declaration of Human Rights (UDHR).

== History ==
Characterised by the influence of British rule in Malta, the origins and development of Maltese human rights can be strongly traced back to the governmental practices in the United Kingdom. On 15 June 1802, 104 representatives from the Maltese towns and villages signed a declaration which affirmed a monarchical power and a fundamental set of rights:

- Free men have a right to choose their own religion.
- That no man whatsoever has any personal authority over the life, property or liberty of another.
- Power resides only in the law, and restraint, or punishment, can only be exercised in obedience to law.

Following World War I, Malta was stricken by an inability to provide basic food supplies and for a majority of the islands, increasing the cost of living after the war. However, some divisions of the society (grain importers, merchants) prospered economically, spurring social discontent towards the state. Dr Filippo Sceberras of the Malta National Assembly worked to defend the nation and bring about social and political changes. He had called for a meeting of the National Assembly on 7 June 1919. During the conduction of the National Assembly, a demonstrator crowd rioted with resent towards the current British command. This resulted in the loss of four Maltese citizens at the hand of British Soldiers, now honoured as a national holiday, Sette Giugno. In the aftermath of this complication, constitutional progress was expedited and on 20 November 1919, the Maltese were assured to be granted their own parliament, allowing for the domestic settlement of internal affairs. A new constitution was subsequently granted on 30 April 1921. Elections were held and in November, the first Maltese Parliament was congregated.

The 1941 Constitution had at its source the European Convention on Human Rights, made effective in 1953. It asserted the entitlement of each person in Malta to fundamental rights and freedoms of an individual. Malta acquired independence from the British Empire in September 1964. The 1964 Constitution contained an extensive and judicially enforceable bill of rights e.g., the right to life and security of the person, privacy of the home and other property. In 2004, Malta joined the European Union.

== Sources of rights ==
The source of rights is primarily founded within the Constitution of Malta. Chapter II (Declaration of Principles) iterates a list of sixteen (Articles 7 - 21) explicit rights that provide the foundation for the rights enforced by the nation, as article 21 (Application of the principles) states:

"The provisions of this Chapter shall not be enforceable in any court, ... and it shall be the aim of the State to apply these principles in making laws."

However, the protection of human rights is enforced by the Constitution of Malta in Chapter IV (Fundamental Rights and Freedoms of the Individual; Articles 32 - 45) Primarily, these rights strive to achieve three basic principles as outlined in the constitution:

"(a) life, liberty, security of the person, the enjoyment of property and the protection of the law;

(b) freedom of conscience, of expression and of peaceful assembly and association; and

(c) respect for his private and family life" (Article 32).

In addition to the Constitution, The Statute Law Revision Act, 1980 and the Laws of Malta contribute to the judicial enforcement and regulation of rights within the nation. The constituents of Maltese law include over 600 chapters that concern the conduct of individuals, their rights, and their respective treatment of other individuals.

== Freedoms ==
A basic outline of national rights is outlined in Chapter II (Declaration of Principles) of the Maltese Constitution:

7. Right to Work.

8. Promotion of culture, etc.

9. Safeguarding of landscape and historical and artistic patrimony.

10. Compulsory and free primary education.

11. Educational interests.

12. Protection of work.

13. Hours of work.

- 48 hours is the legal maximum hours of work. (Following 40 hours, the eight additional hours have to be paid for in overtime compensation)
- While working in Malta, you are legally entitled to 25 days of annual leave. Workers are also entitled to days off on public holidays that do not fall on a Saturday or Sunday.

14. Equal rights of men and women.

15. Minimum age for paid labour.

- The minimum age for employment is 16 years

National Minimum Wage (per week)
| Aged 18 year and over | €175.84 |
| Age 17 years | €169.06 |
| Under 17 years | €166.22 |

16. Safeguarding labour of minors.

17. Social assistance and insurance.

18. Encouragement of private economic enterprise.

19. Protection of artisan trades.

20. Encouragement of co-operatives.

20A. Participation of Maltese citizens living abroad.

21. Application of the principles.

The Constitution provides that limitations should aim to ensure that the enjoyment of rights and freedoms of any individual does not prejudice the rights and freedoms of others or the public interest. The law criminalises speech that promotes hatred on grounds of gender, gender identity, sexual orientation, race, colour, language, ethnic origin, religion or belief, or political or other opinions. Incitement to religious hatred is punishable by a prison term of six to 18 months.

== Treatment of groups and minorities ==
In principle every fundamental right and freedom applies equally to all people, however, Malta has experienced events and have reported scenarios which represent a level of inequity between groups and minorities.

=== Asylum seekers and refugees ===
The law provides for the granting of asylum or refugee status, and the government has established a system for providing protection to refugees. Malta is a signatory to

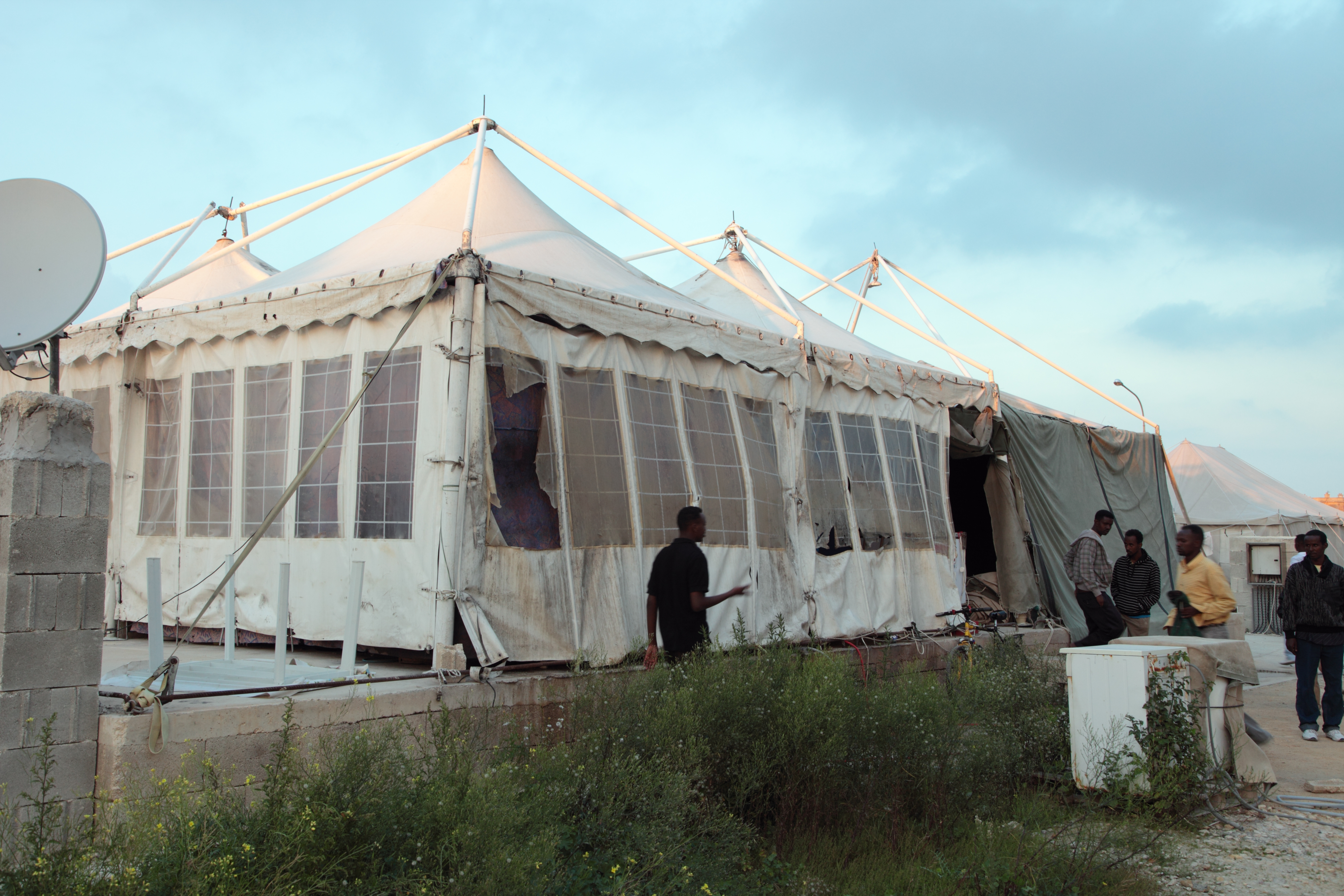
Maltese refugee camp

the 1951 Refugee Convention relating to the Status of Refugees and its 1967 Protocol since 1971.

Once an asylum seeker has filed an application he/she has the following rights:

- The right to remain in Malta pending the examination of the case.
- The right to receive information about the asylum procedure.
- The right to receive the services of an interpreter.
- The right to communicate with UNHCR.
- The right to seek legal assistance.
- The right to confidentiality.

Between January 2018 and September 2018, 100 persons were granted refugee status. From January 2018 to August 2018, the country granted subsidiary protection to 334 persons

=== LGBT ===
Malta has been recognised for providing a high degree of liberty to its LGBT citizens. Malta is one of the only few countries in the world to have made LGBT rights equal at a constitutional level. Malta is now ranked number one in the ILGA-Europe (International Lesbian, Gay, Bisexual, Trans and Intersex Association) ranking of all 49 countries in Europe in terms of their respect for human rights and equality.

The Maltese government also introduced another measure in support of LGBTQ+ rights by introducing the non-binary "X" gender as an option on official documentation.

=== Women's Rights ===
Despite an explicit aim towards the achievement of equality between men and women found in the constitution, "...the State shall in particular aim at ensuring that women workers enjoy equal rights and the same wages for the same work as men." (Article 14), Malta is still considered to be behind the EU average in gender equality. As of 2015, Malta is still ranked 15th in the EU-28, according to an index published by the European Institute for Gender Equality.

Organisations including the National Council of Women Malta (NCW) and the Women's Rights foundation exist as an external body that promotes the rights and the education of women about their respective rights. For example, The National Council of Women Malta publishes annual resolutions which address a multitude of issues not limited to women's rights.

NCW resolutions January 2019 included:

- Life balance and Gender Pay Gap
- A holistic approach to migration
- Increase in paid paternity leave for fathers

In 2014, the government introduced free childcare for parents in work and education, as well as morning and post-school care. Since then the number of women re-entering the labour market after childbirth has risen by 6%. Between 2005 and 2015, the average monthly earnings of women and men increased, although the gender gap slightly widened. Women earn approximately 15% less than men per month.

=== Disability ===
The Equal Opportunities (Persons with Disability) Act (Act I of 2000) (Chapter 413), prohibits unfair discrimination on the premise of disability. The scope of this act ranges from employment to accessing public facilities and the covers all elements that constitute the freedoms aligning with regular citizens. As defined within the act, the "rights of persons with disability" encompass the relevant rights as outlined in the United Nations Convention on the Rights of Persons with Disabilities, adopted on the 13th December 2006. Articles contained in this convention include Right to Life (Article 10), Freedom from Exploitation, violence and abuse (Article 16), and Adequate standard of living and social protection (Article 28). The Act also states that the State upholds the responsibility to provide any information and an early and comprehensive intervention to potential disabilities, as well as services and help to children with disability and their families. Article 16 of the Maltese constitution states "disabled persons and persons incapable of work are entitled to education and vocational training." The Malta National Disability Strategy has been implemented with the intention of every person with disability becoming an active citizen with the freedom to make individual choices and choices that contribute to society. The goal of the strategy is to facilitate better opportunities for people with disabilities in the labour market, improving the educational experience, providing social services, and ultimately promoting basic human rights.

== See also ==
- Abortion in Malta
