= Human rights in Saint Vincent and the Grenadines =

Human rights in Saint Vincent and the Grenadines are protected by international conventions and domestic legal framework. The country has ratified a number of United Nations conventions regarding human rights and its constitution guarantees some basic human rights, such as the right to fair trial and freedom from torture. However, clauses guaranteeing socio-economic rights, such as the right to education, and guarding against discrimination are "almost non-existent" in the constitution. There are also no individual complaints procedures for some of the ratified conventions.

In 2014, Freedom House ranked Saint Vincent and the Grenadines as "free", the highest possible band. The country has been criticized for its high incidence of rape and prevalence of domestic violence, as well as a "cultural epidemic" that renders women dependent on men and allows perpetrators of gender-based violence to go unpunished. There are no provisions in the constitution guaranteeing gender equality.

== Gender equality ==
A 2014 study for the University of Quebec at Montreal (UQAM) found that the "patriarchal structure" of the Vincentian society made women dependent on their husbands on partners financially, which increased their vulnerability to violence, and thus led to a "cultural epidemic of violence against women". There were no provisions in the constitution guaranteeing gender equality. A United Nations Office on Drugs and Crime report in 2011 placed the country at the fourth highest place globally in terms of its rate of rapes. According to the US Department of State, too, many women are "marginalized" and cannot enjoy full equality due to their financial dependence.

In 2013, the US Department of State reported that violence against women was a "serious and pervasive problem". Domestic violence is not specifically criminalized, and while charges may be brought up by the authorities, the police is usually reportedly reluctant to follow up the cases, resulting in the perpetrators enjoying impunity. A crisis center was opened in 2012 for sufferers of domestic violence, but its secret location was reportedly compromised. Sexual harassment is also not prohibited under law, and while it can be possibly prosecuted under the law, its prosecution is seen as ineffective by women's rights groups. According to the UQAM study, domestic violence is considered a civil issue instead of a criminal one and there is no obligation for officers to investigate. The Domestic Violence Act also excludes women who do not cohabit with the perpetrators.

There was an increase in reported rape cases in 2012–2013. The cases are referred to the police, but according to the US Department of State, fear of reprisal may deter some survivors from seeking assistance. Police and human rights groups also reported that perpetrators commonly made payoffs to survivors of rape or sexual assault in exchange for survivors not pressing charges. The UQAM study also concluded that incest was a major problem in the country, and found that "girls being raped by uncles and cousins" were not considered victims of incest. In 2008, despite 36 cases of rape being reported to criminal courts, no cases were opened.

Toronto Star reported that the extent and culture of gender-based violence and the "climate of impunity" for its perpetrators has forced women to seek refuge abroad. A number amounting to 4.3% of the country's population has reportedly sought refuge in Canada in the 21st century, the majority of them being women, mostly fleeing from domestic violence.

Women are also underrepresented in politics, as they only occupy 3 of the 23 seats of the parliament.

== Freedoms ==
=== Freedom of speech ===
According to the US Department of State in 2013, the constitution and law provided for the freedom of speech and press, and the government generally respected these rights. An independent press, an effective judiciary, and a functioning democratic political system combined to ensure freedom of speech and press. An independent media engaged in the free expression of a wide variety of views, though some libel cases, used by politicians to preserve their reputation, and press being rebuked by officials were identified as issues that could reportedly lead to self-censorship. Freedom House concurred with the statements by the Department of State in 2014 and drew attention to the libel cases and threats of suing press members by the prime minister.

According to Amnesty International, in 2008, Nicole Sylvester, the President of the St Vincent and the Grenadines Human Rights Association, was subjected to threats and intimidation, with the car of one of her colleagues being followed, allegedly due to the association's involvement in a rape case. According to the Commonwealth Human Rights Initiative, "from most accounts [the country] enjoys a relatively high standard of freedom of speech and free press", but the unlawful arrest of a Canadian journalist in Kingstown was an issue in 2009.

=== Freedom of religion ===
According to both Freedom House and the US Department of State, religious freedom is respected. There is Christian religious instruction at schools, but students may choose to opt out. Rastafari claimed that they faced extra scrutiny from police and immigration officials and that some officials searched their dreadlocks.

== See also ==
- Human trafficking in Saint Vincent and the Grenadines
- LGBT rights in Saint Vincent and the Grenadines
