= Human rights in Portugal =

Portugal is generally considered as successful in upholding the civil liberties and protecting the human rights of its citizens. Portugal has proved to be determined in promoting and respecting human rights at an international and national level. The country's minister of Justice as of September 2018, Francisca Van Dunem, said that Portugal has had "a good track record" on human rights but violations still do persist.

Portugal is a member state of the European Union and therefore its citizens are protected by its Charter of Fundamental Rights. In addition to being a member of the European Union, Portugal is also a member state of the United Nations and has signed the Universal Declaration of Human Rights.

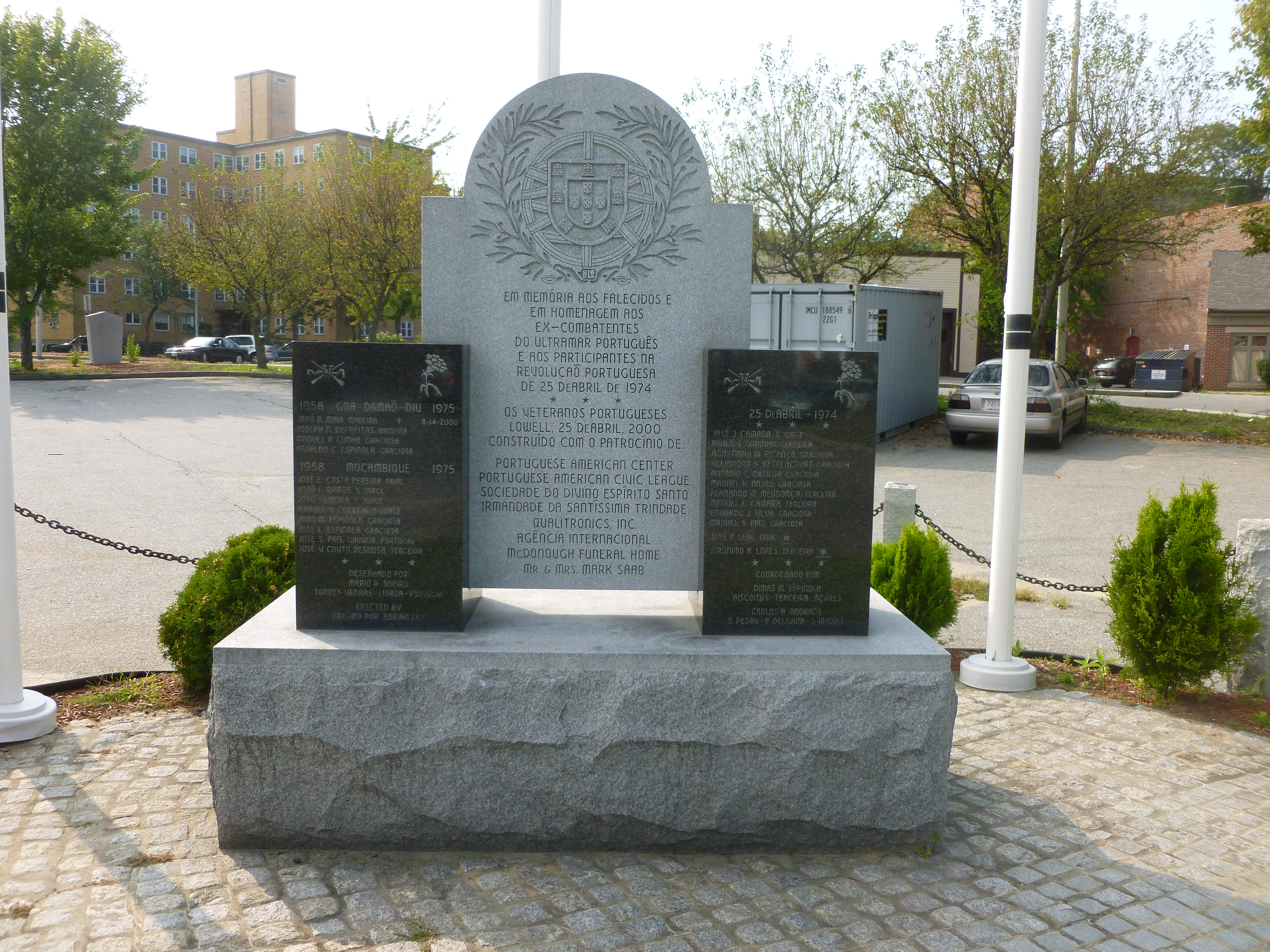
Portuguese Colonial Wars and Carnation Revolution memorial

== History ==
On 25 April 1974 a military coup ended the Estado Novo regime which concluded fascism in Portugal and was the beginning of a new democracy after 48 years of a dictatorship and 13 years of colonial war. This led to a parliamentary democracy and the new 1976 Constitution of the Portuguese Republic which guaranteed its citizens fundamental rights. The citizens fundamental rights and duties are specified in Part 1 I of The Constitution.

Before this Portugal was already a member of the United Nations, they had become a member on 14 December 1955. Although a member since 1955 it was not until after they regained democracy in 1974 that Portugal became an active member of the United Nations Commission on Human Rights which encouraged the protection and promotion of all Human Rights everywhere in the world. In 1979, Portugal established its own health care system which offered free access to health care for the first time to all its citizens. This upholds Article 25 of the Universal Declaration of Human Rights which states "Everyone has the right to a standard of living adequate for the health and well-being of himself and of his family, including food, clothing, housing and medical care and necessary social services, and the right to security in the event of unemployment, sickness, disability, widowhood, old age or other lack of livelihood in circumstances beyond his control".

On January 1, 1986, Portugal formally joined the European Union after applying to join on March 28, 1977. Within the European Union they have the European Convention on Human Rights which Portugal has signed and ratified so therefore made a legal commitment to abide by certain standards of behaviour.

== Children's rights ==
In 1990, Portugal became a signatory and ratified the Convention on the Rights of the Child. In 2003, they also signed and ratified the Convention's optional protocols on the Involvement of Children in Armed Conflict and on the Sale of Children, Child Prostitution and Child Pornography. In 2013 they then signed and ratified the Optional Protocol on the Rights of the Child on a Communications Procedure.

=== Poverty ===
Signing and ratifying the convention and the optional protocols has caused an increase in resources allocated to improving the rights of children in Portugal. Although there have been improvements there are still serious issues affecting children's rights. One in five of children, 20%, lives below the poverty line and Portugal is one of the top eight countries with the highest poverty levels among children.

=== Sexual exploitation ===
Portugal has become a new route for Sub-Saharan African criminal networks to traffic children into the Schengen area for sexual exploitation The ECPAT Internationals global study in 2016 discovered that Portugal was becoming an increasingly popular travel destination for child sex offenders. The laws in place to combat this issue come under Article 160(2) of the Portuguese Penal Code and states the punishments of prison sentences from three to ten years for the offence of child trafficking for the purpose of exploitation including sexual exploitation. Although these measures are in place, a draft law on the creation of a national strategy to protect children against sexual exploitation and abuse was submitted to the assembly but was not adopted.

== LGBTQ rights ==
Until 1982, homosexuality was a crime. It was in 1982 when amendments were made that decriminalised homosexual relations between people over the age of sixteen in private. The LGBTQ community in Portugal benefited when the country joined the European Union on 1 January 1986 through gaining access to freedoms enjoyed in other EU member states. After the decriminalisation of homosexuality, there was an emergence of LGBT organisations and gay rights groups in the 1990s in Portugal. Since 1982, Portugal progressed quickly in legal advances in protecting and upholding the rights of the LGBTQ community. It was in 2001 that they acknowledged civil unions for same-sex couples. Then, in 2004 they introduced constitutional rights that explicitly forbid discrimination that is based on someone's sexual orientation and are one of the few countries in the world to include this in their constitution. In 2010, they also legalised same-sex marriage, being the ninth country in the world to do so at the time. In 2016, the adoption of children by same-sex couples was legalised.

Relative to the rest of the world's countries, Portugal has been acknowledged as progressive with the rights of the LGBT community. More recently, in April 2018 the Portuguese parliament approved a law which allows transgender people to have their preferred gender legally recognised by the government without having to be evaluated by medical professionals. Portugal are one of only six European nations to allow this. With this bill they also banned the unnecessary surgery on intersex infants which can cause life-long pain, health complications and loss of sexual sensation.

The ILGA Portugal which is a private social solidarity institution which protects the rights of the LGBT community within Portugal awarded the rainbow prize to the judicial police college for its training programme focusing on the discrimination against LGBT persons.

== Women's rights ==
=== History ===
Before the overthrow of the authoritarian government in 1974, women were restricted by the Portuguese penal code and had no contact with international women's groups, thus having little organisational power. With the new constitution in 1976, women gained the same legal equality as men. The Commission on the Status of Women (renamed the Commission for Equality and Women's Rights in 1991) had the role to improve the position of women in Portugal and protect their rights, it was established in 1977. Then twenty years later the Council of Ministers integrated a gender perspective at all policy levels and since then several national plans for equality have been issued.

=== Gender Equality Index ===
In the Gender Equality Index 2017 which uses a scale from 1, full inequality, to 100, full equality, Portugal scored a 56 which is 10 points lower than the European Union average. This demonstrates that Portugal is below average with its progression with women's rights. Although its score was below average it did show higher than the average progress from 2005 to 2015 increasing its score by 6.1.

=== National action plan ===
Portugal has a national action plan which covers domestic and sexual violence and is intended to combat domestic and gender-based violence (2014–2017). As well as this Portugal was the first country that is a part of the European Union to ratify the Council of Europe Convention on preventing and combating violence against women and domestic violence. Domestic violence is at the forefront of gender equality policies within Portugal with multiple strategies in place to fight the issue.

=== Abortion laws ===
Previous to February 2007 abortion law was strict and was only allowed if serious injury or death would be caused to the woman. In February 2007 there was a referendum that had a 59% vote in favour to decriminalise abortion. This gave women the ability to terminate a pregnancy up to the tenths week of pregnancy. Since this change of law it has overall reduced deaths and the number of abortions.

== Refugee rights ==
Portugal currently has in force The Asylum Act 27/2008 which is legislation that is considered in line with international and European Union standards. In conjunction with this Portugal is a state party to the 1954 Convention relating to the Status of Stateless Persons and to the 1961 Convention on the Reduction of Statelessness. It also accepted and ratified the 1951 Convention relating to the Status of Refugees in 1960. The 1951 Refugee Convention document which Portugal has ratified lays out the rights of refugees and also the legal obligations of states to protect them therefore refugees in Portugal are protected by these rights. Recently in 2018 Portugal's Prime Minister António Costa made a statement, "We need more immigration and we won’t tolerate any xenophobic rhetoric". This indicates Portugal's recent need for refugees to help counteract its declining population. Portugal is part of a voluntary programme which began in January 2018 by the European Commission which aims to resettle 50,000 refugees over the next two years.

Although Portugal has expressed a welcoming attitude towards refugees the United Nations High Commissioner for Refugees (UNHCR) have expressed concerns about the quality of reception conditions in Portugal. In 2012 UNHCR witnessed overcrowding at the existing reception facility and problems becoming worsened by the suspension of Social Security services.

== Current issues ==
=== Housing conditions for people of African descent and Roma ===
In Article 25 of the Universal Declaration of Human Rights it highlights the importance of the right to a standard of living including a house this is an issue for people of African descent and Roma within Portugal. In 1978 Portugal also ratified the International Covenant on Economic, Social and Cultural Rights which in Article 11 states the right to an adequate standard of living. As well as ratifying both of these treaties in Portugal's own constitution, Article 65, they acknowledge the general understanding on the importance of housing.

In 2016 the Human Rights Council conducted a Special Rapporteur on adequate housing in Lisbon and Porto. In this report it observed that there was a lack of social housing or rent supplement programmes which caused mostly the Roma or people of African descent to stay in informal settlements. These informal settlements did not provide an adequate standard of living and often had no electricity and were set amidst garbage. The report acknowledged that there was an economic crisis within Portugal but stated that the Roma and people of African descent have significantly inadequate housing solutions and that this issue needs to be combatted.

=== Torture and other ill-treatment ===
On 9 February 1989 Portugal ratified the United Nations Convention against Torture and other Cruel, Inhuman or Degrading Treatment or Punishment but there has been concerns by Amnesty International of allegations of torture and ill-treatment whilst in custody in Portugal. In 2016 the European Committee for the Prevention of Torture during its periodic visit to Portugal also raised concerns at the ill-treatment during police custody from a number of credible allegations. This alleged ill-treatment was largely aimed at prisoners of African descent and foreign nationals and consisted of kicks to the body and head, slaps, punches as well as beatings with batons. The Committee for the Prevention of Torture urged the Portuguese government to address this issue as well as the overcrowding within the prisons which was resulting in appalling living conditions.

The United Nations also in May 2018 dispatched members of its Prevention of Torture committee to visit and inspect prisons in Portugal to establish if the inmates have any protection against torture and ill-treatment. This occurred due to Portugal ratifying the Optional Protocol to the Convention Against Torture which places them under the obligation to allow the Subcommittee on Prevention of Torture to conduct unhindered and unannounced inspections to places where citizens are deprived of their liberty. The SPT after the visit urged the Portuguese government to establish a National Preventive Mechanism which is an independent monitoring body. They also suggested that they seek alternatives to detention and place more human and financial resources in to rehabilitation.

== See also ==
- Racism in Portugal
