= Human rights in Gabon =

Gabon, also known as the Gabonese Republic, is a sovereign state located in Central Africa along the Atlantic coastline. Gabon gained its independence from France in 1960. Human rights are rights that are inherent and universal to all human beings. Typical human rights include, freedom of speech, freedom of slavery, freedom of fair representation, a right to adequate living standards and exclusion of child labour. These human rights and more are included in the Declaration of Human Rights legislated by the United Nations of which the Gabonese Republic is a party. Gabon has signed multiple conventions (Note: such as the International Covenant on Civil and Political Rights, the International Covenant on Economic, Social and Cultural Rights, the International Convention on the Elimination of All Forms of Racial Discrimination, the Convention on the Elimination of All Forms of Discrimination Against Women, the United Nations Convention against Torture, the Convention on the Rights of the Child, the International Convention on the Protection of the Rights of All Migrant Workers and Members of Their Families, and Convention on the Rights of Persons with Disabilities) all of which are binding to them. However, despite Gabon having ratified many of these human rights conventions and laws within their own sovereign state there are still ongoing human right issues such as human trafficking, child trafficking, lack of political freedom and poverty. Political freedom is an essential human right in all societies and nations as it helps to protect democratic systems. The Gabonese governments have drawn criticism from multiple non-governmental organizations such as Freedom House and foreign governing bodies, especially the United States Department, for the lack of transparency of their political systems.

== Overview ==
According to Freedom House, Gabon’s freedom status remains “not free”. Freedom house, provides a rating of 1-7 of different types freedoms, with 1 being the most free and 7 being the least free. Gabon's political right's rating is 7/7, the lowest rating possible while its civil liberties rating is of 5/7 leading to a freedom rating of 6/7. A combination of these scores lead to an aggregate score of 23/100 with 0 being the last free.

== Political freedom ==
After gaining independence from France in 1960, Gabon has become a democratic nation which holds political elections. A multi-party system was also introduced in the 1990s to encourage transparency of their political systems. However, there has been political corruption relating to an essential model of governance for democratic nations, the separation of powers. In Gabon the executive branch of government is controlling the judicial branch, allowing for autocracy for President Ali Bongo Ondimba. This has meant that the president has been freely able to appoint and dismiss judges which violates the human right, a right to a fair public trial. The opposition leader Bertrand Zibi Abeghe in 2016 campaigned against Bongo's presidency was arrested in August and remained in prison till the end of 2017. Other political prisoners included participants from peaceful protests and Alain Djally who was an aide to Ping, another opposition leader. Under his presidency, there has been multiple postponements of electoral and legislative processes. National Assembly elections that were due, was postponed twice, from December 2016 to July 2017 to April 2018. Freedom of assembly are limited as the government denies permits for meetings and often arrest individuals who peacefully protests and deter demonstrations through the use of tear gas. Parliament has further restricted freedom of assembly through the enactment of a law that makes organisers responsible for offenses committed in peaceful protests. Authorities often use deadly force against political opponents and protestors.

== Press freedom ==
Although, there is no censorship of the media, press freedom is limited, as media outlets which criticise the government often face legal repercussions. Gabon's National Communication Council often monitors and accuses media outlets, journalist and individual reporters for defamation. In 2016 Les Echos du Nord a newspaper outlet faced legal repercussions in the form of a 2-month suspensions after criticising the lack of transparency of the electoral process and the postponement of them. Les Echos du Nord was again suspended a second time due to criticism of the vice president Pierre Claver Maganga Moussaou's purchase of a luxury car while journalist Juldas Biviga and union leader Marcel Libama was arrested for revealing judicial abuses of power within the court through a radio interview. An internet activist blogger, Landry Amiang Washington, faced imprisonment for a year from 2016 to 2017 following similar charges.

== Torture and other cruel, degrading treatment and punishment ==
Although, the constitution prohibits degrading practices and arbitrary arrest and detention without warrants, detainees are commonly subject to them. Following the arrest and detainment of both Juldas Biviga and Marcel Libama after the radio talk, both were beaten severely by guards, suffering injuries from the ankle to the ears. Juldas Biviga had to be hospitalised afterwards. Opposition leader Betrand Zbi Abeghe reported that he was subject to severe beatings by prison officials with batons, pick-axe handles and electrical cables. Refugees are also often subject to such treatments as soldiers and police often humiliate them by ordering them to undress and perform indecent acts in public. Refugee are also harassed by security forces and extorted them, often facing beatings if no valid identification is found on them. Prisoners often have no basic sanitation and access to medical care. There has been reports of sexual exploitation against 20 different Gabonese peacekeepers.

== Human trafficking ==
Human Trafficking infringes multiple human rights as it leads to sexual exploitation, slavery, organ harvesting, child labour and domestic servitude all of which is present in Gabon. Gabon has been reported as a transit human trafficking country for other neighbouring countries from West and Central Africa. The Trafficking Victims Protection Act is criteria set by the United States Congress to evaluate the level of commitment by government's in addressing the issue of modern slavery. The Gabon government has been given the lowest tier rating, tier 3 by the United States Department of State although previously being in tier 2. This is due to Gabon being reviewed for not making minimum efforts to meet the Trafficking Victims Protection Act's standard. Some legislative measures have been insufficient as they did not directly criminalise all forms of human trafficking. The Gabon government has also failed to pass an amendment that was introduced in 2013 to the law 09/04 which directly criminalises the sex trafficking of adults. In previous years, the Gabon government have conducted human trafficking particularly relating to adult matters awareness-raising programs, however, they did not make an effort to do so in 2018. Since 2011-2016 there has not been a human trafficker prosecuted by the courts through law enforcement agencies. Victims have the option of filing civil lawsuits against their traffickers but there have been no known cases of this occurring. There have also been reports of judges receiving bribes from traffickers to dismiss or to constantly delay cases of trafficking and exploitation. A Gabonese diplomat in the United Kingdom in 2016 was reported to have exploited a worker in domestic servitude. There are no non-governmental organizations funded by the government that provide any social services for adult victims and there has been a lack of cooperation with foreign law enforcement on transnational and international trafficking cases.

== Child trafficking ==
Child trafficking in contemporary Gabon consists of mainly forced labour, although there are still some cases of child soldiers and commercial sexual exploitation. Around 19.6% of the employment force is from forced child labour. The Gabonese government has responded to these issues through legislative responses such as signing the international law, Conventions on the Rights of a Child in 1990 and later ratifying it in 1994. There has been a decrease commitment to the issue of child trafficking-related matters. Although the government has drafted a 5-year plan that focused on the issue of child trafficking, they have not validated it. There has also been a lack of funding to the child trafficking committee which has led to a lack of ability to investigate related matters. Penalties that relate to child labour matters are below international standards. These penalties include a maximum fine of 20 million Central African franc which is around US$35,220, and a maximum imprisonment of 6 months. Prohibition of child trafficking is also below international standards as issues relating to commercial sexual exploitation of children are not completely prohibited. Pornographic material relating to children, that includes the procurement of them and also production of them is also not criminalised completely by the law. However, the government has increased efforts to protect child victims. A total of 65 child victims were identified in 2018 compared to 15 in 2016. Victims were provided with medical, legal and psychological care from shelters provided by non-governmental organizations funded by the Government. However, despite these increased efforts, government funding towards these non-governmental organizations in 2017 has decreased, leading to insufficient shelter space being provided to victims and the lower quality of social services.

== Poverty ==
Gabon has signed the International Covenant on Economic, Social and Cultural Rights on 16 December 1966, ratified it on 3 January 1976. Gabon has a below average HDI index of 0.702 in 2017 ranking Gabon 110 out of 186 nations. Gabon also has a medium Gini Inequality Coefficient of 42.2. Gabon GDP per capita is 4 time higher than most African countries at US$7413.8, despite this 15.2% of total employment are paid less than $3.10 a day which is below the working poor rate. This is due to the high levels of inequality is reflected in Gini Coefficient and its reliance on oil exportation which accounts for 80% of their exports but only 5% of their employment. The poverty headcount rate was 32.7% in 2005 and increased to 33.4% in 2017 while 13.2% of the population still live in severe poverty. The overall unemployment rate in Gabon is 20% while unemployment for young people are particularly effected at 35.7%.

== Healthcare ==
Gabon also has a high level of child mortality rate due to malnutrition under the age of 5 of 17%. The Gabonese government has responded to this issue by ratifying the International Code of Marketing of Breast-milk substitutes, in order to promote breastfeeding over other forms of infant feeding. This is primarily done through regulation of marketing practices and information provided that incentive for mothers to breastfeed. However, social health insurance known as Caisse Nationale d'Assurance Maladie et de Garantie Sociale, (CNAMGS) introduced by the government has benefited all socioeconomic groups. The universal health care has meant a medical care reimbursement of 80-90% while maternal health is fully covered. This has meant a decrease of HIV infection by 50% while AIDS-related deaths have decreased by 32% since 2010 when CNAMGS was introduced. Malaria has also been a consistent health issue within Gabon as 206.2 people out of 1000. This is due to less than 50% of the population being able to access the long lasting insecticidal nets and indoor residual sprays both which prevent the spread of malaria. This is due to Gabon being ineligible for the Global Fund support due to the shortage of international funding which provides the long lasting insecticidal nets and indoor residual sprays.
