= Human rights in Nicaragua =

Human rights in Nicaragua refer to personable, political and social rights granted to every human in Nicaragua. Nicaragua derives its understanding of human rights from the Constitution of Nicaragua and international law. Nicaragua is a member state of the United Nations which states that fundamental human rights, such as freedom from slavery and freedom of expression, are enabled for all human beings without discrimination.

In 2019, anti-government protests spread across the country in response to the Sandinista National Liberation Front (In Spanish Frente Sandinista de Liberación Nacional FSLN) government's reforms of the country's social security system. This sparked a response from parapolicial groups, the National Police, and monitoring and control groups. Reports state that 328 protesters were killed in the backlash (as of 20 Sep 2019). This brought international attention to enactment of human rights within the country with organisations such as the United Nations and Organization of American States determining the events to be violations of the Universal Declaration of Human Rights.

== Nicaraguan Constitution mentions of human rights ==
The Constitution of Nicaragua was promulgated in 1987 with the latest amendments made in 2014. It was created to determine a democratic system of order to the government. Listed below are the sections of the Nicaraguan Constitution which highlight the laws and principles of human rights within the country.

=== Title I: Fundamental Principle ===
Article 5 states that Nicaragua values include the recognition and protection of the indigenous people and those of African descent; all political views may be expressed freely; people with disabilities are to be treated equally and without discrimination; socialist ideals determine that the common good is more important than individual benefit, and opposes exploitation among human beings; all people are valued equally in a system which will benefit the most impoverished, disadvantaged and marginalized people; the Nicaraguan people will experience unity through equality; and all people have the right to own property without discrimination.

=== Title IV: Rights, Duties and Guarantees of the Nicaraguan People ===
==== Chapter I: Individual Rights ====
This chapter determines the Nicaraguan people's rights to life; rights to privacy; rights to protect one's reputation; rights to protection from the State; rights to information; freedom of expression; freedom of religion; rights to a fair, speedy and public trial with the presumption of innocence and rights to counsel; freedom of movement; protection from false imprisonment; prohibition of corporal punishment, cruel treatment and torture; prohibition of slavery.

Article 27 states that all people within its territory, or subject to its jurisdiction, are equal and have the right to equal protection regardless of gender, belief, social status, financial status, political party affiliation, parentage, nationality, origin, race, language, or religion.

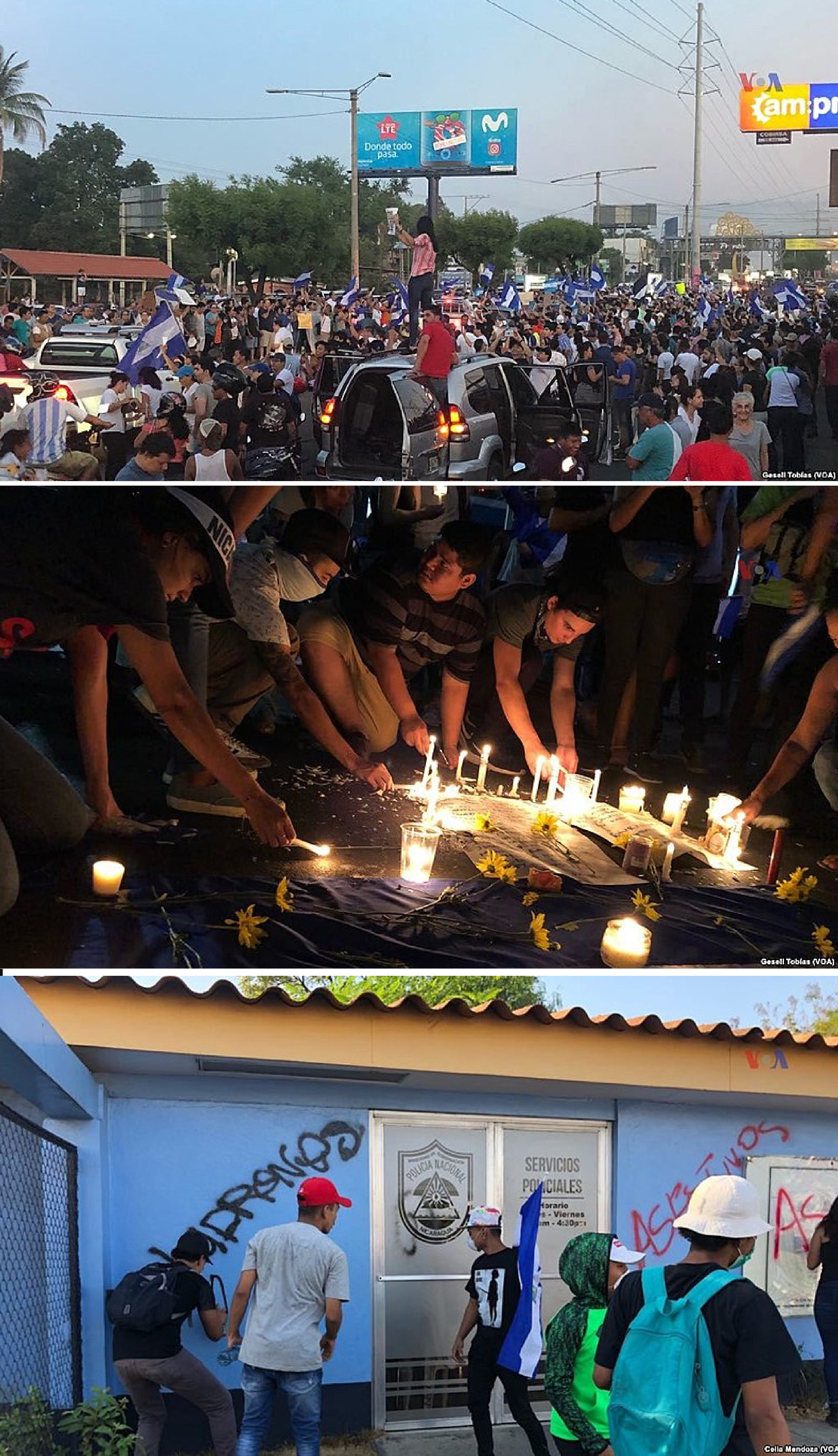
Nicaraguan protests in 2018

==== Chapter II: Political Rights ====
This chapter determines that all Nicaraguan people have the right to exercise political rights regardless of gender; rights to freedom of political association; rights of individual or collective petitions; and rights to form political parties.

Article 53 states that the State recognizes the right to peaceful gathering without prior permission.

Article 54 states that "the right to public assembly, demonstration and mobilization in conformity with the law is recognized".

==== Chapter III: Social Rights ====
This chapter determines the Nicaraguan peoples' rights to work; rights to culture; rights to health care; rights to live in a healthy environment and obligations to maintain this environment; rights to social security; rights to be protected against hunger; rights to decent, comfortable and safe housing; rights to rest and leisure; freedom of press; freedom of religion; and State support for the disabled.

==== Chapter IV: Rights of the Family ====
This chapter states that all Nicaraguan people have the rights to found a family; rights to transfer property through family inheritance; rights to marry; rights of children; rights to the protection to the process of human reproduction; and State support for the elderly.

Article 71 states that the rights of children are determined by the International Convention on Rights of Children.

==== Chapter V: Labor Rights ====
This chapter determines the Nicaraguan peoples' rights to work; rights to equal pay; rights to a safe work environment; rights to strike; rights to the development of skills; rights to choose an occupation; rights to join trade unions; limitations to work hours and the rights to rest and leisure; limitations on the employment of children, and their protection against economic and social exploitation.

==== Chapter VI: Rights of the Communities of the Atlantic Coast ====
Article 89 states that the communities of the Atlantic Coast are recognized as Nicaraguan people and have the same rights and obligations. They have the rights to self-governance and administration of local affairs according to tradition, all within national unity.

This chapter determines that the communities of the Atlantic Coast have the rights to preservation of languages, art and culture, and the development of these forms; and protection from discrimination as Nicaraguan citizens.

== Democracy Index ranking ==
Democracy Index 2020 - as published by the Economist Intelligence Unit

The Democracy Index ranking was started by the Economist Intelligence Unit (EIU) in 2006. It determines the state of democracy of 167 countries worldwide and categorizes them into the following categories according to their score: full democracy, flawed democracy, hybrid regime, authoritarian regime. Nicaragua was ranked 122nd out of 167 in 2019. The score of 3.55 categorizes the country as an authoritarian regime. This has dropped from Nicaragua's highest score of 6.07, and categorization of a flawed democracy, in 2008.

== Perspectives on human rights ==
=== Organizations and their concerns ===
In 2019, organizations including the United Nations and the Organization of American States highlighted "human rights violations" occurring in the country at the time.

==== Office of the United Nations High Commissioner for Human Rights ====
The Report of the United Nations High Commissioner for Human Rights made on the Situation of human rights in Nicaragua was published by the office in 2019 (03 Sep 2019). The main violations of human rights that the OHCHR is concerned with are the right of peaceful assembly, rights to freedom of expression and association, right to liberty, rights to freedom from torture and to humane conditions of detention, right to a fair trial, victims' right to a remedy and reparation, and the impact of the crisis on the enjoyment of economic, social and cultural rights.

According to the report, the National Police banned public demonstrations by any group starting from Sep 2018, and reverted to using excessive force against those who continued to protest. It also states that the violence shown by pro-government groups was supported by police officers.

Media workers, journalists and minority groups were continuously harassed and subject to attacks by pro-government forces. The police and other relevant authorities did not investigate these events, and made no effort to prevent them from reoccurring. Groups who demonstrated against the government were often detained and subject to torture, thus creating a violation of the human right of association.

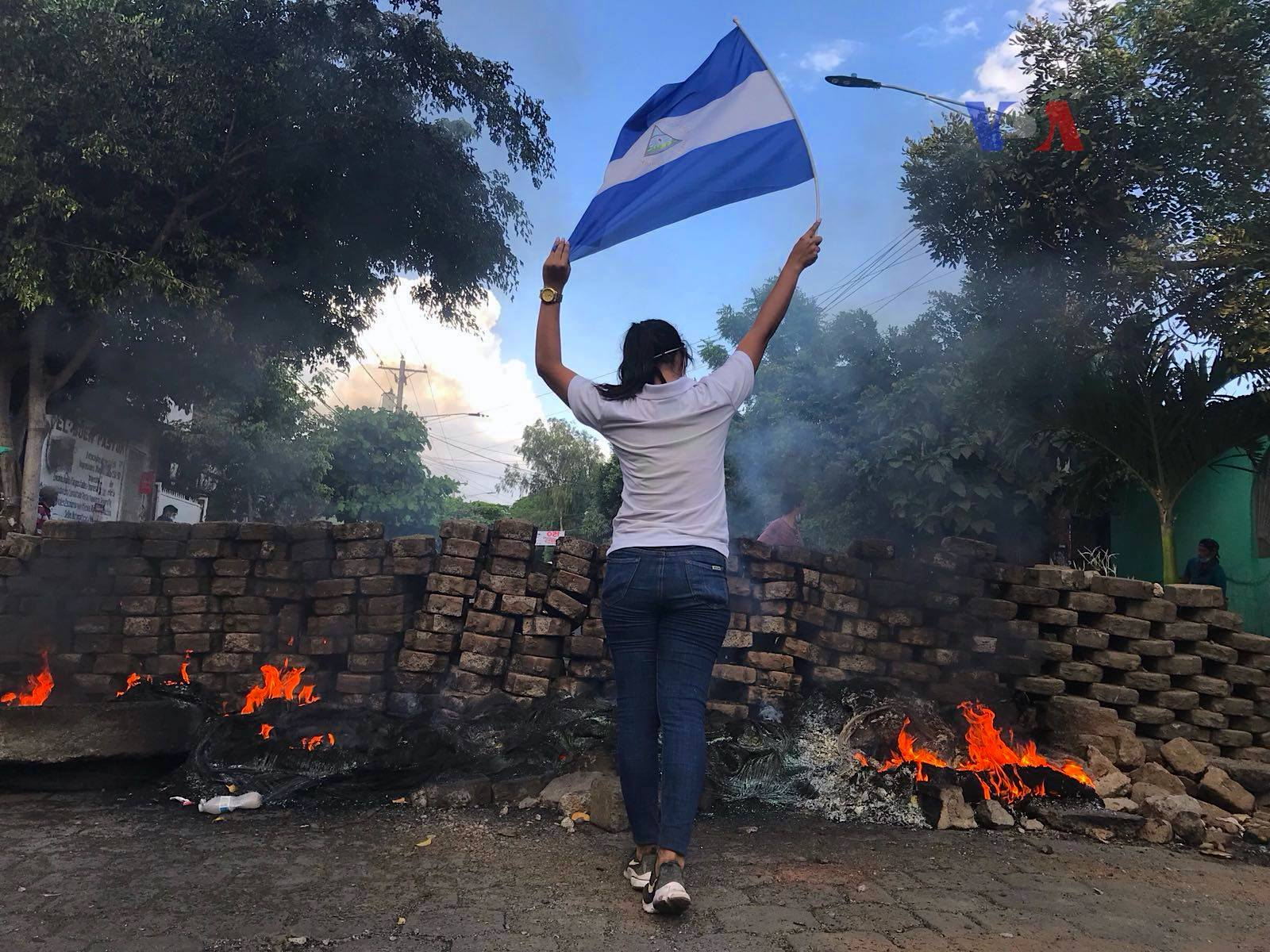
Woman holding up the Nicaraguan flag during protests in 2018

==== Organization of American States ====
The Report of the Organization of American States High-Level Commission on Nicaragua was released to the press on 19 Nov 2019. The report accuses the government of Nicaragua of denying their citizens human rights through the use of harassment and intimidation, violation of political rights, violation of the freedom of the press and expression, inhuman treatment and arbitrary detention, subordination of the state by the executive, and disruption of the Constitutional order.

The report states that the police are using intimidation tactics to silence and prevent people from speaking out about human rights violations. The National Assembly revoked political access of its citizens for criticizing the government.

The report states that the government is going against the Constitution by not guaranteeing the foundation of human rights assigned to the country's citizens within the document.

==== Human Rights Watch ====
The World Report published by the organisation in 2019 highlights various human rights violations believed to have occurred in Nicaragua during the protests. They state that the government along with the National Police began the silencing of anti-government protesters through violent means, resulting in the deaths of 324 people (Sep 2019). They also cite that human rights defenders became the targets for death threats, freedom of expression was inhibited by the National Police through raids of media offices, employees were dismissed on the grounds of political discrimination, and those detained were denied their rights to legal defenders of their choice and subjected to closed trials. The report lists these acts as "egregious abuses against critics and opponents with complete impunity".

==== Amnesty USA ====
Amnesty USA lists violence against women, freedom of expression violations, and the violation of designated sexual and reproductive rights as their main concerns for the country. Nicaragua made abortions illegal under all circumstances in 2006 and has not repealed this law despite two major attempts to do so in 2008 and 2014 under the belief that this law was unconstitutional. Amnesty USA is concerned about the correlation between this law being propagated and the increase in maternal deaths. The organisation also voices its concern over the political clash between the FSLN supporters and anti-government protesters, stating that the pro-government groups attacked protesters and were not apprehended for these demonstrations of violence. Protesters were threatened with acts of violence in order to silence their political views, and Amnesty reports that no culprits have been brought to justice under this government.

=== Media coverage ===
News on the protests and human rights violations reached a range of news media channels and publications, including BBC News, The Guardian, and Al Jazeera. Many articles focused on Daniel Ortego's role in the protests and the backlash the protesters faced. The BBC, Guardian and Al Jazeera all confirmed the reports from the listed organisations and stated that the violence was being propagated by pro-government and vigilante groups.

=== Government responses ===
Nicaragua's president, Daniel Ortega, stated that the violence in Nicaragua was caused by drug traffickers and political enemies, not by his administration. He stated that there had been a "campaign of lies ... to try to hurt the image of Nicaragua and its government". He also denied that any peaceful protests had ever been attacked.

== Socio-political context of reproductive rights ==
=== Gender norms and violence ===
Gender relations and violence in Nicaragua have been shaped by social and cultural patterns that have influenced women's lives throughout the 20th and 21st century. In the1980's the goal of the Sandinista party was to claim equality between men and women to be a revolutionary principle, but it was only ever expressed through educational and professional opportunities. It was not reflected in the efforts to challenge the culture of Machismo or the widespread tolerance of domestic violence. Prior to the 1990s, domestic violence was hardly ever discussed in public, because it was treated as a private matter or issue. As a variety of women's organizations and Casas de las Mujeres ("Houses of the Women") began to expand their work in the country, it was reported that a large amount of women and girls lacked reproductive education and health care services. In 1995, the first population-based study was performed in Leon, Nicaragua to provide an estimate of how many women and girls were experiencing physical and sexual violence by intimate partners. More than half (55%) of ever-partnered women had experienced violence from intimate partners in their life, while 27% had experienced this kind of violence within the previous 12 months of the interview.

=== Reproductive health barriers and human rights training ===
Multiple barriers have limited women's access to reproductive health in Nicaragua. Studies report that women experience stigma, shame, fear, and criticism during reproductive health services, especially involving unwanted pregnancies or sexual violence. They also described feeling judged by health care providers which discouraged them from seeking further reproductive health care services or mentioning the topic or experiences. Research from 2019 illustrates how restrictive reproductive-health policies and social norms have shaped women's access to healthcare.

Additional challenges include maintaining confidentiality in small communities where fear of negative judgment can limit women from seeking reproductive health services. Some women attribute this to machismo and unequal gender roles that limit their autonomy. One of the most important blockages to reproductive health is the lack of reproductive education which later influences intimate relationships. More data has noted that restrictive reproductive-rights laws and traditional gender dynamics can limit the efforts to resist violence against women. Unfortunately, women in Ocotal groups believe that law 779 has increased feminicide throughout the Latin American country.

In 2013, Ipas Central America (an NGO in Managua, Nicaragua) incorporated human rights education into sex-education training programs for Nicaraguan medical students. This was done in order to ensure that health care providers were protecting and promoting human rights in reproductive care. Prior to this, a very small portion of medical students felt confident responding to the violation of human rights in clinical settings. After the new training was completed, many students felt more comfortable in advocating for their patients rights. They were also more likely to know how to properly report these kinds of situations as well as their responsibility as a health care provider.

=== Long-term psychological impacts of sexual violence ===
Studies in Nicaragua have analyzed the effects of gender-based violence on the mental and emotional well-being of women and girls. In Nicaragua there are strong associations of psychological distress, such as increased suicide attempts, with experiences of violence. Women who had been sexually and/or physically abused as children had a higher chance of suicidal attempts, compared to women who did not experience early childhood violence. It has also been emphasized how these patterns demonstrate the consequences of early trauma among women who live in poverty and are vulnerable.

Psychological burdens have also been noted to be associated with gender based violence. For example, there have been reports that high rates of psychological, physical and sexual abuse contribute to poor mental health in Nicaraguan women. The experiences of violence continuously intersects with gendered power inequality and traditional societal beliefs such as machismo. Some women in Nicaragua also describe the lingering impact of being raped as minors by their family members. They also experience feelings of depression and isolation which are commonly associated with Post-traumatic stress disorder (PTSD). The increased stigma surrounding women's sexuality and pleasure are barriers to reproductive health, making the aftermath of their assault emotionally distressing. When women try to receive reproductive health services after their abuse, they are met with shame, criticism, or judgment of the sexual abuse that they have endured.

=== Development of women's organizations ===
In Nicaragua, during the revolutionary Sandinista party (1980's) women were encouraged to educate themselves and participate in economic and social development. One of their goals during this time was to promote gender equity as part of their broader agenda. In the 1990s, after the election of two conservative governments, there was a large increase in services and national media campaigns for battered women. Studies have reported the creation of about 100 centers throughout Nicaragua in order to support women who have experienced sexual violence. These centers provided educational and violence prevention programs which are usually organized by local women's organizations. Over recent years, the National Network of Women Against Violence coalition has created annual media campaigns and advocated for the creation of a law to protect the victims of domestic violence. The increased awareness of these issues has also encouraged more women to report violence to police. Advocates from these new centers also worked in accompanying women to police stations to help them fill out and register their paperwork. According to researchers, women's support also allowed the victim's report to move further through the legal process, positioning these organizations as a bridge between survivors and state institutions.

== 2021 election crackdown ==
In the months leading up to the 2021 Nicaraguan general election, President Ortega jailed seven potential challengers for the office of president. Ortega's government shut down all print newspapers in the country by blockading the supply of paper, and also raided the offices of the opposition newspaper La Prensa in August 2021.

On 7 November 2021, CNN reported that the elections have been called "a parody", "a sham", and "the worst possible conditions" for a vote. Daniel Ortega's government have been accused of blocking political participation of potential rivals and closely controlling the electoral process. Cases of misinformation and the manipulation of social networks have also emerged as another possible contaminant in the electoral process.

On 20 July 2026, President Daniel Ortega declared the country would "no longer hold elections" in the future during the official ceremony commemorating the 47th anniversary of the Sandinista Revolution, citing the need to "protect" the country from the opposition who intends to seize control of the country, and who had according to Ortega, incited the demonstrations that took place in 2018.
