= Human rights in Guatemala =

Human rights is an issue in Guatemala. The establishment of the International Commission against Impunity in Guatemala has helped the Attorney General prosecute extrajudicial killings and corruption. There remains widespread impunity for abusers from the Guatemalan Civil War, which ran from 1960 to 1996, and Human Rights Watch considers threats and violence against unionists, journalists and lawyers a major concern.

A trial for eight former Army members on charges related to the alleged disappearances of 130 people whose bodies were found among 550 at a base now run by the UN called CREOMPAZ has been stalled since it began in 2016 due to witness intimidation, among other factors.

== History ==
After an ongoing civil war which lasted over 36 years in Guatemala, the country began to transition into a more stable and established democratic country. However, political administration were being passed through the military, in which they began to engulf power over the country. That being said, following the civil war, corruption began to appear all over the country and it eventually engulfed the whole country in common crimes and chaos. In 2013, the crime rate increased to where there was roughly 6,000 homicides per year in Guatemala. These violent killings included deaths of women and children. Not to mention, groups of women and organization began to fight for their rights and security after many years of being silenced. Other cruel upbringings included discrimination towards indigenous groups, gang vandalism increasing, and an overall violation of human rights to the people of Guatemala. While Guatemala was fighting toward ending the corruption, there were many high-level government officials who were involved in organized crime. This resulted in only about 2% of the violent crimes going to trial. In 2015, President Otto Pérez Molina, Vice President Roxana Baldetti, and other high officials lost their power and were prosecuted for participation in human rights violation. Montt was convicted of the charges of genocide and was sentenced to 80–85 years in jail but this was soon over turned 10 days later. During his second trial Efrain Rios Montt died on April 1, 2018, at the age of 91.

== Injustices in Indigenous Communities (Maya) ==
After the civil war, discrimination became a common occurrence towards the indigenous communities like the Mayas. Post war, the Maya community had another battle they were fighting asking for security, residency, and human rights. Not to mention, their access to education, employment, and infrastructure is very limited. Healthcare is a very essential and vital source of living, however, for the Mayans, that is not the case. Following the war, the Maya community remained impoverished which lead to poor health outcomes. As a result, there is little to no healthcare provided for the Mayans. From the civil war to modern day Guatemala, the Maya communities are left alone as they are excluded from the country and government, in which they suffer from discrimination, racism, and structural violence.

== Gender ==
Fourteen women were found victims of sexual abuse by two military officers and sentenced to prison. The two officers both have prior criminal history, one with triple homicide with three women and the other is responsible for the disappearance of the husband's to his female victims . That is just one of the many female homicides that occur in Guatemala. Females in Guatemala are high danger as they become easy target for any men in high power, whether is government officials, military officials, or drug trafficking. As the population of female is increasing, the homicide rate have also increased greatly with women of ages 16–30 are the victims. In addition, the country's constitution does not protect LGBT rights and a bill proposed in 2017 bans students from learning about other sexual orientations and also bans same sex marriage.

== Legal issues ==
According to the International Human Rights Law Group, the Guatemalan criminal justice system is to blame for the poor human rights Guatemala faces. Cerezo announced it would now be their responsibility. The Guatemalan criminal justice system is supposed to work with the court to punish those who violate human rights. However, the system is no longer the only ones working to "cleanse" the country. The public has also began to get involved, but much worse. They have taken the phrase "social cleaning" to another level where high levels of violence are present everywhere in Guatemala with attacks on human rights defenders, violence against women, discrimination towards indigenous communities. With a system implemented to protect human rights in Guatemala the issue of these rights being violated remains. This is partly because the judges are not trained properly which can affect the investigation by causing them to be unreliable. The Commission against Impunity in Guatemala (CICIG) was established in 2007 and itworks to break down corruption within the country. After a CICIG investigation the 2015 president, Cerezo collected bribes he was later arrested. Human rights violations continue to increase with the Guatemalan people as victims because of improper protections from the government. As a result of the many violations, narcotics has become a common occurrence with many kidnappings, human trafficking, and criminal activities, that have not been stopped due to the corruption of government security and communal leaders rising and gaining power.

On 16 May 2022, Alejandro Giammattei reappointed María Consuelo Porras as attorney general, to serve for another four years. The decision posed a serious risk to human rights and the rule of law in the country. During her initial years in office, Porras has undermined investigations into corruption and human rights abuses, and brought arbitrary criminal proceedings against journalists, judges, and prosecutors.

== Solutions ==
International Commission against Impunity in Guatemala organization was first established on December 12, 2005. After years of human rights violation in Guatemala, government officials began leading towards creating an established organization that would investigate the many variety of cases that were left unsolved. After getting the assistance from the United Nations, the government of Guatemala formulated an organization called Commission of Investigation of Illegal Bodies and Clandestine Security Apparatuses (CICIACS). The creation of this organization was to combat all forms of corruption and crime impacting the country. However, this caused a controversy in Guatemala, which resulted in it being denied because the ruling deemed it to be a violation of the exclusive constitutional delegation of power to the Public Ministry. After being denied the government of Guatemala revised the document and the regulation of the CICIACS to eliminate all the unconstitutional issues that were brought to their attention from the constitutional court. When they were finished they re-introduced the proposition to the court and after the review the Constitutional court approved it. They renamed it International Commission against Impunity in Guatemala (CICIG). The government of Guatemala and the United Nations signed it into order on December 12, 2005. Nonetheless, International Labor Organization Convention No. 169 gives the indigenous peoples the right to approve or disapprove of natural resource development projects that may affect them since they live in rural areas that are sometimes of interest to many project developers.
