= Human rights in Panama =

Human Rights in Panama include many ongoing concerns and changes. In recent years, Panama has posted notable improvements to its human rights record. It has committed to respect and protect human rights according to international standards as part of its obligations as a member of the United Nations and the Organization of American States (OAS). Like many countries around the world, however, cases of human rights abuses still remain a topic of international concern.

== Background ==
Panama is considered the fourth oldest democracy in South America. Political scientists such as Carlos Guevarra Mann have recognized the nascent political stability of the country, rating the current era of constitutional government as significantly better than the dictatorial regime it replaced, which lasted for more than two decades. The poor human rights record of Panama during the military dictatorship was highlighted during a fact-finding tour led by US Senator Robert Byrd. This delegation, which negotiated treaties involving Panama Canal, secured a Statement of Understanding with General Omar Torrijos that included his government's pledge to improve the human rights condition in the country. This addressed issues such as the right of due process and freedom of the press. The treaties gave Panama full sovereign governance over the Panama Canal.

One of the developments after the transition to civilian government was the dissolution of Panama's army. It was replaced by the National Police and other law enforcement agencies during the early 1990s. As these law enforcement agencies came to be supervised by civilian officials, the development was credited as a major contributor to the decline of human rights violations in the country. However, there is still impunity among security forces due to the weakness in the mechanisms of internal control for conduct and enforcement. A report, for instance, cited that although Panama established the Office of the Human Rights Ombudsman, it has moral but no legal authority.

== Censorship ==
A recurring human rights problem in Panama involves the limitations to the freedom of the press. Although the Panamanian constitution guarantees this right, there are still incidents of harassment of media organizations and journalists. It is noted that the constitutional guarantee did not prevent the enactment of laws that allow for the prosecution of journalists for vaguely defined offenses such as the publication of private information and for leaking government information. Human rights organizations such as the Inter-American Commission on Human Rights, Inter-American Press Association, Reporters Without Borders, and other groups have all criticized Panama's history of censorship.

The government also has a history of resorting to legal actions designed to intimidate and restrict the ability to report news freely. By March 1999, Panama received international condemnation for using gag laws to limit press freedom and to punish journalists. In 2012, a bill in the National Assembly sought to penalize speech that criticizes the president and his administration. It was withdrawn after debate. About 82 percent of local journalists consider freedom of expression restricted by threats and pressures from government officials.

Harassment against journalists were also widely reported. The newspaper La Prensa, its investigative unit, and its reporter Santiago Cumbrera all received threats after publishing irregularities in the Ministry of Labor and the National Land Authority. Other examples include the case of the newspaper editor Gustavo Gorriti, who was stripped of his work permit after he published reports on corruption and political scandals. The government only reversed itself on Gorriti's permit revocation after considerable international criticism. The killing of Dario Fernandez, the owner and program director of the radio station Radio Mi Favorita and a vocal critic of President Ricardo Martinelli, has also not been resolved.

Even members of foreign media were at risk of harassment and incarceration. The government, for instance, arrested and deported foreign journalists who were investigating corruption in Panama such as Paco Gomez Nadal and Pilar Chato.

== Domestic violence ==
In 2021, the Panamanian Public Ministry reported 13,013 cases of domestic violence and these include 16 cases of femicides and 12 attempted femicides. Panama has taken steps to address the problem such as the passage of a new law in 2013 addressing violence against women. This was further updated by the Law No. 202, which was passed in 2021. The problem, however, is still a recurring issue due to obstacles such as fear of reprisal, lack of awareness, and societal stigma, which prevent victims from reporting abuse. There were also few convictions for domestic violence, except for cases that involve death.

== Other human rights concerns ==
According to the U.S. State Department, other human rights issues in Panama in recent years include: torture and other forms of inhuman punishments; harsh prison conditions; and corruption in the judicial system. Although women enjoy the same legal status as men, weak law enforcement of discrimination based on gender still persists.

The treatment of the indigenous communities in Panama is another lingering human rights problem in the country. In 2023, two UN bodies found that the country failed to meet its obligations to protect the rights of indigenous peoples. These included the failure to ensure their territorial rights as well as the right to free, prior, and informed consent (FPIC), and the right to maintain their traditions and culture.
