= Human rights in Asia =

The topic of human rights in Asia is one that encompasses an immense number of states, international governmental organizations, and non-governmental organizations. All these institutions contribute a variety of services and perspectives towards human rights, covering topics including the enforcement, monitoring, and criticisms of human rights in Asia. There is no single body that covers all of human rights in Asia, as such a diverse and widespread region requires a number of institutions to properly monitor the multitude of elements that fall under the scope of human rights. There have historically been numerous criticisms of human rights in Asia, but a variety of new treaties and conventions now strive to accomplish a level of human rights as they are known on the international stage. Human rights in Asia are monitored by many organizations (both governmental and non-governmental), a few examples being the ASEAN Intergovernmental Commission on Human Rights (AICHR) and Human Rights Watch. Tolerance of these organizations varies from state to state, with voluntary intergovernmental programs (i.e. ASEAN) often seeing more state-cooperation than neutral non-governmental organizations would typically receive. The number of criticisms towards Asian states has dramatically increased in recent decades, with many human rights advocates calling for increased transparency and greater international pressure upon Asian states to refrain from any human rights infractions. Aforementioned calls for international pressure have gone unanswered, however, as most of the international community finds it increasingly difficult to challenge the actions of the growing Asian powers: particularly China. While states have put forward somewhat muted complaints in recent years, non-governmental organizations continue to 'name and shame' states that have shown themselves to be guilty of human rights infractions.

== History of human rights in Asia ==
=== Southeast Asia ===
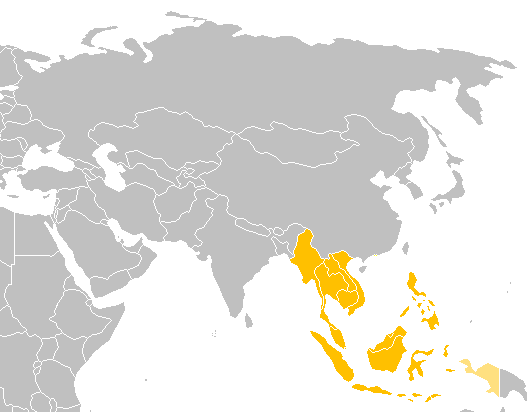
Southeast Asian Region

Southeast Asia has historically not adopted the same definition of human rights that could be found in Western European or North American countries. The first sign of human rights recognition came in the form of the Universal Declaration of Human Rights (UDHR) put forward by the United Nations. This declaration, however, was not binding and therefore not enforced. The UDHR had only 51 states worldwide ratify its existence (those who were members of the United Nations); many of the Southeast Asian countries had not yet acquired membership. This primarily Western-based notion of human rights had by no means permeated Southeast Asia; instead, the ideological opposite of human rights was true: there were no expectations of equal treatment based upon socioeconomic, cultural, religious, etc. status.

The Philippines, the first nation in Asia to form a republic, experienced a long struggle for instituting democratic ideals. In the 1970s, it contested the Ferdinand Marcos dictatorship, which was eventually ousted through a bloodless People Power Revolution in 1986. Numerous human rights victims suffered under the administration, and in 1983, one of the first Southeast Asian organizations called the Regional Council on Human Rights in Asia formalized the first regional declaration on human rights called the Declaration of the Basic Duties of ASEAN Peoples and Governments. The nongovernment organization was composed of established Southeast Asian human rights lawyers led by the father of Philippine human rights Sen. Jose W. Diokno, who was the founder of the largest human rights law firm called the Free Legal Assistance Group (FLAG). The declaration was signed on December 9, 1983, in Manila. In the 21st century, the nation faces a war on drugs under the 16th President Rodrigo Duterte, who has threatened to declare martial law, similar to Ferdinand Marcos. Time Person of the Year Maria Ressa of Rappler was later charged with libel for her reports on the Duterte administration.

In Singapore, certain fundamental freedoms are still restricted such as the freedom of assembly. Meetings of any kind are still heavily regulated, requiring a police permit for gatherings of 1 individual or more. Public gatherings for any cause are further restricted by the Singapore government, with many events in recent history being shut down under the pretense of the 'Public Order Act'. Singapore also regularly rejects applications for police permits to gather for assemblies "directed towards a political end". Singapore has retained and employed the death penalty numerous time throughout history, especially in drug related criminal cases. Executions often take place relatively quickly after conviction and almost never have any transparency. Singapore's LGBTQ community has seen heavy restrictions throughout history, such as the long-standing policy of criminalizing same-sex relations – a policy that remained in place until 2022.

Indonesia has a long history of committing numerous human rights infractions that have gone unpunished. Numerous members of the Indonesian security forces have been found responsible for human rights violations including rape, beatings, unlawful detention, etc. but have not been brought to justice. Indonesia's media, while officially deemed 'free press', suffers from intimidation tactics employed by powerful government or business figures. Numerous journalists have been jailed under supposed violations of various criminal and civil defamation laws. Religious freedom has been an issue of Indonesia for numerous years, despite its constitution dictating complete religious freedom/tolerance. Legal restrictions upon any religion except the 6 sanctioned state religions have existed in Indonesia for decades and are not expected to be lifted any time soon. Labor laws in Indonesia continue to be harsh, with hundreds of thousands of girls in Indonesia being subjected to involuntary labor. These children are often prohibited from leaving their places of employment and are often abused physically, psychologically, and sexually. The Human Rights Watch in early May 2020 urged the Indonesian government to immediately release at least 70 Papuan and Moluccan activists. They were arrested during a peaceful protest against the government. HRW also requested the government to ensure freedom of expression in the eastern province of Indonesia in line with the 2018 court ruling.

=== Central Asia ===
Human rights in Central Asia have received less attention from media in recent years following the outbreak of conflict with Western powers than previous decades, but that is not to say that they are completely overlooked on the international stage by international governmental organizations or non-governmental organizations. Local interest in the adoption and upholding of human rights has also been relatively minimal, with proposed international governmental organizations (IGOs) such as the Central Asian Union (CAU) choosing to focus on other issues such as security, economic development, and cultural permeation.

Central Asia

Central Asia has many human rights issues that plague the lives of its citizens. For example, Human Rights Watch has compiled numerous reports with aims of drawing attention to the fact that Afghanistan remains in a state of conflict, seeing citizen death tolls either stay high or slowly grow; general safety of citizens is an uncertainty in Afghanistan, with human rights violations including torture, unlawful detainment, etc. by the government and other groups also going unchecked. These human rights violations have existed in Afghanistan throughout recent history and continue to exist today. Furthermore, numerous cases of sexual assault can be found throughout Afghanistan but often receive very little (if any) attention from the government; in fact, the opposite is true: the Afghan government often orders the performance of "virginity checks" upon women which essentially entails governmental sanctioned sexual assault or humiliation.

Looking specifically at Kyrgyzstan, Human Rights Watch reported very few improvements to human rights in 2017 within the state, with the government acknowledging issues such as torture as an issue but doing nothing proactive to combat them. Human rights violations such as torture are considered to be de facto interrogation tools and are likely employed by the government and its police forces. Authorities in Kyrgyzstan registered 199 complaints of torture in 2015, with only 34 cases actually ever being looked into. Other questionable Kyrgyz actions have included the mid-June proposal of a foreign media blackout to avoid bad international coverage; these constitutional amendments were heavily condemned by both domestic and international journalists.

Kazakhstan is another Central Asian country that has had issues in recent history with human rights violations. Human Rights Watch condemned the Kazakhstan government for the detainment and jailing of peaceful protesters in 2016, with other violations such as restriction of movement and torture also being suspected following detention. Land claim protests are of particular prevalence as of late, with peaceful protests resulting in violent conflict between activists and government forces. The Kazakhstan government has justified said violent reactions by pointing to domestic laws striking freedom of association and assembly from their citizens' human rights, but said revocations of rights has been subjected to heavy criticism by the United Nations, European Union, and Human Rights Watch.

Other Central Asian countries share both similar situations regarding human rights violations and a lack of movement to rectify said violations.

=== South Asia ===
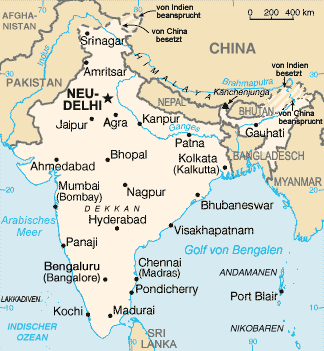
South Asian Region

South Asia includes Bangladesh, Bhutan, India, Maldives, Nepal, Pakistan, and Sri Lanka – each state having varying degrees of effective human rights policies and/or goals. This region of Asia has seen some dramatic improvements regarding human rights in past years but still has room to improve, especially in human rights genres such as children's rights or women's rights. Some improvements in recent years have included a number of pacts and declarations to combat the world's highest children marriage rate in Bangladesh. Numerous cases of stalking, sexual assault, and rape have persisted in Bangladesh in recent years and the number of cases reported have continued to increase annually. Sexual and gender orientation has taken strides forwards in Southern Asia recently, seeing the official recognition of a third gender for Hijras come into effect; policy regarding this third gender, homosexual relationships, etc. has remained somewhat stagnant however, seeing relatively slow implementation of existing goals and the slowing of upcoming rules or regulations. Enforced or involuntary disappearances also continue to be an issue in Southern Asia, with United Nations requests for investigation being continually denied and Human Rights Watch statements simply being ignored.

One of the most prominent and long-lasting issues for Southern Asia, particularly Bangladesh, is the problem of arsenic in drinking water. The World Health Organization (WHO) have stated an estimated 40 million people have been poisoned in Bangladesh alone and that local governments have taken few (if any) steps to rectify the problem. The arsenic is thought to come from water filtering through arsenic-rich rocks and local mining activity; the latter of the reasons is difficult to show, however, due to the refusal of Bangladesh to sanction any kind of investigation into the matter.

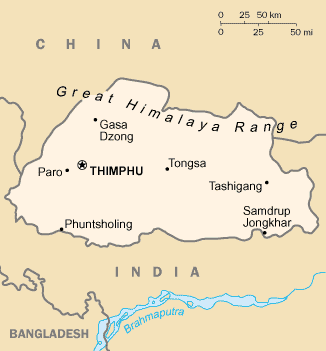
Bhutan

Bhutan is one of the region's leading human rights advocates, adopting numerous pro-human rights policies and regulations in the past years. Bhutan has officially committed itself to the "enjoyment of all human rights" and has shown progress in recent history via a skyrocketing gross national happiness (GNH) rating. The GNH rating is a scale which most experts see as increasingly relevant to gauging success within a country and general citizen happiness. The GNH replaces the standard measurement, gross domestic product (GDP), and its adoption has been considered by many developed nations including Canada and Japan. While Bhutan has taken steps to rectify historical divisions within the country's population, a clear political inequality remains in Bhutan, rendering some citizens unable to exercise fundamental rights such as freedom of movement or freedom of association.

India finds itself as one of the leading economic powers of the region, but still is plagued with numerous human rights issues and violations. India has had numerous issues with rape and sexual assault in past years, particular against women and children. The government has condemned these acts but has taken very few steps to truly combat said issues and as a result, they still remain immensely prevalent in Indian society today. Despite policies aimed at helping victims of rape or sexual assault being implemented, victims still face immense shame at hospitals or police stations; it is assumed that while the number of cases is already extremely high, there are many more unreported instances due simply to the potential of humiliation. There are also instances of religious violence in India.

Pakistan is potentially the most volatile country in Southern Asia, seeing citizen-targeting terror attacks stemming from racially or politically motivated conflicts bring about high civilian casualties. Following the appearance of terror groups such as Al Qaeda and Lashkar-e-Omar, bombings of hospitals, educational facilities, government buildings, etc. became common occurrences, each attack claiming an increasing number of civilian lives. Enforced disappearances and the use of child soldiers have also seen frequent use through recent years, both of which have received immense international condemnation. The government has taken few steps to fix many of these human rights issues, due both to a lack of motivation and lack of resources. Abuses of women remained a prominent issue for Pakistan in recent decades, seeing instances of rape, sexual assault, forced marriage, etc. rampant throughout the country. Religious minorities in Pakistan have continued to suffer greatly from both terror organizations and the government itself, falling prey to religious policies specifically aiming to eradicate cultural/religious minorities and immense violence by terror groups and government forces alike. Immense fighting in the country brought the creation of millions of refugees; most of which have yet to permanently settle due to the instability of the region.

=== North Asia ===
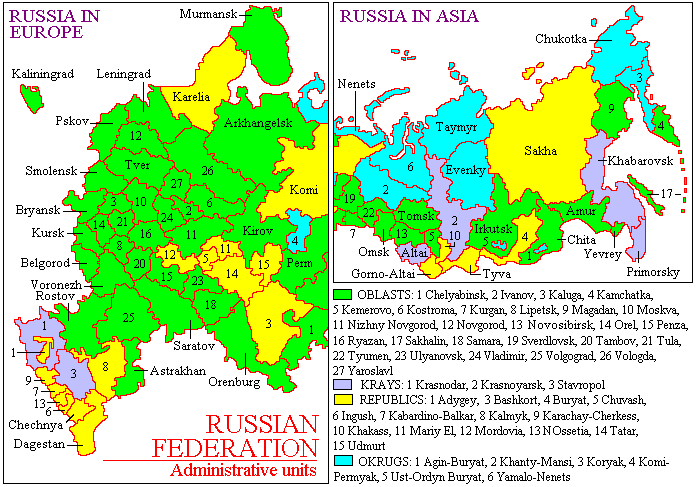
European and Asian part of Russia

Several reports shows indigenous population in Siberia and Russian Far East are under various human rights violations by Russian authorities.

=== East Asia ===
East Asia is home to many countries that have dominated the international community's attention in recent years. Human rights conditions in many East Asian countries have been the subjects of numerous debates at the international level given the notable international actors which are being examined (i.e. China, Japan, etc.). The varying types of governments found in Eastern Asia have affected their respective countries' transparency regarding human rights; furthermore, these Eastern Asian countries have varying levels of human rights, with some states choosing to uphold the strictest human rights issues while others sanction numerous human rights violations and atrocities.

China

In China being such a significant economic and political power on the international stage, naturally their human rights record has been called into question by the international community and numerous non-governmental organizations. After Xi Jinping became general secretary of the Chinese Communist Party in 2012, human rights in China have worsened. China has historically been harsh with its critics and this trend has continued in recent history, and enforced disappearances remain a widespread occurrence across China. China has also held the title for the most annual executions in recent years; while official statistics remain state secrets, China still has 46 crimes punishable by death. The Chinese government has claimed that the number of executions has fallen by 60%, seeing only a few thousand executed every year, but there is no credible way to verify these statistics. General living conditions have improved in recent years, with China successfully lifting millions of people out of poverty and allowing them to meet their basic needs. Women's rights remain somewhat basic in China but the international community has pushed the Chinese government to adopt improved rights, especially regarding women's rights within the Chinese judiciary system which as of 2013, was slated on the Chinese legislative agenda for the first time as point of discussion. China also received international criticism for Xinjiang re-education camps and other human rights abuses against Hui people and other ethnic and religious minority groups. While there has historically been suspicion of torture in China, the general attitude towards torture has shifted in recent years; the Chinese government now openly opposes torture and punishes those who partake in it. Regarding the suspicion of torture carried out by the government itself, there have been no official admissions of torture in recent years. In addition, China has adopted various anti-torture laws to ensure that confessions obtained via torture are not considered admissible in the judiciary system.

Japan has held its human rights record in immensely high standing, strictly observing basic freedoms such the freedom of assembly, association, and expression. Domestic nationals have in recent history been protected by a strict set of codified working laws in Japan and enjoy a wide variety of workplace rights and freedoms to ensure safety and fair working conditions. The same, however, cannot be said for migrant workers from China and Korea; these foreign workers have historically had no real legislation protecting their working conditions and often fall prey to poorer working conditions and lesser wages. Migrant workers also suffer from other rights infractions, including the prevention of free movement, the prohibition of free communication (i.e. via cellphone, landline, etc.), etc. Japan has historically not had any anti-discrimination laws due to a lack of evidence of any consistent discrimination within the country; this, however, changed in 2017 with the adoption of an anti-hate speech law following the provision of evidence showing a growing anti-Korean sentiment within Japan. One of Japan's most notable human rights violations over the last decades was the provision of comfort women for their military services, namely before and during the Second World War. Most of these comfort women were not Japanese nationals, but in fact Korean or Chinese civilians who were systematically abducted from their homes during the Japanese occupation. These women suffered countless instances of sexual assault and rape. Japan has repeatedly denied the existence of comfort women since. In addition, the Japanese army during World War 2 committed various war crimes across Asia and the pacific. Some famous examples of Japanese war crimes include the Rape of Nanjing, the Manilla Massacre, the Sook Ching Massacre and the Bataan Death March. Japan has continued their usage of the death penalty in recent years, executing 2 prisoners in 2017 by hanging following their convictions.

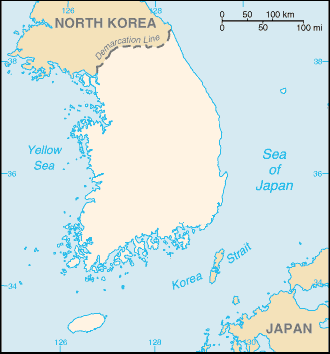
South Korea

South Korea has many civil and political liberties, enjoying a vibrant and relatively liberal society. There have been some instances of the government using outdated laws as a means of detaining those who criticize the government, but these cases are somewhat rare. South Korea is relatively intolerant of the LGBTQ community and has seen numerous cases of discrimination in recent years in numerous arenas, ranging from the judicial system to corporate board rooms. Women in South Korea do not enjoy the same civil liberties as women in European or North American states, instead being pushed into traditional housewife and caretaker roles by their partners. Women have also been fined up to 2 million won when found to have had an abortion without their husband's consent. South Korea also has left their policies regarding North Korea active, meaning any citizen found to be spreading positive North Korean 'propaganda' can be jailed for up to one year.

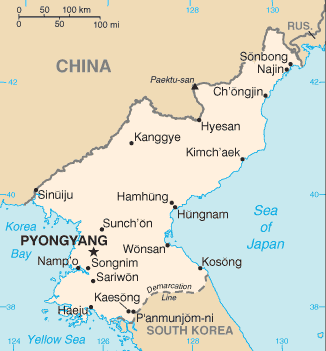
North Korea

Mongolia has suffered from a poor record of human rights throughout history, seeing numerous cases of torture and assault on the part of both the government and individuals. Mongolia abolished the death penalty in 2017, but it has since been proposed to reintegrate the death penalty into the judicial system by the newly elected president. Mongolia has also seen a high number of domestic abuse cases in recent decades and has taken no real steps to rectify the situation. Mongolia is also the home to a number of migrant workers; these workers have yet to be officially recognized by the Mongolian government and therefore have been given no official rights.

North Korea has been and continues to be the home of some of the world's worst human rights conditions. Numerous reports documenting appalling human rights violations have been compiled by North Korean defectors, outside NGOs, etc. North Korea has been accused of a number of human rights violations including extermination, murder, enslavement, torture, imprisonment, rape and other forms of sexual violence, and forced abortion. North Korea has also restricted all basic civil and political liberties for its citizens, including any kind of freedom of movement or association while also providing no forums for political input. Women in North Korea continue to face a wide range of abuses including non-criminalized marital rape, forced marriage, and sexual torture; these acts are undertaken by both the government and other family members (typically husbands, fathers, etc.). North Korean prison facilities have also historically provided some of the worst living conditions in the world, likely being the cause of hundreds of thousands of deaths of recent decades. These prison camps house mainly political prisoners and typically entail harsh labor, regular torture, violent sexual assault and/or rape, and other human rights violations. North Korea has fallen under harsh criticisms from the international community for years and their abominable human rights records remains a regular topic of conversation within the UN Security Council as a potential threat to global peace and security.

== Monitoring and regulatory institutions ==
As the Asian region is home to a plethora of states each with varying degrees of human rights standards and general values or cultures, it comes as no surprise that Asia does not share one central authority regarding human rights.

=== Universal Declaration of Human Rights ===
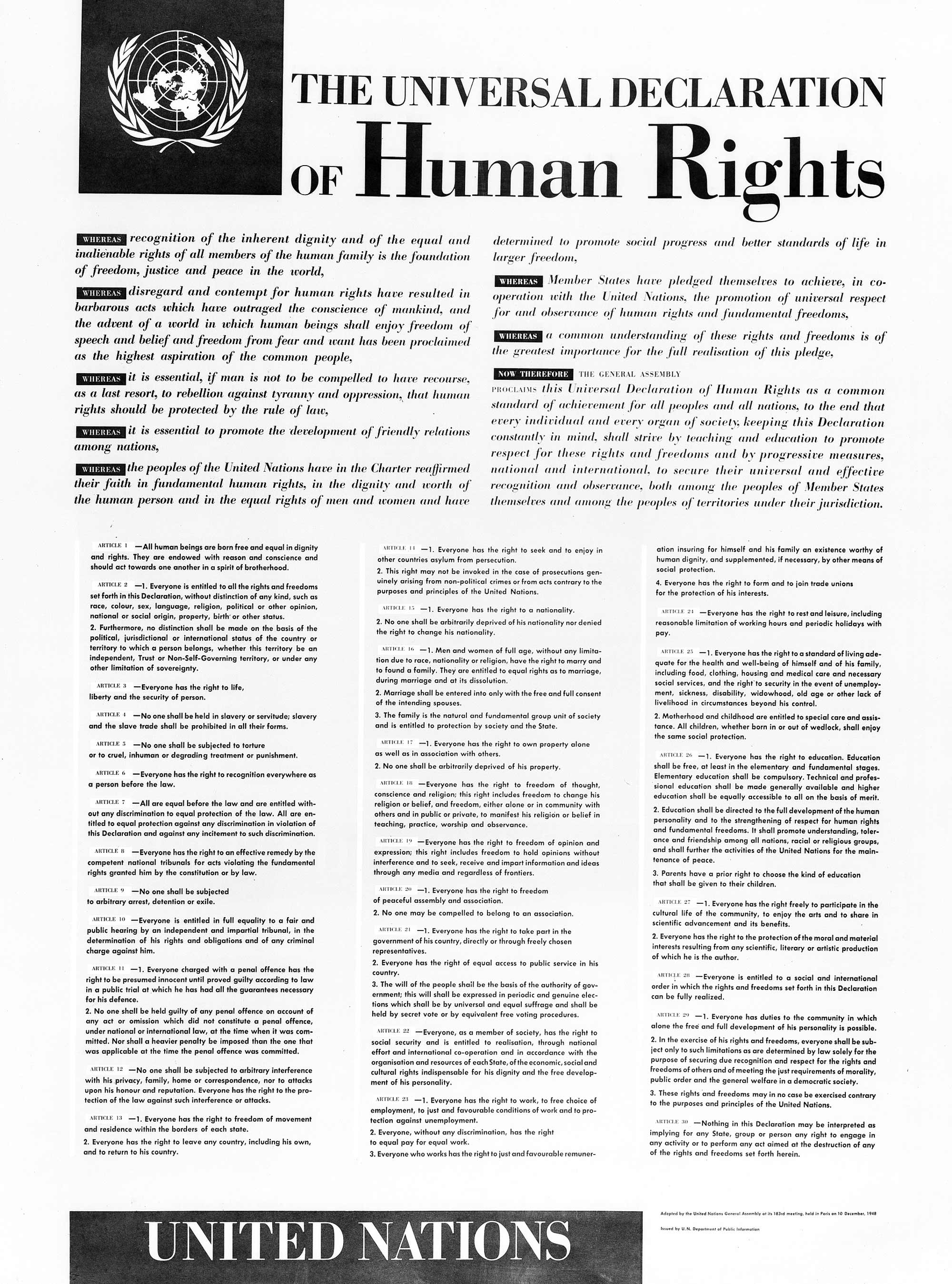
Universal Declaration of Human Rights

While a number of countries within today's greater Asian region were not members of the United Nations at the time it passed the Universal Declaration of Human Rights, most of those who were chose to vote in favor of it (i.e. Afghanistan, Pakistan, India). This declaration has 30 articles all pertaining to various facets of human rights; for example:

- Article 1: All human beings are born free and equal in dignity and rights. They are endowed with reason and conscience and should act towards one another in a spirit of brotherhood.
- Article 9: No one shall be subjected to arbitrary arrest, detention or exile.
- Article 19: Everyone has the right to freedom of opinion and expression; this right includes freedom to hold opinions without interference and to seek, receive and impart information and ideas through any media and regardless of frontiers.

The UDHR was created in hopes of establishing a standard of living for people around the world, ensuring humane conditions for people regardless of their state. The UDHR is still considered the central authority regarding human rights, though it holds no binding power over states and therefore is still regularly ignored by numerous states when alternatives better serve state-interests.

=== ASEAN Human Rights Declaration ===
As mentioned above, the Association of Southeast Asian Nations (ASEAN) can be considered the most established socio-economic regional organization in Asia. ASEAN operates solely in South East Asia, with member states including Indonesia, Thailand, Vietnam, Singapore, Malaysia, Philippines, Cambodia, Myanmar, Brunei, and Laos. While ASEAN initially focused on economic development in South East Asia, it has recently started to expand its scope of operation into other areas of South East Asian society (i.e. human rights). In 2009, ASEAN formed the ASEAN Intergovernmental Commission on Human Rights hoping it would assist in the promotion and regulation of human rights conditions in the region. The commission created and later unanimously adopted the newly drafted ASEAN Human Rights Declaration in November 2012 which called for basic and fundamental rights for all citizens in Southeast Asia. The declaration has 40 articles which include:

- Article 3: Every person has the right of recognition everywhere as a person before the law. Every person is equal before the law. Every person is entitled without discrimination to equal protection of the law.
- Article 11: Every person has an inherent right to life which shall be protected by law. No person shall be deprived of life save in accordance with law.
- Article 22: Every person has the right to freedom of thought, conscience and religion. All forms of intolerance, discrimination and incitement of hatred based on religion and beliefs shall be eliminated.
- Article 33: ASEAN Member States should take steps, individually and through regional and international assistance and cooperation, especially economic and technical, to the maximum of its available resources, with a view to achieving progressively the full realization of economic, social and cultural rights recognized in this Declaration.

While the ASEAN Human Rights Declaration has been ratified by all ASEAN member states, there is still evidence of human rights transgressions in the region despite codified laws against said actions existing. The very existence of this declaration, however, shows progress regarding the acknowledgement of basic human rights in a region that traditionally expressed no interest in recognizing human rights regulations.

=== Center for Economic and Social Rights ===
The Center for Economic and Social Rights (CESR) focuses on a collection of rights, including political rights, economic rights, social rights, etc. The CESR works throughout the entirety of Asia, often cooperating with the Asia Pacific Forum (APF) when working of improving rights situations in regions where the CESR does not have an established presence. The CESR opts to improve human rights conditions and regulations throughout Asia by supporting National Human Rights Institutions (NHRIs). Rather than attempting to enact change as an international actor, CESR and APF provide a variety of services and support options to NHRIs across Asia under the pretense that these domestic National Human Rights Institutions will be able to push for change much more efficiently than an international organization would. Some benefits to National Human Rights Institutions include:

- NHRIs have a legally defined relationship with the state, which gives them authority to monitor compliance with international human rights norms
- NHRIs rely on a broader set of advocacy tools than the judiciary or civil society groups as well as a quasi-judicial competence to receive complaints and scrutinize law and practice; they provide advice, assistance and capacity building to government
- Uniquely positioned between government, civil society and the UN human rights system, NHRIs can bring together various governmental and non-governmental actors
- As permanent institutions, NHRIs are able to track issues over extended periods to identify trends in the level of rights fulfillment

=== Association for Human Rights in Central Asia ===
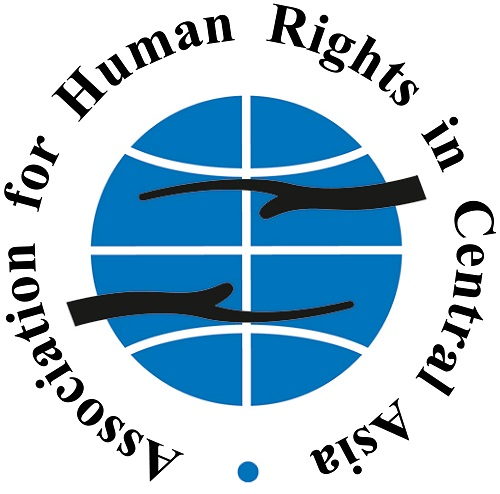

The Association for Human Rights in Central Asia (AHRCA) is a French independent human rights organization founded in 2006. This association focuses primarily on human rights monitoring, reporting on numerous human rights infraction including torture, abysmal working conditions, LGBTQ restrictions, media repression, etc. The AHRCA monitors states that lie within Central Asia, including Kazakhstan, Kyrgyzstan, Tajikistan, Turkmenistan, and Uzbekistan. Rather than enacting change themselves, AHRCA heavily relies upon international rights mechanisms to bring change to Central Asia. The AHRCA focuses include but are not limited to:

- Protection against torture
- Support for political prisoners
- Protection of Refugees
- Freedom of Religion

Recent activist initiatives include the AHRCA calling for an international boycott of Uzbek cotton as it relies heavily upon compulsory child labor when harvested.

=== Human Rights Watch (HRW) ===

Human Rights Watch (HRW) is widely regarded as one of the world's most reliable nongovernmental human rights organizations. HRW was established in 1978 and monitors countries around the globe, publishing more than 100 annual reports and generating extensive media coverage of human rights infractions. Furthermore, HRW meets regularly with state governments and intergovernmental organizations (i.e. the United Nations, European Union, African Union, etc.) to provide policy advice, briefings, etc. Aside from the extensive monitoring HRW published annually, the organization also focuses heavily on facilitating change in the regions they work within. For example, HRW actively organizes and covers protests or activist movements against a wide variety of issues (i.e. garbage burning in Lebanon). HRW has been involved in the Asian region for numerous years, regularly releasing various reports and criticisms on every Asian country. These reports focus on a number of issues, including fundamental freedoms, women's rights, child labor, etc.

=== European Union ===
The European Union Flag

In addition to the previously mentioned regional governmental institutions and non-governmental organizations that contribute to East Asian human rights regulation and oversight, the European Union (EU) has played an active role in recent years. Whilst the EU has previously not been expected to intervene in East Asian human rights questions, the institution's commitment to the Global Human Rights Sanctions Regulation Agreement expanded EU jurisdiction to cover global human rights violations, including those that transpire within East Asia. Initial draftings of this regulatory framework began on December 9, 2019. On November 17, 2020, the European Council formally established the Agreement. The framework is specifically committed to "developing a new horizontal EU global human rights sanctions regime to tackle serious human rights violations and abuses worldwide". The EU has been monitoring East Asian human rights development for several years now, as demonstrated by the issuance of several public statements condemning countries for committing violations. One of the earliest statements dates back to 2009 when the EU publicly scrutinized the Chinese government for executing nine Christian citizens. Despite the novelty of its active engagement with East Asian human rights oversight, the EU's most substantial efforts can be recognized with regard to the ongoing anti-Uighur violence that is occurring in the Xinjiang province of China. In February 2020, the EU issued a statement arguing that China's Chen Mingguo is responsible for “arbitrary detentions and degrading treatment inflicted upon Uighurs and people from other Muslim ethnic minorities, as well as systematic violations of their freedom of religion or belief”. In addition to these accusations, the EU orchestrated a variety of travel bans and asset freezes within Xinjiang's operational borders, thus demonstrating the effectuation of tangible, policy-based sanctions in the face of East Asian human rights violations.

== Significant human rights violations ==
=== 2005 Andijan unrest ===
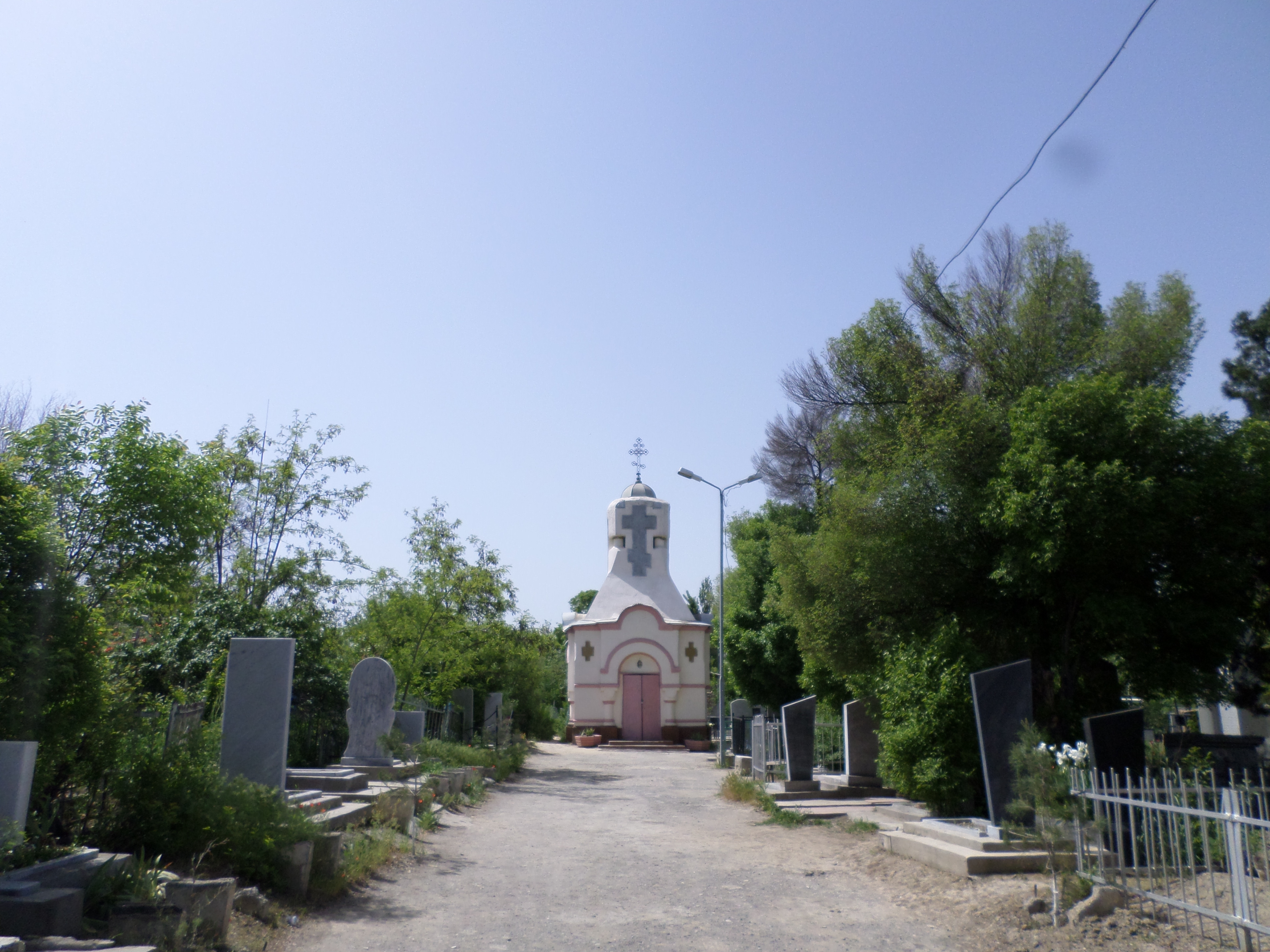
Andijan Chapel

The 2005 Andijan Unrest human rights violation took place in Uzbekistan and is one of the worst mass civilian executions in recent history, seeing civilian death tolls estimated to be between 200 and upwards of 1500. This human rights violation was prompted by the government's reluctance to release 23 local businessmen who had been charged with extremism, fundamentalism, and separatism. A small militia group gathered outside of the prison where these businessmen were being held and broke them out in the early hours of the morning, killing a number of prison guards and holding various government officials captive. Uzbek citizens took to the streets in support of this prison break, occupying Babar Square to protest governmental corruption, unjust judiciary systems, etc. Government forces blocked all roads to the square in hopes to contain the protest, but many simply walked past military forces on foot and joined the protest. There were early reports of gunfire exchanged between civilians and military forces, but the protesters in the Babar Square were not deterred and remained in the same location. Between 5pm – 6pm, the government initiated a large offensive upon the Babar Square without any warning. The Uzbek armed forces used sniper rifles, assault rifles, and armed personnel carriers (APCs) against the protesting civilians, indiscriminately firing upon men, women, and children alike. There were later reports of armed forces systemically executing immobile injured civilians and moving hundreds of bodies into mass graves. Despite the government claiming it took action solely against supposed terror groups embedded within the protest, Uzbekistan came under heavy international criticism following the Andijan massacre.

=== Khmer Rouge genocide ===
The Khmer Rouge genocide was carried out by Cambodian communists between the years of 1975 and 1979. This political group had been slowly increasing its population while simultaneously being armed by groups such as the Viet Cong and the North Vietnamese army. Following the Khmer Rouge's victory in the Cambodian Civil War in 1975, the group began the mass killings that would plague the countries for the next half-decade. Death tolls during the Khmer Rouge genocide are estimated to be between 1.5 and 3 million, with at least half of those numbers being politically motivated executions. Those who were not subjected to politically motivated executions died either from abysmal work conditions or disciplinary torture followed by execution. The Khmer Rouge regime strictly enforced its social engineering policies, most of which focused on the recreation of an agrarian society. This focus brought the mass-eviction of the Cambodian urban population and later the forced marches of the urban population into rural areas in order to work farming (typically rice) institutions. Furthermore, the Khmer Rouge expected production of rice per hectare to triple from 1 ton to 3 tons; this expectation did not account for the immense inefficiency created by placing an urban population in typically rural jobs. The urban population simply did not have the required skill set to achieve the goals of the Khmer Rouge and many were executed as economic saboteurs (labelled as such due to their production rates). Executions were carried out at first with firearms, but following an ammunition shortage, Cambodian teenagers were armed with blunt melee weapons and forced to carry out executions on enemies of the Khmer Rouge. An estimated 20,000 mass graves have been discovered since the fall of the Khmer Rouge in 1979. In 2014, Khmer Rouge leaders Nuon Chea and Khieu Samphan received life sentences for crimes against humanity.

=== The Daoxian Massacre ===
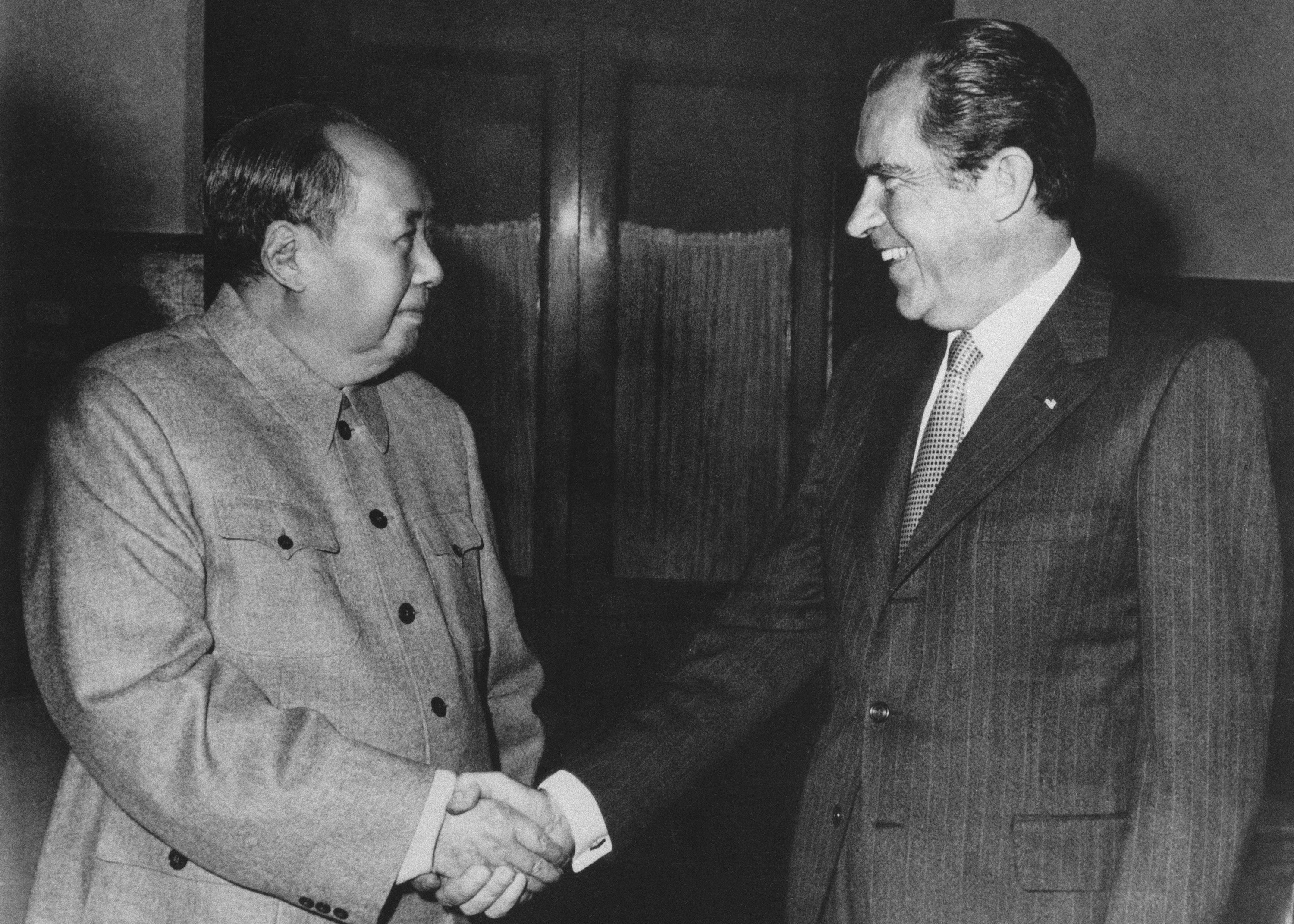
Mao Zedong, leader of the Chinese Communist Party, meeting Richard Nixon, President of the United States

The Daoxian Massacre occurred during China's cultural revolution and lasted for 66 days between the 13th of August and the 17th of October in 1967. Those who were massacred were suspected to be enemies of the Chinese Communist Party (CCP). Typically, local CCP cadres and revolutionary enthusiasts carried out unofficial arrests; those arrested and later executed by aforementioned local CCP cadres or militias received a brief, unjust trial where those judging were the same individuals who had ordered the arrests themselves. Victims were killed in a number of ways, including shooting, beatings, and decapitation. The groups responsible for the killings were rewarded with higher wages and improved living conditions. While the CCP did not officially condone them, it did not take any measures to stop the executions until numerous complaints from those who survived the Daoxian Massacre reached the top level of government. The killings ceased following the deployment of the 47th Field Army force but those who partook in the executions were never punished.

=== Genocidal rape in Bangladesh ===
The 1971 Bangladesh Liberation War saw members of the Pakistani military and their supporting militias rape between 200,000 and 400,000 women and girls in an attempt of ethnic extinguisher. The Pakistani military leaders had declared Bengali freedom fighters as "Hindus" and that their women were simply spoils of war for the military to use as they saw fit. Women were held in special camps where they were repeatedly raped by rotating Pakistani army groups; these women could only escape the camps by hanging themselves with their hair – an action that led to the military shaving the heads of all the camp's inmates. Those who were not subjected to these rape camps would typically be raped, killed, and bayoneted in the genitalia. While the Pakistani military attempted to keep these systematic rapes out of international media, numerous human rights agencies and media outlets published reports or stories regarding this genocidal rape; Pakistan subsequently came under immense international criticism, reprimanding them for their actions. While the Pakistani military argues there were no more than a few hundred cases of rape, which were simply the actions of deviant soldiers, it is much more likely that the military had adopted a policy that could extinguish the Bengali people.

== See also ==
- Andijan Civil Unrest 2005
- Asian Values
- Democracy in Asia
- Human rights in Australia
- Human Rights in Central Asia
- Human Rights in East Asia
