= Human rights in Europe =

Human rights in Europe are generally upheld. However, several human rights infringements exist, ranging from the treatment of asylum seekers to police brutality. The 2012 Amnesty International Annual Report points to problems in several European countries. One of the most accused is Belarus, the only country in Europe that, according to The Economist, has an authoritarian government. All other European countries are considered to have "some form of democratic government", having either the "full democracy", "flawed democracy", or a "hybrid regime".

Unlike its member states, the European Union itself had not yet joined the Convention on Human Rights as of 2011.

== History ==
The history of human rights in Europe is marked by a contradictory combination of legislative and intellectual progress and violations of fundamental human rights in both Europe and its colonies.

=== Pre-1945 ===
- 1215: Magna Carta
- 1222: Golden Bull of 1222 of Hungary defines the first time the rights of the nobility.
- 1264: Statute of Kalisz – the General Charter of Jewish Liberties introduces numerous right for the Jews in Poland, leading to an autonomous "nation within a nation"
- 1367: Statutes of Kilkenny
- 1463: Sultan Mehmed II's firman grants freedom to Bosnian Franciscans after the Ottoman conquest of Bosnia
- 15th to 19th centuries: African slave trade
- 1505: Nihil novi in Poland forbids peasant from leaving their lands without permission from their feudal lord
- 1525: Twelve Articles of Memmingen, Bavaria, Germany
- 1529: Statutes of Lithuania
- 1550–1551: Bartolomé de las Casas debates Juan Ginés de Sepúlveda on human rights (Valladolid debate)
- 1573: The Warsaw Confederation confirms the religious freedom of all residents of Poland
- 1650–1660: Jesuit priest António Vieira fights for the human rights of the indigenous population of Brazil and obtains royal decrees against their enslavement
- 1689: The English Bill of Rights is established
- 1689: The Claim of Right Act 1689 is passed by Scottish Parliament
- 1690: The Second Treatise of Civil Government by John Locke
- 1772: British court ruling by William Murray, 1st Earl of Mansfield sets a precedent that slavery had no basis in law
- 1773: The Inclosure Act 1773 (13 Geo. 3. c. 81) is passed by the Parliament of Great Britain, enclosing common land and assigning private property rights to lands which formerly had not been private
- 1781: Serfdom is abolished in the Habsburg countries through the emperor Leopold II ( Bohemia, Moravia and Austrian Silesia)
- 1783:
  - Serfdom is abolished in the first German state, Baden
  - Poland-Lithuania abolishes corporal punishment
- 1789: The Declaration of the Rights of Man and of the Citizen is introduced in France
- 1790: Rights of Man by Thomas Paine
- 1792: Denmark made transatlantic slave trade illegal but the prohibition would not take effect before 1803 (slavery was still legal).
- 1794:
  - France abolishes slavery
  - The Proclamation of Połaniec, Poland, partially abolishes serfdom and grants substantial civil liberties to peasants
- 1802: France re-introduces slavery
- 1804: The Napoleonic Code forbids privileges based on birth, establishes freedom of religion, and specifies a meritocratic system for government jobs
- 1807: Britain abolishes the slave trade (but not of slavery itself)
- 1810: Prussia abolishes serfdom
- 1832: The British Reform Act 1832 extends voting rights and legalizes trade unions
- 1833: Britain abolishes slavery
- 1845: Another United Kingdom Inclosure Act 1845 (8 & 9 Vict. c. 118) allows for the employment of Inclosure Commissioners, who could enclose land without submitting a request to Parliament. Private property rights over formerly unenclosed lands expand.
- 1848: France abolishes slavery
- 1859: On Liberty by John Stuart Mill
- 1861: Russia abolishes serfdom
- 1863: The Netherlands abolishes slavery
- 1867: Britain's Second Reform Act extends voting rights to all urban male homeowners
- 1884: The British Representation of the People Act 1884 extends male voting rights from the town to the country
- 1906: Finland is the first European country to introduce universal suffrage in national elections
- 1917: Finland extends universal suffrage to local elections
- 1918: Another British Representation of the People Act 1918 grants suffrage to nearly all men, along with property-owning women over age 30
- 1933–1945: The Holocaust

=== 1945–1984 ===
- 1954–1956: Britain tortures and kills at least 50,000 Kenyans in the Mau Mau Rebellion
- 1954–62: Both France and the FLN use torture in the Algerian War of Independence
- 1961: French police massacre pro-FLN Algerians in a peaceful demonstration later known as the Paris massacre
- 1972: British Army shoots unarmed protesters in Northern Ireland, later known as Bloody Sunday
- 1974: Turkey invades and ethnically cleanses 80–87% of the population of Kyrenia, Ammochostos, Rizokarpaso and parts of Nicosia Cyprus. Turkey's use of Napalm on civilians is condemned. Systematic Rape requires the passing of emergency legislation by the British Parliament to allow Medical Officers to perform emergency abortions of raped women. Missing people number about 1,652. Footage of civilians taken to Turkey reveal some people were taken alive but still remain unaccounted for.
- 1978: European Court of Human Rights rules that torture by the British government of suspect IRA members constitutes "cruel and inhuman treatment"

=== 1984–present ===
The states of the EU, as well as Iceland, Norway, Switzerland, and the European microstates, generally have clean human rights records. The prospect of EU membership (which also entails subscription to the European Convention on Human Rights) has encouraged several European states, most notably Croatia and Turkey, to improve their human rights, especially on freedom of speech and banning the death penalty. However, certain laws passed in the wake of the war on terrorism have been condemned for encroaching on human rights. There has been criticism of the French law on secularity and conspicuous religious symbols in schools and the French legislation for protecting the public against certain cults. In the UK, a new British Bill of Rights has been advocated to: protect wider range of economic, political, judicial, communication, and personal rights and freedoms; extend normal rights and freedoms to presently unprivileged business-economic minority classes; strengthen and extend the liberal social order; and establish a new independent Supreme Court with the power to strike down government laws and policies that violate basic rights and freedoms.

==== Latvia ====
In Latvia, citizenship, usage of mother tongue, and ethnic-based discrimination are the most acute problems for its Russian minority. Currently, half of the Russian-speaking community of Latvia are Latvian citizens, while the other half do not have citizenship of any country in the world. They form the unique legal category of "Latvian non-citizens". In some spheres their status is similar to that of citizens of Latvia (for example, in receive consular support abroad), while in some spheres they have fewer rights than foreigners (recent immigrants from EU countries can vote at municipal and EP elections but Latvian non-citizens cannot).

The Russian minority in Latvia is on the decline due to emigration and the negative birth rate. The death rate among Russians in Latvia is higher than that of Latvians in Latvia and Russians in Russia, in part due to the unfavourable social conditions that have come about in Latvian cities following the enforced destruction of the industrial economy in the beginning of the 1990s.

==== Former USSR states ====
Following the collapse and break-up of the Soviet Union, its history of severe human right abuses were laid in the open. The situation has since improved in the majority of formerly communist states of Europe, especially of those in Central Europe. These Central European states have aligned themselves with the EU (most of them becoming members in 2004) and have undergone a rigorous reform of human rights laws, most notably regarding freedom of speech and religion and the protection of minorities, particularly of the Romani. However, the former USSR states have made slower progress. Despite all but Belarus becoming members of the Council of Europe, constant conflict between minority group separatists in the Caucasus has led these states to pass strict laws with the aim of limiting rebellions.

===== Armenia =====
A series of mass protests were held in Armenia in the wake of the Armenian presidential election of 19 February 2008. Mass protests against alleged electoral fraud were held in the capital city of Yerevan and organised by supporters of the unsuccessful presidential candidate and first President of Armenia, Levon Ter-Petrosyan. After nine days of peaceful protests at the Opera Square, the national police and military forces tried to disperse the protesters on 1 March. The protests began on 20 February, lasted for 10 days in Yerevan's Freedom Square, and involved tens of thousands of demonstrators during the day and hundreds camping out overnight. As a result, 10 people were killed. Despite the urges of the government to stop the demonstrations, the protests continued until 1 March. On the morning of 1 March, police and army units dispersed the 700–1,000 persons who remained overnight, beating them with truncheons and electric-shock devices. As of 4 March, many protesters are still missing. Since 1 March, Ter-Petrosyan was placed under de facto house arrest.

===== Belarus =====
Belarus is often described as "Europe's last dictatorship". The press is strictly censored by the government, and freedom of speech and protest have been removed. Although Belarus' post-independence elections match the outward forms of a democracy, election monitors have described them as unsound.

===== Russia =====
Russia has partaken in some questionable acts, such as replacing elected governors with appointed ones and censoring the press, claiming many of these measures are needed to maintain control over its volatile Caucasus border, where several rebel groups are based. The Economist`s Democracy Index classified Russia as a "hybrid regime" in 2007. Since then Russia was downgraded to an authoritarian regime, which the report attributes to concerns over the 4 December legislative election and Vladimir Putin's decision to run again in the 2012 presidential election. 2015 Democracy Index showed the same result.

==== Former Yugoslavian states ====
Following the collapse of communism in Yugoslavia, the state held together by the strong rule of Josip Broz Tito, several of the nations which made it up declared independence. What followed was several years of bloody conflict as the dominant nation, Serbia, attempted at first to hold the state together, and then instead to hold onto Serb-populated areas of neighbouring nations in order to create a "Greater Serbia". Within Serbia itself there was conflict in Kosovo, where Serbs are a minority.

The now six states of the former Yugoslavia, (Bosnia and Herzegovina, Croatia, Macedonia, Montenegro, Serbia, and Slovenia) are in various stages of human rights development. Slovenia, which suffered least in the Yugoslav wars, is a member of EU and is widely considered to have a good human rights record and policy, Croatia joined the EU and is considered to have a good human rights, Republic of Macedonia and Montenegro have formed stable governments and have fair human rights records. However, Bosnia-Herzegovina and Serbia retain questionable rights records, the former entirely governed under UN Mandate, as is a part of the latter (Kosovo). Bosnia-Herzegovina is the most ethnically diverse of the former Yugoslavian states, with large groups of Bosniaks, Croats, and Serbs, making peace difficult to attain. Both Bosnia and Serbia are classified as democracies by The Economist, with the former being a "hybrid regime" and the latter a "flawed democracy".

=== Universal suffrage ===
Universal suffrage was introduced in European countries during the following years:

- 1906: Finland (Note: Finland was the first country in the world to give full parliamentary rights to women. New Zealand had granted women suffrage before Finland, but not the right to stand as candidates in elections.)
- 1913: Norway
- 1915:
  - Denmark
  - Iceland
- 1917:
  - Russia
  - Lithuania
  - Latvia
  - Estonia
- 1918:
  - After the Central Powers' defeat in World War I and collapse of Habsburg Empire:
    - Germany
    - Austria
    - Hungary
    - Poland
    - Czechoslovakia
  - Luxembourg
- 1919:
  - Netherlands
  - Sweden
- 1922: Ireland (after receiving independence)
- 1923: Romania
- 1928: United Kingdom
- 1930: Turkey
- 1931: Portugal (Note: Women lost the right to vote under Salazar; it was reintroduced again in 1975.)
- 1931: Spain (Note: Women lost the vote under Franco in 1936 and did not regain it until 1976.)
- 1944: France
- 1946:
  - Italy
  - Yugoslavia
  - Malta
- 1948: Belgium
- 1952: Greece
- 1960:
  - Cyprus
  - San Marino
  - Monaco
- 1971: Switzerland
- 1975: Portugal
- 1976: Spain
- 1984: Liechtenstein

=== Known issues ===
==== Human trafficking ====
The end of communism, the collapse of the Soviet Union and Yugoslavia, and easier global travel have contributed to an increase in human trafficking, with many victims being forced into prostitution, hard labour, agriculture, and domestic service. The conflicts in the former Yugoslavia have also been a key factor in the increase of human trafficking in Europe. The problem is particularly severe in Belgium, the Netherlands, Germany, Italy and Turkey; these countries, along with Thailand, Japan, Israel and the United States are listed by the UNODC as top destinations for victims of human trafficking.

The Council of Europe Convention on Action against Trafficking in Human Beings was adopted by the Council of Europe on 16 May 2005. The aim of the convention is to prevent and combat the trafficking in human beings. The convention entered into force on 1/2/2008. As of June 2017 it has been ratified by 47 states (including Belarus, a non Council of Europe state), with Russia being the only state not to have ratified (nor signed).

Amnesty International has called on European states to sign and ratify the convention as part of the fight against human trafficking.

== Council of Europe / European Union ==
The Council of Europe is responsible for both the European Convention on Human Rights and the European Court of Human Rights. These institutions bind the council's members to a code of human rights which, though strict, are more lenient than those of the Universal Declaration of Human Rights. The council also promotes the European Charter for Regional or Minority Languages and the European Social Charter.

The Council of Europe is separate from the European Union, but the latter is expected to join the European Convention and potentially the Council itself. The EU also has a separate human rights document: the Charter of Fundamental Rights of the European Union. Since March 2007 the EU has had a Fundamental Rights Agency based in Vienna, Austria.

The Office of the United Nations High Commissioner for Human Rights is responsible for promoting and protecting the human rights defined in international human rights treaties in Europe. In late 2009, the High Commissioner opened a Regional Office for Europe which is mandated to promote and protect human rights in 40 European countries, including member states, candidate states, and potential candidate (the Balkans, Iceland, Norway and Turkey).

== Human rights in the EU member states ==
- Austria
- Belgium
- Bulgaria
- Croatia
- Cyprus
- Czech Republic
- Denmark
- Estonia
- Finland
- France
- Germany
- Greece
- Hungary
- (Republic of Ireland) Ireland
- Italy
- Latvia
- Lithuania
- Luxembourg
- Malta
- Netherlands
- Poland
- Portugal
- Romania
- Slovakia
- Slovenia
- Spain
- Sweden

== See also ==
- Capital punishment in Europe
- Charter of Fundamental Rights of the European Union
- European Convention on Human Rights
- European Court of Human Rights
- Council of Europe
- Democracy in Europe
- Environmental racism in Europe
- Human rights in Asia
- Human rights in East Asia
- Human rights in the Soviet Union
- Human rights in the United States
