= Human trafficking in Austria =

Human trafficking in Austria involves the exploitation of women, men, and children for forced prostitution and forced labor, with Austria functioning both as a destination and as a transit country. Exploitation is alleged to occur in multiple sectors, including agriculture, construction, restaurants, and tourism. Victims originate primarily from Eastern Europe, Africa, and Asia.

In 2009, household spending on domestic workers was estimated at US$4.3 billion, with exploitation in this sector described as a persistent problem. Cases of domestic servitude have also been linked to diplomats, particularly from the Middle East, who benefit from diplomatic immunity. Forced begging involving Roma children and other minors from Eastern Europe was reported in 2010. Non-governmental organizations (NGOs) working with victims, especially from Nigeria, have noted that traffickers sometimes use Austria’s legal prostitution and asylum systems to maintain control over victims.

The U.S. Department of State’s Office to Monitor and Combat Trafficking in Persons assessed Austria in 2010, and concluded that the country met the minimum standards for eliminating trafficking as defined in the Trafficking Victims Protection Act. This assessment was reaffirmed in 2017. The 2010 report noted an increase in the number of victims identified and referred for assistance, along with changes to domestic worker regulations intended to reduce involuntary servitude. However, it also observed shortcomings, including limited penalties for convicted traffickers, the absence of systematic victim identification procedures, and instances where child victims were penalized for unlawful acts committed under coercion.

A 2020–2024 report by the Council of Europe’s Group of Experts on Action against Trafficking in Human Beings (GRETA) indicated that the annual number of identified trafficking victims has remained stable at about 120, with an increase in male victims during this period.

== Prosecution ==
The Austrian government prosecutes and convicts trafficking offenders, though many sentences are short. Over half of convicted traffickers receive jail terms of 12 months or less, and approximately one-third were not jailed.

Article 104(a) of the Austrian Criminal Code prohibits trafficking for sexual exploitation and forced labour. Prosecutors also use Article 217, which prohibits cross-border trafficking for the purpose of prostitution, and Article 114 of the Aliens Police Act, which addresses alien smuggling. Penalties under Articles 104(a) and 114 can reach up to 10 years of imprisonment, while penalties under Article 217 range from six months to 10 years. These penalties are comparable in severity to those for other serious crimes, such as rape.

In 2008, the government reported the prosecution and conviction of one offender in which trafficking was the leading charge, while a total of 18 trafficking offenders were convicted that year, marking a decrease from 30 convictions in 2007. Sentences varied from jail terms to fines. NGOs noted that even in some cases with multiple witness testimonies, the trials did not result in conviction, and that prosecutors and judges sometimes lacked specialized anti-trafficking training.

== Protection ==
In one report issued in 2009, NGOs said that police in Vienna proactively refer trafficking victims for care and collaborate to improve their ability to spot indicators of sex trafficking, but referral is not systematic. NGOs reported in that same report that police effectively partnered with them on cases to ensure trafficking victims adequate recovery time to become more effective witnesses. Vienna, as of 2009, continued to fund the country's only specialized anti-trafficking NGO, which provided open shelter and assistance to female victims. This shelter was at its full capacity of 18 beds throughout 2009. The Austrian government provided $828,000 to this NGO in 2009, compared with $542,700 in 2008. It provided counseling and other services to 182 trafficking victims in 2009; police referred approximately 90 of these victims, compared with 60 referrals from the previous year. Fifty-nine victims received shelter from the government-funded NGO; all victims received assistance in the form of social and legal counseling in their native language, German-language classes, computer courses, and healthcare.

The government provided foreign victims of trafficking with legal alternatives to their removal, and in April 2009 passed the Residence and Settlement Act, which listed victims of trafficking as a special category with a right for temporary resident status. The government encouraged victims to assist with investigations and prosecutions of traffickers and an NGO reported a high rate of victims who willingly cooperated on their cases. Furthermore, police provided information on potential female victims of forced prostitution to NGOs when these victims appeared reluctant to disclose elements of their exploitation to law enforcement. According to one NGO, the only systematic regulation by the government within Austria's sizable, legal commercial sex sector consisted of weekly health checks for sexually transmitted diseases and periodic police checks of registration cards. In 2009, the government began training labor inspectors to increase identification of forced labor trafficking.

The city of Vienna's specialist center for unaccompanied minors accommodated 121 children in 2009, some of whom were reported to be victims of trafficking. This center reportedly facilitated the repatriation of children subjected to forced prostitution and forced begging during the reporting period. However, according to local observers, as of 2009, this center has limited capacity to accommodate trafficked children, does not function as an anti-trafficking NGO, and there was little official follow-up or assurances made to ensure a safe return or protection from re-trafficking. Furthermore, the center only accommodated children who had been apprehended by the police, and is an open facility, allowing traffickers continued access to their victims.

Also in 2009, according to local experts, authorities – especially outside Vienna – do not identify many child trafficking victims and there are no specialized services or targeted outreach efforts to identify potential children who are trafficked throughout Austria. The government reportedly ensured identified victims were not punished for unlawful acts committed as a direct result of being trafficked; however, during the year at least some child sex trafficking victims were penalized for unlawfully engaging in prostitution.

== Prevention ==
As of 2009, Austria was taking proactive efforts to prevent trafficking by conducting public awareness activities. It subsidized television programs about trafficking and hosted international conferences aimed at raising awareness about human trafficking. It also funded campaigns to educate people about the possible presence of trafficked women in the prostitution sector and to inform female prostitutes about their rights under national law by distributing brochures and continued to maintain an active presence in well known red light districts.

Likewise, also in 2009, the Interior Ministry produced and distributed literature aimed at increasing law enforcement's awareness about human trafficking and improve victim identification processes. The brochure listed contact numbers of anti-trafficking NGOs and government offices responsible for victim protection. The government also subsidized the production and distribution of leaflets containing information that offers support to victims. According to ECPAT Austria, approximately 4,500 Austrians contribute to the global demand for child sex tourism. Austrian law provided extraterritorial jurisdiction over Austrian nationals who travel abroad to engage in child commercial sexual exploitation.

The above initiatives were, in 2009, aligned with a strategy that involved the "coordination of all activities concerned at the regional, national and international level by raising awareness, the protection of victims by establishing victims' rights," and "the prosecution of offenders of THB."

Austria is a signatory to a number of international conventions addressing human trafficking, such as the United Nations Convention Against Transnational Organized Crime (2000) and its Protocol to Prevent, Suppress, and Punish Trafficking in Persons, Especially Women and Children; the Council of Europe Convention on Action against Trafficking in Human Beings (2005); the UN Convention on the Rights of the Child (1989) and the Optional Protocol on the Sale of Children, Child Prostitution and Child Pornography (2000); and the UN Convention on the Elimination of All Forms of Discrimination against Women.

In 2004, the Austrian government created the Task Force on Combating Human Trafficking under the direction of the Foreign Ministry and was tasked to elaborate and monitor the implementation of the National Action Plans on Combating Human Trafficking. This national plan underwent a series of changes in 2009 and 2012.

Observers have argued that Austria should adopt specific measures to enforce compliance to the principle of non-punishment of human trafficking victims, arguing that the criminalization of victims of trafficking discourages victims from coming forward and cooperating with authorities. According to the Asylum Act 2005, a "Residence Permit for Individual Protection" is to be granted to third-country nationals resident in the territory of Austria ex officio or upon a substantiated application where it is necessary to ensure the prosecution of judicially punishable acts, or to assert and enforce civil law claims in connection with such punishable acts. When it comes to renewing such a permit, the Federal Office for Immigration and Asylum must check if the conditions continue to apply. In this case, the Red-White-Red Card Plus residence permit is to be granted within the framework of the renewal procedure, as attempt to address the security issues for those cooperating with authorities. However, this permit has been criticized for extremely demanding conditions that do not take into account the extent of trauma and psychological strain trafficked individuals are under, coupled with the fact that for many of them it might be impossible to fulfil the requirements of assimilation, such as learning a language, in the given timeframe of 12 months.

== See also ==
- Human rights in Austria
