= ASEAN Intergovernmental Commission on Human Rights =

The ASEAN Intergovernmental Commission on Human Rights (AICHR) is an ASEAN organ inaugurated in October 2009 as an overarching human rights body of the Association of Southeast Asian Nations (ASEAN). The commission was created to promote and protect human rights, and regional co-operation on human rights in the member states of (Brunei Darussalam, Cambodia, Indonesia, Laos, Malaysia, Myanmar, Philippines, Singapore, Thailand, Timor-Leste and Vietnam). The AICHR meets at least twice per year.

Human rights are referenced in the ASEAN Charter (Articles 1.7, 2.2.i and 14) and other key ASEAN documents. The commission operates through consultation and consensus—each of the 10 member states has veto power. The commission makes no provision for independent observers.

The AICHR is directed by a body of representatives, one per member state, each nominated by and answerable to their government and serving a three-year term, renewable once. The commission has 14 mandates, mainly around the promotion and protection of human rights, capacity building, advice and technical assistance, information gathering and engagement with national, regional, and international bodies. One of its mandates was "to develop an ASEAN Human Rights Declaration", but when this was adopted, in November 2012, it came under criticism from human rights groups for including wording that suggested that access to human rights was contingent on "the performance of corresponding duties as every person has responsibilities to all other individuals, the community and the society where one lives". NGOs in the region presented cases of alleged violations to it at its inaugural meeting in Jakarta.

The commission has been described as "toothless" by observers including The Wall Street Journal. The ASEAN chair at the time of AICHR's founding, Abhisit Vejjajiva, said that "...the commission's 'teeth' would be strengthened down the road", but six years after AICHR's founding, critics charge that "...since it was launched,...[AICHR] has yet to take any action to safeguard the most basic freedoms of citizens it supposedly represents."

== AICHR Commissioners ==
=== 2009-2012 ===
Name	Country
Ahmad Jumat	Brunei
Om Yenting	Cambodia
Rafendi Djamin	Indonesia
Bounkuet Sangsomsak	Laos
Muhammad Shafee Abdullah	Malaysia
Kyaw Tint Swe	Myanmar
Rosario G. Manalo	Philippines
Richard Magnus	Singapore
Sriprapha Petcharamesree	Thailand
Nguyen Duy Hung	Vietnam

=== 2013-2015 ===
Name	Country
Pehin Dato Awang Ahmad Jumat	Brunei
Srun Thirith	Cambodia
Rafendi Djamin	Indonesia
Phoukhong Sisoulath	Laos
Muhammad Shafee Abdullah	Malaysia
Kyaw Tint Swe	Myanmar
Rosario G. Manalo	Philippines
Chan Heng Chee	Singapore
Seree Nonthasoot	Thailand
Le Thi Thu	Vietnam

=== 2016-2018 ===
Name	Country
Mohammad Rosli Ibrahim	Brunei
Polyne Hean	Cambodia
Dinna Wisnu	Indonesia
Phoukhong Sisoulath	Laos
Edmund Bon Tai Soon	Malaysia
Hla Myint	Myanmar
Leo Herrera-Lim	Philippines
Barry Desker	Singapore
Seree Nonthasoot	Thailand
Nguyen Thi Nha	Vietnam

=== 2019-2021 ===
Name	Country
Nor Hashimah Taib	Brunei
Polyne Hean	Cambodia
Yuyun Wahyuningrum	Indonesia
Malayvieng Sakonhninhom	Laos
Eric Paulsen	Malaysia
Maung Wai	Myanmar
Jaime Victor B. Ledda	Philippines
Shashi Jayakumar	Singapore
Amara Pongsapich	Thailand
Nguyen Thai Yen Huong	Vietnam

=== 2022-2024 ===
Name	Country
Nor Hashimah Taib	Brunei
Keo Remy	Cambodia
Yuyun Wahyuningrum	Indonesia
Yong Chanthalangsy	Laos
Edmund Bon Tai Soon	Malaysia
Nyunt Swe	Myanmar
Angelito A. Nayan	Philippines
Shashi Jayakumar	Singapore
Amara Pongsapich	Thailand
Nguyen Thai Yen Huong	Vietnam

=== 2025-2027 ===
Name	Country
Ajman Meludin	Brunei
Keo Remy	Cambodia
Anita Wahid	Indonesia
Yong Chanthalangsy	Laos
Edmund Bon Tai Soon	Malaysia
Nyunt Swe	Myanmar
Severo Catura	Philippines
Eugene Tan Kheng Boon	Singapore
Bhanubhatra Jittiang	Thailand
Nguyen Trung Thanh	Vietnam

== See also ==
- ASEAN Commission on the Promotion and Protection of the Rights of Women
