= Rosario Manalo =

Political scientist

- Born: October 2, 1935 (age 91); Manila, Philippines
- Education: University of the Philippines (AB and MA); Long Island University (MA); Philippine Women's University (PhD)
- Occupation: Dean
- Employer(s): Philippine Women's University HZB School of International Relations and Diplomacy
- Spouse: Armando Manalo (died 2008)
- Children: Enrique Manalo

Rosario Manalo (née González) (born October 2, 1935), is a Filipino career diplomat, political scientist, and educator in the Philippines. She is the Special Representative of the Philippines to the ASEAN Intergovernmental Commission on Human Rights and has served as undersecretary of Foreign Affairs in charge of International Economic Relations from 1997 to 2001. Moreover, she has served as Philippine ambassador to Sweden (with concurrent accreditation in Norway, Finland, Estonia, Latvia and Lithuania), to France (with concurrent accreditation in Portugal), to Belgium (with concurrent accreditation in Luxembourg) and to the European Economic Community.

Manalo was re-elected to serve on the United Nations Committee on the Elimination of Discrimination Against Women (CEDAW) for another term covering the period 2021-2024 during elections at the UN General Assembly Hall in 2020.

== Early life and education ==
Manalo was born on October 2, 1935, in Manila, Philippines.

Manalo earned Bachelor of Science in Foreign Service and Bachelor of Science in Jurisprudence degrees, a Bachelor of Laws degree and a Master of Arts in Public Administration from the University of the Philippines Diliman and a Master of Arts in International Studies and Diplomacy from Long Island University in New York. She was the first woman to pass the Philippine Foreign Service Officers’ Examinations (FSO) in 1959.

== Diplomatic career ==
Manalo was based in Manila for eighteen years before getting her first foreign assignment. She was the Philippine Permanent Delegate to the UNESCO from 1990 to 1994, and the European Economic Community from 1979 to 1987. She was Chairwoman of the United Nations Commission on the Status of Women from 1983 to 1988. In 1976, she was named Deputy Secretary General of the ASEAN National Secretariat, and a Senior Official of the Asia Pacific Economic Cooperation in 1996.

She was Undersecretary of Foreign Affairs in charge of International Economic Relations from 1997 to 2001. She served as Philippine Ambassador to Sweden (with concurrent accreditation in Norway, Finland, Estonia, Latvia and Lithuania), to France (with concurrent accreditation in Portugal and Monaco), to Belgium (with concurrent accreditation in Luxembourg.

Manalo is the Philippine representative and one of only twelve elected experts to the New York-based United Nations Committee monitoring the implementation of the Convention on the Elimination of All Forms of Discrimination Against Women or CEDAW from 1992 to 2002. Manalo was re-elected to serve on the United Nations Committee on the Elimination of Discrimination Against Women for another term covering the period 2021-2024 during elections at the UN General Assembly Hall in 2020.

Manalo chaired the High-Level Task Force which drafted the new ASEAN charter that carried the Philippine-initiative creating a human rights body.

At present, Manalo is the Special Representative of the Philippines to the ASEAN Intergovernmental Commission on Human Rights.

== Academic work ==
Manalo is the Dean of the HZB School of International Relations and Diplomacy in the Philippine Women's University. She is a lecturer in the European Studies Program in the Ateneo de Manila University. and in the Consular and Diplomatic Affairs Program of the School of Diplomacy and Governance at De La Salle-College of Saint Benilde (DLS-CSB), a district school of De La Salle Philippines. She was also a lecturer in Miriam College and the University of Asia and the Pacific on Philippine Foreign Policy for the Master of Arts in Political Economy program, as well as Comparative European Political Economy. Moreover, she chairs the UNESCO National Commission of the Philippines, the educational and cultural advocacy group of the United Nations.

== Socio-civic work ==
Manalo held leadership positions in various national and international civic and professional groups, such as—the National Commission on the Role of Filipino Women from 1975 to 1986, Federación Internacional de Abogadas, the Women's Lawyers’ Circle of the Philippines, and ZONTA Philippines.

== Personal life ==
She was married to writer and fellow diplomat, Armando Manalo (d. 2008). Her son, Enrique Manalo, who also served as a diplomat, is the former ambassador of the Philippines to the United Kingdom (2011 – 2016) and Permanent Representative of the Philippines to the United Nations (2020 – 2022), and the current Secretary of Foreign Affairs under the Marcos Jr. administration since July 1, 2022.
