= Human rights in Slovakia =

Human rights in Slovakia are governed by the laws of Slovakia and overseen by international organizations such as the Council of Europe.

== Legal basis ==
Chapter two of the Constitution of Slovakia outlines the rights and freedoms guaranteed by law. These include the rights to life, privacy, due process, dignity, property, religion, free movement, free speech, free press, petition, association, and voting, as well as freedoms from torture, cruel punishment, and slavery. The constitution also guarantees that rights can not be protected in a discriminatory manner.

== Political freedom ==
The Office of the Public Defender of Rights and the Slovak National Center for Human Rights are responsible for protecting rights in Slovakia. Elections in Slovakia have been found to be free and fair by the Organization for Security and Co-operation in Europe. The law provides for government action to be made transparent, and government contracts are disclosed to the public. Corruption by government officials is a criminal offense under Slovak law, and isolated cases of corruption in the government have been identified. The government of Slovakia has implemented measures to combat corruption. Anti-corruption raids have been conducted by the police, and dozens of state officials have been charged with corruption and related crimes between 2020 and 2021. Women and LGBT groups are underrepresented in politics.

The Democracy Index rated Slovakia as a "Flawed Democracy" in 2021 with a score of 7.03 out of 10, placing it 45th out of 167 countries. Freedom House rated Slovakia as "Free" in 2022 with a score of 90 out of 100.

== Human trafficking ==
As of 2021, the United States Department of State classifies Slovakia's human trafficking prevention as "Tier 2", meaning that it "does not fully meet the minimum standards for the elimination of trafficking but is making significant efforts to do so". Human trafficking is criminalized by Section 179 of the criminal code, with penalties ranging from four to ten years in prison. In 2021, Slovakia initiated 15 investigations into sex trafficking, four for forced labor, and three for forced begging. The government of Slovakia also funds a non-governmental organization to assist victims of human trafficking.

== Civil rights ==
=== Due process ===
Arbitrary detention, arbitrary deprivation of life, and torture are illegal and not practiced in Slovakia. Laws regarding inhuman or degrading punishment are generally respected, though occasional reports of police abuse exist. Defendants are guaranteed the right to a fair trial, an independent judiciary, the presumption of innocence, and legal counsel. Trust in an independent judiciary has been undermined in Slovakia by accusations of corruption and inefficiency. According to the European Union, only 28% of Slovak citizens had confidence in the judiciary as of 2021.

=== Expression ===
Freedom of expression and freedom of the press are guaranteed under the law of Slovakia. Libel laws are treated as criminal offenses and have been used to restrict reporting by the media and suppress criticism of politicians and other notable figures. Hate speech and Holocaust denial are criminal offenses. The 2018 murder of Ján Kuciak in response to his investigations into corruption represented a major attack on the freedom of the press in Slovakia.

== Discrimination ==
=== LGBT ===
Discrimination on the basis of sexual orientation and gender identity is illegal, but this law is not consistently enforced. Political representation of LGBT people in Slovakia is limited. Politicians rarely identify as LGBT and public comments disparaging the LGBT community are common. The government requires individuals seeking legal gender recognition to be sterilized.

=== Race and ethnicity ===
The constitution guarantees equality on the basis of race, nationality, ethnicity, and any other status. Hate crimes are penalized more strictly in Slovakia. Anti-discrimination laws are enforced inconsistently, and the Romani people in particular experience discrimination, harassment, and police brutality. The Romani people are often segregated from other groups in Slovakia, and crimes against the Romani are not sufficiently investigated. The government of Slovakia has acknowledged its role in the forced sterilizations of thousands of Romani women.

=== Religion ===
The constitution states that there is no official religion of Slovakia and that equality is guaranteed on the basis of religion. Government recognition of religious groups grants special privileges such as ministering in prisons, performing wedding ceremonies, and receiving subsidies. To be granted recognition, religious groups are required to submit the signatures of 50,000 adherents. Students are required to attend religious instruction in school, though alternatives are available. Materials advocating discrimination or hatred against a religious group are illegal and punishable by up to eight years in prison. Despite this, antisemitism and Islamophobia are prevalent in Slovakia, and both are common in the political campaigns of extremist parties.

=== Women ===
The constitution guarantees equality on the basis of sex. Women are granted full political freedoms in Slovakia, and in 2019 the country elected its first woman president. Women are underrepresented in parliament, making up about 21% of the parliament in 2020. Domestic violence in Slovakia is widespread, and outreach for victims of domestic violence is low. Slovakia signed the Istanbul Convention on violence against women but had not ratified it as of 2021.

== See also ==
- Human rights in Europe
- Law of Slovakia
- Politics of Slovakia
- Women in Europe
