= Human rights in East Asia =

The situation of human rights in East Asia varies between the region's countries, which differ in history and political orientation, as well as between contexts within each country. Issues such as refugees fleeing East Timor, the Cambodian killing fields and freedom of speech in Singapore are just a few of the well-known human rights conflicts that have arisen in East Asian countries. The subject of human rights in East Asia is still highly topical at the present time.

== History ==
Pre 1948

To completely understand Eastern Asia's early history, in relation to human rights, it is important to establish context. Academic experts have argued that it could be said Asia has no early history of ‘human rights’, as the term was created by western civilization. When western civilization's approach issues surrounding human rights, these rights are applicable to all individuals within all groups of people in society, and equal treatment is considered fundamental, regardless of socioeconomic status or relationship with the state. It is fair to say that most western people consider themselves entitled to human rights, while in Eastern Asian countries, there is no such expectation of these entitlements. The significant difference appears to stem from Eastern Asian countries focusing more on a person's basic duties than basic rights. The basic duties of an individual tend to rise from that persons socio-economic status.

1948 – present

The Universal Declaration of Human Rights (UDHR) was implemented on 10 December 1948 by the United Nations. Therefore, we have officially witnessed 68 years of the United Nations approaching human rights issues on a global scale. The declaration was created after the end of World War II and was the first worldwide acknowledgement of the rights each individual human being is entitled to. When the UDHR was first created the United Nations was only made up of 51 member states, but after the surge of decolonisation's, beginning in the late 1940s, the UN is now made up of 193 nations. Since 1948, many Eastern Asian countries who were formally colonised have since achieved independence and have joined the UN, therefore acknowledging the UDHR and other major human rights treaties. There is currently no human rights body governing the Eastern Asian region, however the Association of Southeast Asian Nations (ASEAN) issued the ASEAN Human Rights Declaration in 2012.

ASEAN Human Rights Declaration

The first five articles of ASEAN Human Rights Declaration refer specifically to rights of individual people, and especially support the idea of human rights being an expectation to "women, children, the elderly, persons with disabilities, migrant workers, and vulnerable and marginalised groups". It is also noteworthy that Article 10 the declaration directly affirms the UN's Universal Declaration of Human Rights. However, although this initially appeared to be a positive move by the ASEAN, the commission has recently come under criticism from international human rights groups due to a lack of action from the ASEAN governments when it comes to enacting the declaration. It has even been suggested the declaration was made with no genuine intentions behind it for true endorsement.

Asian Human Rights Commission

The Asian Human Rights Commission (AHRC) was founded in 1984 and continues to be an active, outspoken group who intend to promote human rights throughout Asia. The group is particularly interesting as it is completely independent from any state, and acts with the sole intention of promoting awareness on topical human rights issues within Asia. AHRC have stated "Many Asian states have guarantees of human rights in their constitutions, and many of them have ratified international instruments on human rights. However, there continues to be a wide gap between rights enshrined in these documents and the abject reality that denies people their rights. Asian states must take urgent action to implement the human rights of their citizens and residents."

== Human-rights controversy in East Asia ==
Differences to Western Civilization

When looking at the different approaches western and eastern civilizations take to human rights, a former senior minister of Singapore, Lee Kuan Yew said this: "The Confucianist view of order between subject and ruler helps in the rapid transformation of society ... in other words, you fit yourself into society – the exact opposite of the American rights of the individual. I believe that what a country needs to develop is discipline more than democracy. Democracy leads to undisciplined and disorderly conditions." Generally speaking, western people are more suspicious of their powerful government officials. Selfless, uncorrupted government officials are considered a rarity rather than norm and theories of people in power being involved in bribery or fraud are all too often proven true. Western civilization has a political history based around the people overcoming struggles to take their freedom, which is considered by most to be an innate right of human beings. Eastern Civilization's tend to take a different approach to their relationship with the state, with the people holding their state officials in a higher esteem. Leaders in East Asian countries are generally believed to be honourable and of superior intellect to the majority of the population. Historically speaking, even some of the most autocratic leaders of Eastern countries have been voted back into office by their own people. This holds true with the concept that western people are more concerned with their own rights, whilst eastern civilization focuses more on their duties to the state. Individuals in Eastern Asian countries may complain about their leaders in private, but mass protests are uncommon and the sense of trust is their governments usually remains intact. It could be said that East Asia promotes the concept that individual independences may need to be sacrificed in order for the country to maintain a state of prosperity and order. Advocacy groups, international establishments, and Western governments tended to emphasize civil and political rights, such as freedoms of speech, assembly, and the press, exactly the types of rights most likely to create political hostilities. Demands for human rights protections were often made simultaneously with demands for democratization. Asian governments pushed back by emphasising the united economic, social, and cultural rights such as entitlements to education, health, and decent standards of living.

Human Trafficking

Human trafficking is unfortunately on the increase in Asian countries. Women and children appear to be the most vulnerable to become the victims of this black market trade. They are generally trafficked with the intention of being used for commercial sex, domestic work, and construction work. Children are also in demand for factory or farm work or in the entertainment sector. Trafficking amounts to a severe breach of human rights, victims are obviously forced into situations unwillingly, suffer physical and mental abuse and social stigmatization. Traffickers target families who are socioeconomically poor. Human trafficking in the area of Eastern Asia is a very serious problem, especially in Southeast Asia, and one of the region's biggest human rights issues. Human trafficking is not just a problem in the Asian region, it appears to grow as a black market sector in areas that suffer from poverty, yet are also affected by globalisation, meaning many areas of the world are being affected by a rise in the trade. A mix of disadvantaged individuals placed underprivileged situations and manipulative people in a position of wealth and power create an environment for trafficking to develop. Many eastern nationals have attempted to take measures to end trafficking within their country by increasing security measures and imposing harsher penalties on traffickers, but so far attempts have been largely unsuccessful.

Women's Human Rights in Asia

Introduced over twenty years ago, the Convention on the Elimination of All Forms of Discrimination against Women of the United Nations (Women's Convention) is the first and most extensive international treaty addressing the human rights of women. The implementation of the Women's Convention by the UN General Assembly in 1979 signifies a crucial breakthrough in the international acknowledgement of the cause of women's rights. Many Asian nations, developed or third world, have consistently breached women's rights. These include, "trafficking of prostitutes, bride burning, crimes against women and exposure to sexually transmitted diseases." Some states that have acknowledged and ratified the convention are still failing to conduct themselves in accordance with the regulations, often due to Cultural relativism. Women's groups in Eastern Asia appear to be facing an unfavorable struggle in their battle against the discrimination, mainly due to lack of public awareness that the Women's Convention is applicable in their home country. Many Asian women are not aware of the possible protection they could seek under international human rights law. This also relates to many other gender identity human rights issues faced by individuals in Asian countries. While it does appear that progress is being made, many Eastern Asian countries still are falling short of what is required by the 1979 Women's Convention.

See the following for more details on each country:

- China
  - Hong Kong SAR
  - Macau SAR
- Japan
- Mongolia
- North Korea
- South Korea
- Taiwan

== See also ==
- Human rights in Europe
- Human rights in Russia
- Human rights in Australia
- Human rights in the United States
- Human rights in Central Asia
