= ASEAN Commission on the Promotion and Protection of the Rights of Women =

The ASEAN Commission on the Promotion and Protection of the Rights of Women and Children (ACWC) is a part of the Association of Southeast Asian Nations (ASEAN) and was created in 2010 in order to develop policies and programs to benefit women and children in countries that make up ASEAN.

== About ==
The ASEAN Commission on the Promotion and Protection of the Rights of Women and Children (ACWC) was established on April 7, 2010, in Ha Noi, Viet Nam. Calls for the creation of ACWC had started as early as 2004 and the scope was decided by 2009. ACWC was established "to promote and protect the rights of women and children to ensure their equitable development in the region." ACWC as an organization is able to monitor other Association of Southeast Asian Nations (ASEAN) objectives as they relate to women and children.

Each country that is part of ASEAN sends two representatives to ACWC. Representatives serve for three years and can only serve two terms. There are currently twenty representatives who meet twice a year. The first representatives met in February 2011 in Jakarta. The first chairs were Kanda Vajrabhaya and Ahmad Taufan Damanik. ACWC sends an annual report to the ASEAN Ministers Meeting on Social Welfare Development and a copy to the ASEAN Committee on Women (ACW).

ACWC has drafted declarations against violence done to women and children, first presented in 2013. The declaration, called the ACWC Declaration on the Elimination of Violence Against Women and the Elimination of Violence Against Children, has been used to expand on provisions set out by the United Nations Security Council (UNSC) through the Women, Peace and Security (WPS) agenda. ACWC also presents workshops and other types of training to member states. Other areas of interest to ACWC include education, ending human trafficking and mitigating the effects of climate change and war on both women and children.

== Notable representatives ==
- Aline Wong, representative from Singapore in 2010.

== See also ==
- Association of Southeast Asian Nations
- ASEAN Charter
- ASEAN Intergovernmental Commission on Human Rights
