= Human rights in Austria =

Human rights in Austria are generally respected by the government; however, there were problems in some areas. There were some reports of police abuse and use of unjustified force against prisoners. Antisemitic incidents, including physical attacks, name-calling, property damage, and threatening letters, telephone calls, and Internet postings occurred during the year. There was some governmental and societal discrimination against fathers, Muslims and members of unrecognized religious groups, particularly those considered "sects". There were incidents of neo-Nazi activity, rightwing extremism, and xenophobia. Trafficking in women and children for prostitution and labor also remained a problem.

The Austrian litigation association of NGOs against discrimination (de:Klagsverband) is an umbrella body with (at March 2024) 69 members. It offers member organisations legal advice and support in cases of discrimination based on gender, ethnicity or origin, sexual orientation, disability, age, religion and belief.

== Respect for the integrity of the person ==
=== Freedom from arbitrary or unlawful deprivation of life ===
There were no known instances of arbitrary or unlawful killings carried out by the government or its representatives.

In August 2006, a court in Vienna convicted four officers from the Wiener Einsatzgruppe Alarmabteilung, an elite police unit, for abusing and severely injuring Gambian asylum seeker Bakary J. earlier that year during a deportation procedure. The sentences included eight months of suspended imprisonment for three officers, and six months suspended for a fourth. The Austrian branch of Amnesty International condemned the judgments as overly lenient.

Also in August, legal representation for a Nigerian asylum seeker reported that Austrian law enforcement officers had inflicted physical harm on their client during a deportation attempt. The incident allegedly took place in Frankfurt, Germany, after the individual declined to board a flight to Nigeria.

=== Disappearances ===
There were no reports of politically motivated disappearances.

=== Freedom from torture and other cruel, inhuman, or degrading treatment or punishment ===
The law prohibits such practices; however, there were reports that police beat and abused persons.

In 2005 the Council of Europe's Committee for the Prevention of Torture (CPT) reported a "considerable number" of allegations of police mistreatment of criminal detainees. The interior ministry investigated these cases but concluded that none of the accusations could be verified.

During the year the government continued to deny an extradition request from Kosovo authorities in the case of a police officer convicted in his absence for torture while serving in Kosovo's civilian international police in 2003. The government recalled the officer from Kosovo, but allowed him to remain on duty during the investigation. Following the investigation, the officer was removed from his former job in the Ministry of the Interior and demoted to a lower position. In October, the government officially closed the case.

There were no reports during the year that army officials mistreated conscripts. However, in August 2017 a conscript died during a march. After this event some former conscripts unveiled that they had been exposed to intimidation and humiliation during their service time.

=== Prison and detention Center conditions ===
Prison conditions generally met international standards in many areas, and the government permitted visits by independent human rights observers. A May report by the Human Rights Advisory Council explicitly criticized pre-deportation conditions in 2005 as "questionable from a human rights point of view," and, at times "not in conformity with human rights standards."

Some human rights observers criticized the incarceration of nonviolent offenders, such as persons awaiting deportation, for long periods in single cells or inadequate facilities designed for temporary detention. In 2005 the CPT noted that juveniles were not always separated from adults at the Linz prison.

=== Freedom from arbitrary arrest or detention ===
The law prohibits arbitrary arrest and detention, and the government generally observed these prohibitions; however, the strict application of slander laws tended to discourage reports of police abuse.

The country has a police force that is responsible for maintaining internal security. The Ministry of Interior controls the police, while the Ministry of Defense controls the army, which is responsible for external security. The police were generally well trained and disciplined. On August 31, a senior Vienna police officer, Ernst Geiger, received a three-month suspended sentence for violation of confidentiality rules. Geiger had allegedly informed the owner of a sauna of an upcoming police raid on March 9. Vienna's top police official, Roland Horngacher, was suspended from office on August 9 and faces charges of accepting improper gifts and abuse of office for suspected leaking of information to journalists. Government statistics for 2005 showed there were 1,047 public complaints against federal police officials; of those, 960 were dropped. In 18 court cases, two officers were convicted of using unjustified force and two cases were pending at the end of the year. Some police violence appeared to be racially motivated. Nongovernmental organizations (NGOs) and other groups continued to criticize the police for targeting minorities. During the year the interior ministry conducted racial sensitivity training programs for over 2,000 police and other officials with NGO assistance. The Human Rights Advisory Council monitors police respect for human rights and makes recommendations to the minister of the interior. During the year the council issued several recommendations to improve processing of pre-deportation and juvenile delinquent cases.

In criminal cases the law provides for investigative or pretrial detention for up to 48 hours; an investigative judge may decide within that period to grant a prosecution request for detention of up to two years pending completion of an investigation. The law specifies grounds required for such investigative detention and conditions for bail. The investigative judge is required to evaluate such detention periodically. There is a system of bail. The police and judicial authorities respected these laws in practice. Detainees also had prompt access to a lawyer; however, the CPT noted in 2004 that criminal suspects who lack the means to pay for legal services may be appointed an ex officio lawyer only after the court's decision to detain them, i.e. 96 hours after their apprehension.

=== Availability of fair public trials ===
The law provides for an independent judiciary, and the government generally respected this provision in practice.

The court system consists of local, regional, and higher regional courts, as well as the Supreme Court. The Supreme Court is the highest judicial body, while the Administrative Court acts as the supervisory body over administrative acts of the executive branch. The Constitutional Court presides over constitutional issues.

The law provides for the right to a fair trial, and an independent judiciary generally enforced this right. A system of judicial review provides extensive possibilities for appeal. Trials must be public and conducted orally. Persons charged with criminal offenses are considered innocent until proven guilty. Defendants have the right to be present during trials. While pro bono attorneys are supposed to be provided to indigent defendants, the CPT in its 2004 report found that there were generally not enough lawyers in criminal matters, financial arrangements were inadequate, and lawyers were not available around the clock. The report concluded that, as there is no effective system of free legal aid for indigent persons in police custody, any right of access to a lawyer at that stage remains, in most cases, purely theoretical.

There were no reports of political prisoners or detainees.

There is an independent and impartial judiciary in civil matters, including an appellate system. This is available for lawsuits seeking damages for human rights violations.

=== Freedom from arbitrary interference with privacy, family, home, or correspondence ===
The law prohibits such actions, and the government generally respected these prohibitions in practice.

== Civil Liberties ==
=== Freedom of speech and press ===
The law prohibits neo-Nazi activity, including making statements that deny the Holocaust. On February 20, the Vienna regional court convicted British writer David Irving and sentenced him to a three years in prison on charges of neo-Nazi activity. In 1989 Irving reportedly denied the existence of gas chambers at Auschwitz and claimed that unknown individuals dressed in Sturmabteilung uniforms committed the Reichskristallnacht crimes in November 1934. On August 29, the Supreme Court confirmed the guilty-verdict. On December 20, the Vienna court of second instance suspended two thirds of Irving's three-year prison sentence. Because Irving had been in custody since November 11, 2005, he was released from prison and deported to Great Britain.

On April 26, the Vienna Criminal Court convicted John Gudenus, a former Freedom Party member of the upper house of parliament, to a one-year suspended sentence for violating the law banning neo-Nazi activity. In public interviews in 2005, Gudenus had questioned the existence of gas chambers and belittled the suffering of concentration camp inmates during the Holocaust.

The independent media were active and expressed a wide variety of views without restriction.

There were no government restrictions on access to the Internet or reports that the government monitored e-mail or Internet chat rooms. Individuals and groups could engage in the peaceful expression of views via the Internet, including electronic mail.

There were no government restrictions on academic freedom or cultural events.

=== Freedom of peaceful assembly and association ===
The law provides for freedom of assembly and association, and the government generally respected these rights in practice.

=== Freedom of religion ===
The law provides for freedom of religion, and the government generally respected this right in practice.

The law divides religious organizations into three legal categories: officially recognized religious societies, religious confessional communities, and associations. Numerous unrecognized religious groups have complained that the law obstructs legitimate claims for recognition and relegates them to second-class status. As of December the European Court of Human Rights had not ruled on a 2003 complaint by the Jehovah's Witnesses challenging the legality of the requirement that a group must exist for 10 years in the country before it can be recognized by the government.

The conservative Austrian People's Party (ÖVP) denied party membership to members of unrecognized religious groups, which it considered "sects," that hold a view of mankind fundamentally different from the party's, advocate opinions irreconcilable with the ÖVP's ethical principles, or reject basic rights granted by "progressively minded" constitutional states and in an open society. The ÖVP denied membership to members of the Church of Scientology.

The city of Vienna funded a counseling center of a controversial NGO, the Society Against Sect and Cult Dangers (GSK), which actively worked against alleged sects and cults. GSK distributed information to schools and the general public and offered counseling to persons who believe that sects and cults had hurt their lives.

The Federal Office of Sect Issues functioned as a counseling center for those who had questions about sects and cults. While the office is legally independent of the government, the minister for social security and generations appointed and supervised its director. Some members of the public believed the office of sect issues and similar government offices fostered societal discrimination against unrecognized religious groups.

There was some societal discrimination against members of unrecognized religious groups, particularly those considered to be "cults" or "sects." The majority of these groups have less than 100 members. The Church of Scientology and the Unification Church were among the larger unrecognized groups.

Muslims complained about incidents of societal discrimination and verbal harassment, including occasional incidences of discrimination against Muslim women wearing headscarves in public. On April 9, an unknown person conducted an arson attack against the construction site of an Islamic Cemetery in Vienna. The attack coincided with the conclusion of a conference of European imams in Vienna. On September 11, police destroyed a suspicious device, which turned out to be a fake bomb, in front of the Muslim Youth office in Vienna. On November 7, police arrested a 29-year-old Muslim man on charges of placing the fake bomb.

The Jewish community has approximately 7,700 members. During the year the NGO Forum Against Anti-Semitism reported a total of 125 antisemitic incidents, including physical attacks, name-calling, graffiti or defacement, threatening letters, antisemitic Internet postings, property damage, and vilifying letters and telephone calls.

On 26 November 2006, a 24-year-old Croatian man went on a rampage in the Jewish Lauder Chabad School, breaking windows, glass doors, and showcases with an iron rod. Police later arrested him.

The European Union Monitoring Center on Racism and Xenophobia declared that antisemitism in the country was characterized by diffuse and traditional antisemitic stereotypes rather than by acts of physical aggression.

The law prohibits any form of neo-Nazism or antisemitism or any activity in the spirit of Nazism. It also prohibits public denial, belittlement, approval, or justification of Nazi crimes, including the Holocaust. The law prohibits public incitement to hostile acts, insult, contempt against a church or religious society, or public incitement against a group based on race, nationality, or ethnicity, if that incitement poses a danger to public order. The government strictly enforced the law against neo-Nazi activity. The Vienna Jewish community's offices and other Jewish community institutions in the country, such as schools and museums, were under police protection.

Secondary school history and civics courses discussed the Holocaust. Religious education classes taught the tenets of different religions and fostered overall tolerance. The education ministry offered special teacher training seminars on the subject of Holocaust education. An education ministry program routinely invited Holocaust survivors to speak to classes about Nazism and the Holocaust.

=== Freedom of movement within the country, foreign travel, emigration, and repatriation ===
The law provides for these rights, and the government generally respected them in practice. The law prohibits forced exile, and the government did not use it in practice.

The law provides for the granting of asylum or refugee status in accordance with the 1951 Convention relating to the Status of Refugees and its 1967 protocol, and the government has established a system for providing protection to refugees. In practice the government provided protection against refoulement, the return of persons to a country where they feared persecution. The government granted refugee status or asylum and subscribed to a "safe country of transit" policy, which required asylum seekers who transited a country determined to be "safe" to return to that country to seek refugee status. With the expansion of the European Union (EU) this concept has lost some of its importance because upon their accession, neighboring Slovenia, the Czech Republic, the Slovak Republic, and Hungary became subject to the EU provisions that establish criteria and mechanisms for determining the EU member state responsible for examining an asylum application. In 2005 new legislation introduced stricter detention and removal policies as part of a stronger enforcement of the 2003 Dublin II regulation (also referred to as the Dublin Convention) which discourages asylum shopping by allowing serial asylum-seekers to be returned to the EU country where they first applied for asylum. EURODAC, the EU's system for comparing fingerprints of asylum-seekers and illegal immigrants, has facilitated the application of the Dublin Convention. As a result, asylum applications dropped by more than 30 percent during the year with a noticeable trend in applicants attempting to conceal their routes of transit.

The government has in the past (during the Kosovo crisis and as a result of hostilities in Afghanistan) also provided temporary protection to individuals who did not qualify as refugees under the 1951 convention or 1967 protocol under a mechanism whereby victims of armed conflict may be admitted to the country. The government cooperated with the Office of the United Nations High Commissioner for Refugees and other humanitarian organizations in assisting refugees and asylum seekers.

== Political rights ==
The law provides citizens with the right to change their government peacefully, and citizens exercised this right in practice through periodic, free, and fair elections held on the basis of universal suffrage.

In 2004 voters elected President Heinz Fischer of the SPÖ to a six-year term in national elections in which individuals could freely declare their candidacy and stand for election. In 2002 the OVP received a plurality in parliamentary elections and renewed its right-center coalition with the Freedom Party (FPÖ). In 2005 the Alliance for the Future of Austria broke away from the FPÖ, but remained a junior partner with the OVP in the coalition government. The Federal Assembly consists of the National Council and the Federal Council. There were 58 women in the 183-seat National Council and 18 women in the 62-member Federal Council. There were five women in the 14-member Council of Ministers (cabinet). Although there appeared to be relatively little minority representation at the national level, no precise information on the number of minorities in the Federal Assembly was available. Some Muslims were on party lists for the elections but were not elected into the Federal Assembly.

There were no reports of government corruption during the year. The law provides for full public access to government information, and the government generally respected these provisions in practice. Authorities can only deny access if it would violate substantial data protection rights or would involve information that is of national security interest. Petitioners could challenge denials before the Administrative Court.

== Governmental attitude regarding international and nongovernmental investigation of alleged violations of human rights ==
A number of domestic and international human rights groups generally operated without government restriction, investigating and publishing their findings on human rights cases. Government officials were somewhat cooperative and responsive to their views, but some groups were dissatisfied with the information supplied by authorities in response to specific complaints.

The Human Rights Advisory Council, composed of representatives from the justice and interior ministries and NGOs, operated to ensure that police respected human rights while carrying out their duties. However, the International Helsinki Federation for Human Rights (IHF) characterized the council as ineffective and unable to obtain the cooperation of the security services, citing that the country's criminal code was lacking severity in certain instances. According to the IHF, shoplifters were likely to receive a longer sentence than sex offenders.

The 2004 equal treatment law expanded the responsibility of the ombudsman to ensure equal opportunity in the workplace regardless of ethnic origin, religion, age, or sexual orientation, and to address general discrimination because of ethnic origin. The law went into effect in 2004, and the ombudsman began its work addressing the new grounds in March 2005; 617 complaints on the new grounds were filed in 2005.

== Discrimination, societal abuses, and trafficking in persons ==
The law provides for protection against discrimination based on race, gender, disability, language, or social status, and the government generally enforced these provisions effectively; however, violence against women, child abuse, trafficking in persons, and racial discrimination were problems.

=== Women ===
Violence against women, including spousal abuse, was a problem. The Association of Houses for Battered Women estimated that one-fifth of the country's 1.5 million adult women have suffered from violence in a relationship. However, media reports estimated that fewer than 10 percent of abused women filed complaints. The law provides that police can expel abusive male family members from family homes for up to three months, while abuse perpetrated by female family members is widely ignored. In 2005 an injunction to prevent abusive family members from returning home was applied in 5,618 cases.

The government funded privately operated intervention centers and help lines for female victims of domestic abuse only. The centers provided only for female victims' safety, assessed the threat posed by perpetrators, helped victims develop plans to stop the abuse, and provided legal counseling and other social services.

Under the law, rape, including spousal rape, is punishable with up to 15 years in prison.

In July a new law prohibiting stalking went into effect. The law provides for sentences of up to one year in prison.

Although there were no reported cases of female genital mutilation (FGM) in the country, the city of Vienna set up a counseling office in June to assist female immigrants from African countries who were victims of FGM. In 2005 the African Women's Organization (AFO) helped 899 women with various problems, among them a number of FGM cases.

Prostitution is legal; however, illegal trafficking, including for the purposes of prostitution, was a problem (see section 5, Trafficking). Laws regulating prostitution require prostitutes to register, undergo periodic health examinations, and pay taxes.

The law prohibits sexual harassment, and the government effectively enforced those laws. Of the 4,418 cases of discrimination brought to the ombudsman for equal treatment of gender in 2005, 408 involved sexual harassment. The labor court can order employers to compensate victims of sexual harassment on the basis of the Federal Equality Commission's finding on the case; the law provides that a victim is entitled to a minimum of $840 (700 euros) in financial compensation.

There are no legal restrictions on women's rights and the Federal Equality Commission and the ombudsman for equal treatment of gender oversee laws prescribing equal treatment of men and women. However, on average, women earned 83 percent of what men earned for the same work. Women were more likely than men to hold temporary positions and part-time jobs and also were disproportionately represented among those unemployed for extended periods.

Although labor laws provide for equal treatment of women in the civil service, women remained underrepresented. The law requires the government to hire women of equivalent qualifications ahead of men in all civil service areas in which less than 40 percent of the employees are women, including police. There are no penalties, however, for agencies that fail to attain the 40 percent target.

Female employees in the private sector may invoke equality laws prohibiting discrimination against women. On the basis of the Federal Equality Commission's findings, labor courts may award compensation of up to four months' salary to women who experienced discrimination in promotion because of their gender. The courts may also order compensation for women who were denied a post despite having equal qualifications.

=== Children ===
The law provides for the protection of children's rights, and the government was committed to children's rights and welfare. Each state government and the federal Ministry for Social Welfare, Generations, and Consumer Protection has an ombudsman for children and adolescents whose main function is to resolve complaints about violations of children's rights. The ombudsman provides free legal counseling to children, adolescents, and parents on a wide range of problems, including child abuse, child custody, and domestic violence.

Nine years of education is mandatory for all children beginning at age six. The government also provides free education through secondary school and subsidized technical, vocational, or university education. According to the Ministry of Education, 99.8 percent of children between the ages of six and 15 attended school. The government provided comprehensive medical care for children.

Child abuse was a problem, and the government continued its efforts to monitor abuse and prosecute offenders. The Ministry for Social Welfare, Generations, and Consumer Protection estimated that 90 percent of child abuse cases occurred within families or was committed by close family members or family friends. Law enforcement officials noted a growing readiness to report abuse cases. According to authorities, approximately 20,000 abuse incidents are reported annually in the country.

In a child abduction case that attracted international media attention, 18-year-old Natascha Kampusch escaped her abductor in September 2006 after eight years in captivity; Wolfgang Priklopil, the suspect in the case, subsequently committed suicide.

There were occasional cases of suspected child marriage, primarily in the Muslim and Romani communities. However, such cases were undocumented. Some male immigrants entered into a marriage with a teenage girl in their home country, and then returned to the country with her.

The law provides that adults having sexual intercourse with a child under 14 may be punished with a prison sentence of up to 10 years. If the victim is impregnated, the sentence may be extended to 15 years. In 2005 the Interior Ministry reported 1,314 cases of child abuse, most involving intercourse with a minor, while the Ministry of Justice reported 322 convictions. The law provides for criminal punishment for the possession, trading, and private viewing of child pornography. Exchanging pornographic videos of children is illegal.

Trafficking of children remained a problem (see Trafficking section).

=== Trafficking in persons ===
The law prohibits trafficking in persons; however, there were reports that persons were trafficked to, from, and within the country. Women were trafficked for sexual exploitation and domestic service, and children were trafficked for begging and possibly for sexual exploitation.

The law provides for the prosecution of traffickers and addresses trafficking for prostitution through deception, coercion, or the use of force; for the purposes of slavery; for the exploitation of labor; and the exploitation of aliens.

Trafficking is illegal and punishable by imprisonment for up to 10 years. In 2005 there were 168 trafficking cases involving 109 suspects and 25 convictions for human trafficking. Trafficking for purposes of slavery is punishable by imprisonment for 10–20 years. The perpetrators of human trafficking included both citizens, who were generally connected with licensed brothels, and foreign nationals, who are involved primarily with unlicensed brothels. Authorities estimated that organized crime groups from Eastern Europe controlled a large portion of human trafficking in the country. The police were also aware of cooperation between Austrian and foreign citizens in organizing the transfer of foreign prostitutes through the country.

The Interior Ministry's Federal Bureau for Criminal Affairs has a division dedicated to combating human trafficking. Law enforcement officials maintained contact with authorities in countries of origin to facilitate the prosecution of suspected traffickers. During the year there were no reports that the government extradited any persons wanted for trafficking crimes in other countries.

In January the government eliminated a "dancer" visa that had been used to traffic women into the country.

The country was a transit and destination point for women trafficked from Romania, Ukraine, Moldova, the Balkans, and, to a lesser extent, the Czech Republic, the Slovak Republic, Hungary, Belarus, and Africa. Victims were trafficked through the country to Spain, Italy, and France. Women were trafficked into the country primarily for the purpose of sexual exploitation. The International Organization for Migration (IOM) estimated that there were approximately 7,000 foreign trafficking victims in Vienna alone. Women also were trafficked from Asia and Latin America for domestic labor. In 2005, following extensive efforts by the government in cooperation with Bulgarian authorities, police noted a decrease in the trafficking of Bulgarian children for the purposes of begging and stealing, and sometimes sexual exploitation.

While there were no accurate statistics on the number of trafficking victims, the NGO Lateinamerikanische Frauen in Oesterreich - Interventionsstelle fuer Betroffene des Frauenhandels reported assisting 151 trafficking victims in 2005, down from 167 victims in 2004. Both citizens and foreigners were engaged in trafficking. The country was attractive to traffickers because of its geographic location and because it does not require entry visas for citizens of the Czech Republic, the Slovak Republic, Hungary, Romania, and Bulgaria.

Most trafficked women were brought to the country with promises of unskilled jobs, such as nannies or waitresses. Upon arrival they were often coerced into prostitution. According to police, there also were cases of women who knowingly entered the country to work as prostitutes, but were forced into dependency akin to slavery. Most victims were in the country illegally and feared being turned into authorities and deported. Traffickers usually retained victims' official documents, including passports, to maintain control over them. Trafficking victims reported being subjected to threats and physical violence. A major deterrent to victim cooperation was widespread fear of retribution, both in the country and in the victims' countries of origin.

The government provided temporary residence, limited to the duration of the trial, to trafficking victims who were prepared to testify or who intended to file civil lawsuits. However, victims rarely agreed to testify due to fear of retribution. Victims have the possibility of continued residence if they meet the criteria for residence permits.

LEFOE provided secure housing and other support for trafficking victims. The IOM also sought to put victims in contact with NGOs in their countries of origin upon their return. With financial assistance from the Interior Ministry, LEFOE continued to operate a center in Vienna that provided psychological, legal, and health-related assistance, emergency housing, and German language courses to trafficked women. Federal and local governments funded NGOs that provided assistance in other cities.

The government worked with international organizations to carry out prevention programs throughout the region. The government funded research on trafficking, and NGOs produced antitrafficking brochures, law enforcement workshops, and international conferences funded with the help of private donors.

=== Persons with disabilities ===
The law protects persons with physical and mental disabilities from discrimination in housing, education, employment, and access to health care and other government services, and the government generally enforced these provisions effectively. There were no reports of societal discrimination against persons with disabilities.

Federal law mandates access to public buildings for persons with physical disabilities; however, many public buildings are inaccessible to persons with disabilities due to insufficient enforcement of the law and low penalties for noncompliance.

The law provides for involuntary sterilization of adults with mental disabilities in cases where a pregnancy would be considered life-threatening. However, no involuntary sterilizations have been performed in recent years. The law prohibits the sterilization of minors.

The government funded a wide range of programs for persons with disabilities, including provision of transportation, assistance integrating school children with disabilities into regular classes, and assistance integrating employees with disabilities into the workplace.

=== National, racial, and ethnic minorities ===
In 2005, the Ministry of the Interior recorded 209 incidents of neo-Nazi, right-wing extremist and xenophobic incidents against members of minority groups. The government continued to express concern over the activities of far-right skinheads and neo-Nazis, many with links to organizations in other countries.

A 2005 report by the domestic NGO Zivilcourage und Anti-Rassismus Arbeit, in conjunction with other groups, found that persons from diverse ethnic and racial backgrounds faced increasing discrimination from government officials, particularly the police, as well as in the workplace and in housing. The report cited 1,105 cases of alleged racial discrimination in 2005. The government continued training programs to combat racism and educate the police in cultural sensitivity. In September the Ministry of Interior renewed an agreement with the Anti-Defamation League to teach police officers cultural sensitivity, religious tolerance, and the acceptance of minorities.

Human rights groups reported that Roma faced discrimination in employment and housing. The situation of the Romani community, estimated at over 6,200 autochthonous (indigenous) and 15,000 to 20,000 non-autochthonous Roma, has significantly improved in recent years, according to the head of the Austrian Roma Cultural Association. Government programs, including providing financing for tutors, have helped school age Romani children move out of "special needs" and into mainstream classes. The government also initiated programs in recent years to compensate Romani Holocaust victims and to document the suffering of the Roma during the Holocaust.

NGOs complained that Africans living in the country experienced verbal harassment in public. In some cases, black Africans were stigmatized as being involved in the drug trade and other illegal activities.

According to the IHF, the issue regarding full recognition of Slovenes remained problematic. For example, the governor of the province of Carinthia refused to implement rulings by higher courts that gave certain rights to the Slovene minority.

The law recognizes Croats, Czechs, Hungarians, Roma, Slovaks, and Slovenes as national minority groups and requires any community, where at least 25 percent of the population belongs to one of these groups, to provide bilingual town signs, education, media, and access to federal funds earmarked for such minorities. The law affects 148 communities. At year's end the government had not reached a decision on implementation of a 2001 Constitutional Court ruling on lowering the 25 percent threshold. The law does not provide these rights to other minority groups, such as Turks, which the government does not recognize as indigenous minorities. However, the government provided a wide range of language and job promotion courses. In December the Constitutional Court ruled that the state of Carinthia must install additional bilingual town signs in German and Slovene.

== Worker rights ==
The law provides workers the right to form and join unions without prior authorization or excessive requirements, and workers exercised this right in practice. No workers were prohibited from joining unions. An estimated 47 percent of the work force was organized into 13 national unions belonging to the Austrian Trade Union Federation (OGB).

The law allows unions to conduct their activities without interference, and the government protected this right in practice. Collective bargaining is protected in law and was freely practiced. Approximately 80 percent of the workforce was under a collective bargaining agreement; the OGB was exclusively responsible for collective bargaining. The law does not explicitly provide for the right to strike; however, the government recognized the right in practice. The law prohibits retaliation against strikers, and the government effectively enforced the law. There are no export processing zones.

The law prohibits forced or compulsory labor, including by children; however, there were reports that such practices occurred (see Trafficking section).

There are laws and policies to protect children from exploitation in the workplace, and the government generally enforced these laws and policies effectively. The minimum legal working age is 15 years. The Labor Inspectorate of the Ministry of Social Affairs effectively enforced this law. There were reports of trafficking of children for begging and sexual exploitation (see Trafficking section).

There is no legislated national minimum wage. Instead, nationwide collective bargaining agreements set minimum wages by job classification for each industry. The accepted unofficial annual minimum wage is $14,880 to $17,360 (12,000 to 14,000 euros), and it provided a decent standard of living for a worker and family. An estimated 10,000 to 20,000 workers had salaries below this level. The law limits standard working hours to eight hours per day and up to 40 hours per week. The standard workday may be extended to 10 hours as long as the weekly maximum is not exceeded. The law requires compulsory time off on weekends and official holidays. An employee must have at least 11 hours off between workdays. Authorities effectively enforce these provisions. The law limits overtime to five hours per week plus up to 60 hours per year; however, authorities did not enforce these laws and regulations effectively, and some employers exceeded legal limits on compulsory overtime. Collective bargaining agreements may provide for higher limits.

The Labor Inspectorate regularly enforces laws that provide for mandatory occupational health and safety standards. Workers may file complaints anonymously with the Labor Inspectorate, which may bring suit against the employer on behalf of the employee. However, workers rarely exercised this option and normally relied instead on the chambers of labor, which filed suits on their behalf. The law provides that workers have the right to remove themselves from a job if they fear serious, immediate danger to life and health without incurring any prejudice to their job or career, and the government effectively enforced this law.

== See also ==
Austria specific

- Capital punishment in Austria
- Freedom of religion in Austria
- Human trafficking in Austria
- Internet censorship and surveillance in Austria
- LGBT rights in Austria

General

- Human rights
- Fundamental rights
- Minority rights
- International human rights instruments
- List of human rights organisations
