= Human rights in Central Asia =

The situation of human rights in Central Asia varies little between the region's countries, but are often reported to be a cause of concern among many outsider observers, governmental and non-governmental. Some of the legacy of human rights in the region derives from its history as part of the Soviet Union.

== Regions ==
See the following for more details on each country:

- Afghanistan
- China
- Kazakhstan
- Kyrgyzstan
- Mongolia
- Pakistan
- Russia
- Tajikistan
- Turkmenistan
- Uzbekistan

== See also ==
- Human rights in East Asia
- Human rights in Europe
- Human rights in the United Kingdom
- Human rights in the United States
