= Austrian litigation association of NGOs against discrimination =

Umbrella organisation committed to combating discrimination

The Austrian Litigation Association of NGOs against discrimination (de:Klagsverband) is an umbrella organisation of 13 (March 2009) organisations committed to combatting discrimination on the grounds of sex/gender, ethnic origin, religion and belief, disability, sexual orientation and age. It seems unique that organisations dealing with all grounds participate. The organisation is not profit-minded but strives to implement the rights of those who suffer discrimination. Additionally, the recognition of the role of NGOs to the further development of the legislation and judicial practice concerning discrimination should be promoted and enforced in the public.

The main work of the Litigation Association is to consult its members and the clients of those NGOs as well as to send advisory experts to the Commission on Equal Treatment.

Thanks to § 62 of the Equal Treatment Act (GlBG) which provides for the possibility to intervene in favour of plaintiffs, the Klagsverband attends victims of indirect or direct discrimination in the litigation. This additional legal protection exists with regard to discrimination at work as well as in other situation like the access to services and goods (housing, access to restaurants and clubs, travel, …).

Finally, the Klagsverband is part of a wide network of organisations and provides these contacts to victims of discrimination.

These organisations are (as at March 2024)

AIDS Help Vienna, Amnesty International Austria, Anti-discrimination office in the city of Salzburg, Styria Anti-Discrimination Agency, bad SODIT, atempo, Austrian Gay Professionals (AGPRO), Advice center for migrants, BICEPS – Center for Self-Determined Living, Consulting, Mobility and Competence Center (BMKz), Association of the Blind and Visually Impaired Austria – Umbrella Association (BSVÖ), There – umbrella organization for professional integration Austria, Documentary section Islamophobia and anti-Muslim racism, Down syndrome Austria, Marriage without borders, equalizent ( supporting member ), FAmOS, primer, WOMEN’S SERVICE Graz, Friends of the Assistance Dogs of Europe, Equal Treatment Body of the State of Carinthia (executive member) Equal Treatment Officer of the City of Graz (supporting member), HOSI Salzburg, Helping Hands Graz, Homosexual Initiative Vienna (HOSI Vienna), IGASUS, Integration Tyrol, Integration Vienna, Integration House (associate member), ISOP – Innovative Social Projects, IVMB, the lawyers, crack: point – self-determined life in Salzburg, LEFÖ – advice, education and support for migrant women, LOC, Lungau women's network, maiz – Autonomous center of and for migrant women, migrare – Center for Migrants Upper Austria, Lower Austrian Anti-Discrimination Agency (associate member), Lower Austrian poverty network, Ninlil, Austrian Association of the Deaf (ÖGLB), Austrian platform for single parents, Austrian Association of the Hard of Hearing Umbrella Association (ÖSB), ÖZIV Burgenland, ÖZIV Tyrol, Peregrina – education, counseling and therapy center for immigrant women, Human Rights Platform Salzburg, QueerBase, Queer Business Women (QBW), Self-determined life in Innsbruck, Self-determined life Austria, Sel-determined life in Styria, SUM, SOPHIE – educational space for prostitutes, SOS – Human Rights Austria, Social platform Upper Austria, Office for Combating Discrimination Vienna (supporting member), Tyrolean service center for equal treatment and anti-discrimination ( sponsoring member ), TransX – Association for TransGender People, uniability, Venib – Non-Binary Association, Representative network, VIMÖ – Association of Intersex People Austria, WAG assistance cooperative, Vienna Forum for Democracy and Human Rights, ZARA – civil courage and anti-racism work, ZEBRA, Center for Migrants in Tyrol (ZeMiT)
