= Human rights in Germany =

Human rights in Germany enjoy a high level of protection, both in theory and in practice, and are enshrined in the Grundgesetz. The country has ratified most international human rights treaties. Reports from independent organizations such as Amnesty International certify a high level of compliance with human rights, while others, like the researcher Tobias Singelnstein, point out several issues, in particular police brutality and mistreatment of refugees. The 2008 Freedom in the World report by US-funded Freedom House gives Germany a score of "1" (the best possible) for both political rights and civil liberties.

== Law ==
The constitution of Germany, the Grundgesetz, which came into effect on May 23, 1949, puts a particular emphasis on human rights. Its first sentence, "Human dignity is inviolable", is being interpreted as protecting the sum of human rights. This paragraph is protected by an "eternity clause" and cannot be changed. It has wide-ranging effects on judicial practice; for example, it has been used to justify the right on Informational self-determination in a 1983 finding of the Federal Constitutional Court of Germany.

However, following experiences from the Weimar Republic, Germany sees itself as a wehrhafte Demokratie (fortified democracy); actions targeted towards removing the democratic order are not covered by human rights.

The constitution guarantees all rights from the Universal Declaration of Human Rights (which itself is not legally binding), with the exception of an unlimited right for asylum.

The ratification of the European Convention on Human Rights allows citizens to appeal to the European Court of Human Rights.

Mandatory military service for male citizens was established in 1956. At any time, conscientious objectors can opt to do Zivildienst (civilian service) instead. For the time of both services, some human rights such as freedom of movement are suspended. Since 1 July 2011, the government no longer has the ability to exercise the right under this article, that is, military service is currently de facto voluntary in Germany. However, there are no plans to abolish laws allowing conscription. As a reaction to Russia's war of aggression against Ukraine, the German government introduced a draft bill in August 2025 that would allow sending a questionnaire to all 18 year olds regarding their willingness to join the military. Only men would be legally required to answer the questionnaire.

== Treaties ==
UN core treaties	Participation of Germany	CoE core treaties	Participation of Germany
Convention on the Elimination of All Forms of Racial Discrimination	Ratified in 1969	European Convention on Human Rights	Ratified in 1952
International Covenant on Civil and Political Rights	Ratified in 1973	Protocol 1 (ECHR)	Ratified in 1957
First Optional Protocol (ICCPR)	Accession in 1993	Protocol 4 (ECHR)	Ratified in 1968
Second Optional Protocol (ICCPR)	Ratified in 1992	Protocol 6 (ECHR)	Ratified in 1989
International Covenant on Economic, Social and Cultural Rights	Ratified in 1973	Protocol 7 (ECHR)	Signed in 1985
Convention on the Elimination of All Forms of Discrimination Against Women	Ratified in 1985	Protocol 12 (ECHR)	Signed in 2000
Optional Protocol (CEDAW)	Ratified in 2002	Protocol 13 (ECHR)	Ratified in 2004
United Nations Convention Against Torture	Ratified in 1990	European Social Charter	Ratified in 1965
Optional Protocol (CAT)	Ratified in 2008	Additional Protocol of 1988 (ESC)	Signed in 1988
Convention on the Rights of the Child	Ratified in 1992	Additional Protocol of 1995 (ESC)	Not signed
Optional Protocol on the Involvement of Children in Armed Conflict (CRC)	Ratified in 2004	Revised European Social Charter	Signed in 2007
Optional Protocol on the sale of children, child prostitution and child pornography (CRC)	Ratified in 2009	European Convention for the Prevention of Torture and Inhuman or Degrading Treatment or Punishment	Ratified in 1990
Convention on the Protection of the Rights of All Migrant Workers and Members of Their Families	Not signed	European Charter for Regional or Minority Languages	Ratified in 1998
Convention on the Rights of Persons with Disabilities	Ratified in 2009	Framework Convention for the Protection of National Minorities	Ratified in 1997
Optional Protocol (CRPD)	Ratified in 2009	Convention on Action against Trafficking in Human Beings	Signed in 2005
United Nations Convention against Corruption	Signed in 2014	Legally binding multilateral UN anti-corruption instrument	Signed in 2003

Germany is also a member of the United Nations Human Rights Council. It recognizes the jurisdiction of the International Criminal Court.

== Reports ==
The Amnesty International reports of 2005 and 2006 mainly criticize—though rarely occurring and mostly severely punished—some cases of police brutality, mistreatment of refugees, and racist attacks.

The 2008 Freedom in the World report by US-funded Freedom House gives Germany a score of "1" (the best possible) for both political rights and civil liberties.

The US State Department's human rights report for 2025 found that the human rights situation in Germany had deteriorated significantly over the past year. It cited “serious human rights violations,” including “restrictions on freedom of expression and credible reports of crimes, violence, or threats of violence motivated by anti-Semitism.” In other countries such as El Salvador, the report states that there have been “no credible reports of serious human rights violations,” meaning that the situation in Germany is considered to be significantly worse than in El Salvador.

== Topics ==
=== Custody ===
Remand must be ordered by a judge. Usually, a suspect cannot be detained for more than six months without a conviction.

The death penalty is abolished. A court may order that a person be detained indefinitely even after the sentence is completed, if the person is convicted of particularly serious crimes and is judged, after expert testimony, to be a danger to the public (Sicherungsverwahrung).

The German citizen Khalid El-Masri was abducted by the CIA in 2005 and interned without trial for months, although innocent. German intelligence was informed early about this, but undertook nothing, which was subject to an intense political debate.

=== Freedom of speech ===
Freedom of speech is guaranteed by the constitution. However, Volksverhetzung (incitement of the people) is a crime, defined as spreading hate against or insult against a part of the population. In 1994, a paragraph explicitly forbidding denial of Nazi crimes was added.

=== Freedom of assembly ===
Open-air public rallies require (generally) prior announcement to the local authorities, but no permits. Local authorities can prohibit rallies only on grounds of public safety concerns or involvement of outlawed organizations.

=== Freedom of press ===
Freedom of press is generally established in Germany; the 2009 Press Freedom Index of Reporters Without Borders rates Germany at place 18 of 175 countries.

The most notable incident involving free press restrictions was the Spiegel scandal of 1962, when the Minister of Defense Franz Josef Strauß ordered the unlawful arrest of several journalists after an article accusing him of bribery. The scandal led to the dismissial of Strauß from office and severely damaged the reputation of Chancellor Konrad Adenauer.

In 2005, minister of the interior Otto Schily authorized a raid of offices of the periodical Cicero, which was criticized as an attack on press freedom by part of the German press. The raid was based on a substantiated suspicion of leaking of state secrets. However, on February 27, 2007, the Federal Constitutional Court ruled that suspicion that a journalist is aiding the betrayal of state secrets is not sufficient to warrant a search, and thus the raid was illegal. The finding has been widely regarded as a strengthening of press freedom.

A scandal regarding spying on journalists by the secret service Bundesnachrichtendienst, starting in May 2006, has not been cleared up yet.

=== Police brutality ===
Especially because of experiences through the Nazi-regime, the German politics and people are attentive to the power and way of working of the police. In Germany the use of firearms—even by the police—is strictly regulated and there are (compared with other countries) only a few cases of shots fired by the police every year. However, there were some incidents in the last past years:

On 5 March 2009 a man died in a hospital after falling into a coma while in police custody in Hagen on 17 February where he had been bound face-down. The Office of the Public Prosecutor terminated its investigations and found that the force used by the police was proportionate, despite the fact that since 2000, police officers have been trained not to restrain a person face-down because of the danger of asphyxia.

In December 2008, the regional court of Dessau acquitted two police officers of killing Oury Jalloh as a result of negligence. Oury Jalloh had died 2005 when a fire broke out in his cell, where he was restrained to the bed. In its oral reasons for the judgment, the court stated lack of evidence as the reason for the acquittal, and strongly criticized the testimonies of most of the police officers who were witnesses in the court case. On 13 December 2012, the regional court of Magdeburg overruled the earlier acquittal, and ruled for negligent homicide. An earlier accusation of bodily harm with fatal consequences was dropped by the public prosecution for lack of evidence. The accused officer was condemned to a fine of 10,800 Euro by the court, in excess of the 6,300 Euro plead for by prosecution.

=== Torture ===
There are no reports on systematic use of torture in Germany. However, there were some related incidents.

In 2002, Frankfurt's police vice president Wolfgang Daschner ordered a subordinate officer to threaten the suspect of a kidnapping to use force in order to get information on the whereabouts of the abductee (the abductee was killed shortly after the kidnapping, but the suspect told the police that the child was still alive, and Daschner decided to break the law to save the child's life. Daschner himself wrote down an official note of his actions). This triggered an emotional debate over the legality of such measures. Daschner was convicted to the lowest possible penalty of a fine. Daschner and the subordinate officer remained in duty.

In a trial against terror suspect Mounir El Motassadeq, a court used evidence provided by US authorities, despite widespread evidence of torture in US detainment camps. The conviction was rejected in appeal due to lack of evidence. In January 2007 he was condemned for 15 years in detention.

Forced psychiatric interventions have repeatedly been reported by Psychiatric Survivor activists to be inhumane, meeting the criteria of and being experienced as torture. In 2011 and 2012, the German Federal Constitutional Court and the Federal Court of Justice clarified that there has never been any sufficient legal basis for compulsory treatment as practiced until then. Under the protests of human rights activists who were supported by sociologist Prof. Wolf-Dieter Narr, the German Government and successively also the federal state governments started working towards a quick legalization of involuntary treatment. By the time the first of these laws were enacted, the Special Rapporteur on torture or other cruel, inhuman or degrading treatment or punishment of the United Nations Human Rights Council, Juan E. Méndez, reported on abusive practises in health care settings worldwide and the policies that promote these practises. He stated that:

"both this mandate and United Nations treaty bodies have established that involuntary treatment and other psychiatric interventions in health-care facilities are forms of torture and ill-treatment" and that "it is essential that an absolute ban on all coercive and non-consensual measures, including restraint and solitary confinement of people with psychological or intellectual disabilities, should apply"

=== Surveillance ===
Several parties, such as the right-wing "National Democratic Party of Germany" (NPD) and the communist platform of the Left Party, are under surveillance from the Verfassungsschutz ("Federal Office for the Protection of the Constitution"). The use of police informers has sometimes been criticized as excessive. A motion to label the NPD as an illegal organization was abandoned, because it became apparent that a number of actions of the NPD were actually controlled by the Verfassungsschutz. In addition to parties, the German Government placed the Church of Scientology and its members in Germany under surveillance by the Verfassungsschutz since 1997 for the alleged goal of abolishing the order based on the German Grundgesetz. See also: Scientology in Germany.

== Vulnerable populations ==
=== Minority and foreign parents ===
Ethnic minorities are underrepresented in the political process and in public life, especially the civil service. There were some cases of attacks on minorities in the country by right-wing groups, although Germany is—especially because of its past—very considerate on tolerance and integration. In 2010 the US State Department reported that "right-wing extremist violence and harassment of racial minorities and foreigners were problems”.

=== Human trafficking ===
There has been a growing awareness of human trafficking as a human rights issue in Europe (see main article: trafficking in human beings). The end of communism and collapse of the Soviet Union and Yugoslavia has contributed to an increase in human trafficking, with the majority of victims being women forced into prostitution. Germany is a transit and destination country for persons, primarily women, trafficked mainly from Central and Eastern Europe and from Africa for the purpose of sexual exploitation. Russia alone accounted for one-quarter of the 1,235 identified victims reported in 2003, the latest year for which statistics are available. For the first time, Germany's statistics included German nationals who numbered 127.

=== LGBT rights ===
Lesbian, gay, bisexual and transgender (LGBT) rights in Germany have evolved significantly over the course of the last decades. As of June 29, 2017, Germany legalized same-sex marriage, which provides the same rights as opposite-sex married couples receive. Same-sex step adoption has also been legal since 2005 and was expanded in 2013 to allow someone in a same-sex relationship to adopt a child already adopted by their partner; however, joint adoption has not yet been legislated. Discrimination protections on the basis of sexual orientation and gender identity vary across Germany, but discrimination in employment and the provision of goods and services is in principle banned countrywide. Transgender people have been allowed to change their legal gender since 1980. The law initially required them to undergo surgical alteration of their genitals in order to have key identity documents changed. This has since been declared unconstitutional.

=== Intersex rights ===
Intersex people in Germany have no recognition of their rights to physical integrity and bodily autonomy, and no specific protections from discrimination on the basis of sex characteristics. In response to an inquiry by the German Ethics Council in 2012, the government passed legislation in 2013 designed to classify some intersex infants to a de facto third category. The legislation has been criticized by civil society and human rights organizations as misguided.

Research published in 2016 found no substantive reduction in numbers of intersex medical interventions on infants and children with intersex conditions in the period from 2005 to 2014. The United Nations and Amnesty International have joined local intersex civil society organizations in calling for protections.

== See also ==
- Antiziganism
- Environmental racism in Europe
- Nazi Germany
