= Keo Remy =

Cambodian politician

Keo Remy (Khmer: កែវ រ៉េមី, born September 13, 1963) is a Cambodian politician who is currently the Senior Minister in charge of human rights, Chairman of the Cambodia Human Rights Committee, Permanent Vice-chairman of the Royal Government Task Force on the Extraordinary Chambers in the Courts of Cambodia, and a Member of the National Council for the Anti-Corruption Unit. He is a member of the Cambodian People's Party. Prior to becoming a Senior Minister, Remy was a Delegate Minister attached to the Prime Minister, a Secretary of State at the Office of the Council of Ministers, and a Member of Parliament for two terms. He was featured in Joshua Kurlantzick's Charm Offensive: How China's Soft Power is Transforming the World.
