= ASEAN Human Rights Declaration =

ASEAN Declaration of Human Rights
- Created: 18 November 2012
- Location: 21st ASEAN Summit in Phnom Penh, Cambodia
- Author: ASEAN Intergovernmental Commission on Human Rights
- Subject: Human rights

In 2009, the Association of Southeast Asian Nations (ASEAN) established the ASEAN Intergovernmental Commission on Human Rights to promote human rights in the ten ASEAN countries. By mid-2012, the Commission had drafted the ASEAN Human Rights Declaration. The Declaration was adopted unanimously by ASEAN members at its 18 November 2012 meeting in Phnom Penh, Cambodia. The Declaration details ASEAN nations' commitment to human rights for its 600 million people. The Declaration includes 40 paragraphs under 6 headings.

Multiple Asian declarations have been made prior to the ASEAN declaration in 2012. The first declaration in Asia to involve multiple nations throughout the region was a Southeast Asian declaration called the Declaration of the Basic Duties of ASEAN Peoples and Governments in 1983, which was first drafted by the father of human rights in the Philippines, Sen. Jose W. Diokno. Eventually the evolution of these documents lead to the current one adopted by ASEAN beginning 2012. The first five Articles of the ASEAN Human Rights declaration affirm that human rights belong to "Every person," specifically emphasizing that they belong to "women, children, the elderly, persons with disabilities, migrant workers, and vulnerable and marginalised groups (Art 5). Article 10 directly affirms "all the civil and political rights in the Universal Declaration of Human Rights," and these are detailed in Articles 11- 25. Article 26 next affirms "all the economic, social and cultural rights in the Universal Declaration...," with these described in Articles 27 to 34. The ASEAN Human Rights Declaration goes beyond the Universal Declaration by making explicit "the right to safe drinking water and sanitation" (Art. 28. e.), "the right to a safe, clean and sustainable environment" (Art 28.f.), protection from discrimination in treatment for "people suffering from communicable diseases, including HIV/AIDS" (Art. 29), the "right to development ... aimed at poverty alleviation, the creation of conditions including the protection and sustainability of the environment...(Art. 36), and the right to peace (Art. 30).

However, the Commission has been widely criticized for the lack of transparency and failure to consult with ASEAN civil society during drafting process. The Declaration itself has been criticized by ASEAN civil society, international human rights organizations such as Amnesty International and Human Rights Watch, the U.S. Department of State, and the UN High Commissioner for Human Rights. Human Rights Watch described it as a "declaration of government powers disguised as a declaration of human rights". ASEAN civil societies have noted that "The Declaration fails to include several key basic rights and fundamental freedoms, including the right to freedom of association and the right to be free from enforced disappearance." Further, the Declaration contains clauses that many fear could be used to undermine human rights, such as “the realization of human rights must be considered in the regional and national context” (Art. 7), or that human rights might be limited to preserve "national security" or a narrowly defined “public morality” (Art. 8).

The U.S. Department of State and the United Nations High Commissioner for Human Rights welcomed the Declaration, but with substantive reservations. The U.S. State Department issued a statement of support, "in principle," for "ASEAN's efforts to develop a regional human rights declaration," but expressing concern for "the use of the concept of 'cultural relativism' ..., stipulating that domestic laws can trump universal human rights, incomplete descriptions that are mentioned elsewhere, introducing novel limits to rights, and language that could be read to suggest that individual rights are subject to group veto." The U.N. High Commissioner for Human Rights "welcomed the renewed commitment by leaders of the Association of Southeast Asian Nations to universal human rights norms" noting that "Other regions have shown how regional human rights systems can evolve and improve over time" and that "it is essential that ASEAN ensures that any language inconsistent with international human rights standards does not become a part of any binding regional human rights convention.”

== See also ==
1. ASEAN Intergovernmental Commission on Human Rights
2. Universal Declaration of Human Rights
