= Outline of South America =

Hierarchical outline list of articles related to South America

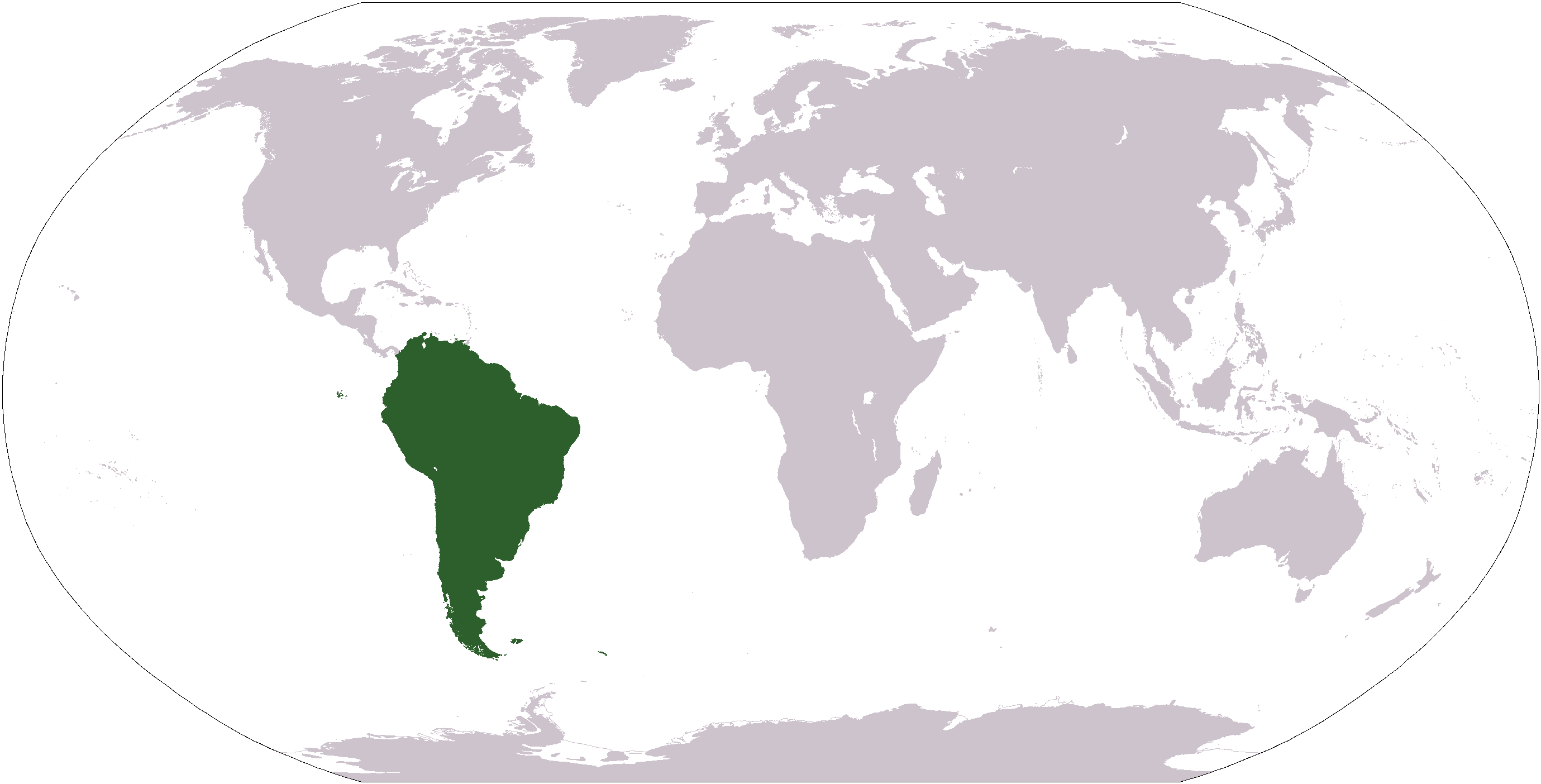

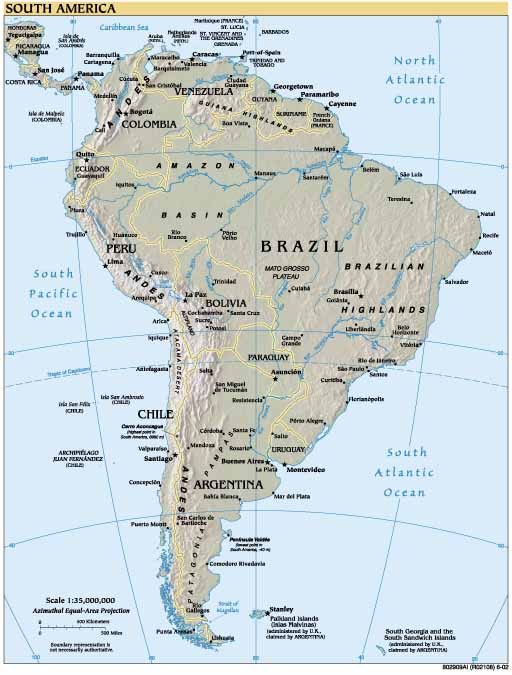

The following outline is provided as an overview of and topical guide to South America.

South America is the southern continent of the two Americas, situated entirely in the Western Hemisphere and mostly (about 3/4) in the Southern Hemisphere. It lies between the Pacific and Atlantic oceans. The continent is culturally, ethnically and racially diverse, home to indigenous peoples and to descendants of settlers from Europe, Africa and Asia. Due to its history of colonialism most South Americans speak Spanish or Portuguese, and its societies and states are commonly modeled after Western traditions.

== Geography of South America ==
=== Geography by political division ===
==== Geography of countries ====
- Geography of Argentina
- Geography of Bolivia
- Geography of Brazil
- Geography of Chile
- Geography of Colombia
- Geography of Ecuador
- Geography of Guyana
- Geography of Panama
- Geography of Paraguay
- Geography of Peru
- Geography of Suriname
- Geography of Trinidad and Tobago
- Geography of Uruguay
- Geography of Venezuela

==== Geography of dependencies and other territories ====
- Geography of Aruba
- Geography of Bonaire
- Geography of Curaçao
- Geography of the Falkland Islands
- Geography of French Guiana
- Geography of South Georgia and the South Sandwich Islands

=== Geographical features of South America ===
- List of islands of South America
- List of rivers of South America
- List of World Heritage Sites in South America

=== Regions of South America ===
==== Directional regions ====
- Eastern South America: Federative Republic of Brazil
- Northern South America (the part of South America located in the Northern Hemisphere)
  - North-eastern South America: The Guianas
  - North-western South America: Caribbean South America
- Southern South America: Southern Cone
- Western South America: Andean States

==== Natural regions ====
- Altiplano
- Amazon basin
- Amazon rainforest
  - Brazilian Amazon
  - Peruvian Amazon
- Andes
  - Tropical Andes
  - Dry Andes
  - Wet Andes
- Atacama Desert
- Brazilian Highlands
- Caribbean South America
- Gran Chaco
- Guianas
- Llanos
- Pampas
- Pantanal
- Patagonia
- Tierra del Fuego
- Atlantic Forest
- Caatinga
- Cerrado
- Chiquitano dry forests

=== Political divisions of South America ===
==== Countries of South America ====
List of South American countries

- Argentina
- Bolivia
- Brazil
- Chile
- Colombia
- Ecuador
- Guyana
- Panama
- Paraguay
- Peru
- Suriname
- Trinidad and Tobago
- Uruguay
- Venezuela

==== Dependencies and other territories ====
- Aruba
- Bonaire
- Curaçao
- Falkland Islands
- French Guiana
- South Georgia and the South Sandwich Islands

==== Regions by country ====
- Regions of Argentina
- Regions of Bolivia
- Regions of Brazil
- Regions of Chile
- Regions of Colombia
- Regions of Ecuador
- Regions of Guyana
- Regions of Paraguay
- Regions of Peru
- Regions of Suriname
- Regions of Trinidad and Tobago
- Regions of Uruguay
- Regions of Venezuela

=== Demography of South America ===
Demographics of South America

- List of South American countries by population
- List of South American countries by GDP PPP

==== Demographics by political division ====
===== Demographics of countries =====
- Demographics of Argentina
- Demographics of Bolivia
- Demographics of Brazil
- Demographics of Chile
- Demographics of Colombia
- Demographics of Ecuador
- Demographics of Guyana
- Demographics of Panama
- Demographics of Paraguay
- Demographics of Peru
- Demographics of Suriname
- Demographics of Trinidad and Tobago
- Demographics of Uruguay
- Demographics of Venezuela

===== Demographics of dependencies and other territories =====
- Demographics of Aruba
- Demographics of Bonaire
- Demographics of Curaçao
- Demographics of the Falkland Islands
- Demographics of French Guiana
- Demographics of South Georgia and the South Sandwich Islands

== Politics of South America ==
- Conflicts in South America
- Political parties in South America

=== Politics by political division ===
==== Politics of countries ====
- Politics of Argentina
- Politics of Bolivia
- Politics of Brazil
- Politics of Chile
- Politics of Colombia
- Politics of Ecuador
- Politics of Guyana
- Politics of Panama
- Politics of Paraguay
- Politics of Peru
- Politics of Suriname
- Politics of Trinidad and Tobago
- Politics of Uruguay
- Politics of Venezuela

==== Politics of dependencies and other territories ====
- Politics of Aruba
- Politics of Bonaire
- Politics of Curaçao
- Politics of the Falkland Islands
- Politics of French Guiana
- Politics of South Georgia and the South Sandwich Islands

==== Elections by political division ====
===== Elections in countries =====
- Elections in Argentina
- Elections in Bolivia
- Elections in Brazil
- Elections in Chile
- Elections in Colombia
- Elections in Ecuador
- Elections in Guyana
- Elections in Panama
- Elections in Paraguay
- Elections in Peru
- Elections in Suriname
- Elections in Trinidad and Tobago
- Elections in Uruguay
- Elections in Venezuela

===== Elections in dependencies and other territories =====
- Elections in Aruba
- Elections in Bonaire
- Elections in Curaçao
- Elections in the Falkland Islands
- Elections in French Guiana
- Elections in South Georgia and the South Sandwich Islands

==== Human rights by political division ====
===== Human rights in countries =====
- Human rights in Argentina
- Human rights in Bolivia
- Human rights in Brazil
- Human rights in Chile
- Human rights in Colombia
- Human rights in Ecuador
- Human rights in Guyana
- Human rights in Panama
- Human rights in Paraguay
- Human rights in Peru
- Human rights in Suriname
- Human rights in Trinidad and Tobago
- Human rights in Uruguay
- Human rights in Venezuela

===== Human rights in dependencies and other territories =====
- Human rights in Aruba
- Human rights in Bonaire
- Human rights in Curaçao
- Human rights in the Falkland Islands
- Human rights in French Guiana
- Human rights in South Georgia and the South Sandwich Islands

==== Law by political division ====
===== Law of countries =====
- Law of Argentina
- Law of Bolivia
- Law of Brazil
- Law of Chile
- Law of Colombia
- Law of Ecuador
- Law of Guyana
- Law of Panama
- Law of Paraguay
- Law of Peru
- Law of Suriname
- Law of Trinidad and Tobago
- Law of Uruguay
- Law of Venezuela

===== Law of dependencies and other territories =====
- Law of Aruba
- Law of Bonaire
- Law of Curaçao
- Law of the Falkland Islands
- Law of French Guiana
- Law of South Georgia and the South Sandwich Islands

==== Law enforcement by political division ====
===== Law enforcement in countries =====
- Law enforcement in Argentina
- Law enforcement in Bolivia
- Law enforcement in Brazil
- Law enforcement in Chile
- Law enforcement in Colombia
- Law enforcement in Ecuador
- Law enforcement in Guyana
- Law enforcement in Panama
- Law enforcement in Paraguay
- Law enforcement in Peru
- Law enforcement in Suriname
- Law enforcement in Trinidad and Tobago
- Law enforcement in Uruguay
- Law enforcement in Venezuela

===== Law enforcement in dependencies and other territories =====
- Law enforcement in Aruba
- Law enforcement in Bonaire
- Law enforcement in Curaçao
- Law enforcement in the Falkland Islands
- Law enforcement in French Guiana
- Law enforcement in South Georgia and the South Sandwich Islands

=== Governments of South America ===
- South American Union

== History of South America ==
=== History of South America, by period ===
- Pre-Columbian era
- Early modern period
  - European colonization of the Americas
    - Portuguese colonization of the Americas
      - Colonial Brazil
    - Spanish colonization of the Americas
      - Colonial Argentina
      - Colonial Bolivia
      - Colonial Chile
      - Colonial Peru
      - Colonial Venezuela

=== History of South America, by region ===
- History of Andean South America

==== History of South America, by country ====
- History of Argentina
- History of Bolivia
- History of Brazil
  - Empire of Brazil
- History of Chile
- History of Colombia
- History of Ecuador
- History of Guyana
- History of Panama
- History of Paraguay
- History of Peru
- History of Suriname
- History of Trinidad and Tobago
- History of Uruguay
- History of Venezuela

==== History of dependencies and other territories ====
- History of Aruba
- History of Bonaire
- History of Curaçao
- History of the Falkland Islands
- History of French Guiana
- History of South Georgia and the South Sandwich Islands

=== History of South America, by subject ===
- Military history of South America
  - Spanish American wars of independence
  - Latin American wars of independence
  - South American dreadnought race
- Slavery in South America
  - Slavery in Brazil

== Culture of South America ==
Culture of South America

- Coats of arms of South America
- Flags of South America
- Religion in South America
  - Islam in South America
  - Christianity in South America
  - Hinduism in South America
- World Heritage Sites

=== Culture in South America, by country ===
==== Culture of countries ====
- Culture of Argentina
- Culture of Bolivia
- Culture of Brazil
- Culture of Chile
- Culture of Colombia
- Culture of Ecuador
- Culture of Guyana
- Culture of Panama
- Culture of Paraguay
- Culture of Peru
- Culture of Suriname
- Culture of Trinidad and Tobago
- Culture of Uruguay
- Culture of Venezuela

==== Culture of dependencies and other territories ====
- Culture of Aruba
- Culture of Bonaire
- Culture of Curaçao
- Culture of the Falkland Islands
- Culture of French Guiana
- Culture of South Georgia and the South Sandwich Islands

=== Architecture of South America ===
- Architecture of Argentina
- Architecture of Colombia
- Architecture of Peru

=== Cuisine of South America ===
Cuisine of South America

- Cuisine of Argentina
- Cuisine of Bolivia
- Cuisine of Brazil
- Cuisine of Chile
- Cuisine of Colombia
- Cuisine of Ecuador
- Cuisine of Guyana
- Cuisine of Panama
- Cuisine of Paraguay
- Cuisine of Peru
- Cuisine of Suriname
- Cuisine of Trinidad and Tobago
- Cuisine of Uruguay
- Cuisine of Venezuela

=== Languages of South America ===
Languages of South America

==== Languages of South America, by country ====
- Languages of Argentina
- Languages of Bolivia
- Languages of Brazil
- Languages of Chile
- Languages of Colombia
- Languages of Ecuador
- Languages of Guyana
- Languages of Panama
- Languages of Paraguay
- Languages of Peru
- Languages of Suriname
- Languages of Trinidad and Tobago
- Languages of Uruguay
- Languages of Venezuela

==== Languages of dependencies and other territories ====
- Languages of Aruba
- Languages of Bonaire
- Languages of Curaçao
- Languages of the Falkland Islands
- Languages of French Guiana
- Languages of South Georgia and the South Sandwich Islands

=== Media of South America ===
- Media of Argentina
- Media of Bolivia
- Media of Colombia
- Media of Paraguay
- Media of Peru
- Media of Venezuela

=== Prostistution in South America ===
Prostitution in South America

- Prostitution in Argentina
- Prostitution in Bolivia
- Prostitution in Brazil
- Prostitution in Chile
- Prostitution in Colombia
- Prostitution in Ecuador
- Prostitution in Guyana
- Prostitution in Paraguay
- Prostitution in Peru
- Prostitution in Suriname
- Prostitution in Trinidad and Tobago
- Prostitution in Uruguay
- Prostitution in Venezuela

=== Racism in South America ===
Racism in South America

- Racism in Argentina
- Racism in Brazil

=== Religion in South America ===
Religion in South America

- Religion in Argentina
- Religion in Bolivia
- Religion in Brazil
- Religion in Chile
- Religion in Colombia
- Religion in Ecuador
- Religion in Guyana
- Religion in Panama
- Religion in Paraguay
- Religion in Peru
- Religion in Suriname
- Religion in Trinidad and Tobago
- Religion in Uruguay
- Religion in Venezuela

=== Sport in South America ===
Sport in South America

==== Sport in South America, by country ====
- Sport in Argentina
- Sport in Bolivia
- Sport in Brazil
- Sport in Chile
- Sport in Colombia
- Sport in Ecuador
- Sport in Guyana
- Sport in Panama
- Sport in Paraguay
- Sport in Peru
- Sport in Suriname
- Sport in Trinidad and Tobago
- Sport in Uruguay
- Sport in Venezuela

==== Sport in dependencies and other territories ====
- Sport in Aruba
- Sport in Bonaire
- Sport in Curaçao
- Sport in the Falkland Islands
- Sport in French Guiana
- Sport in South Georgia and the South Sandwich Islands

== South America lists ==
- List of newspapers in South America
- List of radio stations in South America
- List of television stations in South America

== See also ==
- Outline of North America
- List of Caribbean-related topics
- List of Central America-related topics
- Lists of country-related topics
  - List of Bolivia-related topics
  - List of Chile-related topics
  - List of Falkland Islands-related topics
  - Index of French Guiana-related articles
