= Outline of Trinidad and Tobago =

Overview of and topical guide to Trinidad and Tobago

The Flag of Trinidad and Tobago

The Coat of arms of Trinidad and Tobago

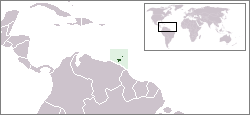
The location of Trinidad and Tobago

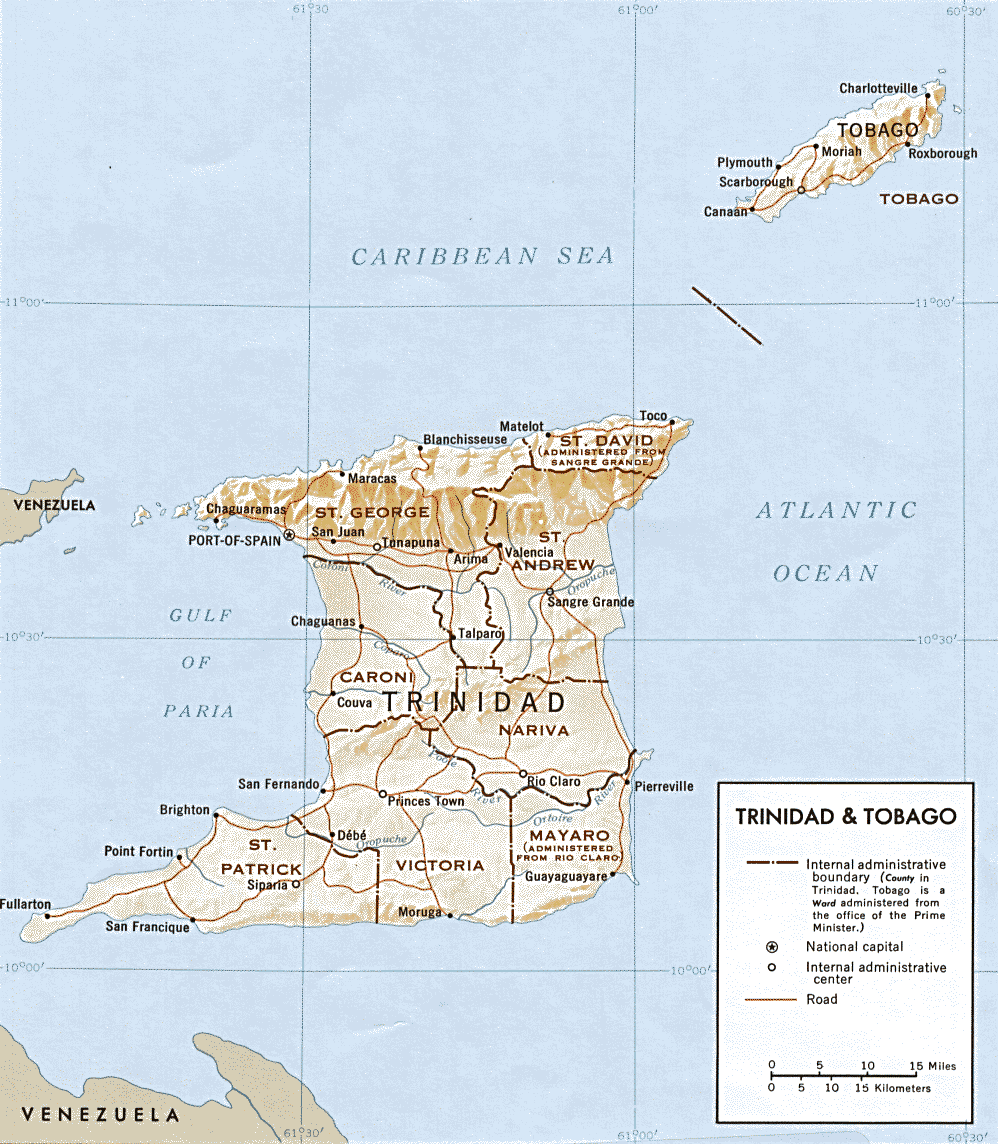
An enlargeable relief map of Trinidad and Tobago

The following outline is provided as an overview of and topical guide to Trinidad and Tobago:

Trinidad and Tobago – sovereign island nation located in the Lesser Antilles Archipelago in the southeastern Caribbean Sea. Trinidad and Tobago lies northeast of Venezuela and south of the island nation of Grenada. It also shares maritime boundaries with Barbados to the northeast and Guyana to the southeast. The country covers an area of 5,128 square kilometers (1,979 sq mi) and consists of two main islands, Trinidad and Tobago, and numerous smaller landforms. Trinidad is the larger and more populous of the main islands; Tobago is much smaller, comprising about 6% of the total area and 4% of the population.

Officially Trinidadians or Tobagonians, the people from Trinidad and Tobago are often informally referred to as Trinbagonians or Trinis (for Trinidadians). Unlike most of the English-speaking Caribbean, Trinidad and Tobago is a primarily industrialised country whose economy is based on petroleum and petrochemicals. Trinidad and Tobago is famous for its pre-Lenten Carnival and as the birthplace of steelpan, calypso, chutney, chutney-soca, pichakaree, chut-kai-pang, cariso, kaiso, parang, soca, and limbo.

== General reference ==
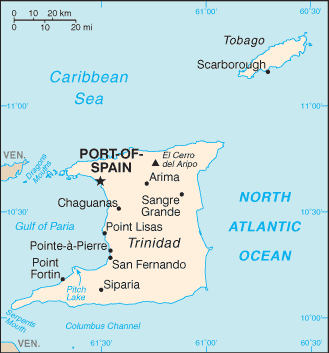
An enlargeable basic map of Trinidad and Tobago

- Abbreviations: RTT, RofTT, TRI, TT
- Pronunciation: tri-nee-dad an To-bay-go
- Common English country name: Trinidad and Tobago
- Official English country name: The Republic of Trinidad and Tobago
- Common endonym(s): Trinidad and Tobago
- Official endonym(s): The Republic of Trinidad and Tobago
- Adjectives: Trinidadian, Tobagonian, Trinbagonian
- Demonym(s): Trinidadians, Tobagonians, Trinbagonians (colloquial), Trinis (colloquial)
- Etymology: Name of Trinidad and Tobago
- International rankings of Trinidad and Tobago
- ISO country codes: TT, TTO, 780
- ISO region codes: See ISO 3166-2:TT
- Internet country code top-level domain: .tt

== Geography of Trinidad and Tobago ==
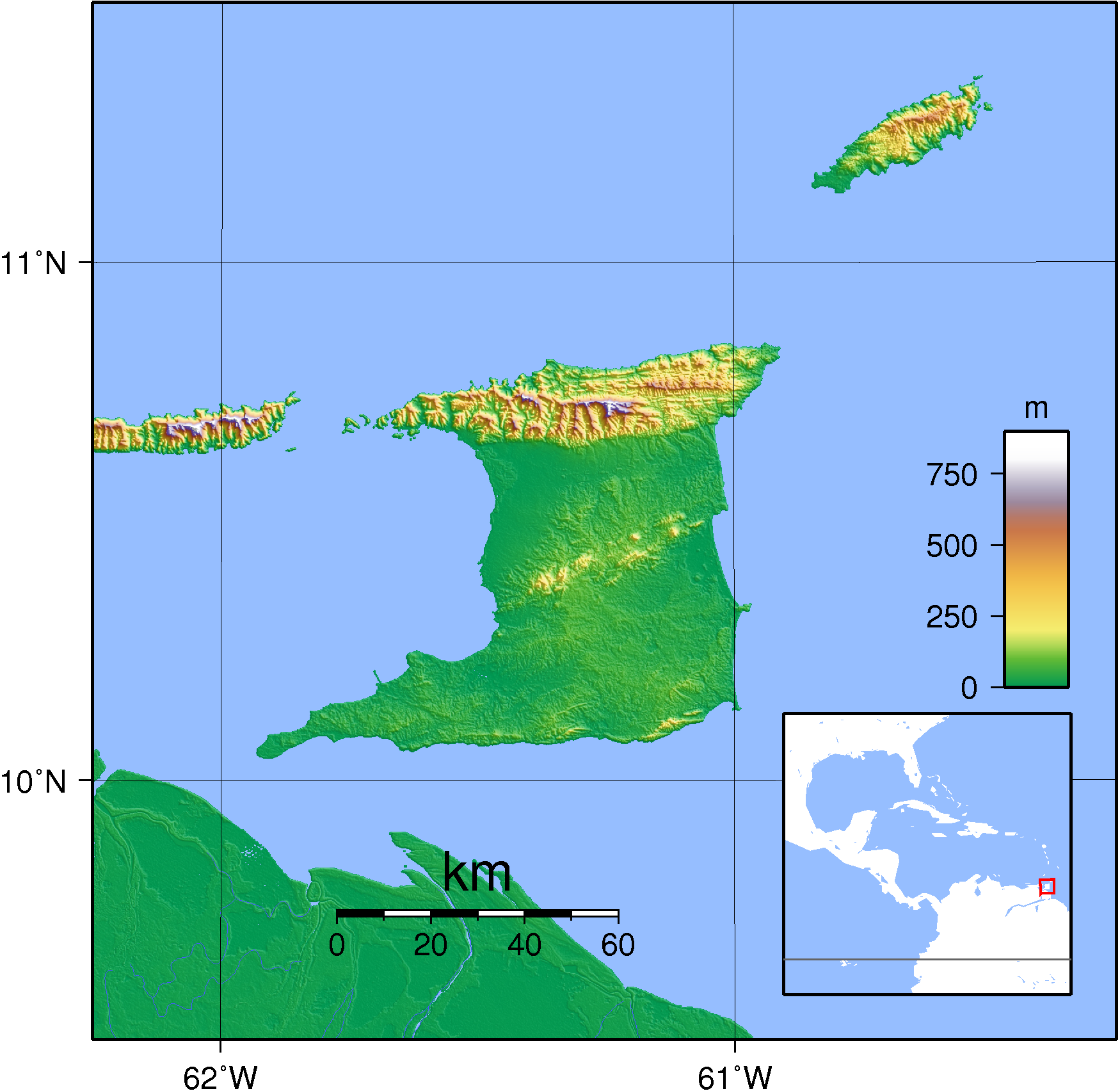
An enlargeable topographic map of Trinidad and Tobago

Geography of Trinidad and Tobago

- Trinidad and Tobago is: an island country
- Location:
  - Northern Hemisphere and Western Hemisphere
    - North America, Caribbean
  - Atlantic Ocean
    - North Atlantic
      - Caribbean
        - Antilles
          - Lesser Antilles (island chain)
  - Time zone: Eastern Caribbean Time (UTC-04)
  - Extreme points of Trinidad and Tobago
    - High: El Cerro del Aripo on Trinidad 940 m (3,084 ft)
    - Low: Caribbean Sea 0 m
  - Land boundaries: none
  - Coastline: 362 km
- Population of Trinidad and Tobago: 1,328,019 - 149th most populous country
- Area of Trinidad and Tobago: 5,128 km^{2}
- Atlas of Trinidad and Tobago

=== Environment of Trinidad and Tobago ===
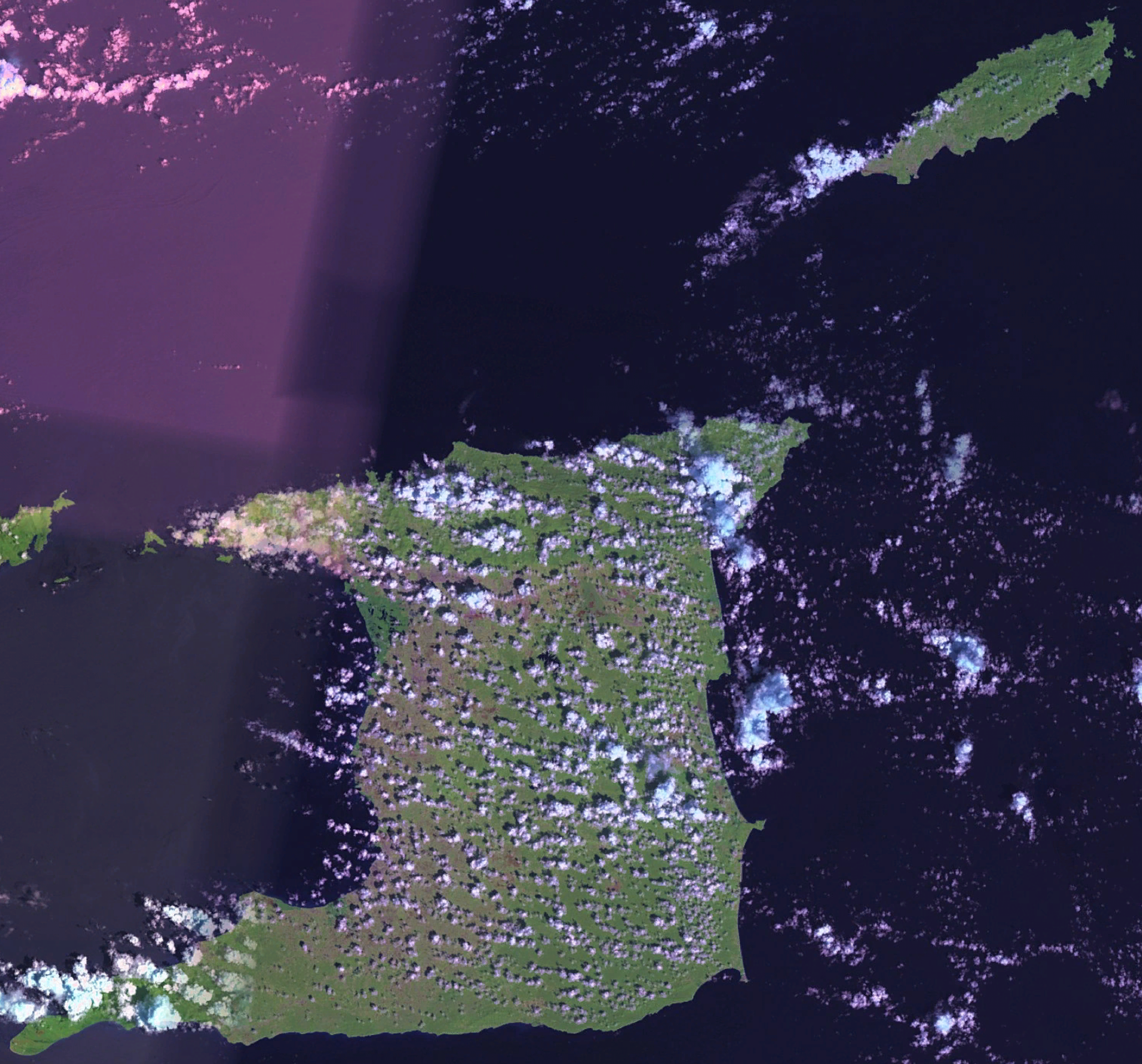
An enlargeable satellite image of Trinidad and Tobago

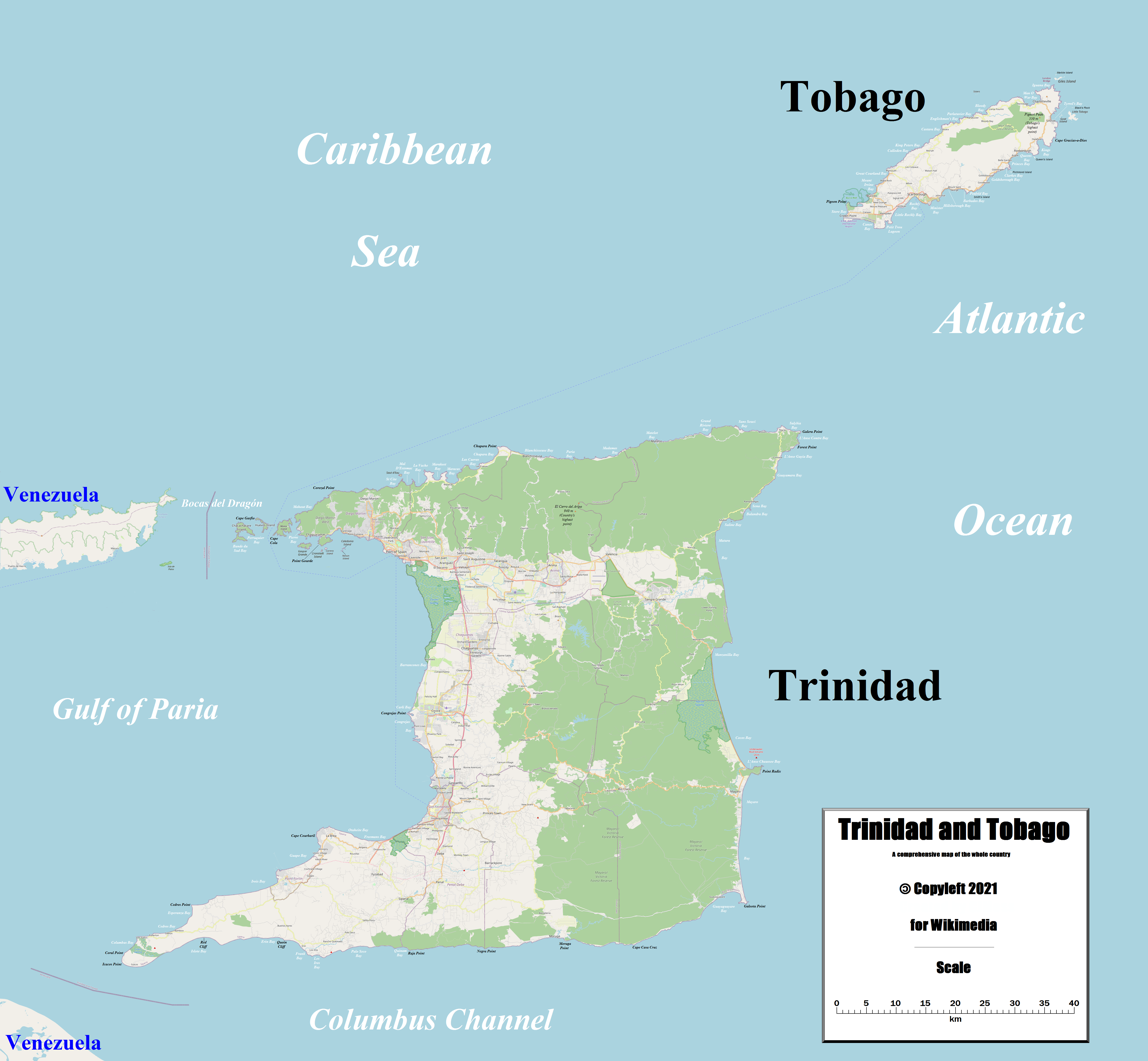
an enlargeable comprehensive map of the country

Environment of Trinidad and Tobago

- Climate of Trinidad and Tobago
- Renewable energy in Trinidad and Tobago
- Geology of Trinidad and Tobago
- Protected areas of Trinidad and Tobago
  - National parks of Trinidad and Tobago
- Wildlife of Trinidad and Tobago
    - Endemic flora of Trinidad and Tobago
  - Fauna of Trinidad and Tobago
    - Birds of Trinidad and Tobago
    - Mammals of Trinidad and Tobago
    - Snakes of Trinidad and Tobago
    - Butterflies of Tobago

==== Natural geographic features of Trinidad and Tobago ====
- Islands of Trinidad and Tobago
- Lakes of Trinidad and Tobago
- Mountains of Trinidad and Tobago
  - Volcanoes in Trinidad and Tobago
- Rivers of Trinidad and Tobago
  - Waterfalls of Trinidad and Tobago
- Valleys of Trinidad and Tobago
- World Heritage Sites in Trinidad and Tobago: None

=== Regions of Trinidad and Tobago ===
==== Ecoregions of Trinidad and Tobago ====
List of ecoregions in Trinidad and Tobago

- Ecoregions in Trinidad and Tobago
- Regions and municipalities of Trinidad and Tobago

=== Demography of Trinidad and Tobago ===
Demographics of Trinidad and Tobago

== Government and politics of Trinidad and Tobago ==
Local government divisions in Trinidad and Tobago

Politics of Trinidad and Tobago

- Form of government:
- Capital of Trinidad and Tobago: Port of Spain
- Elections in Trinidad and Tobago
- Political parties in Trinidad and Tobago

=== Branches of the government of Trinidad and Tobago ===
Government of Trinidad and Tobago

==== Executive branch of the government of Trinidad and Tobago ====
- Head of state: President of Trinidad and Tobago, Christine Kangaloo
- Head of government: Prime Minister of Trinidad and Tobago, Kamla Persad-Bissessar
- Cabinet of Trinidad and Tobago

==== Legislative branch of the government of Trinidad and Tobago ====
- Parliament of Trinidad and Tobago (bicameral)
  - Upper house: Senate of Trinidad and Tobago
  - Lower house: House of Representatives of Trinidad and Tobago

==== Judicial branch of the government of Trinidad and Tobago ====
Court system of Trinidad and Tobago

- Supreme Court of Trinidad and Tobago

=== Foreign relations of Trinidad and Tobago ===
Foreign relations of Trinidad and Tobago

- List of diplomatic missions of Trinidad and Tobago

==== International organization membership ====
The Republic of Trinidad and Tobago is a member of:

- African, Caribbean, and Pacific Group of States (ACP)
- Agency for the Prohibition of Nuclear Weapons in Latin America and the Caribbean (OPANAL)
- Caribbean Community and Common Market (Caricom)
- Caribbean Development Bank (CDB)
- Commonwealth of Nations
- Food and Agriculture Organization (FAO)
- Group of 24 (G24)
- Group of 77 (G77)
- Inter-American Development Bank (IADB)
- International Bank for Reconstruction and Development (IBRD)
- International Civil Aviation Organization (ICAO)
- International Criminal Court (ICCt)
- International Criminal Police Organization (Interpol)
- International Development Association (IDA)
- International Federation of Red Cross and Red Crescent Societies (IFRCS)
- International Finance Corporation (IFC)
- International Fund for Agricultural Development (IFAD)
- International Hydrographic Organization (IHO)
- International Labour Organization (ILO)
- International Maritime Organization (IMO)
- International Monetary Fund (IMF)
- International Olympic Committee (IOC)
- International Organization for Standardization (ISO)
- International Red Cross and Red Crescent Movement (ICRM)
- International Telecommunication Union (ITU)
- International Telecommunications Satellite Organization (ITSO)
- International Trade Union Confederation (ITUC)
- Latin American Economic System (LAES)
- Multilateral Investment Guarantee Agency (MIGA)
- Nonaligned Movement (NAM)
- Organisation for the Prohibition of Chemical Weapons (OPCW)
- Organization of American States (OAS)
- United Nations (UN)
- United Nations Conference on Trade and Development (UNCTAD)
- United Nations Educational, Scientific, and Cultural Organization (UNESCO)
- United Nations Industrial Development Organization (UNIDO)
- Universal Postal Union (UPU)
- World Confederation of Labour (WCL)
- World Customs Organization (WCO)
- World Federation of Trade Unions (WFTU)
- World Health Organization (WHO)
- World Intellectual Property Organization (WIPO)
- World Meteorological Organization (WMO)
- World Trade Organization (WTO)

=== Law and order in Trinidad and Tobago ===
Law of Trinidad and Tobago

- Constitution of Trinidad and Tobago
  - Savings clause
  - Modification clause
- Crime in Trinidad and Tobago
- Human rights in Trinidad and Tobago
  - LGBT rights in Trinidad and Tobago
  - Freedom of religion in Trinidad and Tobago
- Law enforcement in Trinidad and Tobago

=== Military of Trinidad and Tobago ===
Military of Trinidad and Tobago

- Command
  - Commander-in-chief: President
    - Ministry of National Security of Trinidad and Tobago
- Forces
  - Army of Trinidad and Tobago
  - Coast Guard of Trinidad and Tobago
  - Air Force of Trinidad and Tobago

=== Local government in Trinidad and Tobago ===
Local government in Trinidad and Tobago

== History of Trinidad and Tobago ==
History of Trinidad and Tobago

== Culture of Trinidad and Tobago ==
Culture of Trinidad and Tobago

- Cuisine of Trinidad and Tobago
- Trinidad and Tobago Carnival
- National symbols of Trinidad and Tobago
  - Coat of arms of Trinidad and Tobago
  - Flag of Trinidad and Tobago
  - National anthem of Trinidad and Tobago
- Languages of Trinidad and Tobago
- Prostitution in Trinidad and Tobago
- Public holidays in Trinidad and Tobago
- Religion in Trinidad and Tobago
  - Christianity in Trinidad and Tobago
    - Roman Catholicism in Trinidad and Tobago
    - Anglican Diocese of Trinidad and Tobago
  - Hinduism in Trinidad and Tobago
  - Islam in Trinidad and Tobago

=== Art in Trinidad and Tobago ===
- Literature of Trinidad and Tobago
- Music of Trinidad and Tobago
- Television in Trinidad and Tobago

=== Sports in Trinidad and Tobago ===
Sports in Trinidad and Tobago

- Football in Trinidad and Tobago
- Trinidad and Tobago at the Olympics

== Economy and infrastructure of Trinidad and Tobago ==
Economy of Trinidad and Tobago

- Economic rank, by nominal GDP (2007): 91st (ninety-first)
- Banking in Trinidad and Tobago
  - Central Bank of Trinidad and Tobago
- Communications in Trinidad and Tobago
  - Internet in Trinidad and Tobago
- Companies of Trinidad and Tobago
- Currency of Trinidad and Tobago: Dollar
  - ISO 4217: TTD
- Transport in Trinidad and Tobago
- Trinidad and Tobago Stock Exchange

== Education in Trinidad and Tobago ==
Education in Trinidad and Tobago

- List of schools in Trinidad and Tobago
- List of colleges and universities in Trinidad and Tobago
- List of Trinidad and Tobago special schools

== Infrastructure of Trinidad and Tobago ==
- Health care in Trinidad and Tobago
- Transportation in Trinidad and Tobago
  - Airports in Trinidad and Tobago
  - Rail transport in Trinidad and Tobago
- Water supply and sanitation in Trinidad and Tobago

== See also ==
- Index of Trinidad and Tobago-related articles
- List of international rankings
- List of Trinidad and Tobago-related topics
- Member states of the Commonwealth of Nations
- Member state of the United Nations
- Outline of geography
- Outline of North America
- Outline of South America
