= Sexual Offences Act (Trinidad and Tobago) =

Act of the Parliament of Trinidad and Tobago relating to sexual offences

The Sexual Offences Act is an Act of the Parliament of Trinidad and Tobago relating to sexual offences.

In April 2018, the Trinidad and Tobago High Court declared the country's buggery law unconstitutional, as it infringed on the rights of LGBTQ citizens and criminalised consensual sexual acts between adults. However, in March 2025, the Court of Appeal overturned this decision, making "buggery" and "gross indecency" once again illegal in Trinidad and Tobago.

In November 2026, the section of the act criminalizing homosexuality was overturned by Trinidad and Tobago's highest court, the Privy Council Judicial Committee, based in the Middlesex Guildhall in London, which also hosts the Supreme Court of the United Kingdom.

== See also ==
- LGBTQ rights in Trinidad and Tobago
