= LGBTQ rights in Trinidad and Tobago =

Rights of lesbian, gay, bisexual, transgender and queer people in Trinidad & Tobago

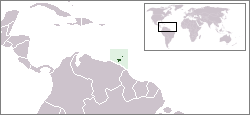
- Trinidad and Tobago
- Legal status: Legal (Judicial Committee of the Privy Council overturned the 2025 ruling on November 10 2026)
- Gender identity: No
- Military: No
- Discrimination protections: No

Family rights
- Recognition of relationships: No
- Adoption: No

Lesbian, gay, bisexual, transgender and queer (LGBTQ) people in Trinidad and Tobago face legal challenges not experienced by non-LGBTQ residents. Although same-sex sexual activity has been legalised as of November 10, 2026, households headed by same-sex couples are not eligible for the same rights and benefits as that of opposite-sex couples.

In April 2018, the Trinidad and Tobago High Court declared the country's buggery law unconstitutional, as it infringed on the rights of LGBTQ citizens and criminalised consensual sexual acts between adults. However, in March 2025, the Court of Appeal overturned this decision, making buggery and gross indecency once again illegal in Trinidad and Tobago.

However, in 2026 the Privy Council Judicial Committee, based in the Supreme Court buildings in London, which is Trinidad and Tobago's highest court of appeal, overturned the 2025 Court of Appeal decision.

== Legality of same-sex sexual activity ==
Recognition of same-sex unions in the Lesser Antilles and Puerto Rico Same-sex marriage Unregistered cohabitation Island subject to IACHR advisory opinion No recognition of same-sex couples Constitutional ban on same-sex marriage Same-sex sexual activity illegal but penalties not enforced

Same-sex sexual activity is legal.

Prior to 2018, when these provisions were struck down by a court, Section 13 of the Sexual Offences Act 1986 (strengthened in 2000) criminalised "buggery", with 25 years imprisonment. The law punished oral and anal sex between heterosexuals as well.

In March 2025, the Court of Appeal overturned the ruling that decriminalized buggery, but replaced its penalty with a maximum 5-year sentence. In the same judgement, the court reinstated section 61 of the Offences Against the Person Act 1925, maintaining legal prohibitions against acts of gross indecency with a penalty of up to two years of imprisonment.

In November 2026, the Judicial Committee of the Privy Council, which acts as the 'supreme' court for Trinidad and Tobago, overturned the 2025 ruling. This means that same-sex sexual activity is now fully legalised.

=== Enforcement ===
The Trinidad and Tobago Government had not targeted homosexuals under the "buggery" or "serious indecency" laws; however, in limited historical cases, individuals had been charged and convicted of these offences when coupled with other serious crimes.

=== Decriminalisation efforts ===
On 21 February 2017, Trinidad-born LGBTQ activist Jason Jones filed a case before the High Court of Trinidad and Tobago seeking to have both Section 13 and Section 16 declared null and void. A hearing on the case took place on 30 January 2018. Prior to the judgment being delivered, evangelical groups urged the High Court to keep the buggery law intact, calling same-sex marriage "a cancer" and claiming that "God would visit his wrath upon Trinidad and Tobago and it would lead to more natural disasters and destruction." They argued that if LGBTQ people were not criminals anymore, then this would violate their religious beliefs.

The judgement was delivered by Justice Devindra Rampersad on 12 April 2018. Rampersad "repealed sections 13 and 16 of the Sexual Offenses Act" and ruled that the law violated the human rights to privacy and expression. He declared these two sections "unconstitutional, illegal, null, void, invalid and of no effect" and compared prejudices against gays to those against Blacks during apartheid and those against Jews during the Holocaust. LGBTQ activists outside the courthouse cheered when the decision was announced. Later in the day, some LGBTQ supporters were physically attacked and beaten by anti-gay protesters.

A final judgment on how to deal with the now unconstitutional sections 13 and 16 was scheduled for July, but was later moved to 20 September. At which time, it would be decided if they ought to be modified to remove parts pertaining to consenting adults or if they should be struck down in their entirety. Costs would also be decided. On 20 September, Rampersad modified the two sections and introduced the concept of consent. Section 12 now reads: In this section "buggery" means sexual intercourse without consent per anum by a male person with a male person or by a male person with a female person, and Section 16 reads: A person who commits an act of serious indecency on or towards another is liable on conviction to imprisonment for five years... does not apply to an act of serious indecency committed in private between (a) a husband and his wife; (b) persons, each of whom is sixteen years of age or more, both of whom consent to the commission of the act... Rampersad also refused to give the state a 45-day stay to appeal.

On March 26, 2025, the Court of Appeal overturned the ruling, finding that the prohibitions on buggery and gross indecency were protected by the constitution's "savings clause," which insulates pre-independence laws from constitutional challenge. Jones immediately announced his intention to appeal the decision to the Privy Council in London, Trinidad and Tobago's top court. They scheduled the appeal to be held on July 8, 2026.

On November 10 2026, the Judicial Committee of the Privy Council overturned the March 2025 ruling made by the Court of Appeal. This means that same-sex sexual activity is now legal.

== Recognition of same-sex relationships ==
Trinidad and Tobago does not recognize same-sex marriage or civil unions.

In July 2018, Justice Frank Seepersad of the San Fernando High Court approved an order to resolve a property dispute between two gay partners who had both a personal and a business relationship. Citing that equality before the law in property and inheritance matters should not vary between homosexual and heterosexual partners, Seepersad noted the unequal treatment under current law. The parties in the litigation before the court drafted a consensual arrangement to settle their property dispute. Had they not reached an agreement, Seepersad warned that the "court would have had to rely on the law of trusts and adopt innovative or radical applications to ensure that the common law was developed to determine what happens to property after the dissolution of a same-sex union".

== Adoption and parenting ==
Same-sex couples are unable to legally adopt in Trinidad and Tobago.

While not explicitly prohibited or regulated by law, the Barbados Fertility Centre, which has a clinic in Saint Augustine, offers IVF and artificial insemination treatments to lesbian couples and gestational surrogacy arrangements to gay male couples.

== Immigration ban ==
Under Section 8 of the Immigration Act, homosexual men and women who are not citizens are not allowed to enter Trinidad and Tobago. However, this law is not known to have been enforced.

(1) Except as provided in subsection (2), entry into Trinidad and Tobago of the persons described in this subsection, other than citizens and, subject to section 7(2), residents, is prohibited, namely-

* * * *
(e) ... homosexuals or persons living on the earnings of ... homosexuals, or persons reasonably suspected as coming to Trinidad and Tobago for these or any other immoral purposes....

=== Enforcement ===
The law forbidding immigration is not known to have been enforced.

In 2007, a highly vocal campaign opposed British musician Elton John's entry into the country. This was led by the local Anglican Church, in particular Archdeacon Philip Isaac. The Parliament of Trinidad and Tobago rejected the call to bar Elton John from entry, and the concert went ahead as planned in May 2007.

=== Repeal efforts ===
A challenge by Jamaican activist Maurice Tomlinson was filed in 2013 to the immigration ban in both Trinidad and Tobago and Belize. Tomlinson asked Jamaica, his home country, to insist that the travel bans of these countries be removed based on CARICOM provisions for free movement of citizens of member countries. Jamaica refused, and Tomlinson petitioned the Caribbean Court of Justice asking leave to file the case with them directly. In May 2014, Tomlinson was granted leave to challenge the immigration laws of both countries. In October 2014, CARICOM joined the case as an interested party supporting Tomlinson's arguments. On 18 March 2015, the challenge was heard with allegations that the immigration bans abridge the rights of free movement for Caribbean citizens contained in the Treaty of Chaguaramas. On 10 June 2016, the CCJ ruled that neither Trinidad and Tobago nor Belize had violated Tomlinson's freedom of movement, dismissing his case. As clarification, the judgment noted that neither state can ban homosexuals from CARICOM countries from entering their countries due to their treaty obligations, "notwithstanding their laws that ban the entry of gays".

== Public opinion ==
A poll conducted by the Vanderbilt University in 2010 found that 15.4% of the Trinbagonian population supported same-sex marriage.

A UNAIDS survey conducted in 2013 found that 38% of people in Trinidad and Tobago believed that discrimination based on sexual orientation is unacceptable, while 16% considered themselves either accepting or tolerant of homosexuals.

== Public political statements on LGBTQ rights ==
In December 2012, Prime Minister Kamla Persad-Bissessar responded to a letter protesting the country's anti-gay laws by stating,

With respect to the concerns raised in your letter regarding aspects of T&T's Sexual Offences Act and the Immigration Act which may target persons who identify as lesbian, gay, bisexual or transgender (LGBT), I wish to assure you that due consideration is being given to these issues by my Government. I do not support discrimination in any form against any individual, regardless of their gender identity or sexual orientation. I share your view that the stigmatisation of homosexuality in T&T is a matter which must be addressed on the grounds of human rights and dignity to which every individual is entitled under international law. As such I am pleased to inform you that I have mandated my Minister of Gender, Youth and Child Development, Senator the Honourable Marlene Coudray to prepare and present a national gender policy to Cabinet over the coming months. It is expected that once adopted, this policy will forge the way forward for T&T as my Government seeks to put an end to all discrimination based on gender or sexual orientation.

In June 2016, Prime Minister Dr Keith Rowley responded on the question of protection for LGBTQ citizens:

I want to make it abundantly clear that every citizen of Trinidad and Tobago, regardless of who he or she may be, will have the protection of the written Constitution. All State agencies have a duty to protect every citizen of Trinidad and Tobago regardless of whom they sleep with.

== Social conditions ==
Trinidad and Tobago is considered a "relatively safe" destination for gay travellers.

=== Activism ===
There are a few LGBTQ organisations in Trinidad and Tobago. The Coalition Advocating for Inclusion of Sexual Orientation (CAISO) was founded in 2009 due to a study carried out earlier in 2009 by the University of the West Indies for the Ministry of Social Developments which concluded that four of every five Trinbagonians believed in denying someone rights or equality based on one's sexual orientation. CAISO seeks to encourage public discussion on sexuality issues and include sexual orientation in legislative protections from discrimination.

Other LGBTQ groups include I Am ONE Trinidad and Tobago, which seeks to address the needs of gender and sexual minorities by building community and providing safe spaces, education and expressive platforms for empowerment, the Silver Lining Foundation, which seeks to end bullying against LGBTQ youth and the Trinidad & Tobago's FreePride Foundation Project, which advocates for equality, human rights and well-being towards the marginalized non-heterosexual community. Trinidad and Tobago Transgender Coalition advocates on behalf of transgender people.

Trinidad and Tobago organised its first pride parade on 27 July 2018 at the Nelson Mandela Park in Port of Spain. Expressing his opinion on the march, Roman Catholic Archbishop Rev. Jason Gordon said: "TT is a democracy and as such members of society have a right to protest whenever they believe their rights are not being upheld or violated. (The) LGBT+ community has several areas where there is legitimate concern and these have to be taken seriously by the country and by the government and people of TT."

== Summary table ==
Same-sex sexual activity legal	Yes (in 2018–2025 and again since 2026)
Equal age of consent (18)	Yes
Anti-discrimination laws in employment	No
Anti-discrimination laws in the provision of goods and services	No
Anti-discrimination laws in all other areas (incl. indirect discrimination, hate speech)	No
Same-sex marriages	No
Recognition of same-sex couples	No
Stepchild adoption by same-sex couples	No
Joint adoption by same-sex couples	No
LGBTQ people allowed to serve openly in the military	Yes
Right to change legal gender	No
Access to IVF for lesbians	Yes
Commercial surrogacy for gay male couples	Yes / No (Some clinics offer altruistic gestational surrogacy arrangements to gay couples)
MSMs allowed to donate blood	Yes (According to the Ministry of Health's website, prospective donors who have had male-to-male sexual intercourse are deferred for three (3) months after their last intimate encounter)

== See also ==
- Human rights in Trinidad and Tobago
- LGBTQ rights in the Americas
