= Dominican Republic–Uruguay relations =

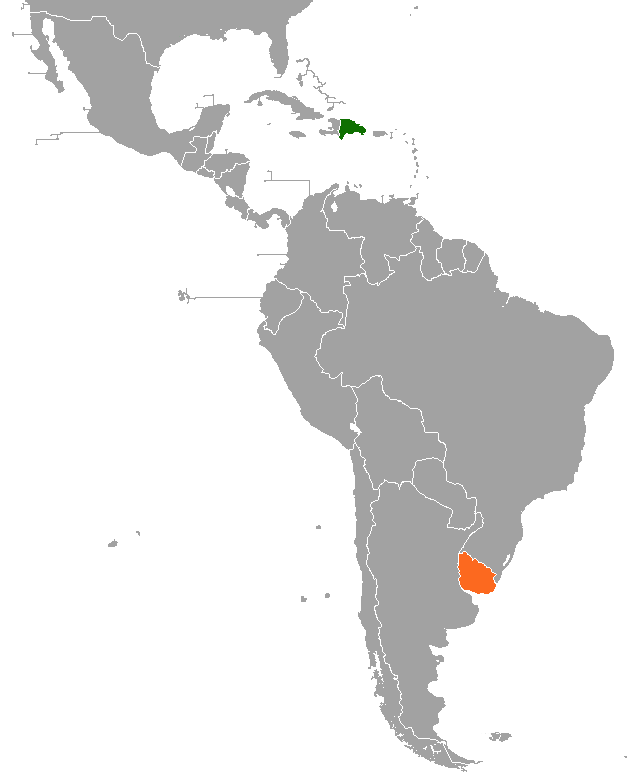
- Dominican Republic: Uruguay

Dominican Republic–Uruguay relations refers to the diplomatic relations between the Dominican Republic and the Oriental Republic of Uruguay. Both nations are members of the Community of Latin American and Caribbean States, Group of 77, Organization of American States, Organization of Ibero-American States and the United Nations.

== History ==
Both the Dominican Republic and Uruguay share a common history in the fact that both nations were once part of the Spanish Empire. During the Spanish colonial period, the Dominican Republic was governed under the Captaincy General of Santo Domingo and in 1521, it came under the greater Viceroyalty of New Spain based in Mexico City. Uruguay was governed by the Viceroyalty of the Río de la Plata and administered from Buenos Aires. Diplomatic relations between the Dominican Republic and Uruguay were established on 5 September 1945.

Both nations partake in various multilateral Latin American summits and have had several high-level bilateral meetings. In August 2001 Dominican President Hipólito Mejía paid an official visit to Uruguay and met with Uruguayan President Jorge Batlle. In November 2002, Uruguayan President Jorge Batlle paid a visit to the Dominican Republic. In August 2004, President Batlle returned to the Dominican Republic to attend the inauguration of Dominican President Leonel Fernández.

== Agreements ==
Both nations have signed several bilateral agreements such as an Agreement for Cultural Cooperation (1988); Agreement for Scientific and Technical Cooperation (2001); Agreement for the Exemption of Visa Requirement for Diplomatic and Official Passport holders (2001); Agreement for Tourism Cooperation (2001); Memorandum of Understanding of Cooperation on Migratory Flows (2018); and a Memorandum of Understanding for the Establishment of a Joint Working Group for the Promotion of Trade, Investment and Productive Chain (2018).

== Resident diplomatic missions ==
- Dominican Republic has an embassy in Montevideo.
- Uruguay has an embassy in Santo Domingo.

== See also ==
- Dominicans in Uruguay
