= Dominican Argentines =

Dominican Argentine
Domínico-argentinos (Spanish)
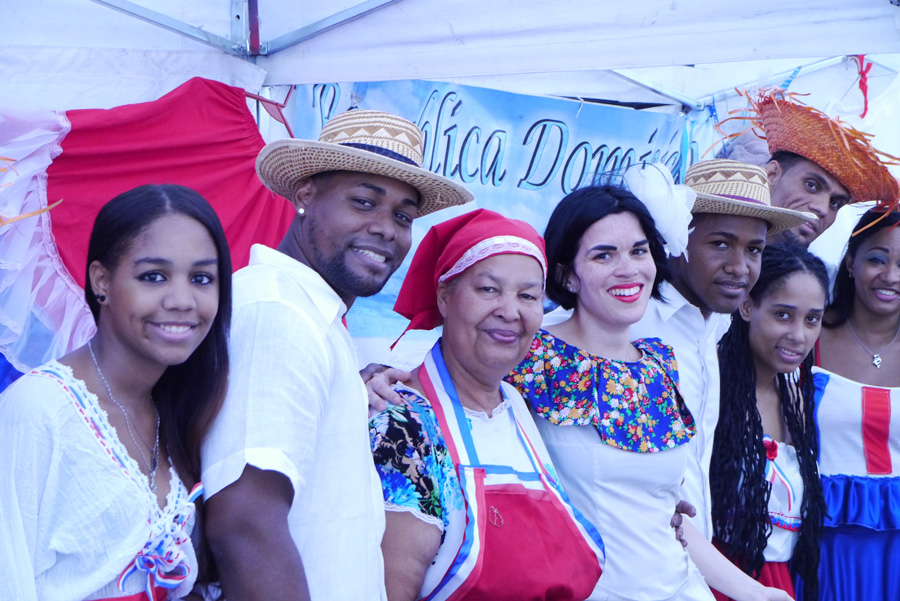
- Members of the Dominican community in Buenos Aires, 2016

Total population
- 50,000 (by birth, 2023); 70,000 (by ancestry, 2013)

Regions with significant populations
- Greater Buenos Aires

Languages
- Spanish

Religion
- Roman Catholicism

Related ethnic groups
- Dominicans; Dominican Americans; Dominican Uruguayans

Dominican Argentines (Spanish: dominicano-argentinos) are Argentine citizens of partial or full Dominican descent, or Dominican citizens who have migrated to and settled in Argentina. Although sources vary, as of 2013 were are an estimate 70,000 Dominican-Argentines, according to community organization Asociación de Dominicanos Residentes en Argentina.

== Characteristics ==
Buenos Aires Province concentrates 30 percent of the Dominican emigrants. The rest are spread across the remaining national territory.

Argentina began to emerge as a destination for Dominican migrants around 1990, during the country's currency convertibility period. This made Argentina attractive to migrants seeking to send dollar-denominated remittances to relatives while living in a Spanish-speaking country. Some of the first arrivals took place through recruitment networks that promised employment in domestic service, hotels, restaurants or the care of children and older adults. Recruiters sometimes arranged travel, accommodation and supposed employment in exchange for debts secured through loans or mortgages on family homes. After arriving in Argentina, some women found that the promised employment did not exist and were directed into prostitution or subjected to sexual exploitation. Studies of the migration distinguish between trafficking involving deception, threats or direct coercion and commercial sex undertaken without direct coercion.

Dominican nationals were not covered by the nationality-based residence provisions available to citizens of Mercosur member and associated states. Consequently, many migrants faced difficulties meeting the requirements for temporary residence and used alternatives such as work or student permits, family reunification, applications for refugee status and marriage to Argentine citizens. Argentina introduced a tourist visa requirement for Dominican citizens in 2012. A special regularization program implemented in 2013 received approximately 2,200 applications from Dominican nationals and granted temporary residence to around 2,000 people.

Studies conducted in Buenos Aires found that the Afro-Caribbean appearance of many Dominican migrants made the otherwise relatively small community highly visible. Interviewees reported discrimination, which researchers described as symbolic barriers affecting access to employment, public institutions and other rights. Dominican women have also been subjected to stereotypes associating them collectively with prostitution. Similar patterns were documented in Comodoro Rivadavia and Caleta Olivia, where discrimination intersected with nationality, skin colour, gender, social class and occupation.

== Community organization ==
Family, friendship and national networks have played an important role in Dominican migration. Established migrants frequently provided new arrivals with accommodation, information and introductions to employers. These networks also supported family reunification and connected migrants in Argentina with relatives and communities in the Dominican Republic. Community activities have included Dominican cultural parties, food events, fundraising campaigns and radio programs. Some migrants also established small businesses or promoted Dominican music and dance, including bachata, in their places of residence.

In Caleta Olivia, Dominican residents founded the Asociación de Residentes Dominicanos de Caleta Olivia in 2011. The organization obtained legal recognition and acted as a mutual-aid network, raising money through parties and other events when community members experienced illness, death or economic emergencies. It also participated in local civic activities, including the official parade marking the anniversary of Caleta Olivia.

Dominican migrants have also received assistance from religious institutions and migrant-rights organizations. In Buenos Aires, organizations such as CAREF, the Argentine Women’s Association for Human Rights, the Methodist Church, the Santa Micaela project and the Center for Legal and Social Studies provided legal advice, social assistance or support with immigration procedures.

== Notable Dominican Argentines ==
- Pedro Henríquez Ureña (1884–1946), philosopher, nationalized Argentine
- Jean Carlos (born 1971), dancer, singer and composer, nationalized Argentine
- Xavier Carreras (born 1994), basketball player, nationalized Argentine

== See also ==
- Immigration to Argentina
- Colombian Argentines
- Bolivian Argentines
- Venezuelan Argentines
