= Dominicans in Uruguay =

Dominican Uruguayan
Domínico-uruguayos (Spanish)

Total population
- 300 - 5000

Languages
- Spanish

Religion
- Roman Catholicism; Protestantism

Related ethnic groups
- Dominicans; Dominican Americans; Dominican Argentines

Dominican Uruguayans are people born in the Dominican Republic who live in Uruguay, or Uruguayan-born people of Dominican descent.

== Overview ==
There are some Dominican-born persons living in Uruguay, for a number of reasons. Both countries share the Spanish language; their historical origins are common (part of the Spanish Empire). Uruguay is a very small country, where Dominican people have looked for a new opportunity, as part of a big inflow of Latin Americans coming to Uruguay.

The 2011 Uruguayan census revealed just 50 people declaring the Dominican Republic as their country of birth. Other sources reveal that not less than 2,500 Dominicans have come to Uruguay in search for a better life. As of 2013, there are just 9 Dominicans registered in the Uruguayan social security; at the same time, there is a worrying presence of Dominican prostitutes in Uruguay. Other official sources show that over 2,000 Dominicans obtained Uruguayan identification documents in 2016.

== See also ==
- Dominican Republic–Uruguay relations
- Immigration to Uruguay
