= Rugby union in the Falkland Islands =

Rugby union in the Falkland Islands is a moderately popular sport.

== Governing body ==
Rugby union is played in the Falkland Islands under the auspices of the (English) Rugby Football Union.

== Dragon Cup ==
In June & July 2019, the Mount Pleasant Camp RFC took on the Falkland Islands RFC in a best-of-three series for the inaugural Dragon Cup, which the MPC team won. The two teams compete regularly.

== History ==
Rugby was first introduced to the Falkland Islands in the 19th Century, and is always of the union variety. Due to the low population of the islands (under 4,000), the islands do not have a proper league system, and games are played on an informal basis. Many teams are from the British military, and occasionally games would be played against visiting ships in past times.

In 1939, a group called the "Tabaris Highlanders" arrived on the islands for a brief two months. They were from the Anglo-Argentine community, and were supposed to defend the islands from a German attack during World War II, and were enrolled into the FIDF. Many of this group were rugby players, including Cpl Thomas Dawson Sanderson, who was president of a rugby club.

Falkland Islands rugby is relatively isolated geographically and is not integrated into South America, or the Confederación Sudamericana de Rugby, which is the continental rugby body. Rugby union is popular in Argentina, but political and historical reasons have prevented any contact in recent times.

== Broadcasting ==
The Falklands are able to receive some coverage of rugby including the Six Nations Championship.

== See also ==
- Sport in the Falkland Islands
- Falkland Islands national football team
- Falkland Islands cricket team
- Falkland Islands at the Commonwealth Games
