= Sport in the Falkland Islands =

Sport in the Falkland Islands is restricted by the islands' low, and generally scattered, population. Nonetheless, it has been able to send teams to the Commonwealth Games, and the Island Games.

The islands have produced one sportsman of note, Louis Baillon, who played on the England team that won the gold medal in field hockey at the 1908 Summer Olympics.

Race meetings are held from time to time during summer as horse riding is still a popular pastime.

A wide variety of sports are played in the Falkland Islands including: rugby union, Archery, Bowls, Badminton, Clay pigeon, darts, karate, marathon, golf, inline hockey, netball, yachting, squash, tennis, table tennis, volleyball, kayaking, target shooting and the country's National Sport, Sheep shearing in which they have internal and external competitions, competing World Wide.

Because of the large British military presence, some games involve their players and teams. There is an annual MPC (MILITARY) vs Stanley (CIVILIAN) games.

The Falklands Islands Rifle Association dates back to the 1880s.

The Falkland Islands national cricket team is a member of the International Cricket Council, and is the smallest member by population.

In 2019 the National Sports Council was formed to bring together the diverse sporting organisations under one group. The NSC organises the annual Falkland Games in November. The Falkland Games happens over two weekends. Entrants aged 15 and over are assigned into one of three teams, and teams compete in a variety of sports such as athletics, touch rugby, golf, volleyball, shooting and netball. A Junior Falkland Games happens the following month for under-15s.

Indoor Hockey is popular. Children play inline hockey in age-based leagues. Adults play inline hockey and dek hockey. Teams of children travel once a year to Punta Arenas in Chile to compete in a local ice hockey tournament. As the Falkland Islands does not have an ice rink, the teams arrive a few days before the start of the tournament to allow time for the younger ones to learn to ice skate.

A new sports centre is under construction. When open, it will have a climbing wall. The main hall will have interchangeable floors, with a synthetic ice surface for part of the year and a standard wooden surface the rest. A long hall is being built nearby, where archery and bowling can be practiced.

There is a women's netball league, a men's football league and a children's football league.

Running events in the Falklands are popular. There are three regular half marathons, the Cape Pembroke Half Marathon in late summer, the Stone Run Half Marathon in spring, and the West Falkland Half Marathon in winter. The Three Peaks Challenge follows a route approximately 20km from Moody Brook at the foot of Mount Tumbledown, up to the top of Tumbledown, over the saddle of Two Sisters, to the top of Mount Longdon, along Wireless Ridge and back to the start. It can be walked, run, or yomped in teams of four each with a 20kg backpack. The Standard Chartered Marathon, held in March, is the world's most southerly certified marathon. The Triathlon in autumn is 750m in the swimming pool, 20km cycling and 5km running. The Cape Pembroke Parkrun and the Mount Pleasant Parkrun are the only parkruns in South America.

== National football stadium ==
Stadium	Capacity	City
Stanley Stadium	1,000	Stanley

== See also ==
- Falkland Islands national football team
- Falkland Islands Football League
- Rugby union in the Falkland Islands
- Falkland Islands cricket team
- Falkland Islands at the Commonwealth Games

== External links and references ==
- Sport clubs in the Falkland Islands
- Cultural stuff – infrastructure, facilities and travel
- Falkland Islands Overseas Games Association
- Falkland Islands Golf Club
- Falkland Islands Hockey Association
