= Capital punishment in Uruguay =

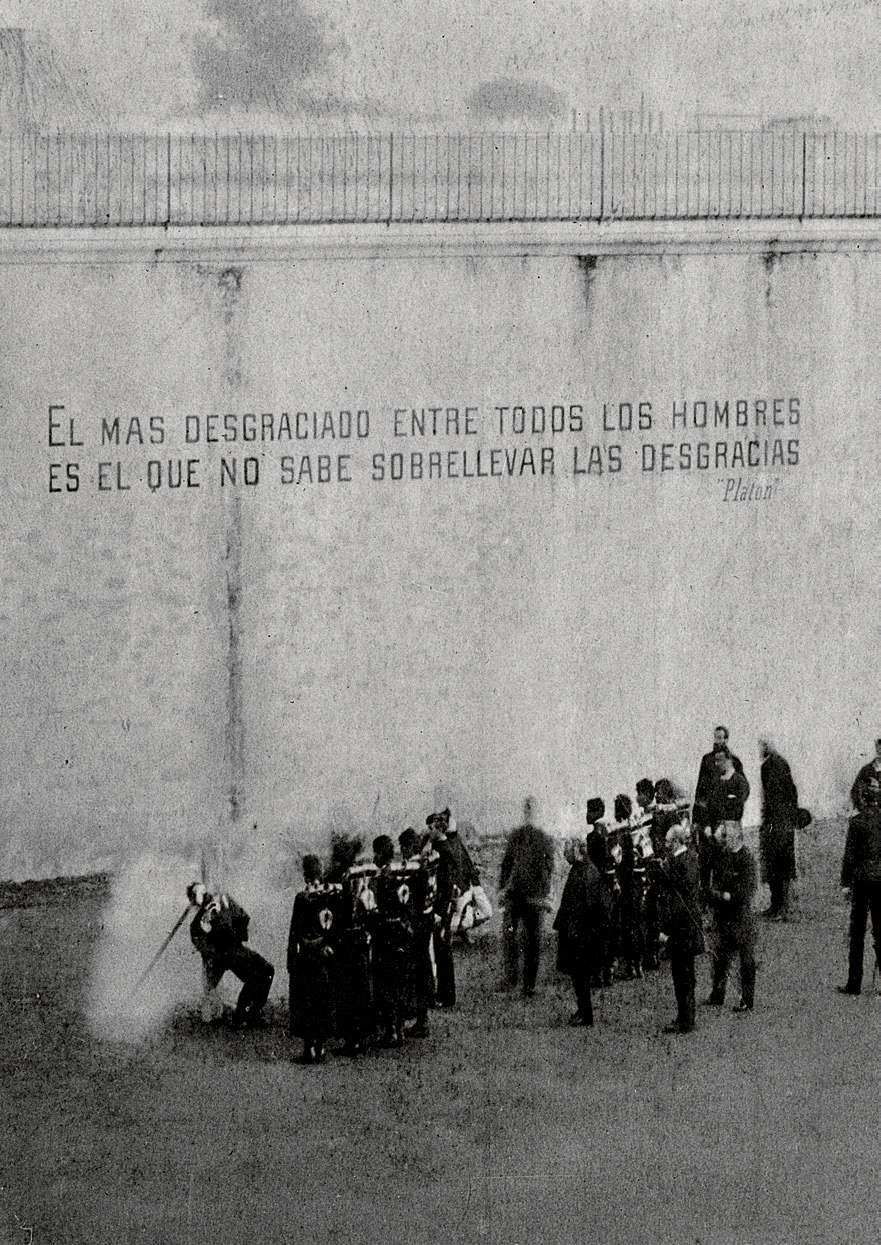
This picture shows the time of execution of criminals Facundo Luna and Carlos Bejarano in the Prison of Miguelete, Montevideo in 1892. The executions were performed in the presence of public in attendance and inmates in the prison yard. On the wall, a quote attributed to Plato can be seen: "The most wretched amongst all men is he who cannot endure misfortune".

Capital punishment in Uruguay was abolished from the legal system in 1907 by Law N° 3238, passed during the government of president Claudio Williman, and later removed from the constitutional system in 1918. The death penalty had been expressly established by Uruguayan Constitution of 1830.

== History ==
=== Colonial period ===
Capital punishment was applied since the time of Spanish colonization in the current territory of Uruguay. The usual method of execution was by hanging or, for military or political crimes, by firing squad.

In 1764, shortly after the beginning of his term as Governor of Montevideo, Agustín de la Rosa erected a gallows on the site of the present-day Constitution Square to "strengthen the peacefulness of the population and to frighten restless people". Occasionally, the death penalty was performed by garrote, in particular when the condemned was white.

=== Constitution of 1830 ===
In the first constitution of the nascent Uruguayan state, the death penalty was explicitly mentioned in articles 26 and 84, which regulate the powers of the Chamber of Representatives and the presidential pardon.

=== Abolition ===
The death penalty was abolished by Law N° 3238 of 23 September 1907, during the government of Claudio Williman. Article 1° of the law states:

The death penalty established by the Penal Code is abolished. The death penalty established by the Military Code is also abolished.

This law was passed after heated debates between abolitionists and anti-abolitionists, with the elimination of capital punishment for military crimes being particularly contentious. The law was unconstitutional at the time of its promulgation, since articles 26 and 84 of the 1830 Constitution, still then in force, explicitly sanctioned the death penalty. However, the Constitution of 1830 did not provide any protocol for the nullification of laws that contravened it. Such a mechanism does exist in the current Constitution.

In 1918, the abolition became constitutional when it was included in the new Constitution that came into force that year, which states:

The death penalty shall not be applied to anyone.
— Article 163, Constitution of 1918

All subsequent constitutions have upheld that prohibition. It can be found in the Constitution of 1967 in article 26. Uruguay's last execution was performed in the Maldonado Department on 29 September 1902.
