= Philip Isaac =

Philip Filmore Isaac is the current Anglican Archdeacon of Tobago.

Isaac was born in Tobago and excelled at sport whilst at school. He worked in the aviation industry, tourism and radio before being ordained in 1994. He worked in St Patrick's Parish and then St David's Parish in Tobago before his appointment as Archdeacon. In 2007, he lobbied for Sir Elton John to be excluded from the Plymouth Jazz Festival, saying that "his visit to the island can open the country to be tempted towards pursuing [a gay] lifestyle."
