= Human rights in the Falkland Islands =

The legal protection of human rights in the Falkland Islands is guaranteed by Chapter I of the Constitution of the Falkland Islands. The wording is broadly taken from documents such as the Universal Declaration of Human Rights and the European Convention on Human Rights, although there is a greater emphasis on the right of self-determination.
