= Prostitution in Uruguay =

Prostitution in Uruguay was legislated in 2002 through the sex work law (17.515). Before that, prostitution was unlegislated but it was not illegal, since the constitution allows any activity that is not forbidden by law. Prostitution is currently not a subject of debate.

UNAIDS estimate there to be 8,195 sex workers in Uruguay.

== Regulation ==
Uruguay's Law no. 17.515 of 2002 - Trabajo Sexual Se Dictan Norma (Sexual Work Standards Are Dictated) - explicitly states sex work is legal and provides regulations that must be adhered to. It also obliges the government to advise sex workers of their rights and duties, support them against exploitation and provide sexual health information.

The law set up a confidential National Registry of Sex Workers. Sex works must enroll in the National Registry, which requires initial and periodical health checks focused on the prevention, detection and treatments of sexually transmitted diseases. The register gives the worker a license which is necessary to work in brothels. Article 31 of the law provides penalties for selling sex without a health card, and their names are placed on the register.

Local authorities may, in consultation with sex workers, set up local sex work areas. These must not be near educational establishments and be sensitive to local opinions. The local authority may also set working hours and dictate dress code and behaviour.

Brothels and commercial sex bars are permitted provided they have the agreement of local police and are licensed. Sex may not be sold in massage establishments.

The law established a "National Honorary Commission for the Protection of Sex Work", and two sex workers sit on the commission.

In 1995, the Banco de Previsión Social (state-owned Uruguayan social security institute) recognised sex work by women. In 2009 a law was passed that recognised men and trans women in sex work.

The prostitution of a minor (person under the legal age of consent) is prohibited and the authorities have the obligation to protect them from sexual exploitation and prostitution.

Despite this, many sex workers work on the streets or independently and not always have health checks.

== Practicing ==
Prostitution must be performed in brothels (in Uruguay they have many euphemistic names like “whiskerias” or “casas de masajes”). Usually brothels use a red light as distinctive, or have discrete announcements with the name of the establishment and a suggestive phrase to attract clients.

In order to open, a brothel must have the authorization of the municipal government and the state police and follow certain rules dictated by the Ministry of Public Health. Police and municipal government are in charge of determining in which areas brothels may exist considering the characteristics of the place. However brothels may not function near schools or high schools.

Minors are not allowed to enter brothels, in addition to performing any kind of activity inside.

As any commercial establishment brothels pay taxes and have social security obligations.

Violation to the sex work law is punishable with fines. Pimping, commercial sexual exploitation of adults and minors is illegal and severely punished. The government often launches campaigns to persuade tourists and residents of not hiring or promoting minors prostitution.

There is a presence of Dominican prostitutes in Uruguay who took advantage of a formerly liberal immigration policy.

== Organizations ==
The aforementioned sex labour law created the Comisión Nacional Honoraria de Protección al Trabajo Sexual (National Honorary Commission for Protection of Sexual Work) within the Ministry of Public Health, whose aim is to advise Executive Branch on this matter, watch over the fulfillment of the law, provide counseling to sex workers and promote sexual education courses and campaigns on the matter.

There was a trade union named Asociación de Meretrices Profesionales del Uruguay, created in 1986, which comprised about 1200 women sex workers affiliates and whose purpose was the cooperation between sex workers, the defense of their rights, carrying out workshops and promote the prevention of STDs and HIV. Even received support from the UNFPA. However it was dissolved in early 2015 under accusations of corruption of its president and vicepresident, including misappropriation of donated lands intended for HIV-infected women and donated goods for beneficiaries.

== Sex trafficking ==
Uruguay is a source, transit, and destination country for women and children subjected to sex trafficking. Uruguayan women and girls—and to a more limited extent transgender adults and male adolescents—are subjected to sex trafficking within the country. Uruguayan women and LGBTI individuals are forced into prostitution in Spain, Italy, Argentina, and Brazil; however, the number of identified Uruguayan victims exploited abroad has decreased in recent years. Women from the Dominican Republic, and to a lesser extent from South American countries, are subjected to sex trafficking in Uruguay. Uruguayan officials have identified citizens of other countries, including China and the Dominican Republic, transiting Uruguay en route to other destinations, particularly Argentina, as potential victims of sex trafficking.

The United States Department of State Office to Monitor and Combat Trafficking in Persons ranks Uruguay as a 'Tier 2' country.

== See also ==
- Optional Protocol on the Sale of Children, Child Prostitution and Child Pornography
- Human rights in Uruguay

== Bibliography ==
- Núñez, Karina (2017). El ser detrás de una vagina productiva. Montevideo.
