= National symbols of Trinidad and Tobago =

National symbols of Trinidad and Tobago are the symbols that are used in Trinidad and Tobago and abroad to represent the country and its people.

Prominently, the Coat of Arms of Trinidad and Tobago is a Trinbagonian symbol, and is depicted on all its money.

The national animals are the Scarlet Ibis and The Cocorico.

== Present Symbols ==
	Symbol	Media	Notes
Flag	Flag of Trinidad and Tobago		
National Anthem	Forged from the love of liberty, In the fires of hope and prayer, With boundless faith in our Destiny, We solemnly declare, Side by side we stand, Islands of the blue Caribbean Sea, This our Native Land, We pledge our lives to Thee. Here every creed and race find an equal place, And may God bless our Nation, Here every creed and race find an equal place, And may God bless our Nation.		The National Anthem was written to celebrate Trinidad and Tobago's independence from Great Britain on August 31, 1962. A nationwide contest was held and the winner of the contest was Patrick Castagne.
Coat of Arms	Coat of Arms of Trinidad and Tobago	Coat of Arms of Trinidad and Tobago	Last modified in 2025.
National Motto	"Together We Aspire, Together We Achieve."		The national motto was established by the late first Prime Minister Dr. Eric Williams, when Trinidad and Tobago achieved independence in 1962.
National Flower	Chaconia (Warszewiczia coccinea)		The Chaconia, also known as the "Pride of Trinidad and Tobago" or "Wild Poinsettia", is an indigenous flower known by its long sprays of magnificent vermillion. Coincidentally, this flower blooms on every anniversary of our Independence Day (August 31, 1962).
National Pledge	I solemnly pledge to dedicate my life to the service of my God and my country. I will honour my parents, My teachers, my leaders and my elders, and those in authority. I will be clean and honest in all my thoughts, my words and my deeds. I will strive, in everything I do to work together with my fellowmen Of every creed and race, for the greater happiness of all and the honour and glory of my country.		
National Bird	The Scarlet Ibis and The Cocrico	Rufous-vented chachalaca The Scarlet Ibis	The Cocrico (Ortalis ruficauda), also known as the "Chachalaca," is a rufous-tailed, tropical pheasant indigenous to Tobago. They tend to inhabit the higher areas of the island amidst the forest and sometimes the dry scrubby lands bordering cultivated areas. The Scarlet Ibis (Eudocimus ruber) makes its home in the Caroni Bird Sanctuary in the Caroni Swamp—an area set aside by the government for the protection of these colourful birds.
National instrument	Steelpan		
National Colours of Trinidad and Tobago			Red, White and Black
National Watchwords	Discipline, Production, Tolerance.		The national Watchwords was established by the late first Prime Minister Dr. Eric Williams, when Trinidad and Tobago achieved independence in 1962.

== Former List of symbols ==
Symbol	Image	Started-ended
Royal anthem	"God Save the Queen"	31 August 1962 – 1 August 1976 (song dates to 1744)
Royal cypher		31 August 1962 – 1 August 1976 (dates to 1952)
Royal standard	Queen's Personal Trinidadian Flag	1966-1 August 1976
