= International rankings of Trinidad and Tobago =

National rating on multiple scales

These are the international rankings of Trinidad and Tobago.

== International rankings ==
Organization	Survey	Ranking
Institute for Economics and Peace	Global Peace Index	87 out of 144
United Nations Development Programme	Human Development Index	64 out of 182
Transparency International	Corruption Perceptions Index	79 out of 180
World Economic Forum	Global Competitiveness Report	86 out of 133
The Economist	Worldwide Quality-of-life Index, 2005	51 out of 111
The Heritage Foundation/The Wall Street Journal	Index of Economic Freedom	55 out of 157
Reporters Without Borders	Worldwide Press Freedom Index	28 out of 167
World Intellectual Property Organization	Global Innovation Index, 2026	107 out of 139
