= Elections in Bonaire =

Bonaire holds elections for the island council and the electoral colleges for the Senate.

The elections are four years apart. The next Island Council election will be held in 2027.

== See also ==
- Electoral calendar
- Electoral system
- Dutch island council elections
