= Prostitution in Trinidad and Tobago =

Prostitution in Trinidad and Tobago is legal but related activities such as brothel keeping, soliciting and pimping are illegal.

In Trinidad, Port of Spain is the main place of sex work, including street prostitution on Roberts and Murray Streets. New brothels continue to open across the country, particularly in the south where they are incorporated into small bars and rum shops and are difficult to detect, and in central, where they operate out of a normal-looking flats in a neighbourhood. Many of the sex workers come from Colombia, Dominican Republic, Venezuela, and Cuba. Some regularly commute between their home nation and Trinidad.

Prostitution is less common in Tobago, some prostitutes from Trinidad move to Tobago for the tourist season.

The country is a sex tourism destination. Tobago is also known as a destination for female sex tourism.

Sex trafficking is a problem in the country, as is child prostitution.

== Legislation ==
Being a former British colony, much of the prostitution law mirrors that of the UK:

- The 1921 Summary Offences Act
  - Section 46: any woman loitering about and soliciting passers-by for the purpose of prostitution, on the second occasion, may be deemed a rogue and vagabond, and shall be liable to imprisonment for two months
- The 1986 Sexual Offences Act
  - Section 17: Any person who procures another for prostitution; or procures another to become an inmate of or to frequent a brothel; is guilty of an offence and is liable on conviction to imprisonment for fifteen years
  - Section 19: A person who detains another against that other's will in any brothel, is guilty of an offence and is liable on conviction to imprisonment for ten years.
  - Section 22: A person who keeps or manages or acts or assists in the management of a brothel; or being the tenant, lessee, occupier or person in charge of any premises, knowingly permits the premises or any part thereof to be used as a brothel or for the purposes of prostitution; is guilty of an offence and is liable on conviction to imprisonment for five years.
  - Section 23. (1) A person who—
    - (a) knowingly lives wholly or in part on the earnings of prostitution; or
    - (b) in any place solicits for immoral purposes,

is guilty of an offence and is liable on conviction to imprisonment for five years

- Human trafficking is dealt with by the Trafficking In Persons Act 2011.

== History ==
=== Colonial period ===
During the slave period, slaves could sometimes be hired as prostitutes. After the abolition of slavery (1838), many mulatto women became prostitutes or brothel madams, often moving from rural areas to towns such as Port of Spain.

In an effort to control the spread of STIs the Contagious Diseases Ordinance was introduced in 1869. This was based in the similar British law, the Contagious Diseases Prevention Act 1864 (27 & 28 Vict. c. 85). Prostitutes were required to be registered and have regular examinations for STIs. The ordinance was suspended in 1872 and reintroduced in 1875. The register showed a significant number of prostitutes to be working in Port of Spain and San Fernando. Unscrupulous policemen took advantage of the ordinance to demand sexual favours. In Port of Spain, a Sergeant Holder was given unlimited power to enforce the ordinance. He abused his position and, following an investigation brought about by a complaint, was dismissed from the force. The ordinance was abolished in 1887.

The sugar slump of the 1880s brought many more women to the towns, turning to prostitution to try and make a living. At this time, Port of Spain was reported to have more prostitutes than any other town in the West Indies. Most of the taverns in the town were brothels, and the best brothel was reputed to be the "British Coffee House", run by a Mrs Peery. Many of the prostitutes were underage and lived on the streets.

=== 1930's ===
During the Great Depression in the 1930s, more women turned to prostitution. In his book, Calypso and Society, Gordon Rohlehr noted: "Some singers, indeed, presented the vocation of prostitution as the only alternative to that of housewifery, and warned young girls against leaving their mothers' homes."

The Report of West India Royal Commission (Moyne Report) (1960) concluded: "Commercialised prostitution is not common as a profession in the West Indies. The high percentage of promiscuity in the Colonies puts prostitution into the category of a luxury profession. When this profession is followed, it is usually for economic reasons and because the wages earned by the woman in her other occupation are often too low to obtain the necessities of life for her."

=== World War 2 ===
Prostitution was a boom industry in the 1940s after the allied troops, especially American, were stationed on the islands during WW2, especially around Port of Spain Arima. In addition to the 100,000 troops, the construction workers building the new American bases at Chaguaramas and Waller Field added to the demand for prostitution.

The spread of STIs was a problem in this era. The Governor of Trinidad and Tobago considered licensing the brothels in the country to ensure proper testing of the women, but this was never brought into force. American Lt. Col. Fox recalled that when he visited in 1941, he was assured that every taxi driver could take him to a house of pleasure with any race of woman he desired.

=== Post WW2 ===
After the closure of the US Air base at Waller Field in 1949, the demand for prostitution dropped.

Sociologist Lloyd Braithwaite noted in his 1953 survey Social Stratification in Trinidad wrote: "In the lower-class sections of the town many well-known prostitutes abide, even though technically some have no fixed place of abode...the straitened and precarious economic circumstances that face working-class girls, particularly in the towns, must constantly make prostitution a temptation to them."

The demand for prostitutes further dropped when the US Naval base at Chaguaramas was scaled back in 1956 and finally closed in 1963.

== Corruption ==
The United States Department of State reports that prostitution is historically dependent on police corruption. There is also corruption of immigration officials and police in regard to human trafficking. Police provide protection for brothels. Some moonlight at the brothels and provide tip-offs of raids. Part of their payment can be sex with the prostitutes.

In 2013, PC Valentine Eastman, a police officer for 23 years, was charged with 13 human trafficking charges around 3 Colombian women trafficked to a brothel in Marabella. He was the first person in the British Caribbean to be charged with Human trafficking. In 2016 he was committed to High Court for trial.

== Sex tourism ==
The islands are increasingly becoming a destination for sex tourism. This tourism is blamed for the rise in HIV on the island. The Trinidadian Minister of Tourism observed that the rise in HIV/AIDs on the islands was becoming severe and out of control because of sex tourism and the beach-bum phenomenon.

=== Female sex tourism ===
Tobago is known as a destination for female sex tourism. European and American women come to the island seeking local men. There is an organised tourist trade for the sex tourism; sometimes a local male is included in the price.

In 2016, Shadae Lamar Smith directed the short film The Resort based on sex tourism in Tobago. It was featured on Issa Rae's YouTube channel.

== Sex trafficking ==
Trinidad and Tobago is a destination, transit, and source country for adults and children subjected to sex trafficking. Women and girls from the Dominican Republic, Guyana, Venezuela, and Colombia are subjected to sex trafficking in brothels and clubs, often lured by offers of legitimate employment, with young women from Venezuela especially vulnerable. NGOs have previously heard reports about the availability of child sex trafficking victims advertised through classified ads and children are subjected to sex trafficking for commercial sex by Trinbagonians and foreign sex tourists. International criminal organisations are increasingly involved in trafficking. Police corruption has in the past been associated with facilitating prostitution and sex trafficking.

Most of the victims of sex trafficking are brought into the country by boat, landing on southern peninsula of Trinidad in Icacos, Cedros and other neighbouring fishing villages.

The United States Department of State Office to Monitor and Combat Trafficking in Persons ranks Trinidad and Tobago as a Tier 2 country.
