= Human rights in Trinidad and Tobago =

Human rights in Trinidad and Tobago comprise a series of rights legally protected by the Constitution of Trinidad and Tobago. Trinidad and Tobago has ratified a number of international treaties and conventions on human rights and parts or principles of these legal texts have been integrated into the domestic laws of the country. The Ministry of the Attorney General has established the International Law and Human Rights Unit to ensure adherence to these principles.

== Gender equality ==
Section 4 of the Constitution prohibits discrimination on the grounds of sex. In 2014, Trinidad and Tobago ranked 49th on the Global Gender Gap Index of the World Economic Forum, with a score of 0.715, down from its 36th place in 2013. In terms of participation in the labor force, the country ranked 87th, with 59% of women participating as opposed to 82% of men. Women on average received 66% of men's wages for similar work, constituted 29% of the parliament and occupied 6% of ministerial positions. The Gender Affairs Division of the Ministry of Gender, Youth and Child Development is committed to bettering the situation in the country, with the National Gender and Development Policy at the stage of finalization since 2011 as of 2014. In 2010, the country had its first female prime minister, Kamla Persad-Bissessar.

Violence against women, however, is on the rise, with 689 cases of sexual offenses reported in 2013, with an increase of 200 cases since 2011. According to the US Secretary of State, the government and nongovernmental organizations reported that many incidents of rape and other sexual crimes were unreported, partly due to perceived insensitivity of police, exacerbated by a wide cultural acceptance of gender-based violence. There is a lack of reliable statistics, but women's groups stated in 2013 that over 50% of the country's women suffered abuse. Many community leaders asserted that abuse of women, particularly in the form of domestic violence, continued to be a significant problem.

== Freedoms ==
=== Freedom of the press ===
In 2014, Reporters Without Borders, in its Press Freedom Index, placed Trinidad and Tobago at the 43rd place, with a score of 23.28, corresponding to a "satisfactory situation". In the same year, Freedom House classified Trinidad and Tobago as "free" in terms of press freedom, which is the highest level available. There were cases brought against journalists for libel in 2012, but no such cases occurred in 2013 and efforts were made to exempt investigative journalists from such charges. There were reportedly occasional attempts to influence the press by the politicians, for instance, three senior journalists resigned in the Trinidad Guardian to protest alleged governmental interference and the prime minister publicly criticized the press. There was also an alleged governmental "smear campaign" against two journalists who had investigated the activities of the national security minister and the Attorney General. However, there are active political weekly newspapers and all of the daily and weekly newspapers are privately owned, with no restrictions on access to the Internet.

=== Freedom of religion ===
The freedom of religion in Trinidad and Tobago is protected by both domestic legal framework and international conventions, namely Section 4 of the Constitution, protecting the "freedom of conscience and religious belief and observance" and the International Covenant on Civil and Political Rights. According to the United States Secretary of State Report 2022, members of the government often participated in the ceremonies and holidays of various religious groups, regularly emphasizing religious tolerance and harmony, and government officials routinely spoke publicly against religious intolerance.

== Human trafficking ==
According to the US Secretary of State, as of 2013, Trinidad and Tobago is a destination, transit, and possible source country for adults and children subjected to sex trafficking and adults subjected to forced labor. Women and girls from the Dominican Republic, Guyana, Venezuela, and Colombia were reportedly subjected to sex trafficking in Trinidadian brothels and clubs. Economic migrants from the Caribbean region and from Asia, including India and China, are vulnerable to forced labor. Cases of forced labor have occurred in domestic service and in the retail sector. Law enforcement officials report Trinidadian children were vulnerable to sex trafficking and forced labor, including the coerced selling of drugs.

A 2013 study indicated individuals in establishments, such as brothels or nightclubs, throughout Trinidad recruit women and girls for the commercial sex trade and keep their passports; withholding a passport is a common indicator of human trafficking. This report also revealed that economic migrants who lack legal status may be exposed to various forms of exploitation and abuse, which are indicative of human trafficking. According to the American report, while the government did not comply with the minimum standards for the elimination of trafficking, there was significant progress; during the reporting period, the government vigorously investigated trafficking offenses and, for the first time, formally charged suspected trafficking offenders under its 2011 anti-trafficking law.

The cases of human trafficking were also confirmed by Trinidadian officials. There were 42 reported cases of human trafficking between 2007 and 2013, but this was not believed to reflect the extent of the problem fully. There were no officially documented cases of trafficking of children.
