= CNN Heroes =

Television special created by CNN

- Also known as: CNN Heroes: An All-Star Tribute
- Country of origin: United States
- No. of seasons: 19

Production
- Executive producers: Mark Doctrow; Kelly Flynn; Joel Gallen; Ian Stewart; Hamish Hamilton
- Running time: 120 minutes

Original release
- Network: CNN
- Release: December 6, 2007 – present

CNN Heroes: An All-Star Tribute is a television special created by CNN to honor individuals who make extraordinary contributions to humanitarian aid and make a difference in their communities. The program was started in 2007. Since 2016, the program was hosted by Anderson Cooper and Kelly Ripa. Honorees are introduced during the fall of each year and the audience is encouraged to vote online for the CNN Hero of the Year. Ten recipients are honored and each receive US$10,000. The top recipient is chosen as the CNN Hero of the Year and receives an additional US$100,000 to continue their work. During the broadcast celebrating their achievements, the honorees are introduced by celebrities who actively support their charity work. To celebrate the 10th anniversary, the 2016 edition had an additional segment where five previous Hero of the Year winners were chosen as candidates for the Superhero of the Year award, which was decided with an online poll.

== Heroes ==
=== 2007 ===
The 18 CNN Heroes finalists for 2007 were (in alphabetical order):

- Florence Cassassuce, La Paz, Mexico
- Kayla Cornale, of Burlington, Ontario, Canada
- Mathias Craig, of San Francisco
- Irania Martinez Garcia, of Guantanamo, Cuba
- Pablo Fajardo, of Ecuador
- Rangina Hamidi, of Stone Ridge, Virginia, United States
- Rick Hodes, of Addis Ababa, Ethiopia
- Lynwood Hughes, of Rocky Mount, North Carolina, United States
- Dallas Jessup, of Vancouver, Washington, United States
- Peter Kithene, of Seattle, Washington, United States
- Scott Loeff, of Chicago, Illinois, United States
- Mark Maksimowicz, of St. Petersburg, Florida, United States
- James McDowell, of Patchogue, New York, United States
- Anne McGee, of Las Vegas, Nevada, United States
- Josh Miller, of Santa Monica, California, United States
- Rosemary Nyirumbe, of Uganda
- Steve Peifer, of Kijabe, Kenya
- S. Ramakrishnan, of Ayikydy, India
- Julie Rems-Smario, of Oakland, California, United States
- Scott Southworth, of USA

=== 2008 ===
The Top 10 CNN Heroes of 2008 were (in alphabetical order):

- Tad Agoglia, of Long Island, New York, United States
- Yohannes Gebregeorgis, of Addis Ababa, Ethiopia
- Carolyn LeCroy, of Norfolk, Virginia, United States
- Anne Mahlum, of Philadelphia, Pennsylvania, United States
- Liz McCartney, of St. Bernard Parish, Louisiana, United States: CNN 2008 Hero of the Year
- Phymean Noun, of Toronto, Ontario, Canada
- David Puckett, of Savannah, Georgia, United States
- Maria Ruiz, of El Paso, Texas, United States
- Marie Da Silva, of (Malawi), residing in Los Angeles, California, United States
- Viola Vaughn, of Kaolack, Senegal

=== 2009 ===
The Top 10 CNN Heroes of 2009 were (in alphabetical order):

- Jorge Munoz, of Queens, New York, United States
- Jordan Thomas, of Chattanooga, Tennessee, United States
- Budi Soehardi, of Kupang, Indonesia
- Betty Makoni, of London, United Kingdom
- Doc Hendley, of Blowing Rock, North Carolina, United States
- Efren Peñaflorida, of Cavite City, Philippines: 2009 CNN Hero of the Year
- Derrick Tabb, of New Orleans, Louisiana, United States
- Roy Foster, of Palm Beach, Florida, United States
- Andrea Ivory, of West Park, Florida, United States
- Brad Blauser, of Dallas, Texas, United States

=== 2010 ===
The top 10 CNN Heroes of 2010 (in alphabetical order):

- Guadalupe Arizpe De La Vega of Juarez, Mexico
- Susan Burton of California, United States
- Linda Fondren of Mississippi, United States
- Anuradha Koirala of Kathmandu, Nepal: 2010 CNN Hero of the year
- Narayanan Krishnan of Madurai, India
- Magnus MacFarlane-Barrow of Scotland, United Kingdom
- Harmon Parker of Kenya, Africa
- Aki Ra of Siem Reap, Cambodia
- Evans Wadongo of Kenya, Africa
- Dan Wallrath of Texas, United States

Also all of the 33 Chilean Miners came on the show to be honored after the 2010 Copiapó mining accident before awards were given out to the list of heroes shown above. Kareem Taylor is the promotional voice for the commercial campaign leading up to the show.

=== 2011 ===
The top 10 CNN Heroes of 2011 (in alphabetical order):

- Eddie Canales of Texas, United States
- Taryn Davis of North Carolina, United States
- Sal Dimiceli of Wisconsin, United States
- Derreck Kayongo of Atlanta, United States
- Diane Latiker of Chicago, United States
- Robin Lim of Bali, Indonesia: 2011 CNN Hero of the year
- Patrice Millet of Haiti
- Bruno Serato of Anaheim, California, United States
- Richard St. Denis of Mexico
- Amy Stokes of South Africa

=== 2012 ===
The top 10 CNN Heroes of 2012 (in alphabetical order):

- Pushpa Basnet of Kathmandu, Nepal: 2012 CNN Hero of the year
- Wanda Butts of Ohio, United States
- Mary Cortani of California, United States
- Catalina Escobar of Cartagena, Colombia
- Razia Jan of Afghanistan, with an organization located in Massachusetts, United States
- Thulani Madondo of Kliptown, South Africa
- Leo McCarthy of Montana, United States
- Connie Siskowski of New Jersey, United States
- Scott Strode of Colorado, United States
- Malya Villard-Appolon of Kofaviv, Haiti

The 3 Young Wonders of 2012 (in alphabetical order):

- Cassandra Lin
- Will Lourcey
- Jessica Rees

=== 2013 ===
The top 10 CNN Heroes of 2013 (in alphabetical order):

- Dale Beatty, co-founder of Purple Heart Homes
- George Bwelle
- Robin Emmons
- Danielle Gletow, founder of One Simple Wish
- Tawanda Jones
- Richard Nares
- Kakenya Ntaiya
- Chad Pregracke of the USA: 2013 CNN Hero of the year
- Estella Pyfrom, creator of "Estalla's Brilliant Bus"
- Laura Stachel

=== 2014 ===
The top 10 CNN Heroes of 2014 (in alphabetical order):

- Arthur Bloom of the United States
- Jon Burns of the United Kingdom
- Pen Farthing of the United Kingdom: 2014 CNN Hero of the year
- Elimelech Goldberg of the United States
- Leela Hazzah of Kenya
- Patricia Kelly of the United States
- Annette March-Grier of the United States
- Ned Norton of the United States
- Juan Pablo Romero Fuentes of Guatemala
- Dr. Wendy Ross of the United States

The 3 Young Wonders of 2014 (in alphabetical order):

- Lily Born
- Maria Keller, Read Indeed,
- Joshua Williams, Joshua's Heart

=== 2015 ===
The top 10 CNN Heroes of 2015:

- Maggie Doyne, of New Jersey, United States: 2015 CNN Hero of the year
- Jim Withers, United States
- Monique Pool, of Suriname
- Richard Joyner, United States
- Sean Gobin, United States
- Bhagwati Agrawal, India
- Kim Carter, United States
- Rochelle Ripley, United States
- Jody Farley-Berens
- Daniel Ivankovich, United States

=== 2016 ===
The top 10 CNN Heroes of 2016:

- Jeison Aristizábal of Cali, Colombia: 2016 CNN Hero of the year
- Craig Dodson, United States
- Sherri Franklin, United States
- Brad Ludden, United States
- Luma Mufleh, United States
- Georgie Smith, United States
- Umra Omar, Kenya
- Sheldon Smith, United States
- Becca Stevens, United States
- Harry Swimmer, United States
- Pushpa Basnet, of Kathmandu, Nepal: 10th Anniversary CNN SuperHero

=== 2017 ===
The top 10 CNN Heroes of 2017:

- Stan Hays
- Samir Lakhani
- Jennifer Maddox
- Rosie Mashale
- Andrew Manzi
- Leslie Morissette
- Mona Patel
- Khali Sweeney
- Aaron Valencia
- Amy Wright: 2017 CNN Hero of the year

=== 2018 ===
The top 10 CNN Heroes of 2018:

- Abisoye Ajayi-Akinfolarin
- Maria Rose Belding
- Amanda Boxtel
- Rob Gore
- Luke Mickelson
- Susan Munsey
- Florence Phillips
- Ricardo Pun-Chong: 2018 CNN Hero of the Year
- Ellen Stackable
- Chris Stout

=== 2019 ===
The top 10 CNN Heroes of 2019 each received US$10,000. The 2019 CNN Hero of the Year received an additional US$100,000. The top 10 CNN Heroes of 2019:

- Staci Alonso, Noah's Animal House (pet shelter for escaping domestic violence)
- Najah Bazzy, Zaman International (helping women & children living in poverty)
- Woody Faircloth, RV4CampfireFamily.org
- Freweini Mebrahtu, 2019 CNN Hero of the Year, Dignity Period (helping Ethiopian girls stay in school)
- Mark Meyers
- Richard Miles
- Roger Montoya
- Mary Robinson
- Afroz Shah
- Zach Wigal

The 4 Young Wonders of 2019 (in alphabetical order):

- Jemima Browning, Tadcaster Stingrays
- Grace Callwood, We Cancerve Movement
- Bradley Ferguson, Post Crashers
- Jahkil Jackson, Project I Am

=== 2020 ===
The 14th Annual CNN Heroes: An All-Star Tribute focused solely on inspirational heroes from the biggest stories of the year—the fight against coronavirus and the battle for racial equity and social justice. Frontline workers, advocates, scientists, Young Wonders and everyday people were saluted and 8 nonprofit organizations working to tackle these issues were highlighted. Each organization received $10,000 and viewers were encouraged to donate to these vetted, trusted organizations.

In lieu of the traditional Top 10 and CNN Hero of the Year, the 2020 edition saw viewers selecting the year's Most Inspirational Moments.

The nonprofit organizations highlighted included:

- AdoptAClassroom.org
- Bring Change To Mind
- Center for Disaster Philanthropy
- Equal Justice Initiative
- IssueVoter
- Make-A-Wish America
- Water.org
- World Central Kitchen

The 3 Young Wonders of 2020 (in alphabetical order):

- Cavanaugh Bell, Cool & Dope
- Tiana Day, Youth Advocates for Change
- TJ Kim, Operation SOS

=== 2021 ===
The 15th Annual CNN Heroes All-Star Tribute returned to the long-running shows' traditional format honoring the Top 10 CNN Heroes of 2021 with viewers voting online for the CNN Hero of the Year. Shirley Raines was selected as the 2021 CNN Hero of the Year.

Honorees included:

- Jennifer Colpas, Colombia - Tierra Grata
- Lynda Doughty, United States - Marine Mammals of Maine
- David Flink, United States - Eye To Eye
- Dr. Patricia Gordon, United States - Cure Cervical Cancer
- Hector Guadalupe, United States - A Second U Foundation
- Michele Neff Hernandez, United States - Soaring Spirits
- Zannah Mustapha, Nigeria - Future Prowess Islamic Foundation
- Shirley Raines, United States - Beauty 2 The Streetz
- Made Janur Yasa, Indonesia - Plastic Exchange

Young Wonders recognized included:

- Chelsea Phaire, United States - Chelsea's Charity
- Jordan Mittler, United States - Mittler Senior Technology

=== 2022 ===
The 16th Annual CNN Heroes: An All-Star Tribute premiered live on Sunday December 11, 2022. Nelly Cheboi was selected by viewers as the 2022 CNN Hero of the Year.

Honorees included:

- Carie Broeker - Pacific Grove, CA
- Richard Casper - Nashville, TN
- Nelly Cheboi - Mogotio, Kenya and Shabbona, IL
- Nora El-Khouri Spencer - Carrboro, NC
- Tyrique Glasgow - Philadelphia, PA
- Teresa Gray - Anchorage, AK
- Meymuna Hussein-Cattan - Santa Ana, CA
- Aidan Reilly - Santa Ana, CA
- Debra Vines - Maywood, IL
- Bobby Wilson - Atlanta, GA

Young Wonders recognized included:

- Ruby Chitsey - Harrison, AR
- Sri Nihal Tammana - Edison, NJ

=== 2023 ===
The 17th Annual CNN Heroes: An All-Star Tribute premiered live on Sunday December 10, 2023. Dr. Kwane Stewart was selected by viewers as the 2023 CNN Hero of the Year. Former President Jimmy Carter and the late First Lady Rosalynn Carter were awarded the inaugural CNN Heroes Legacy Award for their lifetime commitment to community service.

2023 CNN Hero of the Year: Dr. Kwane Stewart (veterinarian who treats the pets of the homeless for free, helping the pets and the humans who love them dearly)

Honorees included:

- Yasmine Arrington Brooks - ScholarCHIPS – Washington DC
- Osei Boateng - OBK Hope Foundation – Somerset, NJ and Ghana
- Stacey Buckner - Off-Road Outreach – Fayetteville, NC
- Mike Goldberg - I.CARE – Islamorada, FL
- Tescha Hawley - Day Eagle Hope Project – Fort Belknap Reservation, MT
- Alvin Irby - Barbershop Books – New York, NY
- Adam Pearce - Love Your Brain – Norwich, VT
- Estefanía Rebellón - Yes We Can World Foundation – Burbank, CA and Mexico
- Mama Shu - Avalon Village – Highland Park, MI
- Dr. Kwane Stewart - Project Street Vet – San Diego, CA

Young Wonders recognized included:

- Emily Bhatnagar - For Love & Buttercup – Gaithersburg, MD
- Steven Hoffen - Growing Peace – New York, NY

=== 2024 ===
The 18th Annual CNN Heroes: An All-Star Tribute premiered Sunday December 8, 2024. Hosted by CNN's Anderson Cooper and Laura Coates. The year's Top 5 CNN Heroes were all recognized, with Stephen Knight selected by viewers as the 2024 CNN Hero of the Year. Beloved actor and public figure Michael J. Fox was honored with the 2nd Annual CNN Heroes Legacy Award for his lifetime commitment to bringing hope to those diagnosed with Parkinson’s Disease.

Honorees included:

- Ron Davis Alvarez, Dream Orchestra – Gothenburg, Sweden
- Stephen Knight, Dogs Matter – Dallas, TX
- Payton McGriff, SHE (Style Her Empowered) – Moscow, ID & Nôtse, Togo
- Rachel Rutter, Project Libertad – Phoenixville, PA
- Yamilée Toussaint, STEM From Dance – Brooklyn, NY

Young Wonders recognized included:

- Brooke and Breanna Bennett – Women in Training, Inc. – Montgomery, AL

=== 2025 ===
The 19th Annual CNN Heroes show aired in 2025.

== Awards ==
In 2022, the program was honored with the News & Documentary Emmy Award for Outstanding Live News Special for its 2021 15th Annual Show. The program's director Brett Kelly was also nominated for Outstanding Direction and the original full-length CNN Heroes segment on Shirley Raines of Beauty 2 The Streetz was nominated for Outstanding Soft Feature Story: Short Form.

In 2020, the program's director, Brett Kelly, received the inaugural Outstanding Direction News & Documentary Emmy Award for its 2019 13th Annual Show. In 2019, the program was nominated for the News & Documentary Emmy Award for Outstanding News Special for its 2018 12th Annual show.

In 2017, the program received a News & Documentary Emmy Award for Outstanding Lighting Direction and Scenic Design its 2016 10th Annual show. In 2012, the program received a Peabody Award for its 2011 campaign and show. CNN Heroes has also been nominated for additional News & Documentary Emmy Awards and is the winner of 3 Gracies and multiple National Association of Black Journalists Salute to Excellence Awards.

== See also ==
- List of awards for volunteerism and community service
