= Charity (practice) =

Voluntary giving of help to those in need

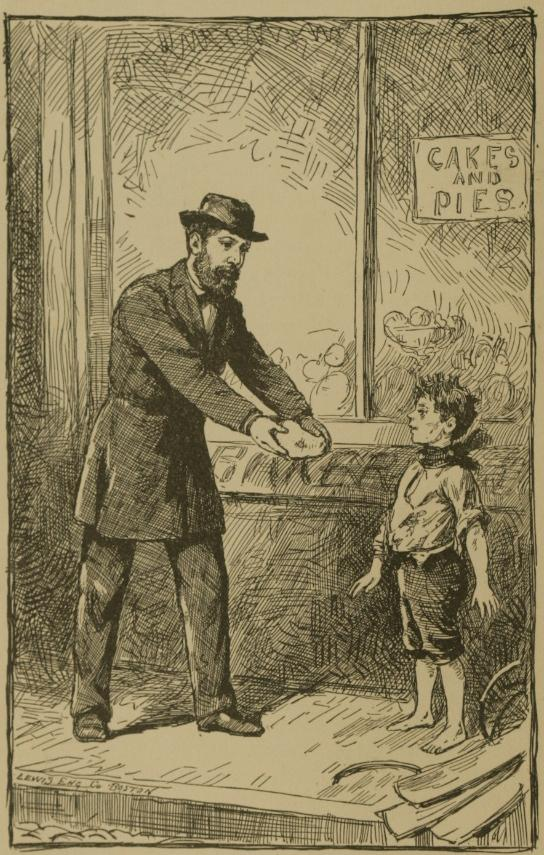
Illustration of charity, c. 1884

Charity is the voluntary provision of assistance to those in need. It serves as a humanitarian act, and is unmotivated by self-interest. Various philosophical views about charity exist, which are often associated with religion.

== Etymology ==
The word charity originated in late Old English to mean a "Christian love for one's fellows", and until at least the beginning of the 20th century, this meaning remained synonymous with charity. Apart from this original meaning, charity is etymologically linked to Christianity, with the word originally entering the English language through the Old French word charité, which derived from the Latin caritas, a word commonly used in the Vulgate New Testament to translate the Greek word agape (ἀγάπη), a distinct form of love.

Over time, the meaning of charity has evolved from "Christian love" to "providing for those in need; generosity and giving" (cf. offertory), a transition that began with the Old French word charité. Thus, while the older Douay-Rheims and King James versions of the Bible translate instances of agape (such as those appearing in 1 Corinthians 13) as "charity", modern English versions of the Bible typically translate agape as "love".

== Practice ==
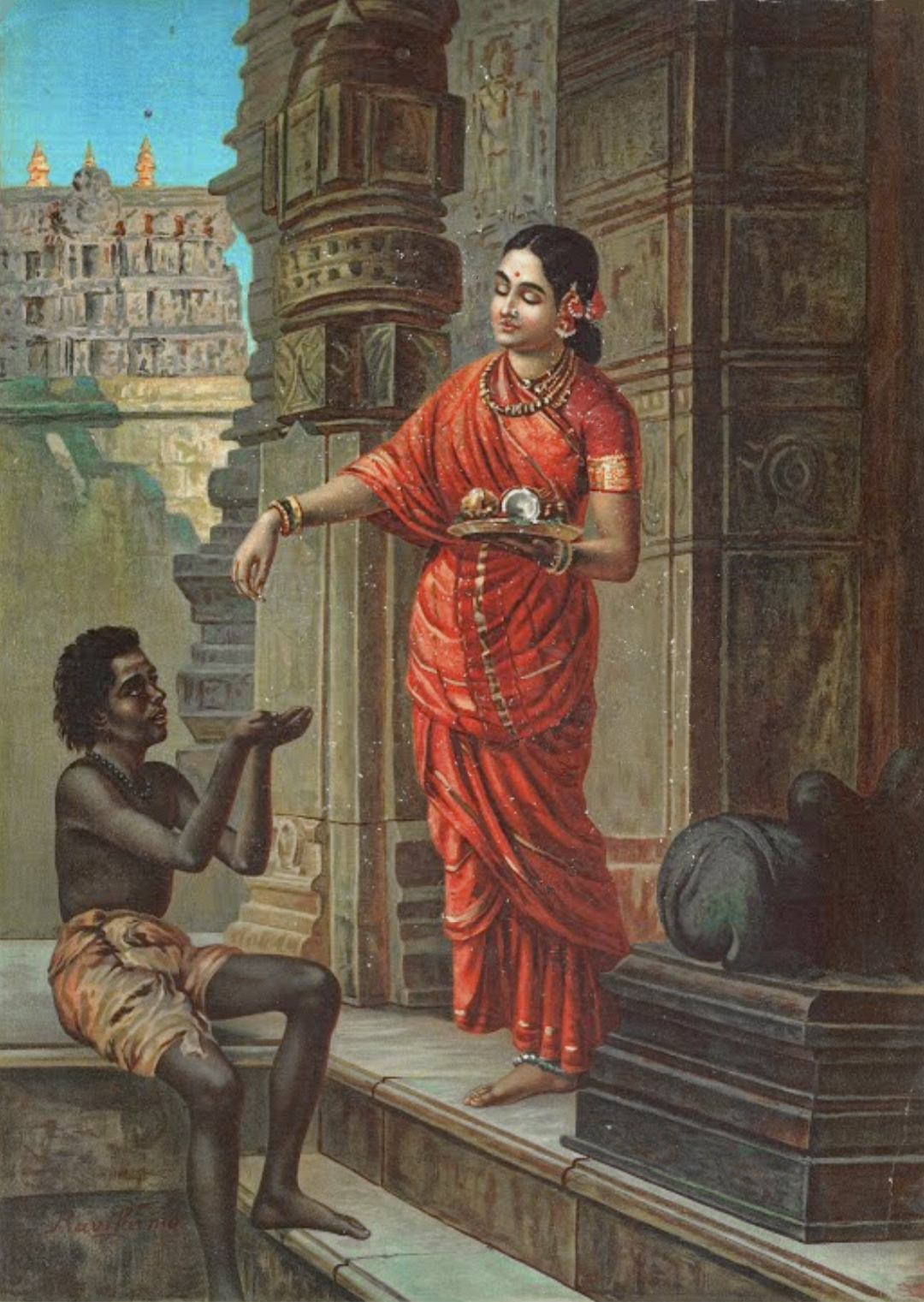
A Hindu woman giving alms (painting by Raja Ravi Varma)

Charitable giving is the act of donating money, goods, or time to the less fortunate, either directly or through a charitable trust or another worthy cause. Charitable giving as a religious act or duty is referred to as almsgiving or alms. The name stems from the most obvious expression of the virtue of charity: providing recipients with the means they need to survive. The impoverished, particularly widows, orphans, the ailing, and the injured, are generally considered appropriate recipients of charity. People who cannot support themselves and lack external means of support sometimes become "beggars," directly seeking help from strangers in public.

Some groups believe that charity is best directed towards other members of their specific group. Although giving to those closely connected to oneself is sometimes considered charity, as in the saying "Charity begins at home", charity usually involves giving to those who are not related. Terms like filial piety describe supporting one's family and friends. Treating relatives as strangers in need of charity has led to the phrase "as cold as charity": providing for one's relatives as if they were strangers, without affection. Behavioural psychology describes the feeling derived from the practice of charitable giving as having an impact on how much and how often people give. The "warm glow" of giving has been described as an intrinsic benefit received from charitable giving as first described by James Andreoni. Feelings derived from giving can be positive or negative for individuals.

Most forms of charity focus on providing basic necessities such as food, water, clothing, healthcare, and shelter. However, other actions can also be considered charitable: visiting the imprisoned or homebound, ransoming captives, educating orphans, and supporting social movements. Donations to causes that indirectly benefit the less fortunate, like funding cancer research, also fall under the category of charity.

Regarding religious aspects, recipients of charity may offer prayers for the benefactor. In medieval Europe, it was customary to provide meals to the poor at funerals in exchange for their prayers for the deceased. Institutions may honor benefactors by displaying their names or even naming buildings or the institution itself after them. When the recipient provides something of substantial value in return, the transaction is usually not labeled as charity.

In the past, many charitable organizations followed a "charitable model" in which donors gave to conglomerates which then distributed to recipients. Examples include the Make a Wish Foundation and the World Wildlife Fund. Nowadays, some charities allow online donations through websites like JustGiving. Originally, charity involved the benefactor directly giving goods to the receiver. This practice continues with some individuals, such as "CNN Hero" Sal Dimiceli, and service organizations like the Jaycees. With the rise of more social peer-to-peer processes, many charities are moving away from the charitable model, adopting a more direct donor-to-recipient approach. Examples include Global Giving (direct funding of community development projects in developing countries), DonorsChoose (for U.S.-based projects), Kiva (funding loans administered by microfinance organizations in developing countries), and Zidisha (funding individual microfinance borrowers directly).

Institutions developed to assist the poor, and these charities now constitute the majority of charitable giving in terms of monetary value. These institutions include orphanages, food banks, religious institutes dedicated to helping the poor, hospitals, organizations that visit the homebound and imprisoned, and many others. These institutions allow individuals who may not have the time or inclination to care for the poor directly to enable others to do so. They provide funding for the work and support those who do it. Institutions can also work to distinguish genuine need from fraudulent claims of charity. Early Christians particularly emphasized the care of the less fortunate as the responsibility of the local bishop.

Various studies have examined who gives more to charity. A study in the United States found that as income decreases, charitable giving increases as a percentage of income. For instance, the poorest fifth of Americans donated 4.3% of their income, while the wealthiest fifth donated 2.1%. In absolute terms, this translated to an average donation of $453 from an average income of $10,531, compared to $3,326 from an income of $158,388.

Research also indicates that "individuals who are religious are more likely to give money to charitable organizations" and tend to give more than those who are not religious. A study by the Institute for Social Policy and Understanding examined philanthropic and charitable giving among members of American religious communities. The study found that American Muslim donation patterns align mostly with other American faith groups, like Christian (Protestant and Catholic), and Jewish communities, but American Muslims are more likely to donate due to a sense of religious obligation and a belief in helping those in need. The study also revealed that most American faith groups prioritize charity for their own places of worship in monetary donations, and then for other causes. Muslims and Jews contributed more to civil rights protection organizations than other religious groups, while Christians were more likely to make charitable contributions to youth and family services, with Evangelicals giving the most, followed by Mainline Protestants and Roman Catholics.

A 2021 study discovered that when potential donors had to choose between two similar donation targets, they were more likely to choose not to donate at all.

=== Criticisms ===
A philosophical critique of charity can be found in Oscar Wilde's essay The Soul of Man Under Socialism, in which he refers to it as "a ridiculously inadequate mode of partial restitution... usually accompanied by some impertinent attempt on the part of the sentimentalist to tyrannize over [the poor's] private lives". He also views it as a remedy that perpetuates the "disease" of poverty instead of curing it. Slavoj Žižek approves of Wilde's thoughts and adds his own interpretation of the effect of charity on the charitable:

When confronted with a starving child and told, "For the price of a couple of cappuccinos, you can save her life!" the true message is: "For the price of a couple of cappuccinos, you can continue in your ignorant and pleasurable life, not only without feeling guilty but even feeling good for participating in the struggle against suffering!"

— Žižek, Slavoj (2010). Living in the End Times. Verso. p. 117.

In his 1845 treatise on the condition of the working class in England, Friedrich Engels highlights that charitable giving, whether by governments or individuals, is often an attempt to mask unpleasant suffering. Engels cites a letter to an English newspaper editor complaining about beggars who try to invoke pity by displaying their tattered clothing and ailments. Engels also points out that charity is seen as a way for the wealthy to avoid further inconvenience and discomfort, highlighting the self-interest of the bourgeoisie.

Reinhold Niebuhr, an American theologian, suggests that charity often substitutes for true justice. In his work Moral Man and Immoral Society, he criticizes charities that fund Black education, arguing that they fail to address the root causes of inequality. Niebuhr states that charity can be a way for the powerful to maintain control while avoiding addressing systemic issues.

Peter Singer, a philosopher, criticizes much charitable giving, particularly when it favors recipients who are nearby and visible. He argues that the interests of all individuals should be given equal consideration, regardless of their location or citizenship status.

In 2012, the free market think tank Institute of Economic Affairs published a report called "Sock Puppets: How the government lobbies itself and why", which criticizes governments funding charities that then lobby for changes desired by the government.

Pope Leo XIV responds to unnamed critics who "dismiss or ridicule charitable works, as if they were an obsession on the part of a few, and not the burning heart of the Church's mission", arguing that such critics should "go back and re-read the Gospel, lest we risk replacing it with the wisdom of this world".

==== Needs-based versus rights-based debate ====
Growing awareness of poverty and food insecurity has sparked debates among scholars about the needs-based versus the rights-based approach. The needs-based approach provides recipients with what they require, without expecting a specific response. Examples of needs-based approaches include charitable giving, philanthropy, and other private investments. In contrast, a rights-based approach involves active participation from both ends, with recipients having a say in policies. Politically, a rights-based approach might involve income redistribution, minimum wage regulations, and cash subsidies. Mariana Chilton, in the American Journal of Public Health, suggested that current government policies reflect the needs-based approach, perpetuating the misconception that charity alone can address basic needs insecurity. Chilton argued for increased government accountability, transparency, and public participation, along with recognizing the vulnerability and discrimination caused by existing policies. She advocated for federal legislation to establish social safety nets through entitlement programs, such as SNAP. Chilton concluded with four strategies for a national plan: 1) monitoring to assess threats to food insecurity, 2) improving coordination at different levels, 3) enhancing accountability, and 4) involving the public in policy construction.

Amelia Barwise supported Chilton's argument by discussing the implications of philanthropy. She indicated that philanthropy can lead to tax avoidance and decrease opportunities for comprehensive welfare policies. Additionally, philanthropy might dilute an institution's mission and grant undue power to donors. Barwise highlighted that Americans' distrust of the government often drives them towards private and de-politicized actions like charity. Her research explored the consequences of philanthropic actions and suggested more effective uses of philanthropic funds. She argued for increased federal funding for welfare policies and criticized philanthropy for diverting resources from public support.

== Philosophies ==
=== Charity in Christianity ===
In medieval Europe during the 12th and 13th centuries, Latin Christendom underwent a charitable revolution. Rich patrons founded many leprosaria and hospitals for the sick and poor. New confraternities and religious orders emerged with the primary mission of engaging in intensive charitable work. Historians debate the causes. Some argue that this movement was spurred by economic and material forces, as well as a burgeoning urban culture. Other scholars argue that developments in spirituality and devotional culture were central. For still other scholars, medieval charity was primarily a way to elevate one's social status and affirm existing hierarchies of power.

=== Tzedakah in Judaism ===
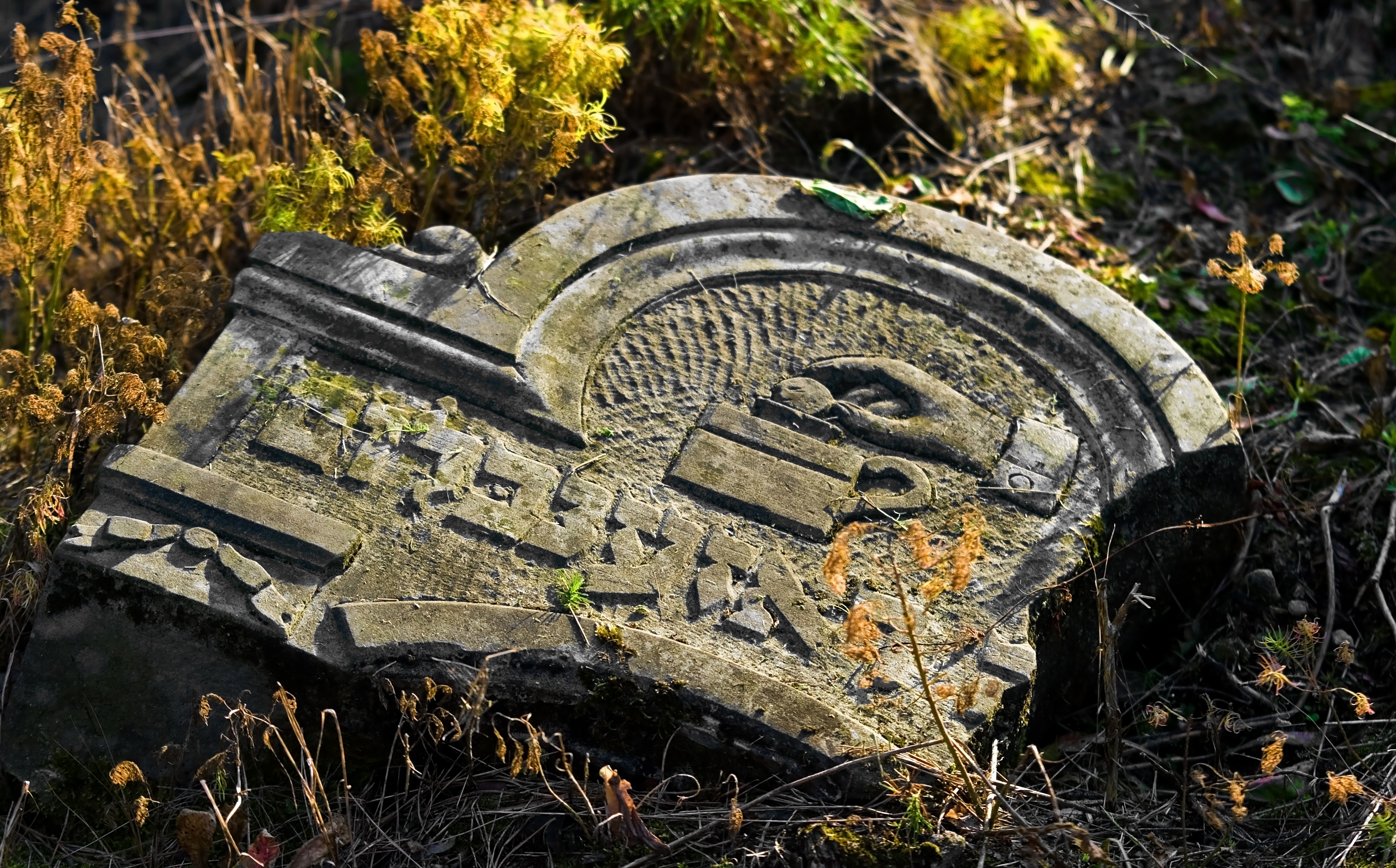
Sandstone vestige of a Jewish gravestone depicting a Tzedakah box (pushke). Jewish cemetery in Otwock (Karczew-Anielin), Poland.

In religious Judaism, tzedakah—a Hebrew term literally meaning righteousness but commonly used to signify charity—refers to the religious obligation to do what is right and just. Because it is commanded by the Torah and not voluntary, the practice is not technically an act of charity; such a concept is virtually nonexistent in Jewish tradition. Jews give tzedakah, which can take the form of money, time, and resources to the needy, out of "righteousness" and "justice" rather than benevolence, generosity, or charitableness. The Torah requires that 10 percent of a Jew's income be allotted to righteous deeds or causes, regardless if the receiving party is rich or poor. However, if one regards Judaism in its wider modern meaning, acts of charity can go far beyond the religious prescriptions of tzedakah and also beyond the wider concept of ethical obligation.

=== Zakat and sadaqah in Islam ===
In Islam, there are two methods of charity: zakat and sadaqa.

Zakat is one of the five pillars upon which the Muslim religion is based. 2.5% of one's savings is compulsory to be given as zakat per Islamic calendar year, provided that the saving is beyond the threshold limit, called nisab, usually determined by the religious authority.

Sadaqa is a voluntary charity or contribution. Sadaqa can be given using money, personal items, time, or other resources. There is no minimum or maximum requirement for sadaqa. Even smiling to other people is considered a sadaqa.

The Quran also encourages charitable spending by comparing those who spend their wealth in the way of God to a grain that produces seven ears, with a hundred grains in each ear.

=== Dāna in Indian religions ===
In Hinduism, Buddhism, and Jainism, the practice of charity is called dāna or daana. It is the virtue of generosity or giving. Dāna has been defined in traditional texts, state Krishnan and Manoj, as "any action of relinquishing the ownership of what one considered or identified as one's own, and investing the same in a recipient without expecting anything in return". Karna, Mahabali and Harishchandra are heroes also known for giving charity.

The earliest known discussion of charity as a virtuous practice, in Indian texts, is in Rigveda. According to other ancient texts of Hinduism, dāna can take the form of feeding or giving to an individual in distress or need. It can also take the form of philanthropic public projects that empower and help many.

Dāna leads to one of the perfections (pāramitā). This can be characterized by unattached and unconditional generosity, giving and letting go.

Historical records, such as those by the Persian historian Abū Rayḥān al-Bīrūnī who visited India in early 11th century, suggest dāna has been an ancient and medieval era practice among Indian religions.

=== Effective altruism ===
Effective altruism is a philosophy and social movement that uses evidence and reasoning to determine the most effective ways to benefit others. Effective altruism encourages individuals to consider all causes and actions and to act in the way that brings about the greatest positive impact, based upon their values. It is the broad, evidence-based, and cause-neutral approach that distinguishes effective altruism from traditional altruism or charity. Effective altruism is part of the larger movement towards evidence-based practices.

While a substantial proportion of effective altruists have focused on the nonprofit sector, the philosophy of effective altruism applies more broadly to prioritizing the scientific projects, companies, and policy initiatives which can be estimated to save lives, help people, or otherwise have the biggest benefit. People associated with the movement include philosopher Peter Singer, Facebook co-founder Dustin Moskovitz, Cari Tuna, Oxford-based researchers William MacAskill and Toby Ord, professional poker player Liv Boeree, and writer Jacy Reese Anthis.

== See also ==
- Alms
- Altruism
- Baksheesh
- Charitable organization
- Charity badge
- Charitable trust
- Charity fraud
- Dāna
- Effective altruism
- Evangelical counsels
- Foundation (charity)
- Fundraising
- Generosity
- Indulgence
- International Day of Charity
- P2P Charity
- Philanthropy
- Pro bono
- Selfless service
- Tzedakah
- Zakat
- International Red Cross and Red Crescent Movement
- Social policy
