= ACT for Mental Health =

Non-profit organization based in California

- Established: 1956; 70 years ago
- Founder: Wanda Irene Alexander Broadie
- Type: Nonprofit
- Tax ID no.: 77-0227659
- Legal status: Charity
- Purpose: To empower and rehabilitate the socially, mentally, economically and/or situationally disadvantaged.
- Headquarters: 441 Park Avenue, San José, CA 95110
- Coordinates: 37.32822°N 121.89792°W
- Region served: San Jose, California
- Methods: Psychotherapy; Support groups
- Field: Social services, mental health
- Revenue: $371,868 (2020)
- Website: www.actmentalhealth.org

ACT for Mental Health, Inc. is a non-profit human services agency in downtown San Jose, California. ACT is a recipient of Jefferson Awards for Public Service. For more than 50 years ACT has been serving underserved communities with no-cost or low-cost social services without government funding, relying primarily on donations.

== Organization history ==
The organization was founded in 1956. For over 50 years ACT for Mental Health has been relieving obstacles to emotional well-being and by restoring and enhancing strengths through acceptance in a safe, stable and professionally guided environment which provides tools and support for resolution of personal, emotional and situational life problems.

== Focus areas ==
- Mental Health Services
- Behavioral Health
- Drug Rehabilitation
- Homelessness
- English as a second or foreign language
- Wellness Groups
- Support Groups
- Educational Programs and Classes
