= 321 Coffee =

American coffee shop chain

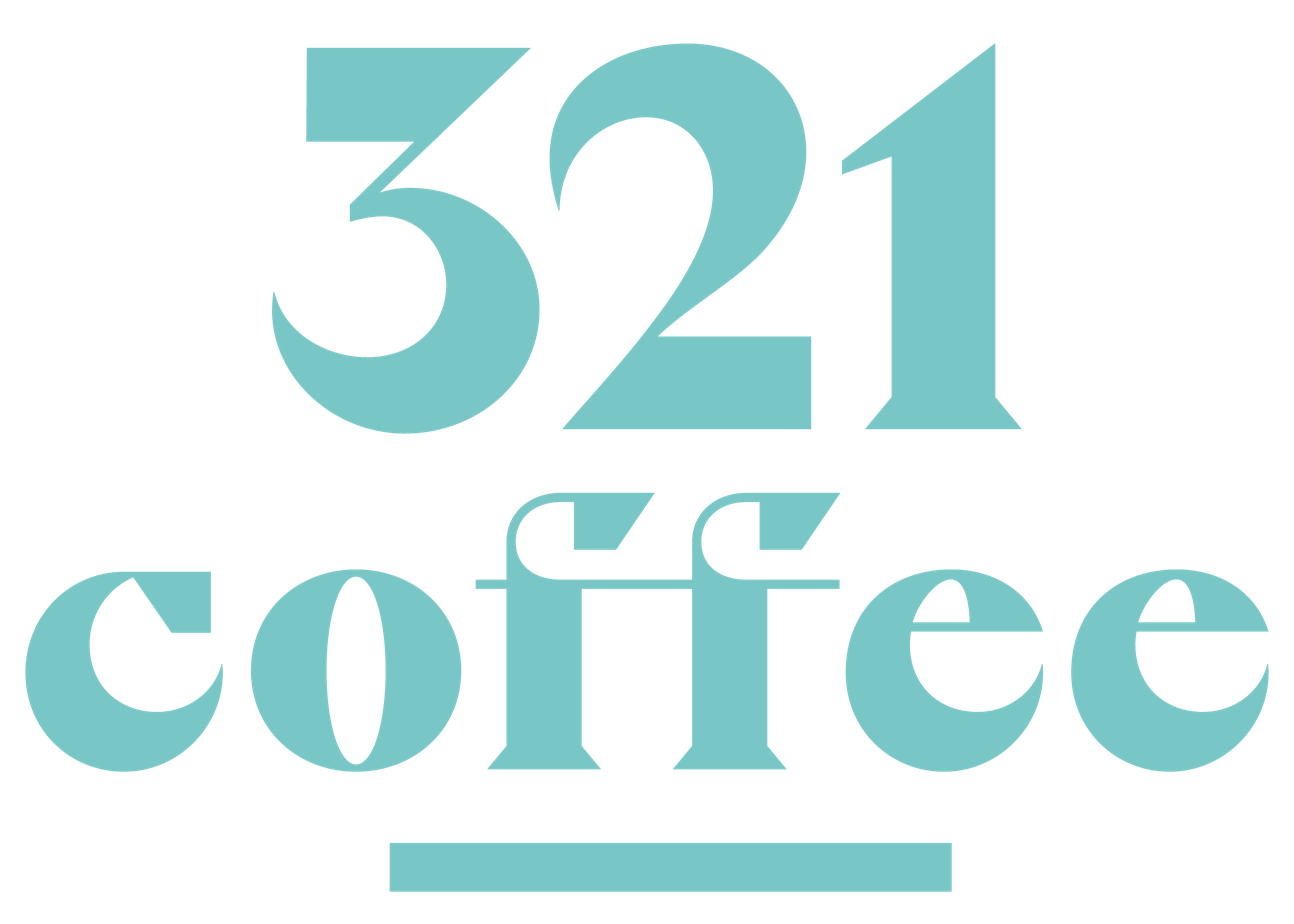
- Company type: Privately held company
- Industry: Retail and wholesale coffee
- Founded: 2017; 9 years ago Raleigh, North Carolina, United States
- Headquarters: Raleigh, North Carolina, US
- Key people: Lindsay Wrege; Michael Evans
- Number of employees: 60+
- Parent: 321 Ventures LLC
- Website: 321coffee.com

321 Coffee is an American coffee roaster and coffeehouse chain that employs adults with intellectual and developmental disabilities (IDD). It was founded in Raleigh, North Carolina, in 2017. As of April 2024, the company operates five retail locations and a roasting facility in the Research Triangle area.

== Overview ==
321 Coffee founders Lindsay Wrege and Michael Evans were freshmen at N.C. State University when they founded 321 Coffee to provide employment opportunities for adults with intellectual and developmental disabilities (IDD). 321 Coffee started out as a college club, in 2017, and ultimately launched as a business in 2021.

The initial concept for 321 Coffee was a pop-up coffee shop at N.C. State events. The first permanent location for 321 Coffee was at the North Carolina State Farmers Market in 2018, and that location doubled its size in 2020. The original location at the State Farmers Market remains active.

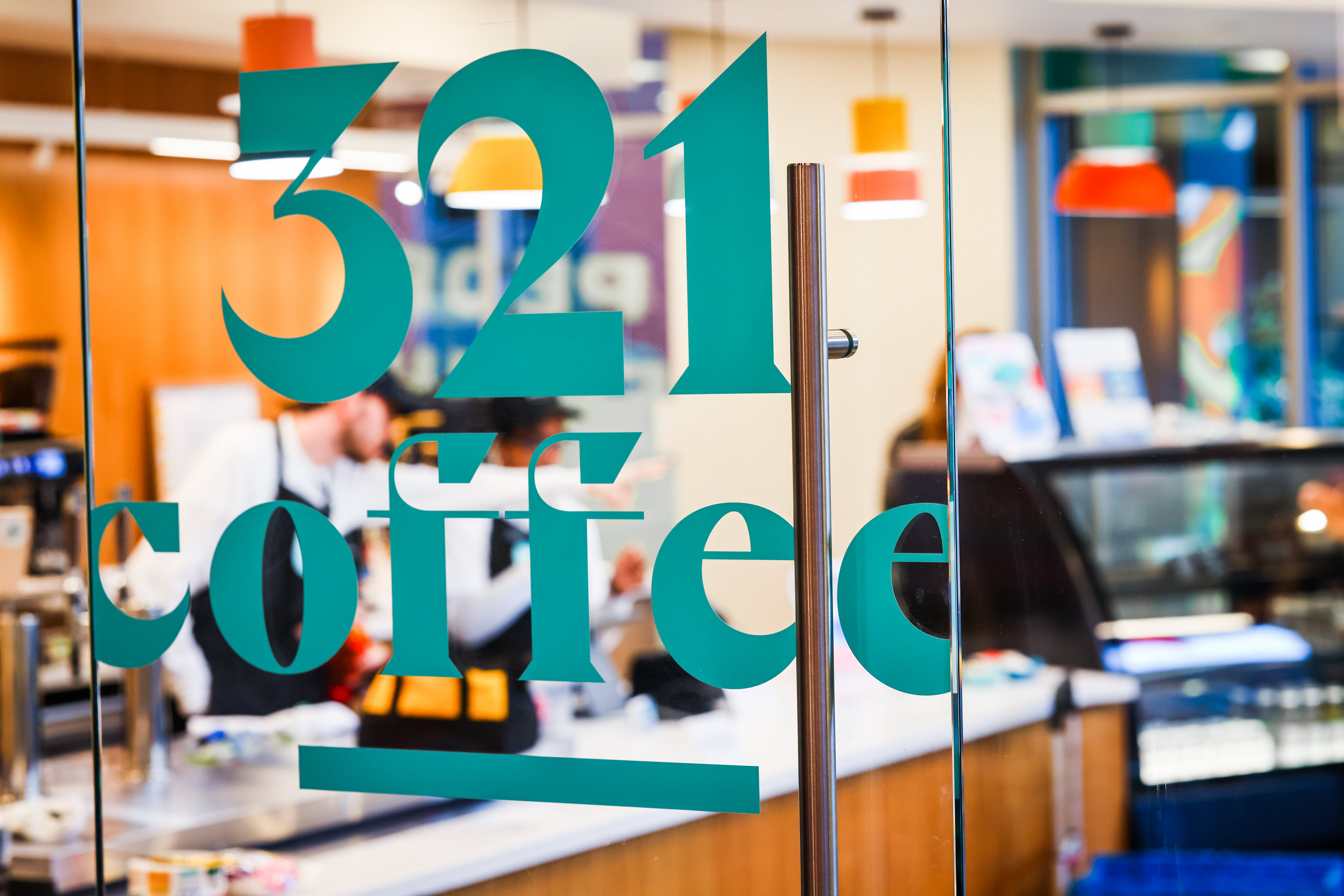
321 Coffee in Downtown Durham

321 Coffee expanded significantly after Wrege and Evans graduated from N.C. State in May 2021 – opening three new locations over a 12-month period. They opened their second location, an in-office café in the headquarters of Pendo in downtown Raleigh, in February 2022. In August 2022, 321 Coffee opened its third shop – and first standalone brick and mortar location – in Downtown Raleigh. In December 2022, they opened their second standalone shop – and fourth overall location – in nearby Durham, North Carolina. Their rapid expansion and mission were highlighted on national broadcast television by The Today Show.

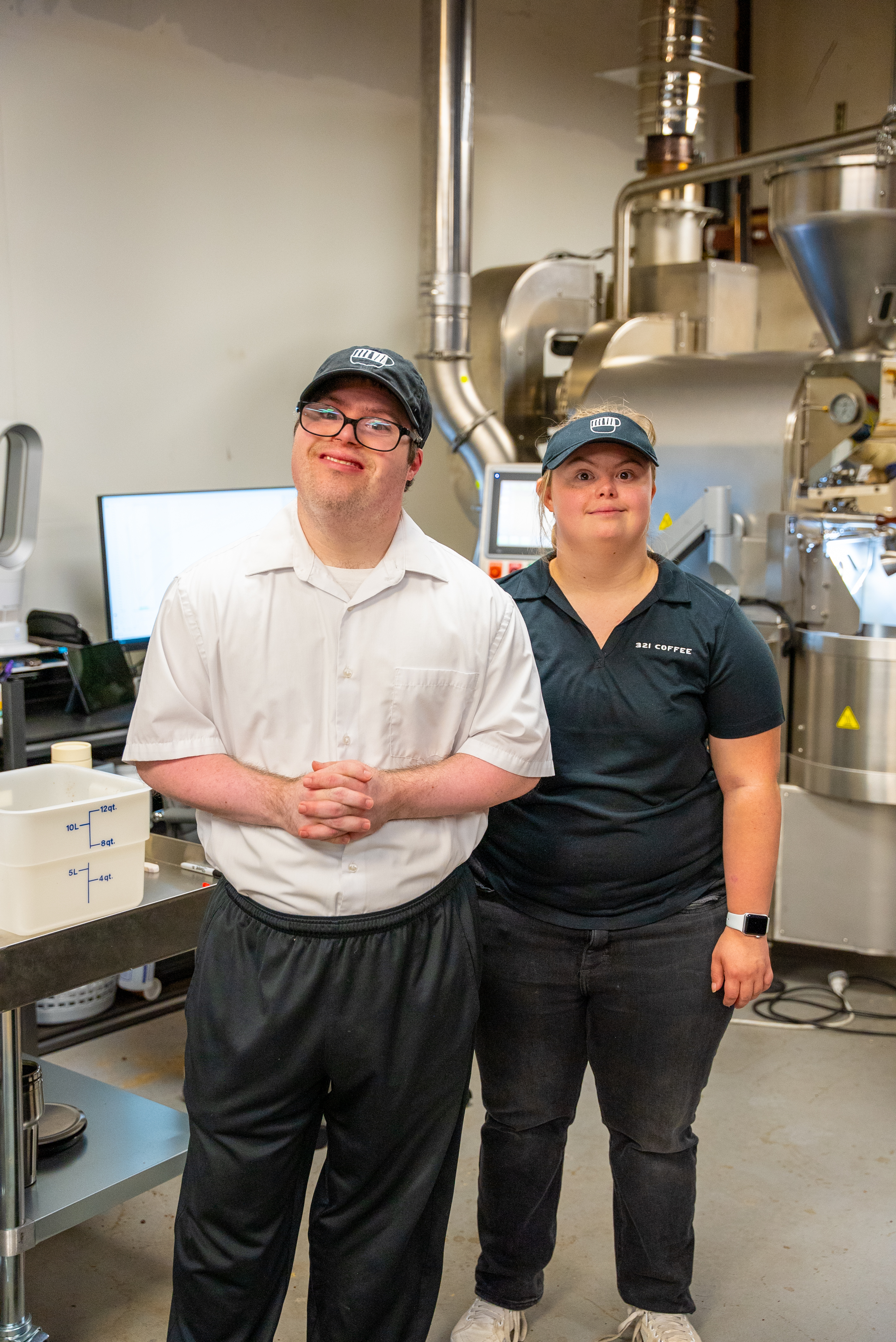
Roasters Paul and Sophie at the 321 Roasting Facility

321 Coffee also opened an inclusive roasting facility in Raleigh to provide coffee for its shops as well as to local restaurants, company break rooms, and regional grocery stores. The roasting facility has a number of accessible features to allow roasters with IDD who have limited dexterity and strength to operate the equipment – including vacuum extractors to lift the beans, batch weighers to measure out correct bean quantities, and continuous band sealers to seal the bags. These features are made possible through partnerships with Lenovo and EngageNC. 321 Coffee's most recent location – another in-office café at the Relias headquarters in Morrisville, North Carolina – opened in January 2024.

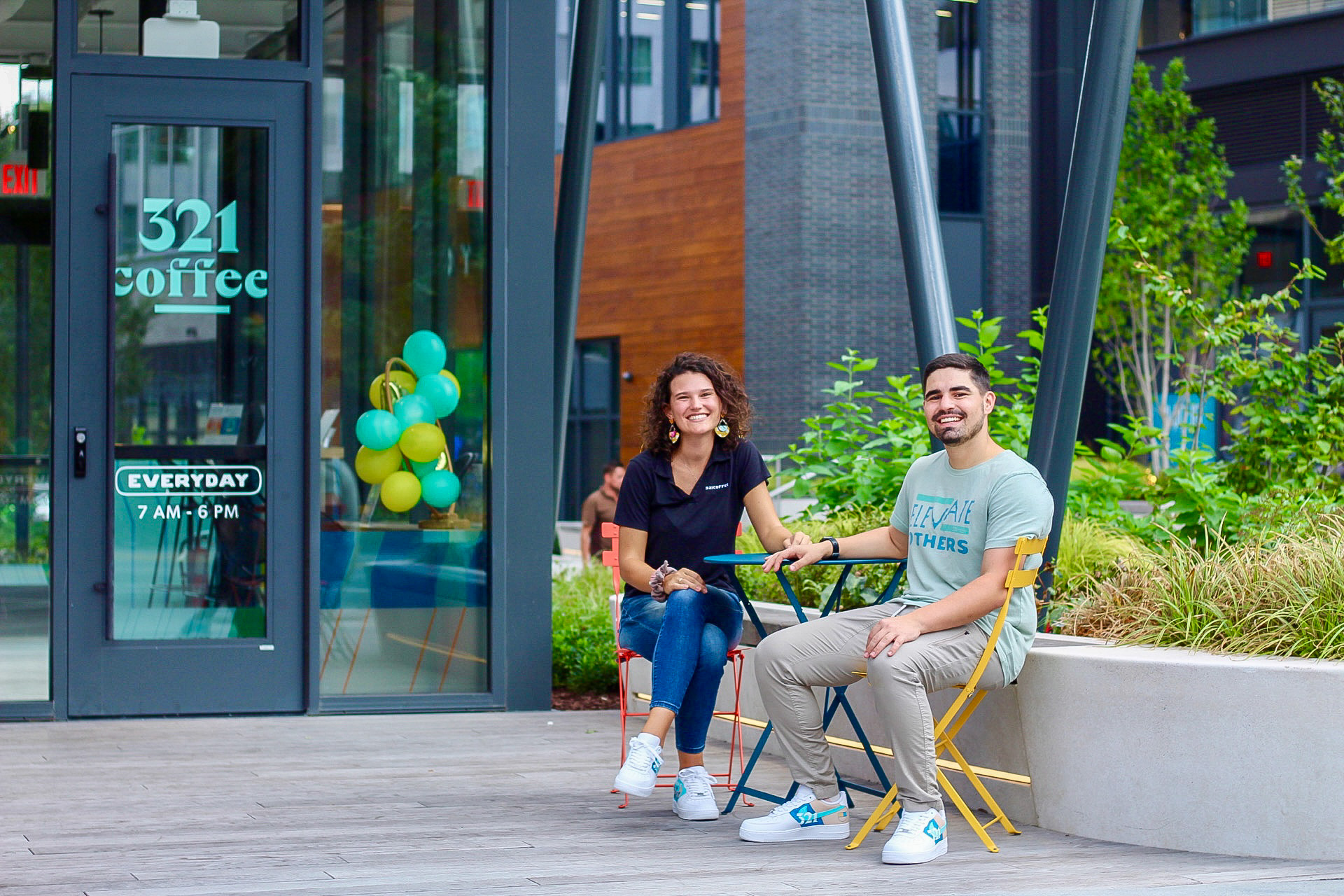
321 Co-Founders Lindsay Wrege and Michael Evans

In early 2024, 321 Coffee announced the launch of a mobile coffee cart to bring its baristas and beverages to offices and corporate events.

Other highlights for 321 Coffee include a partnership with N.C. State University to provide a co-branded coffee called Greater Good, an announced retail location on N.C. State's Centennial Campus, and being named "Best Coffee Shop in the Triangle" in the News & Observer's "2022 Triangle Coffee Bracket".

== Motivation and founding ==
Co-founder and CEO Lindsay Wrege grew up in an environment surrounded by children with IDD. Wrege worked on school projects, participated in dance and sports teams, and went on family outings and vacations with members of the IDD community. Wrege observed that the many activities available to youth in the IDD community dwindled as they approached adulthood; as Wrege began to ponder college and the excitement of the future, she worried about her friends with IDD, having observed firsthand how some of them, despite earning jobs, were only given responsibilities such as cleaning bathrooms or folding laundry. She felt they were capable of doing more.

After Wrege and Michael Evans enrolled at N.C. State as Park Scholars in 2017, they discussed the idea of starting a coffee shop that employed people with disabilities. The pair had been inspired by Bitty & Beau's, a coffee shop with a similar mission in nearby Wilmington, N.C. founded by Amy Wright. Wrege and Evans founded 321 Coffee, and with folding tables and store-bought coffee, they would bring adults with IDD to work serving coffee at events around town. Those pop-up events led to regular appearances on weekends at the North Carolina State Farmers Market – and eventually to their first permanent location in the Market Shoppes building at that same venue.

== Mission ==
The mission of 321 Coffee is to provide meaningful employment opportunities for adults with disabilities. According to the Bureau of Labor Statistics, only about 20% of adults with disabilities participate in the labor force.

== Branding ==
The name 321 Coffee is a nod towards Down syndrome, which is caused by a 3rd copy of chromosome 21. 321 Coffee also employs people with a large range of intellectual and development disabilities, such as autism, spina bifida, cerebral palsy, and DiGeorge syndrome.

== Locations ==
321 Coffee has five locations throughout the Research Triangle.
