= Bernard Powell =

American civil rights activist (1947–1979)

Bernard Powell (March 5, 1947 – 1979) was a Black Civil Rights Activist in Kansas City, Missouri. He joined the NAACP at the age of 13 and later founded the Social Action Committee of 20 (SAC-20). Powell was recognized with many honors, such as National Junior Chamber of Commerce's "Outstanding Man of the Year," the Jefferson Award for Public Service's Samuel S. Beard Award for Outstanding Public Service by an Individual 35 & Under in 1978, and has a dedicated park and memorial fountain in Kansas City. The Greater Kansas City Chamber of Commerce honors an individual every year with an award with his namesake.

He served on the Governor's Advisory Council on Comprehensive Health Planning for Missouri and the Human Resources Corp, among other state committee appointments. He marched with Martin Luther King during the march at Selma in 1965 and then became the director of the Congress of Racial Equity.

Powell was shot to death in the East Side Social Club 8 August 1979, at the age of 32.
