= Nelly Cheboi =

2022 CNN Hero winner

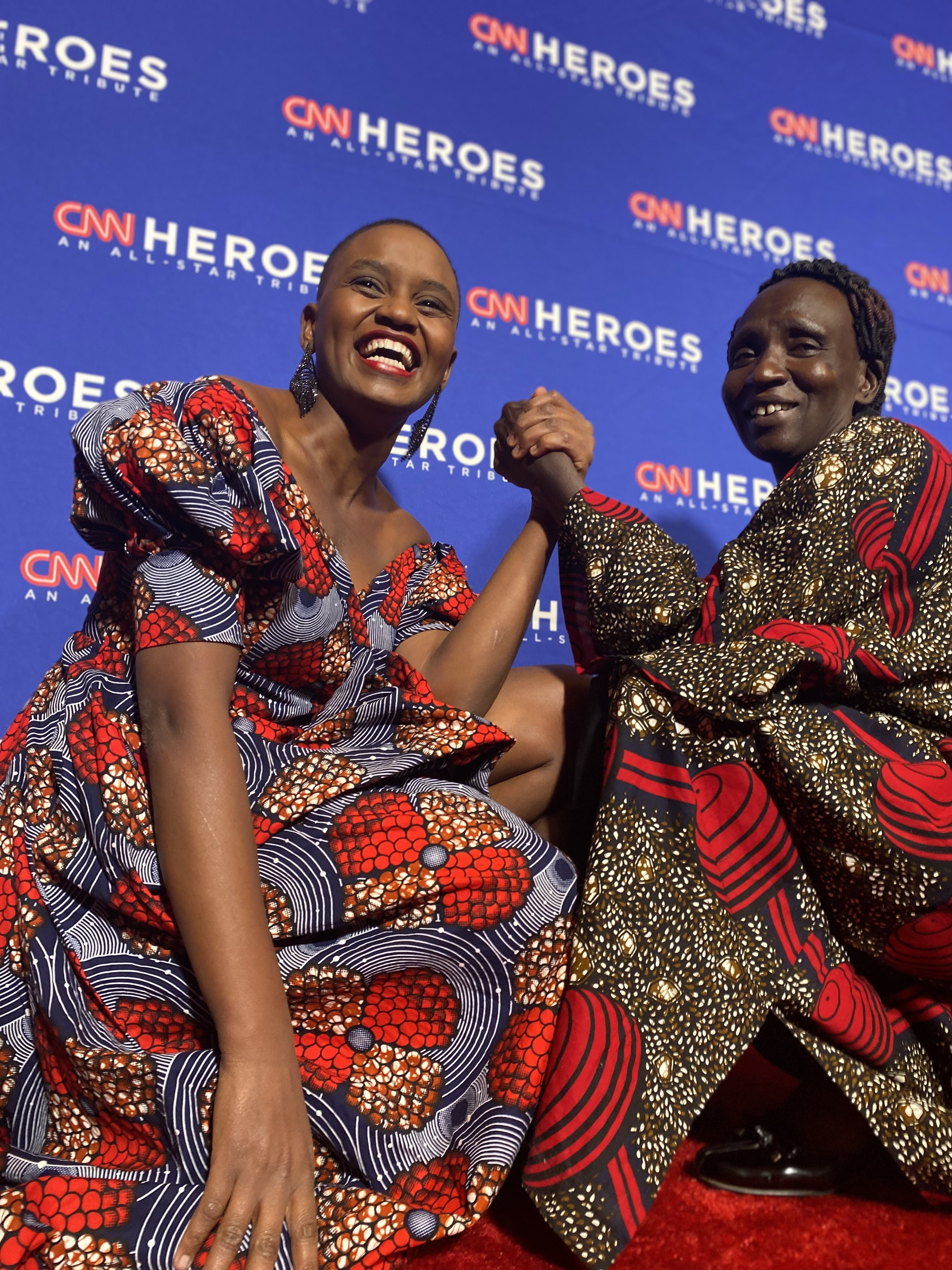
- Nelly Cheboi with her Mom Christina Cheboi at CNN Heroes 2022 All Star Tribute
- Born: November 26, 1992 (age 33); Mogotio, Kenya
- Other name: Kosi
- Education: Augustana College (Illinois)
- Occupations: Founder and CEO of TechLit Africa
- Known for: Winning CNN Hero of The Year 2022
- Spouse: Tyler Cinnamon (m. 2017)
- Awards: CNN Hero of Year, Forbes 30 under 30
- Website: techlitafrica.org

Nelly Cheboi is the founder of TechLit Africa, an organization that teaches digital skills in rural primary schools, and the winner of the 2022 CNN Hero award.

== Early life ==
Cheboi grew up in poverty in the rural village of Mogotio in Kenya. She received a full scholarship to study computer science at Augustana College in Illinois in 2012. She graduated in 2016 with a bachelor’s degree in applied mathematics and computer science.

== Career ==
Cheboi built a school in Kenya, called Zawadi Yetu, during her junior year of college In 2018, she started to transport donated computers from the United States to Kenya. In 2019, she founded the nonprofit TechLit Africa with another software engineer, Tyler Cinnamon, after quitting their jobs. The organization, headquartered in Kenya at Zawadi Yetu, teaches 4000 students aged 5–14 basic computer skills and redistributes recycled technology to enable the creation of computer labs in African schools. As of 2022, they have built 10 computer labs in rural Kenya and have plans for 100 more.

== Recognition ==
In 2022, Cheboi was named as one of the 30 under 30 on the Forbes list for social impact. In the same year, she was also the recipient of the CNN Hero award.
