= Najah Bazzy =

American humanitarian and interfaith leader

- Born: Dearborn, Michigan, United States
- Education: Madonna University (Bachelor of Science in Nursing)
- Occupations: CEO, nurse
- Known for: Founder and CEO of Zaman International

Najah Bazzy is an American humanitarian, interfaith leader, nurse, and founder and CEO of Zaman International, a nonprofit organization dedicated to fighting poverty and its causes.

== Early life and education ==
Bazzy was born in Dearborn, Michigan. Both her father and grandfather worked at the Ford factory located in Dearborn (the Ford River Rouge complex); her grandfather was one of the first workers employed at the factory. She earned her nursing degree from Madonna University.

== Career ==
Bazzy has worked as a critical care nurse and as a transcultural nurse.

Bazzy served as an adjunct professor for the Institute of International Health at Michigan State University. In 1997, she co-founded the Young Muslim Association.

In 1996, in her role as a transcultural nurse, Bazzy was caring the baby of an Iraqi refugee family at Beaumont Hospital. She arranged for home hospice care, and was struck by the condition of poverty the family lived in. This motivated her to focus on poverty alleviation, and her efforts led to her founding Zaman International in 2004, a nonprofit organization dedicated to fighting poverty and its causes. Zaman is run by volunteers and estimates having helped over 3 million people across 20 countries. In addition to providing food and clothes to families in need, Zaman International has grown to provide vocational education, an infant burial program, and international humanitarian relief.

In 2022, Bazzy was appointed to the Michigan Humanities Council board by Michigan governor Gretchen Whitmer.

=== COVID-19 ===
In response to the COVID-19 pandemic, Bazzy leveraged Zaman's resources to provide pandemic-specific relief. The organization helped with food distribution and started offering virtual support to the vocational program. Bazzy also worked with the board for the Governor of Michigan on Michigan's COVID-19 vaccination plan.

== Awards and honors ==
- In 2019, Bazzy was recognized as a CNN Hero for founding Zaman International
- In 2020, Bazzy was awarded an honorary Ph.D. in Humanities from the Oakland University School of Medicine
- In 2020, Bazzy's smile was featured on the packaging for Lay's brand potato chips, a campaign focused on raising awareness of charity leaders and their organizations
- In 2021, Bazzy was included on the list of Crain's Detroit Business 100 Most Influential Women
- In 2022, Bazzy was named Michiganian of the Year by The Detroit News
- In 2022, Bazzy was inducted into the Michigan Women's Hall of Fame for her efforts on combating poverty
- In 2023, Bazzy was named as one of USA Today's Women of the Year, which recognizes women who have made a significant impact across the country
