= Yohannes Gebregeorgis =

Ethiopian businessman

Yohannes Gebregeorgis is an Ethiopian businessman and the founder of Ethiopia Reads, a philanthropic organization committed to bringing literacy to the children of Ethiopia. In 2008, he was recognized as one of the "Top 10 Heroes of the Year" by CNN. In 2011 he was awarded American Library Association Honorary Membership.

== Early life ==
Gebregeorgis grew up in the town of Negele Borana, about 12 hours from Ethiopia’s capital, Addis Ababa. His mother could not read, and his father could only decipher a few words, but he was committed to providing his son with an education. At age 19, he picked up his first book outside of school. ‘“Books saved my life,’ Yohannes says”. From this point on, Gegregeorgis sought to read what he could get his hands on.

== Education and professional life ==
In the late 1970s and early 1980s, Yohannes Gebregeorgis was politically active and joined the resistance against the ruling military dictatorship of Ethiopia, the Derg. He sought political asylum in the United States and emigrated there in 1982. Once in the States, Gebregeorgis pursued his B.A. and eventually got his Masters of Library Science at the University of Texas. He was then offered a job as the children’s librarian at the San Francisco Public Library. There he was responsible to collect foreign language books for the children’s collection, and he soon discovered, “The library had books in more than 75 languages, but I could find none in Amharic”. This spurred him on to find books written in Ethiopia’s predominant language. When he found none, he took it upon himself to write the book Silly Mammo, a traditional Ethiopian folktale, in an Amharic and English translation. He also connected with Jane Kurtz, a children’s author, who had lived much of her childhood in Ethiopia, and she helped him publish Silly Mammo. They used the proceeds from the book to begin raising money for a literacy campaign to get books into the hands of Ethiopian children.

== Ethiopia Reads ==
In 1998, Ethiopia Reads, the program dedicated to fostering literacy in Ethiopia, was born. In 2002, Gebregeorgis quit his job at the San Francisco Public Library and moved back to Addis Ababa, Ethiopia with 15,000 books and ready to open his first free library for children. On April 5, 2003, the Shola Children’s Library opened for the children of Ethiopia. Since then, the organization helped open 10 free school libraries. The organization also sponsors the Mobile Donkey Libraries program, designed to bring books to children in rural parts of the country where they cannot access one of the many other libraries Ethiopia Reads sponsors. Ethiopia Reads also publishes books in Amharic for young Ethiopian readers.

== Selected publications ==
In addition to his book, Silly Mammo, Gebregeorgis also wrote many reviews for School Library Journal during his time at San Francisco Public Library. A sampling is listed below.

- Gebregeorgis, Yohannes. "Junior High Up: Nonfiction." School Library Journal 42.7 (1996): 104.
- Gebregeorgis, Yohannes. "Grades 5 & Up: Nonfiction." School Library Journal 43.7 (1997): 100.
- Gebregeorgis, Yohannes. "Preschool to Grade 4: Fiction." School Library Journal 44.8 (1998): 140.

== Death ==
Gebregeorgis died on January 18, 2022 after a brief ilness.
