= Robin Lim =

Filipino-American midwife in Indonesia

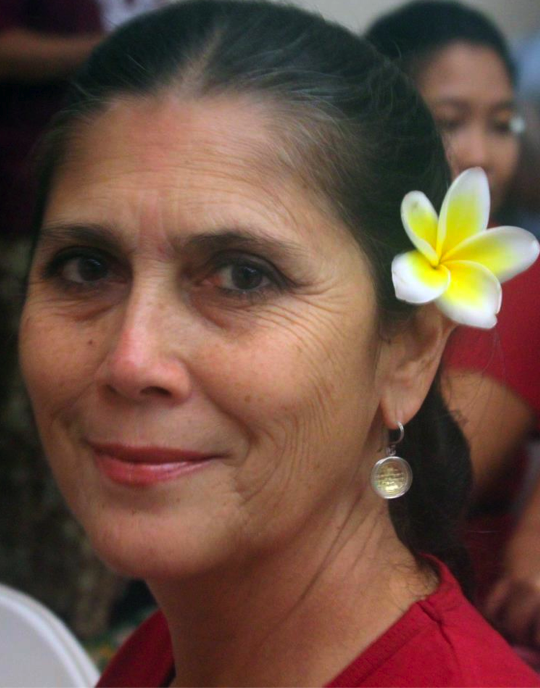
- Born: Robin Lim
- Occupation: Midwife
- Employer: founder of Yayasan Bumi Sehat (Healthy Mother Earth Foundation) Indonesia
- Known for: 'Mother Robin' 2011 CNN Hero of the Year
- Spouse: William Hemmerle
- Children: 8 children
- Website: Bumi Sehat Foundation International website

Robin Lim ("Mother Robin," or "Ibu Robin") is a midwife and founder of Yayasan Bumi Sehat (Healthy Mother Earth Foundation) health clinics, which offer free prenatal care, birthing services, and medical aid to anyone who needs it. She and her team have been working since 2003 to combat Indonesia's high maternal and infant mortality rates, and the Bumi Sehat birth centers serve many at-risk mothers. She was awarded the 2011 CNN Hero of the Year award by the CNN news network for helping thousands of low-income women in Indonesia with healthy pregnancy and birth services.

== Bumi Sehat ==
In 2012, the Bumi Sehat Foundation provided 50,050 recorded incidences of patient care, educational and human services. From its beginnings as a community health and childbirth clinic in Bali, Lim took the Bumi Sehat Foundation to Aceh following the 2004 Indian Ocean earthquake and tsunami. Combined, the two clinics have facilitated the birth of more than 5,000 babies. When earthquakes struck, Lim took the project to Yogyakarta in 2006, Padang in 2008, and Haiti in 2010.

Lim and the Bumi Sehat midwives are prepared to provide maternal and infant care in the middle of devastated areas with limited materials. Instead of cutting the umbilical cord, for instance, she burns it—especially in disaster zones, because it's something she can teach midwives and doctors who have lost their instruments. Using scissors to sever the umbilical cord carries a risk of tetanus, while burning the cord mitigates the risk of infection. In addition to knowing how to safely respond medically, Robin Lim and the Bumi Sehat Foundation don't follow any particular religion, and honor all requests and faith traditions, aiming to help mothers feel safe and supported.

Lim is an advocate for parental rights. Babies are often held by hospitals in Indonesia, until payment is made for birthing services. Parents, sometimes in desperation, relinquish their rights and place their babies up for adoption. Lim's Yayasan Bumi Sehat birthing sanctuaries offer free prenatal care, birthing services, and medical aid to anyone who needs it in Indonesia, where the average family earns the equivalent of $8 a day, and a normal hospital delivery without complications costs around $150. A Caesarean section can cost more than $1,000. Indonesia's high maternal and infant mortality rates are caused in part by these costs, which many women cannot meet. In turn, their lives and the lives of their babies are at risk. While some Indonesian celebrities and expatriates choose Bumi Sehat to birth their children and they often give donations, 80% of the families served by the clinics can barely pay anything and are helped for free.

== Personal life ==
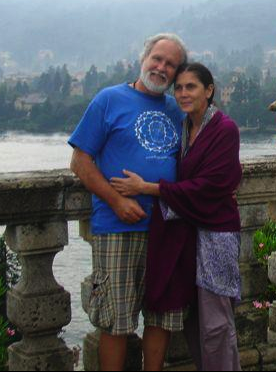
William Hemmerle and Robin Lim

Lim is a U.S. citizen with deep roots in the Philippines, the homeland of her mother. Lim is a mother of eight children of her own, and an author of many books related to infant and maternal health. She became a midwife after several personal tragedies, including the death of her sister (and her baby) from complications during pregnancy, and the loss of her best friend and one of the midwives who delivered one of her own children.

Lim was raised in the USA and the Philippines while her father was stationed in Vietnam with the U.S. military. She studied at Santa Barbara City College. Lim and her husband, William Hemmerle, sold their home in Hawaii and moved the family to Bali. Once in Bali, Lim volunteered to help local women birth their babies in various homes. As the demand for her services grew, she decided to obtain formal midwife certification. Lim is a Certified Professional Midwife with the North American Registry of Midwives. In 2003, with help from the Balinese community and donations from friends across the globe, Lim and fellow midwife Brenda Ritchmond, as well as board members; Eka Yuliani, Made Wena, and Made Sandiyasa opened the first Yayasan Bumi Sehat clinic.
