= Freweini Mebrahtu =

Ethiopian chemical engineer and inventor

- ፍሬወይኒ መብራህቱ
- Born: Freweini Mebrahtu; Ethiopia
- Awards: 2019 CNN Hero of the year

Freweini Mebrahtu (Ge'ez: ፍሬወይኒ መብራህቱ, romanized: Frēweyinī Mebrahtu) is an Ethiopian chemical engineer and inventor who won the 2019 CNN Hero of the year award for her activism in improving girls' access to education.

== Early life ==
Freweini Mebrahtu was born and raised in the rural Tigray region of Ethiopia in 1965. While neither of her parents received a formal education, her father believed strongly in the importance of educating his children—including his daughters. With his support, she left her home country in 1988 to attend Prairie View A&M University where she studied chemical engineering. She graduated in 1992 with her Bachelor of Science in Chemical Engineering. Having promised her father to come home after receiving her degree, she started to visit Ethiopia once the Dergue, communist regime, fell.

== Contribution ==
Mebrahtu has dedicated her career to keeping Ethiopian girls in school and ending the stigma surrounding menstruation—both through educational campaigns and her invention of a reusable menstrual pad. During her trips back to her home country, she began researching whether there had been any developments in female menstrual education or product availability. "The stories I heard were shocking – digging a hole and squatting over it for three to five days, or wrapping themselves with strips of cloth. I also noticed that they were uncomfortable talking about it – this is still a taboo subject."

In Ethiopia, one in four girls report missing one or more school days during menstruation. In rural parts of the country, nearly half of female youth miss school for reasons related to their periods. "What's most damaging of all", Mabrahtu says, "is that they can be hounded out of schools, too embarrassed to return. And if they don't go back, their chance of a better future is gone forever". Mebrahtu's motivation for addressing this problem came from personal experience; "My story begins with my first period…living in Ethiopia, I had been taught nothing about my body. I thought I was ill but I was told not to talk about it. That was over 30 years ago and nothing has changed." After she moved to the United States for college, she was shocked by the abundance of sanitary products available for women. She could not believe the contrast to her home country where girls used scraps of clothing or simply wouldn't leave their homes in order to conceal their periods. In 2005, Mebrahtu created a reusable sanitary pad women and girls could wash between uses. It was both affordable and environmentally friendly. She was granted a patent in 2006 by Ethiopia's Science and Technology Ministry. For a while it was difficult to secure funding, as many male-dominated banks in Ethiopia were hesitant to put their faith in the sanitary pad business. In 2009, however, she successfully secured a loan for $150,000 from the Ethiopian Development Bank. She used this money to found Mariam Seba Sanitary Products Factory, named after her daughter. The factory opened in 2009. "It was one of the happiest days of my life. We set about producing individual dignity packs containing 4 reusable pads and 2 pairs of underwear – costing just £4 a pack". Mebrahtu employed 42 local women and, in collaboration with her team, began producing 600,000 sanitary pads and 300,000 underwear per year, selling more than 80% of the pads to non-governmental organizations that freely distributed them. In 2014, she collaborated with Dignity Period, a local organization that visited schools across Tigray to educate both girls and boys about menstruation. "Together we scaled up production and provided every girl with a free pack so they could continue their education without fear and with dignity." Data gathered by Dignity Period showed that schools they visited saw a 24% increase in attendance among girls. By 2019 Mebrahtu and Dignity Period had reached over 120,000 girls, determined to expand into neighboring, more remote regions that can only be reached by foot.

== Recognition ==
In 2019, Freweini Mebrahtu was named CNN's Hero of the Year for her work to help women and girls in developing countries who face hardships from the cultural stigma around periods. The award comes with $100,000 that Mebrahtu is able to use to expand her work.
