= Guadalupe Arizpe de la Vega =

Guadalupe Arizpe De La Vega
- Occupation: Humanitarian
- Known for: Founded the Federación Mexicana de Asociaciones y Empresas Privadas

Guadalupe Arizpe De La Vega is a Mexican humanitarian who founded the Federación Mexicana de Asociaciones y Empresas Privadas (FEMAP), which supports a network of clinics, hospitals, and nursing schools in the North of Mexico, based in Ciudad Juárez. She is a proponent of women's right to access birth control and health care. De La Vega and her late husband, border billionaire, Federico De La Vega, are greatly revered for their impact on the region through their philanthropic efforts focused on propelling education, healthcare, and sports.

== Biography ==
De la Vega had been volunteering for the Red Cross since she was eight. In the 1960s, she raised money for the Mexican Red Cross. De la Vega began working with women on family planning after reading about a poor mother of nine who, when pregnant again, "tried to kill her fetus by stabbing herself in the stomach." De la Vega visited her in prison and was shocked to find out that this woman did not know anything about family planning or birth control. She helped her obtain legal counsel and she began educating other women in Mexico. In 1973, she began working with women in Juárez, and helped them gain access to family planning and a maternity clinic. De la Vega became a member of the El Paso Planned Parenthood Board.

De la Vega founded Federación Mexicana de Asociaciones y Empresas Privadas (FEMAP or Federation of Private Family Planning Associations) and worked as the director of the network of health clinics in Mexico. These clinics increased the number of Mexican women using birth control from 50,000 women in 1982 to 360,000 women using birth control methods in 1987.

De la Vega was named a CNN Hero in 2010. When Juárez became the "murder capital of the world" during the Mexican drug wars, De la Vega continued visiting her hospital in the city several times a week. She and her family had recently moved to El Paso because her family was threatened. Vega was awarded the Woodrow Wilson Award in 2013 from the Woodrow Wilson International Center for Scholars.
