= Sri Nihal Tammana =

Indian-American environmental campaigner

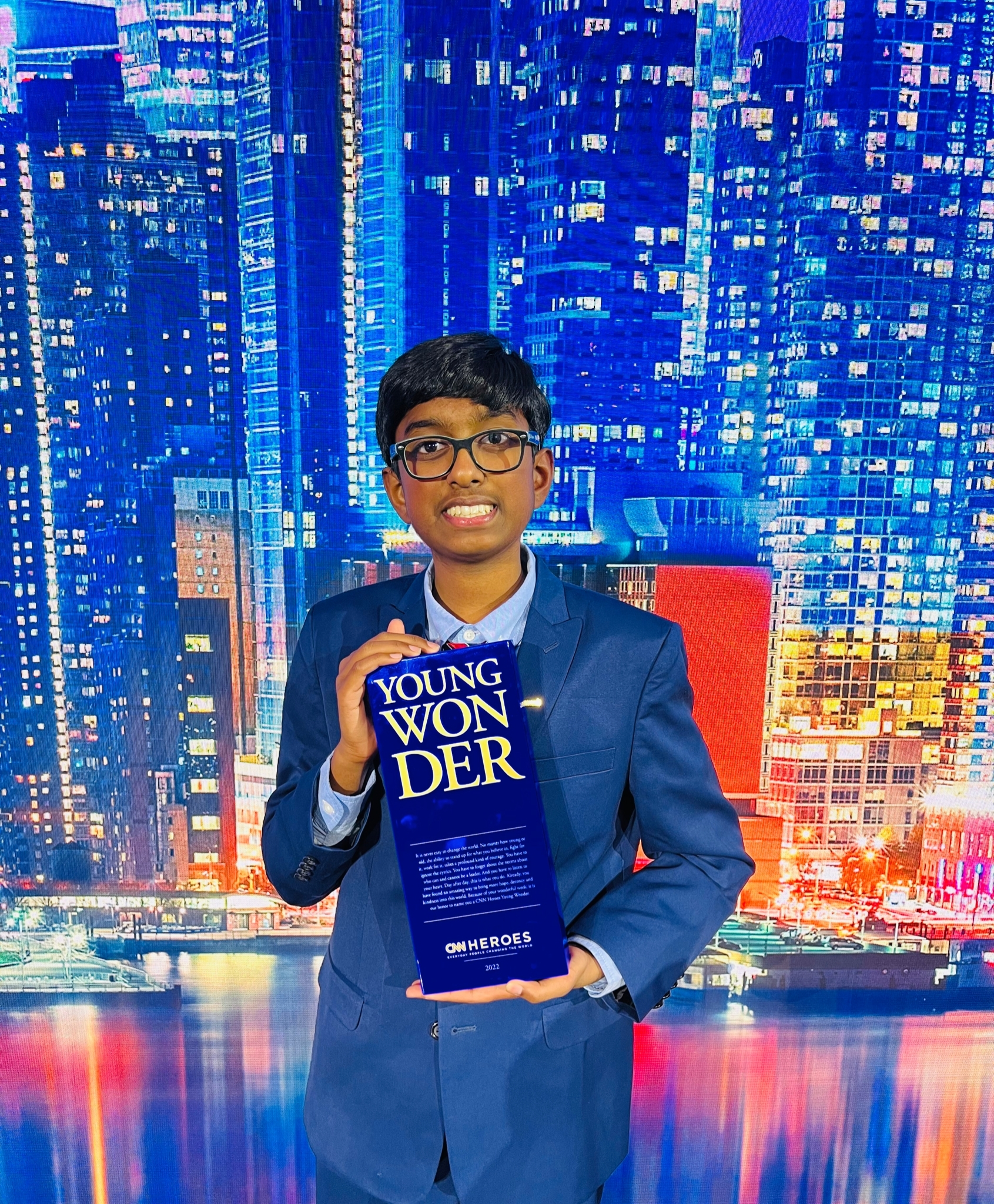
- Sri Nihal Tammana at the CNN Heroes 2022 award ceremony
- Born: 2009 (age 16–17)
- Occupation: Environmental campaigner
- Years active: 2019–present
- Known for: Founder of Recycle My Battery
- Website: https://recyclemybattery.org

Sri Nihal Tammana is an environmental campaigner who specializes in battery recycling.

== Environmental work ==
In 2019, Tammana founded the US-based non-profit organization Recycle My Battery. They install free battery recycling bins and educate students and adults about battery recycling. As of July 2025, the organization has recycled nearly 900,000 used batteries, educated over 85 million people about battery recycling, and has a team of over 1,000 youth volunteers across several countries. In 2025, Recycle My Battery launched the Battery Challenge, a school competition that helped students recycle over 300,000 batteries in just a few months.

Tammana has been featured in a lesson in a German textbook published by Westermann. He has made a number of media appearances, including a live appearance on CNN, a featured segment on the Japanese TV network Fuji TV, and a documentary appearance on BBC. He has delivered two TED talks, one in 2021 titled "Saving Earth, One Battery At A Time!", and a second in 2023 titled "Recycle My Battery: Empowering Communities". In 2023, Tammana was featured in the Time for Kids magazine as one of the "Kid Heroes of the Planet".

On October 7, 2023, Recycle My Battery broke a Guinness World Record for the Longest Line of Batteries by placing 31,204 batteries in a line. The previous record stood at 1,380 batteries.

== Awards ==
- 2020: National Waste & Recycling Association, National Recycling Award
- 2020: President's Environmental Youth Award
- 2020: New Jersey Governor's Environmental Excellence Award
- 2022: CNN Heroes, Young Wonder Award
- 2022: Gloria Barron Prize, Young Heroes
- 2023: Top 3 finalist for the International Children's Peace Prize
- 2023: Honoree NJ Governor’s Volunteerism Awards
- 2023: Diana Award
- 2023: Youth Summit Awards
