= Sal Dimiceli =

American businessman

Sal Dimiceli is a real estate businessman from Lake Geneva, Wisconsin who writes a column on charity for the Lake Geneva Regional News. Dimiceli's column, "The Time is Now to Help," has been likened to "a 'Dear Abby' for the down and out", but is perhaps more akin to the Percy Ross column, Thanks a Million. The column features letters from people in economic distress; Dimiceli selects families to visit, stocks their refrigerator, pays off their outstanding utility bills, and then provides the family with some financial counseling to help them avoid such difficulties in the future.

Dimiceli's work has been featured in national media, and he was named a "CNN Hero".
