= Maria Keller =

Literacy nonprofit founder

- Born: May 2000 (age 24); Minnesota, United States
- Education: University of Notre Dame
- Occupation: Student
- Known for: Founding Read Indeed
- Mother: Maura Keller
- Honours: Jefferson Award for Public Service, Prudential Spirit of Community Award, CNN Heroes Young Wonder

Maria Keller (born May 2000) is an American woman who is the founder and executive director of Read Indeed, a nonprofit literacy organization that donates books to children who lack access to reading materials. Keller founded the charitable organization in 2009 to donate one million books to in-need children by the time she turned eighteen, a task she accomplished at age thirteen. By 2024, Read Indeed has donated nearly four million books to underprivileged youth in each U.S. State and seventeen countries. For her work with Read Indeed, Keller received the Jefferson Award for Public Service and the Prudential Spirit of Community Award, as well as recognition from CNN Heroes.

Keller is from Plymouth, Minnesota and attends a Catholic parish in Hamel, Minnesota. Keller attended the University of Notre Dame, where she is pursued an undergraduate degree in Medieval Studies and the Program of Liberal Studies. She attended public school throughout her childhood and is a graduate of Orono High School.

== Early life and education ==
Keller was raised in Plymouth, Minnesota, and attended public schools in the Orono School District. She attended Orono High School, where she played lacrosse. She was named an AP Scholar in 2016.

=== College years ===
Keller enrolled at the University of Notre Dame in the summer of 2018. She is a major in the Program of Liberal Studies—a great books program—as well as Medieval Studies.

In the summer of 2021, Keller traveled to London and Oxford in order to conduct research on the relationship between themes present in Evelyn Waugh's Brideshead Revisited and the aesthetics of English Catholicism during the 1800s. The research forms the basis of her senior thesis.

== Philanthropy ==
=== Read Indeed ===
In 2009, when Keller was eight years old, she started to collect and distribute books to low-income children. She was inspired to do so after becoming deeply upset when told by her mother that not every child in the world had access to books. She first organized a single book drive which collected thousands of books for a Minneapolis children's shelter. After the book drive, the nine year-old Keller told her parents that she would collect and distribute one million books by the time she turned eighteen.

Shortly thereafter, Keller founded Read Indeed with the goal of collecting and distributing one million books to those in need by the time she became an adult. In the first year her organization, which was based in her family's garage, collected and donated 70,000 books to low-income children. The organization expanded with volunteers and a warehouse. By the time Keller was eleven, Read Indeed had collected 500,000 books. The nonprofit donated its millionth book in October 2013, when Keller was thirteen.

The 250 volunteer-strong nonprofit's reach has been international in scope, though 80% of books distributed by the nonprofit have been given to children in Minnesota. By 2014, the organization had distributed books to children in thirty U.S. states and thirteen countries. This reach of the charity's work expanded to 48 states by March 2016 and all fifty U.S. states and seventeen countries by 2019. As of 2019, Read Indeed had collected and distributed more than three million books to underprivileged youth.

Following her matriculation to the University of Notre Dame, Keller resigned as CEO of Read Indeed in order to allow her younger brother, Ryan, to serve in that role. As of 2024, Keller is now the executive director of Read Indeed.

== Awards and honors ==
In 2012, Keller won a 2012 Eleven Who Care award, a volunteer recognition award given to Minnesotans by KARE-TV.

In 2014, Keller was one of two students to receive a Jefferson Award for Public Service in 2014 in the category of Outstanding National or Global Service by a Young American 25 Years or Under. That same year, Keller was one of three children recognized as a CNN Heroes Young Wonder for her work; 2014 also saw Keller become the inaugural winner of the Brielle, New Jersey–based Charles Lafitte Foundation's "Junior Changemaker" award.

In September 2015, Keller was selected as an honoree for the Gloria Barron Prize for Young Heroes.

In 2016, Keller was recognized as a recipient of the Prudential Spirit of Community Award.

== Personal life ==
Keller is a Roman Catholic. She has an affinity for Memento Mori, describing it as a key part of her spiritual life. She is a member of Saint Anne's Parish in Hamel, Minnesota.

Keller's mother, Maura, is an editor and freelance writer. According to the Star Tribune, Keller's father works in the field of design.
