= Adoption of Ala'a Eddeen =

Adoption of a disabled Iraqi boy by an American soldier

The Adoption of Ala'a Eddeen is an adoption of a then 9-year-old Iraqi boy, who could not walk because he had cerebral palsy, by American Capt. Scott Southworth while he was deployed during the Iraq War.

This case became a beginning of the growing campaign for bringing more disabled and orphaned Iraqi children to the United States.

In 2007, CNN profiled Scott and Ala'a's story in its Heroes: An All-Star Tribute. The story was chosen as one of 6 finalists.

== Scott Southworth ==
Before his deployment to Iraq Scott Southworth did not own a home, was unmarried, worked long hours, and "squeezed in his service as a national guardsman". Southworth's family considered it to be an honor to serve in the military; his great-great-great-grandfather, his grandfather and his father also served. An evangelical Christian, Southworth finished law school, and planned to run for district attorney's office after coming home from Iraq.

== Meeting and adoption ==
Scott Southworth was deployed to Iraq in 2003. His deployment was to last 13 months. On September 6, 2003, halfway through his deployment, Southworth and his unit visited an orphanage in Baghdad named for Mother Teresa. There were 20 children in the orphanage, all with physical disabilities. A few nuns cared for the children and also taught them to speak some English.

During their visit to the orphanage the soldiers played with the children. They wanted both to cheer up the children and to distract themselves from the war; twenty soldiers of the unit were wounded, and one was killed. Southworth first met Ala'a during this visit. The boy, who had lived in the orphanage since he was four years old, could not walk. The soldiers made subsequent trips to the orphanage, and attachment between Southworth and Ala'a grew. Southworth began to view Ala'a as a younger brother; Ala'a began to refer to Southworth as "Baba" ("Daddy" in Arabic). When Southworth was informed by orphanage staff that within a year Ala'a would be transferred to a less hospitable institution, he began adoption proceedings.

Iraqi law prohibits the adoption of Iraqi children by foreigners, but after returning home, Southworth was able to secure a humanitarian visa for Ala'a. By that time, Southworth was elected district attorney, and his income became steady. The two began living together in January 2005. Ala'a's health improved significantly, and he began attending school.

== In media ==
In 2007, CNN profiled Southworth and Ala'a's story in its Heroes: An All-Star Tribute. The story was chosen as one of 18 finalists. The money collected from the show was used to pay medical and legal bills for Ala'a. The pair were the focus of a variety of media, including an article in the VFW Magazine, a full episode on PBS, and a presentation at St. Norbert College.

== Aftermath ==
In 2007, Southworth asked Lt. Gov. Barbara Lawton for help bring other disabled and orphaned children to the US.

By 2009, 16-year-old Ala'a had become a United States citizen.
