= Juan Pablo Romero Fuentes =

Guatemalan schoolteacher (born 1983)

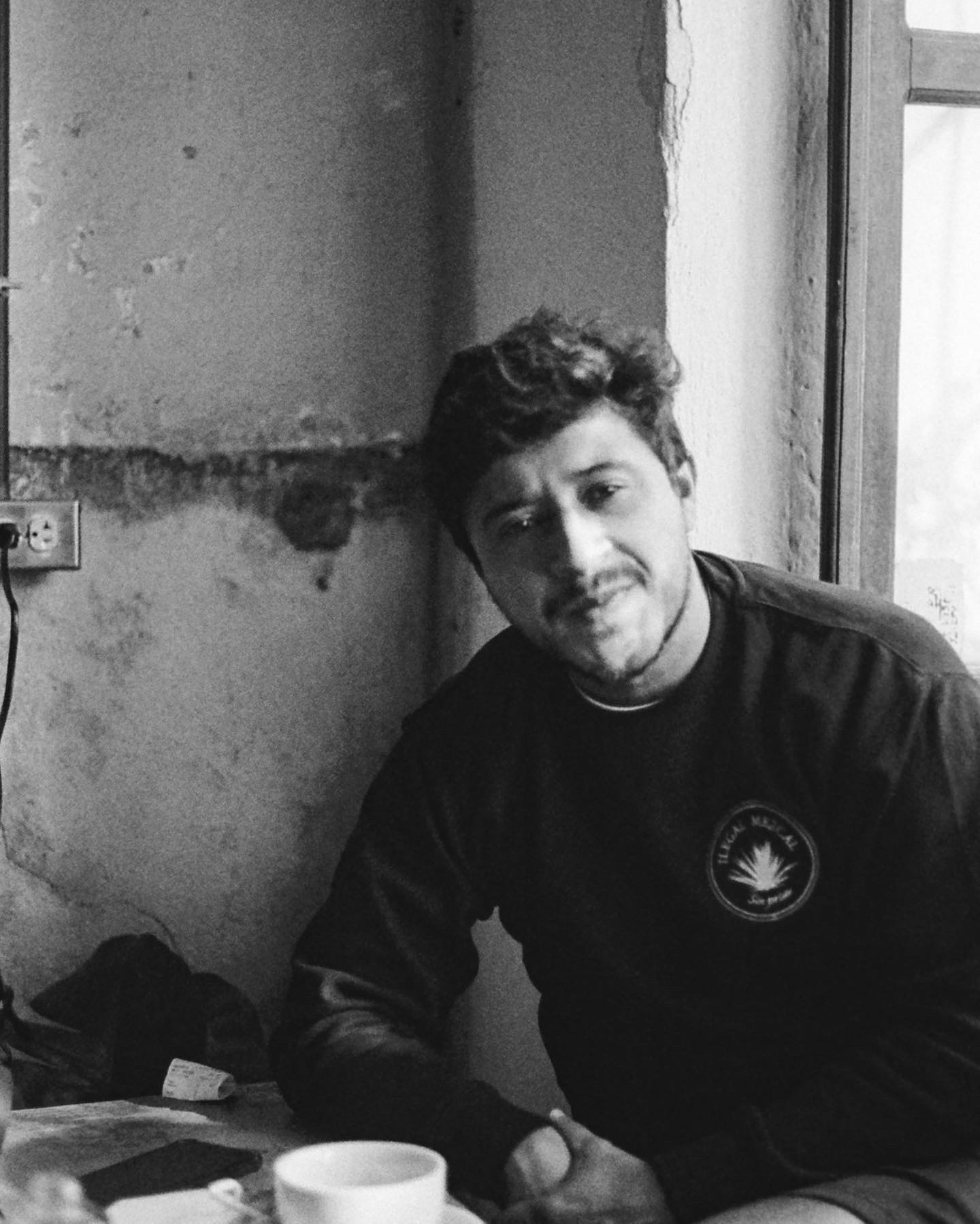
- Born: Juan Pablo Romero Fuentes; September 16, 1983; Jocotenango, Sacatepéquez. Guatemala
- Occupation: Teacher
- Years active: 10 years
- Known for: Los Patojos Organization
- Awards: CNN Hero

Juan Pablo Romero Fuentes (born September 16, 1983) is a Guatemalan schoolteacher. He is the founder of the children's community center Los Patojos.

Juan Pablo Romero Fuentes was born on September 16, 1983. He was raised in Jocotenango, a small neighborhood outside Antigua, Guatemala by his parents, Rudy Romero and María Fuentes. Romero Fuentes grew up in poverty, and he observed many students in poverty after he became a schoolteacher.

To address child poverty, Romero Fuentes, opened up a community center named "Los Patojos", meaning "The Little Ones", to help children in need. This center would offer resources such as tutoring help, free meals, affordable medical care, and more. Activities organized by Romero Fuentes within the center include art projects, dancing, theatre, writing, and photography.

JustWorld International and Los Patojos announced the release of a book written by Romero Fuente titled Los Patojos' Methodology and Perspectives of the Future, which tells the story of Los Patojos. JustWorld International has supported Los Patojos since the year of 2008.

Romero Fuentes teamed up with JustWorld International to support impoverished communities in Cambodia, Guatemala, and Honduras.

The Guatemalan government granted Romero Fuentes the right to open up an official school with 270 students due to his contributions to the community around him.

Romero Fuentes was honored as a top 10 CNN Hero in 2014, the first Latin American to be nominated for the award. His award led CNN's sponsor, Subaru, to donate $250,000 to Los Patojos.
