= Pushpa Basnet =

Nepali social worker (born 1984)

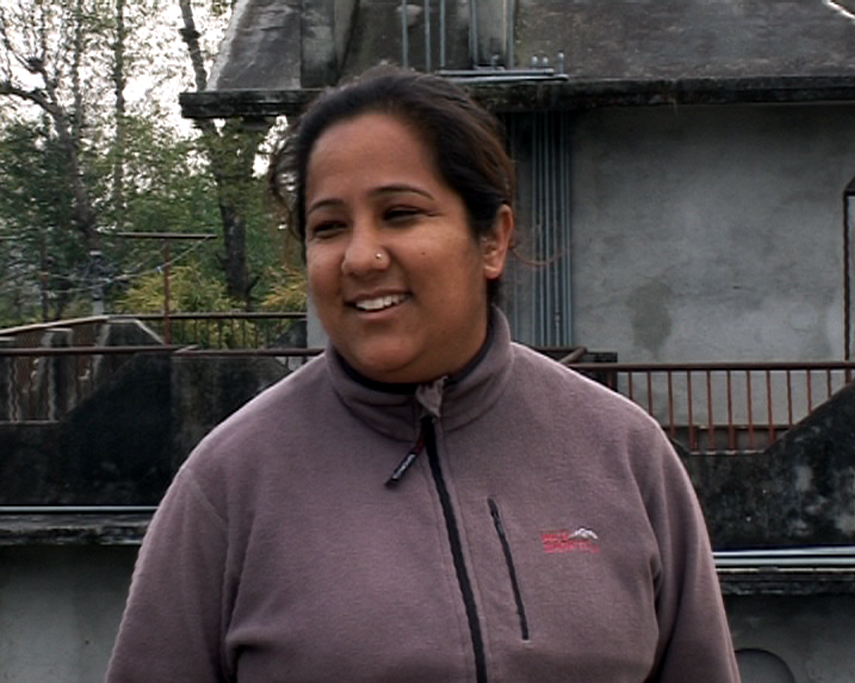
- Basnet in 2012
- Born: Kathmandu, Nepal
- Occupations: Social worker, Entrepreneur
- Website: www.ecdcnepal.org

Pushpa Basnet (Nepali: पुष्पा बस्नेत ) (born 1984 in Kathmandu, Nepal) is a Nepalese social worker and the founder/president of Early Childhood Development Center (ECDC) and Butterfly Home, non-profit organizations, in Kathmandu, Nepal. Her organization works to strengthen the rights of children living behind bars with their incarcerated parents.

Her efforts have been recognized by national and international media since she was nominated for CNN Heroes Award, which she subsequently won in 2012. She has won the 'CNN Super Hero Award' in 2016.

Basnet started her career at the age of 21, while she was still an undergraduate in Social Work at St. Xavier's College, Kathmandu. As part of her college assignment, she visited the women prison in Kathmandu. She was dismayed when she saw children living with their parents behind the bars. She raised 70,000 rupees (roughly $885) from her close friends and sister, and started a non-profit organization -The Early Childhood Development Center (ECDC) to provide a day care program to the children, in 2005.

In 2007, she opened a residential home for kids to live outside the prison year round while still visiting their mothers on holidays. Today, she has assisted more than 137 children of incarcerated parents. She runs a day care center for the prison children and a residential home for older ones. She has also helped to provide alternative residence, school enrollment, free meals and medical care to them.

== Career ==
Basnet started her career at the age of 21, while she was still an undergraduate in Social Work at St. Xavier's College, Kathmandu. As part of her college assignment, she visited the women prison in Kathmandu. She was dismayed when she saw children living with their parents behind the bars. She raised 70,000 rupees (roughly $885) from her close friends and sister, and started a non-profit organization -The Early Childhood Development Center (ECDC) to provide a day care program to the children, in 2005.

In 2007, she opened a residential home for kids to live outside the prison year round while still visiting their mothers on holidays. Today, she has assisted more than 100 children of incarcerated parents. She runs a day care center for the prison children and a residential home for older ones. She has also helped to provide alternative residence, school enrollment, free meals and medical care to them. \

, sponsored by ChangeFusion Nepal, she started a program to coach parents to make handicrafts inside the cell. The main objective of the program is to make the female prisoners as well as former prisoners to become involved in income generating activities through which they can sustain their livelihood and contribute towards raising their children.

She, along with her organization, coordinate with prison administrators to rescue children behind bars throughout urban and rural areas of Nepal, and help them break the cycle of crime and poverty.

== Donation and fundraising ==
Recognizing her effort as the first of a kind in Nepal, many local organizations have pledged their help to raise fund for Basnet. Major donations for Basnet's organization has come from Shikshya Foundation Nepal and Sundar Sansar. ECDC also supports children under a contract with Glasswaters Foundation. The center collects donations through various fund raising programs and individual donations.

In 2012, a local organization helped raise 370,000 rupees (roughly $4,600) for her organization through various national and international donation programs.

== Awards and recognition ==
=== CNN Hero 2012 ===
Basnet has been awarded with CNN Hero Award 2012, which was held at the Shrine Auditorium in Los Angeles, California, on Sunday, 2 December. Academy Award winning actress Susan Sarandon presented Basnet with the award. The show was aired LIVE through CNN.

When earlier interviewed by CNN, she commented on her venture as;-

"It's not fair for (these) children to live in the prison because they haven't done anything wrong...My mission is to make sure no child grows up behind prison walls."

CNN Heroes culminated in a global telecast honoring the Top 10 CNN Heroes of 2012 on 20 September. Basnet was selected in the final list through unanimous Jury decision, winning a $50,000 grant amount for her effort and contributions towards the welfare of children who are behind the bars.

Each of the Top 10 CNN Heroes received $50,000 in recognition of their work, and Basnet's nonprofit, the Early Childhood Development Center, has been awarded an additional $250,000 grant to continue the work.

=== Banquet in GW University, Washington ===
Basnet was the guest speaker in the banquet dinner hosted by George Washington Student Organization Babies Behind Bars in The Cloyd Heck Marvin

=== TEDx Kathmandu ===
Basnet was a speaker at TEDx Kathmandu, in July 2012. where she gave a speech about the future of children behind bars.

=== ILGA Foundation Korea ===
ILGA Foundation of South Korea awarded The Young ILGA Award to Basnet in September 2012, at Seoul's Chung Conference Hall for her contribution in human services. Basnet is the only foreigner to receive the award which was established in the memory of Social worker ILGA Kim Yong-ki in 1989.

=== CNN Superhero 2016 ===
During a special ceremony at the Shrine Auditorium, Pushpa Basnet was named a "CNN Superhero" in 2016 on the 10th anniversary of the CNN Heroes campaign.
