= Shirley Raines (non-profit founder) =

American non-profit founder (1967–2026)

- Born: Shirley Diane Raines; December 29, 1967; Compton, California, U.S.
- Died: January 27, 2026 (aged 58); Las Vegas, Nevada, U.S.
- Organization: Beauty 2 The Streetz
- Children: 6
- Awards: CNN Heroes (2021)

Shirley Raines (December 29, 1967 – January 27, 2026) was an American activist. Raines was the founder of the non-profit Beauty 2 the Streetz, which provides hair and makeup services, food, clothing, hygiene and safety items to thousands of homeless people in Skid Row, Los Angeles. In 2021, she was chosen to be the CNN Hero of the Year. She was also chosen to be the NAACP Image Award Winner for Outstanding Social Media Personality in 2025.

== Early life ==
Shirley Diane Raines was born in Compton, California on December 29, 1967, to father George Raines, a police officer for the Los Angeles Police Department, and mother Shirley Raines (née Harrison), a secretary.

In 1990, Raines' two-year-old son, Demetrius, died of accidental poisoning while staying with Raines's grandmother. For decades following this, Raines struggled with financial insecurity, grief, and loss. Following this loss, she found that self-care and beautification helped her face her grief.

== Activism and recognition ==
In 2017, when on a feeding mission on Skid Row with her church group, Raines found a "purpose for her pain," seeing a connection with the experience of the Skid Row community members. Her personal style garnered interest from the homeless residents she was serving. At the time, she was working as a medical biller. Raines and her children regularly returned to Skid Row, helping to hand out food, drinks, hygiene kits and beauty products that Raines funded. Raines returned alone to color people's hair and do their makeup.

In 2019, Raines founded her organization, Beauty 2 the Streetz, which she registered as a 501(c)(3) organization. At the time, she made about 400 meals a week in her apartment in Long Beach each week, which she then delivered to Skid Row. When the COVID-19 pandemic began in 2020, Raines shifted the priorities of Beauty 2 the Streetz to adapt to the changing needs, working with health services to turn their outpost into a COVID testing and vaccination site and providing PPE and education along with the food and other supplies Beauty 2 the Streetz normally provided. Raines also advocated for the homeless community, who had minimal access to important hygiene resources. When Raines began livestreaming the events and posting pictures to her the Beauty 2 the Streetz Instagram and TikTok pages, her efforts gained popularity, and Raines was contacted by licensed hair stylists, barbers, makeup artists and makeup companies who wanted to join her work.

In 2021, she was chosen to be the CNN Hero of the Year, also receiving a $100,000 grant for her work. In 2022, Raines was one of 17 activists who shared the stage with Lizzo upon accepting the People's Choice Awards for "The People's Champion." In 2025, she was nominated for the 56th NAACP Image Awards in the category Outstanding Social Media Personality of the Year. Similarly, TIME named Raines as one of their TIME100 Creators for 2025.

In 2023, Raines expanded outreach services to San Diego. By January 2026, Raines' TikTok page, which covered some of her community activism, had five million followers.

== Death ==
Raines died in Las Vegas, Nevada on January 27, 2026, at the age of 58. On February 18th, Raines's cause of death was revealed to be hypertensive heart disease. A spokesperson for the Clark County Coroner's Office confirmed the cause of death and added that the manner of death was natural.
