= Malya Villard-Appolon =

Haitian women's rights activist

- Organization: Co-founder of the Commission of Women Victims for Victims (KOFAVIV)
- Known for: Haitian women's rights activism
- Awards: CNN Hero, 2012

Malya Villard-Appolon is a Haitian activist for women's rights and domestic violence prevention. She is the co-founder of the Commission of Women Victims for Victims (KOFAVIV), an organization that provides services and support to victims of violence against women in Haiti.

She was named a CNN Hero in 2012 for her work helping victims of sexual violence receive access medical care, shelter, legal counsel and psychological support, especially in the wake of the 2010 earthquake in Haiti.

== Activism ==
=== KOFAVIV ===
Along with Eramithe Delva, Villard-Appolon founded KOFAVIV, an organization that provides survivors of rape and other forms of sexual violence with psychological, medical, and legal support. KOFAVIV is a Creole acronym that stands for Commission of Women Victims for Victims. KOFAVIV provides a variety of services to survivors of sexual assault, both short-term and long-term. Directly after an assault, KOFAVIV provides immediate medical care and someone to accompany survivors to hospitals if they need more extensive care. The organization also provides information about how to avoid infections and stay healthy. During the longer course of recovery, KOFAVIV provides trauma-specific mental health support and legal aid if the survivor chooses to pursue legal action.

Since being founded in 2005, KOFAVIV has met with more than six hundred victims of rape in towns across Haiti, including Bel Air, LaSaline, Grande Ravine, Martissant, and Carrefour. Many of the victims are single mothers, have had their houses burned down or have been robbed by other members of their communities.

In addition to demanding justice and reaching out to women, KOFAVIV advocates for greater respect of the rights of women. KOFAVIV also calls for conditions of justice to be established by the Haitian government.

=== Haitian Earthquake and Hurricane Sandy ===
Between 2010 and 2011, Haiti experienced both a large-scale earthquake and Hurricane Sandy. After these natural disasters, the frequency of rape and sexual assault incidents spiked due to the lack of security in displacement camps. Unstable conditions, such as food shortages, loss of housing, and loss of family members, also contributed to an increase in violence. According to Villard-Appolon, the Haitian justice system did not provide an adequate response to this crisis; no one was convicted of rape within the first two years following the January 2010 earthquake.

=== CNN Hero Award ===
In 2012, Villard-Appolon was named one of the Top 10 CNN Heroes of the year for her work helping victims of sexual assault after the earthquake. She received a $50,000 award for being selected as a CNN Hero, which she used to fund education programs for children in Haiti and to provide increased security to those involved with KOFAVIV.

== Personal life ==
Malya Villard-Appolon is a Haitian native who was motivated to start KOFAVIV after being raped in 1992 and 2003. In 2010, she was the victim of attempted rape as well. With her late husband, she has one daughter who was also raped. Appolon's husband was beaten to death after trying to save her from being raped. Her family's experience with rape and sexual assault has been a major factor in her work to help Haitian women.
