= Richard St. Denis =

American lawyer

Richard St. Denis is an attorney from Colorado, a Top 10 CNN Hero of 2011, and a founder of World Access Project, which since 2008 has provided hundreds of wheelchairs and mobility aids to people living with disabilities in rural Mexico.

He was injured while skiing in Lake Tahoe, California in 1976 and has used a wheelchair ever since. His World Access Project collects used wheelchairs from hospitals, nursing homes, medical supply businesses, and individual donors from across the United States.
