= Mary Cortani =

Mary Cortani is a United States Army veteran who's best known for founding her non-profit organization Operation Freedom Paws.

== Overview ==
Mary Cortani, a Californian native, graduated from Soquel High School and then enlisted into the army as her first job working in an MP K9 facility in 1975. Cortani became certified as both the Army Master and an instructor for Canine Education, as well as an evaluator for the American Kennel Club. Her work in training dogs in the military to search for narcotics and explosives served as base for her knowledge when she eventually found her passion in working with veteran soldiers to properly train their own dogs to become service dogs for their various needs. Presently, Cortani is 63 years old and lives in San Martin, California in the Gilroy area.

== Early life and Army career ==
Mary Cortani grew up as an only child from a dysfunctional home in Santa Cruz, California, until she was moved into foster care at the age of 14. Cortani graduated from Soquel High School and then enlisted into the army with her first job, working in the MP K9 facility in 1975. In the army, Cortani became certified as both the Army Master as an instructor for Canine Education and as an evaluator for the American Kennel Club. During this position she worked primarily in training the military dogs to search for various narcotics and explosives, but also in training the soldiers to properly handle them. Mary Cortani was one of the last Women Army Corp's (WAC) and a Vietnam era veteran. For 9 years, Cortani served in the military working full-time training military dogs until in 1984, she left the military to have a more "civilian life" and decided to open up her own canine obedience school. Leaving the army, Cortani grappled with depression. It was her work with dogs that made her feel hopeful again. In 2007, Cortani started a full-time dog training business and became a full-time dog trainer. Even though Cortani began working with dogs in the army, she has always been involved with dogs throughout her life. Growing up, Cortani had many dogs, many of them being strays she found and decided to bring home, one in particular being a Golden Retriever named Tammy. She seemed to always have this fervor for working with dogs and helping them, but it wasn't until she left the army that she found her true-life passion.

== Legacy ==
While Mary Cortani's legacy possibly began in the army, it wasn't until 2009 that she officially decided to begin helping veterans to train their own service dogs to help their struggles with various physical, neurological, mobility and psychological needs, such as Post-Traumatic Stress Disorder (PTSD) and Traumatic Brain Injury (TBI). In 2009, Cortani received a phone call from an ex marine who claimed to have been waiting to receive a service dog for over a year and finally decided to take matters into their own hands. They had adopted their own Rottweiler puppy and called Cortani in the hopes that she could work with him to train this near dog himself. It was this that finally inspired Cortani to found Operation Freedom Paws.

=== Operation Freedom Paws ===
Founded in 2010, Operation Freedom Paws is a nonprofit organization Cortani brought to life in hopes of working with veterans to train their own service dogs by matching them with shelter dogs that were also seeking a long-term home. It works as a 48-week long program provided to the veterans free of charge on a 4.2 acre Canine Education Center found in San Martin, CA. Cortani prides the operation on its values and beliefs towards funding, as they don't send out "annual beg letters" that other nonprofits do in hopes of receiving donations, and instead prioritize having a more human and personal connection with those that choose to donate. This unfortunately does leave the operation in a tight spot money wise from time to time as it costs them roughly $15,000 per dog team, which quickly adds up with each veteran they help. In order to fund these services, Operation Freedom Paws teamed up with the Faith Hazeltine's Birthday 5k Run and Walk Extravaganza at the Vino Godfather on Mare Island and receives all the proceeds from the charity event. As a result of this connection, Cortani hopes that this could be the location for a future satellite branch.

Prior to the use of this program, many of the veterans had been on an upwards of 14 different medications, but by going through the 48-week process and working with the service dog, they are able to cut the amount in half. Rep. Mike Thompson (CA-05), a Vietnam veteran and Chair of the House Military Veterans Caucus himself, even praised her work with the program and its mounting success on October 26, 2016. Currently recorded, at least 8 of the veterans that went through the program themselves came back and returned to Operation Freedom Paws to train as mentors to continue the chain and help other veterans heal.

=== Awards and honors ===
1. Red Cross Hero 2011
2. CNN Top 10 Hero's and awarded $50,000 in 2012
3. State Legislature Recognition
4. Special Congressional Recognition
5. City of Gilroy Award
