= Phymean Noun =

Phymean Noun is an activist for Cambodian children, winner of the 2015 World's Children's Prize for the Rights of the Child, and founder of the People Improvement Organization.

== Early life ==
Noun was born in Cambodia. When she was 10, her mother developed cancer and died when Noun was 15. Her extended family either had died during Pol Pot or had fled to Thailand. Her sister also fled as well. Her mother, while alive, told Phymean how important an education was, despite education being banned during Pol Pot's regime. Noun was then left living alone and had to care for her 2-year-old niece. Noun continued her education while caring for her niece, and struggled to pay for her education. She earned $5 a month copying books at night. She went on to finish high school in 1989.

== Career and activism ==
Noun went to go find her sister in a refugee camp, and was offered a job with the UN. She eventually got another job an international NGO, and worked with the UN and said NGO for over 12 years. This changed when she was eating lunch one day and threw out her chicken bones, and some children ran to get them. She started a conversation with them, and they told her that they were poor and could not afford school. According to Noun, "I dreamed every night about if I can somehow help all those children that want to go to school just like other kids who have their parent’s support." In 2002, she quit her job to do just that, and founded the People Improvement Organization (PIO). She sold her house and spent $30,000 of her own funds to found her first school at Phnom Penh's biggest trash dump, which is a source of child labor. At the garbage dump, the children risk their lives every day to pick garbage, and many are buried alive in the garbage pit or run over by garbage trucks. Noun's school lets them be able to get an education, food, healthcare, vocational training, and water. As of 2015, over a thousand children currently go to school there. She eventually wishes to expand PIO to other countries, and continue to support Cambodian children.

== Honors and awards ==
In 2005, she was named a CNN Hero by CNN. She was nominated by one of her teachers to receive the award. Noun was honored as a 2015 winner of The World's Children's Prize for The Rights of the Child.
