= Mogotio =

- Location within Kenya
- Coordinates: 0.02°S 35.97°E
- Country: Kenya
- County: Baringo County
- Time zone: UTC+3 (EAT)

Mogotio is a township and a Constituency in Kenya's Baringo County in the former Rift Valley Province.

Mogotio is located in the south of the county and shares a border with Rongai district in Nakuru County. It has about 15,000 inhabitants. The main economic activities are dairy farming, growing maize, and large-scale sisal cultivation for export.

Climate: Semi-arid climate, experiences two seasons of rainfall, the long starts in March to July and short rains from September to November. The rainfall varies from 300 mm to 750 mm. Temperature varies from 15 - 35 °C. The altitude is 1601 m above sea level.
