= One Simple Wish =

- Abbreviation: OSW
- Formation: 2008
- Type: Nonprofit
- Tax ID no.: 26-3128590
- Purpose: Use technology to raise awareness on foster care and empower caring people to support kids in need.
- Headquarters: Trenton, NJ
- Location: 1977 North Olden Ave, #292 Trenton, NJ 08618
- Founder, Executive Director: Danielle Gletow
- Affiliations: 800+ Community Partners
- Staff: 10
- Volunteers: Varying (50-100)
- Website: OneSimpleWish.org

One Simple Wish is a non-profit that uses technology to raise awareness about foster care and connect caring people to kids in need. One Simple Wish had developed a unique wish granting platform that allows anyone to browse and grant wishes made by young people impacted by foster care and those in underserved communities. Examples of granted wishes include bikes, laptops, books, eye glasses, tickets to concerts and shows, clothing, and playground equipment.

== History ==
One Simple Wish was founded in August 2008 in Ewing, New Jersey, by Danielle Gletow. As a 501(c)(3) organization, One Simple Wish has been granting wishes to foster children and impoverished or vulnerable families on a national scale. The storefront, commonly called the "Wish Shop" or "Dress Shop", has been part of this organization since June 2010. The Wish Shop closed in July 2010 due to a lack of funding and the Board of Directors' desire to focus more closely on the Wish Granting and Wish To Work programs.

== Programs ==
=== Wish Granting ===
The Wish Granting program is One Simple Wish's core program. Each year more than 1,000 wishes are granted to foster children and former foster children through their website. Wishes range in value from $10 to $500 and include items like sports equipment, shoes and clothing, tickets to museums, small appliances, and gift cards. There are 6 wish categories: Arts & Music, Education & Employment, Health & Wellness, Experiences, Just for Fun, and Essentials.
