= Peter Kithene =

Peter Kithene Wilson is a Kenyan - American and the founder of Mama Maria Clinics in Kenya. Kithene Wilson was named a CNN Heroes Honoree in 2007 for his work in enhancing rural healthcare in Africa. In 2008, he was named as one of the University of Washington’s “Wondrous 100” alumni.

Kithene Wilson was born in Muhuru Bay village in Kenya. When he was 12 years old, his parents died from an undiagnosed disease. He studied at Starehe Boys Centre and School in Nairobi before attending the University of Washington, where he earned a Bachelor's degree in Psychology in 2007.
