= Andrea Ivory =

Women's health advocate

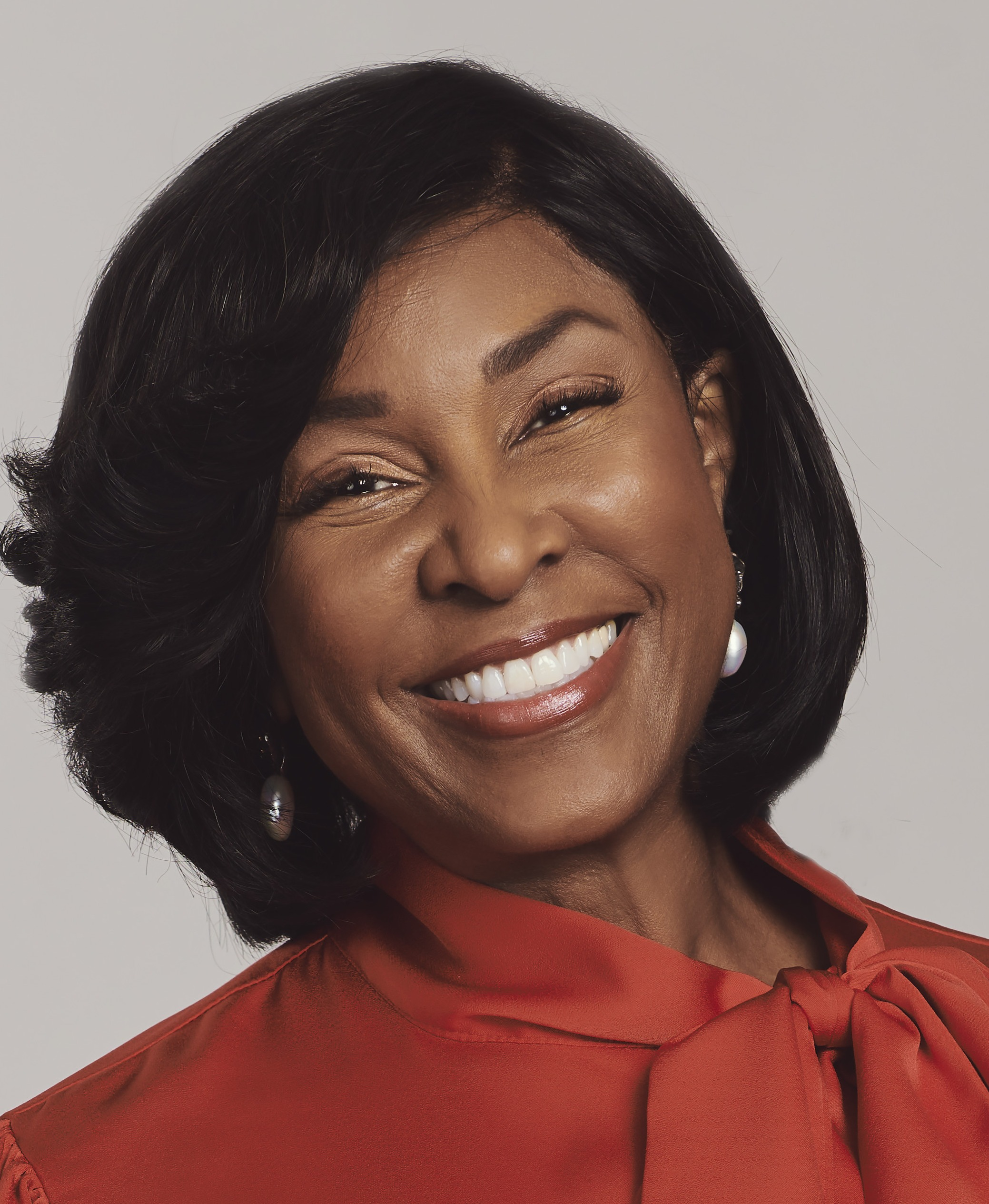
- Education: Barry University
- Occupation: Educator

Andrea Ivory is an educator and an award-winning promoter of breast cancer awareness and heart health for women.

== Women's Breast and Heart Initiative ==
Ivory was diagnosed with breast cancer in 2004. After receiving treatment and recovering fully, she wanted to help women like herself. The Women's Breast and Heart Initiative (WBHI) was founded by Ivory in 2005 with the goal of encouraging early detection and treatment for breast cancer and heart disease, especially among socioeconomically disadvantaged American women.

During the first WBHI campaign, launched in 2006, representatives did door-to-door campaigning at 70,000 homes in South Florida. WBHI has provides referrals for women living in other neighborhoods. Over 500 at-risk women receive services through WBHI each year.

In 2013, the Women's Breast and Heart Initiative started to tackle issues of heart disease as well as breast cancer. WBHI serves door-to-door awareness and education, nutrition classes and work-out sessions, and breast cancer screening and care coordination for females.

WBHI collaborates with the Jackson Health System in Miami-Dade County for mammograms, cholesterol tests, and blood pressure screenings.

== Education and career ==
In 2013, Ivory graduated as a notable alumna from Barry University's School of Professional and Career Education. In addition to founding WBHI, Ivory has been a delegate in the Florida Division of the American Cancer Society's 2nd Summit on Breast Cancer and the National Breast Cancer Coalition's Advocacy Conferences and Lobby Days located in Washington, DC.

== Awards ==
Ivory has been honored for the name of a Top 10 CNN Hero and the recipient of a Robert Wood Johnson Foundation Community Health Leader Award.
