= Jefferson Awards for Public Service =

Award by the American Institute for Public Service

- Industry: Public Service, Non-Profit
- Founded: 1972
- Founder: Jacqueline Kennedy Onassis; Robert Taft Jr. Samuel Beard
- Headquarters: Wilmington, Delaware, U.S.
- Website: http://www.jeffersonawards.org

The Jefferson Awards Foundation was created in 1972 by the American Institute for Public Service. The Jefferson Awards are given at both local and national levels. Local winners are ordinary people who do extraordinary things without expectation of recognition. Local winners come from national networks of "Media Partners" and "Corporate Champions", from the associated "Students In Action", Lead360, and the GlobeChangers programs. The Jefferson Awards Foundation is led by its CEO, Benita Fitzgerald Mosley, its president, Sam Beard, and its chairman, Jack Russi, in conjunction with the Foundation's board of governors.

== National awards ==
The awards are presented each year during a ceremony in Washington, D.C., where a broad array of honorees are recognized. Also recognized are organizations – companies that represent the pinnacle in corporate citizenship and academic institutions that best reflect the Jeffersonian ideals of citizen involvement.

== History ==
In 1972, Jacqueline Kennedy Onassis, U.S. Senator Robert Taft Jr., and Samuel Beard founded the Jefferson Awards for Public Service to establish a prize for public and community service. The Jefferson Awards are led by the Board of Selectors who choose the national winners and oversee the activities of the organization. Co-founder, Sam Beard, is currently the President & CEO.

=== Jefferson Awards Foundation ===
The Jefferson Awards Foundation is a non-profit organization that "recognizes, inspires and activates volunteerism and public service in communities, workplaces and schools across America."

== List of all past national winners ==
Year	U.S. Senator John Heinz Award for Outstanding Public Service By An Elected or Appointed Official	S. Roger Horchow Award for Outstanding Public Service by A Private Citizen	Outstanding Public Service Benefiting the Disadvantaged	Samuel S. Beard Award for Outstanding Public Service by An Individual 35 Years or Under	Jacqueline Kennedy Onassis Award for Outstanding Public Service Benefiting Local Communities	Outstanding Public Service in Professional Sports	Lifetime Achievement in Public Service	Outstanding National or Global Service by a Young American 25 Years or Under	Outstanding Public Service by a Corporation
1973	Henry Kissinger	John W. Gardner	Cesar Chavez	Joseph A. Yablonski					
1974	Elliot Richardson	Ralph Nader	Thomas Szasz	Maynard Jackson	Robert T. Bates, James Ellis, James Masten, Ellen S. Straus, Peter Wilson				
1975	Peter W. Rodino Jr.	Katharine Graham	Rev. Leon Sullivan	Emmett Tyrrell					
1976	Arthur F. Burns, Alan Greenspan, William E. Simon	John D. Rockefeller, III	Rev. Theodore Hesburgh	Vilma S. Martinez	Felix Rohatyn				
1977	Michael Mansfield	Art Buchwald	Howard Rusk	Max Cleland	Father Alfred Boeddeker, Jean Chaudhuri, Dr. Leonard Cobb, Olga Mele, Marjory Taylor				
1978	Hubert H. Humphrey	Paul Mellon	Jerry Lewis	Bernard Powell	J.O. Asbjornson, Thomas Cannon, Sr., Mary Kathleen Clark, Robert G. Levy, Elizabeth Maier				
1979	Kenneth Gibson, William Donald Schaefer, Coleman A. Young	Howard Jarvis	Jesse Jackson	Denis Hayes	Cornelius D. Banks, Dr. Ann Hines, Joyce Hunter, Father Bruce Ritter, Clarence H. Snyder				
1980	Cyrus R. Vance	Norman Borlaug	Allard Lowenstein	US Olympic Hockey Team	John Carpenter, Tilda Kemplen, Lee Klein, Elaine Greibenow, Dr. Louis Mattucci				
1981	Warren Christopher	Walter Cronkite	Marva Collins	David Stockman	Hank Adams, Irene Auberlin, David Crockett, Homer Fahrner, Noey Somchay				
1982	Howard H. Baker	Bob Hope	Claude Pepper	Henry Cisneros	Dallas Doyle, Richard Marvin Garrett, Helena Kyle, Caroline Putnam, Ruth Heinz, Lorraine Schreck				
1983	Paul A. Volcker	Kirk Douglas	Helen Hayes	Jan Scruggs	Dean Crisp, Darlene Handley, Dr. Robert Kustra, Candy Lightner, Tony Messineo				
1984	William H. Webster	J. Peter Grace	Maude E. Callen	Sally Ride	Virginia Clemmer, Frances & Campbell Cutler, Margaret Marshall, Betty Taylor, Donna Velvick				
1985	James A. Baker, III	Lee Iacocca	Betty Ford	Trevor Ferrell Mary Beth Tober	Virginia Clemmer, Frances & Campbell Cutler, Margaret Marshall, Betty Taylor, Donna Velvick				
1986	George P. Shultz	H. Ross Perot	Eugene Lang	Robert Hayes	Ruby Ferrell Callaway, Therese Dozier, Fannie Royston, Philip Viall, Sonya & Tanya Witt				
1987	Justice William J. Brennan	Irving Brown	Ginetta Sagan	Steven Jobs	Joan W. Bailey, Elizabeth Brown, Fred Doescher, Howard Jones, Jim Knocke				
1988	C. Everett Koop	James W. Rouse	Fr. Bruce Ritter	Marlee Matlin	Joanna & Jim Chappell, Peter Frazza, Lola Martin, J.T. Pace, Amy Marie Windom				
1989	Paul Nitze	Leo Cherne	Kimi Gray	Marc Buoniconti	David Cain, Clara Johansen, Stephen P. Klinker, DDS, Julia Middleton, Brent Wyatt				
1990	General Colin Powell	Jimmy Carter	Jaime Escalante	Anne Donahue	Wayne Barton, John Bell, Queen Hyler, Dr. Viola Taylor, Jane Van Sant				
1991	Dick Cheney	Robert C. Macauley	Marian Wright Edelman	Wendy Kopp	Claire & Romeo Bennett, P.O. Walter Bennet, Ann Chapman, Mistilee Grace, Deborah Walrod				
1992	Justice Thurgood Marshall	Faye Wattleton	Eunice Shriver	Michael Brown and Alan Khazei	Mary Ellen Eagle, Albert Eckstein, MD, Hon. Edward Rodgers, Carol Kane, Rachel Rossow				
1993	Carla Hills	James Burke	Arthur Ashe	Mary Taylor	Ella M. Jones, Leatrice 'Chick' Big Crow, Rev. Herschel C. Smith, Christi Todd, Dr. James Withers				
1994	George Mitchell, Bob Michel	Jim and Sarah Brady	Paul Newman and Joanne Woodward	Wayne Meisel	Victor Acquino, Dorita Epps, Daniel Greene, Marjory Ray, Rev. Julius L. Scipio				
1995	Justice Harry Blackmun	Walter H. Annenberg	Barbara Bush	Stacey Bess	Mattie Hill Brown, Billy Earley, Maggie Lopez, Pamela Roland				
1996	Sam Nunn	Brian Lamb	Rosalynn Carter	Andrea Jaeger	Cahn Ba Dang, Jesse Hipps, Dr. Vincent Jenco, Clara Kirk				
1997	Robert Dole	Nancy Brinker	Oseola McCarty	Michael Danziger	Sgt. Roger Redd, Dawn Degenhardt, Momma Hawk, Chris Morris, Margaret Moul, Pat Zimmerman				
1998	Robert Rubin	Oprah Winfrey	Thaddeus S. Lott Sr.	Bobby Jindal	James "Major" Adams, Rose Crumb, Crystal Davis, Pam Marota, Carlos Spaht, II				
1999	Daniel Patrick Moynihan	Elizabeth Dole	Millard Fuller	Anthony Shriver	Thelma Barnett, Jean-Dominique Catchings, Patrick Dickinson, Dr. William Magee, Jr., Victor Trevino				
2000	John Glenn	Elayne Bennett	Benjamin Carson, M.D.	Faith Hill	Richard Cyr, Mat Dawson, Jr., Donald Fisher, Ardelia Ingram, Allan Law				
2001	Madeleine Albright	Ted Benna	Dorothy Height	Lance Armstrong	Dr. Allen O. Battle, Gertrude M. Cole, Jose Luis Flores, Kompha Seth, Samuel Williams				
2002	Rudolph Giuliani	Lilly Tartikoff	Bill and Melinda Gates	Chad Pregracke	Maise DeVore, Linda Gregory, Tomas Gutierrez, Angela Knight, Rev. John F. Norwood		Ray Chambers		
2003	Condoleezza Rice	Anne Douglas	Mathilde Krim	Matt Meyer	Rodney S. Alford, William D. Grace, Bridget McDaniel, Rev. Wendell Mettey, Dr. and Mrs. Sherwin Winn				
2004	Justice Sandra Day O'Connor	Ken Burns	Rev. Fred L. Shuttlesworth	Kristen Lodal and Brian Kreiter	Judith Bluestone, Kim Meeder, Rev. Alice Parker, Bobby J. Trimble, Dr. Erwin M. Vasquez				
2005	Lee H. Hamilton, Thomas Kean	Vartan Gregorian	Dave Pelzer	Benjamin Shuldiner	Rosie Leetta Abram, Ofrs. Billy Bolin & Paul Kirby, Marcelle Fortier Citron, Coke Hallowell, Corwin B. Marbly, Sr.				
2006	John Lewis	Michael Feinberg and David Levin	I. King Jordan	Peyton Manning	Vincenza Carrieri-Russo, Gail Conner, Holly Dunn-Pendleton, Stanley Ratliff				
2007	Richard Daley	Jeffrey Sachs	Geoffrey Canada	Lindsay Hyde	Andrea Blamble, Nancy Costello, Heidi Kuhn, Kathryn Martin, Stevie Moore				
2008	Joe Lieberman	Edward Jagen	Darell Hammond	Ocean Robbins	Jackie Betz, Erin Drischler & Megan Neuf, Nancy Collins, Debbie & Hank Perret, Lia Rowley, Harry Vogler				
2009	Edward Kennedy	Greg Mortenson, Pamela Hawley	William (Bill) E. Milliken	Jennifer Staple	Dick Bere, Karen Broughton, Kevin Brown, Diane Dobitz, Catalino Tapia				
2010	Michael R. Bloomberg, Cory A. Booker	Paul Farmer, M.D.	Jim Gibbons	Tad Skylar Agoglia	Robert S. Edwards, Dr. Mark Kline, Gary Maxworthy, Jackie Millar, Heather Wilder	Nnamdi Asomugha, Tyrus Thomas, Curtis Granderson, Stuart Holden, Dwight Howard, Dirk Nowitzki, Justin Tuck, Lauryn Williams, Venus Williams, Ryan Zimmerman	Marlo Thomas,	Ellie Duke, Katherine Foronda, Ted Gonder, Dallas Jessup, Emma Lindle, Tristan Love, Kristen Lowman, Jessie Mintz, Zoe Ridolfi-Starr, Joe Tigani, Kelly Voigt	
2011	Justice Ruth Bader Ginsburg	Bill Shore	Jerry M. Reinsdorf	Brittany and Robbie Bergquist	Pat Aseltyne, Jenny & Andy Czerkas, Megan Johnson, Rachel Muha	Drew Brees, Tamika Catchings, Stephen Curry, Warrick Dunn, Brad Davis, Ernie Els, Ryan Hall, Paul Pierce, CC Sabathia, Brian Westbrook	Craig Hatkoff, Jane Rosenthal, Robert De Niro	Sicomac Elementary School - Student Council, Sashin Choksh, Morgan Hartley, Greg Nance, Nick Hebert, Patrick Ip, Talia Leman, Sarah Nuss, Mordecai Scott, Jessica Singer, Tyrone Stevenson, Vanessa Strickland	Prudential Financial, Starkey Laboratories, Inc.
2012	David H. Petraeus	Harry Connick Jr. and Branford Marsalis	Richard Proudfit	Amber Lynn Coffman	Jack Cassidy & Anthony Smith, Oscar Medina, IV, Ed Rose, Midge Wilson, John Young	Jeremy Affeldt, Dereck Faulkner, Julie Foudy, Jeff Karstens, Jim Kelly, Charlie Kimball, Pat LaFontaine, Hannibal Navies, Jeff Saturday, Troy Vincent, Marty Lyons	The Robin Hood Foundation	Rachel & Kelsi Okun, Charles OrgBon III, Jourdan Urbach	Pfizer
2013	Tom Coburn, Patrick Leahy	Elie Wiesel	Dolores Huerta	Neilesh Patel	Dr. Joseph Bailey, Oral Lee Brown, Jeffery Ryan Futrell, Ed & Sue Goldstein, Robert Nevins	Mark Ein		Sejal Hathi, Sam King, Alexis Werner	General Electric
2014	Gabby Giffords	Charles Best, | Andrew Shue	Pedro Jose Greer	Jack Andraka, Ryan Patrick	Jeremiah Anthony, Shawn & Amanda Bakker, Eric Fuchs-Stengel, Michelle Lacourciere, Stephen Tybor	Mariano Rivera, James Thrash	Tom Brokaw	Maria Keller, Lillian Pravda	Weyerhaeuser
2015	Sonia Sotomayor	Jeffrey Skoll, | Ivan Hageman	Adam Braun	Lauren Bush	Margo Ahrendsen, Mara Botonis, Brooke & Keith Desserich, Manuel Santos, Marie Wolbach	Fred Jackson,		Robby Novak & Brad Montague of Kid President Corinne Hindes & Katrine Kirsebom of Warm Winters	Target Corporation
2016	Arne Duncan	Sean Parker	Kyle Zimmer	The Young American Soldier	Dr. Ted Goodfriend, Sadiya Omar, Skyler James, Rafael Sarango, Jeff Wilbarger	Eric Decker	Billie Jean King	Sophia Sánchez-Maes	Salesforce
2017	Deval Patrick	Peter Diamandis, Sheila Johnson		Patrisse Cullors, Alicia Garza, Opal Tometi	Dorothea Bongiovi, Dr. Patricia Derges, Suzy DeYoung, Fred & Cora Reed, Emily Torchiana	Joe Torre	Harry Belafonte	Laurie Hernandez	Warby Parker
2018		Elaine Wynn	Bryan Stevenson	Alexis Jones	Frank Austin, Nancy Eigel-Miller, Ingrid Johnson, Jeff Klare, Richard Perez	Shaquille O'Neal, Chris Long		Pia Phillips and Abbie Nelson	Mastercard
2019		Scooter Braun	Mariska Hargitay		Tim Arnold, Wayne Bisek, Renee Fahey, Dr. Kit Ford, Christan Rainey	Von Miller, Shaquille O'Neal		Morgan Guess	Patagonia
2020		Kristen Bell	Patrick Lawler		Nancy Abraham, Major Etta R. Gray, Lisa & Mike Irvin, LaDay Johnson, Doug McNeil	Larry Fitzgerald, Dawn Staley		Owen Colley	TOMS
2021	Dr. Anthony Fauci	Jessica Ladd	DeAndre Brown	Margot Bellon & Isabel Wang	Rusty Boruff, Martin Casado & Mariel Triggs, Katie Nzekwu, Toni Short, Miamie Sleep	John Calipari	Joan Ganz Cooney		JUST Goods
2022	General Jacqueline D. Van Ovost	Sharon McMahon			Delfarib Fanaie, Nashauna Johnson-Lenoir, Terry McLean, King Singh, Kat Wehunt	Shane Battier		Ben Collier, James Kanoff, and Aidan Reilly, founders of The Farmlink Project	
2023			Paul Dreschnack, MD		Mariah Calagione, Reverend Roland Gordon, Jenna Shaffer, Luke Sharp, Michelle Vacha		Leeza Gibbons		
2024			Amy & Ben Wright		David Bates, Mateo Canamar, Matt Dorgan, Liz Estilow, Bruce Kintner		Reverend James Lawson		Bell Bank

== Local awards partners (partial listing) ==
In 1977, the Jefferson Awards began partnering with local newspapers and television stations.

- WQAD-TV
- WXOW
- KPIX
- WRTV (Multiplying Good awards)
- KBTX
  - KBTX 2023 award
- KOAA

== See also ==
- List of awards for volunteerism and community service
