= Umra Omar =

Kenyan humanitarian

- Born: June 15, 1983 (age 43); Mombasa, Kenya
- Occupations: Humanitarian; community conservation strategist

Umra Omar (June 15, 1983) is a Kenyan humanitarian and community conservation strategist. She is the founder of Safari Doctors, an organization that delivers primary medical care and health education by boat, air, and land to Bajuni and Aweer communities in Lamu, Kenya. In 2016, Umra Omar was named a Top 10 CNN Hero, and in 2017, she was named the UN in Kenya Person of the Year along with the rest of the Safari Doctors team.

== Early life and education ==
Umra Omar was born in Mombasa, Kenya, on June 15, 1983. She and her sister spent their early childhood in Tchundwa, on Lamu Island, while their mother went to the United States to pursue higher education. For the duration of her primary school years, Umra studied in Nairobi. When she was 17, she was admitted into the UWC Atlantic College in Wales.

After completing the International Baccalaureate program at Atlantic College, Umra was awarded a scholarship to attend Oberlin College in Ohio. She completed her first degree in neuroscience and psychology, and pursued her master's degree in social justice: intercultural relations at the World Learning Institute in Vermont.

== Career and philanthropy ==
After completing schooling, Umra worked in Washington DC and lived briefly in New York. Between 2012 and 2014, she worked back and forth between her home country and New York City.

In 2010, Umra moved back to Nairobi to work with the Open Society Initiative for Eastern Africa (OSIEA) for a few years before going back to the US. At OSIEA, she worked as the health and rights program assistant where she was an editor and writer on various topics on health and social rights including sexual equality, arts and culture, harm reduction services for sex workers and drug users, gender and sexual rights including of lesbian, gay, bisexual, transgender (LGBT) vulnerable communities, social justice, among many others.

She was a participant various global and national conferences and workshops on behalf of OSIEA including CREA's Global Sexuality, Gender and Rights Institute in 2011, an international, feminist, human rights organization which promotes and advances women's human rights and sexual rights of all people by strengthening feminist leadership, organizations and movements. She also participated in the 2nd Harm reduction conference in Mauritius where she presented on empowering female drug users and sex workers in Malindi, Kenya.

In 2014, Umra went vacation to visit her family in Lamu, Kenya. She was introduced to a French mobile medical project that had become defunct when Al-Shabaab increased their attacks in Lamu County, and along with the nurse, Harrison Kalu, revived what would later become Safari Doctors.

In 2016, Safari Doctors conducted its very first medical sail. Currently, Safari Doctors reaches hundreds of patients a month, primarily women and children, and runs a Youth Health Ambassador program that aims to facilitate youth leadership. Because of the organization's work, Umra Omar was named a Top 10 CNN Hero 2016. The following year, she was named the UN in Kenya Person of the Year.

== Personal life and family ==
Umra Omar is has two children. In 2016 Umra founded a small private pre-school to serve families who live on the island.

== Awards and recognition ==
- Umra Omar, Top 10 CNN Hero 2016
- Safari Doctors and Umra Omar, UN In Kenya Person of the Year 2017
- Safari Doctors, African Leaders 4 Change Award 2017
- Umra Omar, Top 40 Under 40 in Kenya 2017
- OkayAfrica's 100 Women 2017
- WEF Young Global Leader 2019
