= Leela Hazzah =

Egyptian conservation biologist

Leela Hazzah is an Egyptian conservation biologist who works in Kenya and Tanzania. Hazzah grew up in Egypt, and completed her undergraduate and graduate degrees in the United States. In 2007, Hazzah founded Lion Guardians, which works to protect lions in East Africa along with the indigenous Maasai people. In 2014, Hazzah was named one of CNN's "Top ten heroes" of 2014.

== Childhood and education ==
Hazzah grew up in Egypt. As a child, her family members told her stories of listening to roaring lions from the roof of their house, something that was no longer possible because lions were extinct in Egypt. Hazzah states that hearing this story inspired her to pursue lion conservation as a career. She earned her bachelor's degree in Biology from Denison University in Granville, Ohio in the US, graduating in 2002. While earning her master's degree in conservation Biology, Hazzah carried out research in Kenya, where she witnessed the difficulties of lion conservation. She earned her degree from the University of Wisconsin, Madison, where she went on to earn a doctorate as well. Her research focused on the reasons behind the then-recent increases in lion killings.

== Lion Guardians ==
Hazzah lived with the indigenous Mbirikani Maasai for a year, studying their relationship with lions, while working for the group Living with Lions. Hazzah lived in the region adjacent to the Chyulu Hills National Park, and participated in the daily life of the Maasai community. Killing a lion is a rite of passage for young Maasai men. The Maasai have a complex relationship with lions; the lions kill the Maasai's livestock, yet the Maasai appreciate the lions for their beauty. Lions are threatened all over their East African habitat, particularly in Amboseli National Park, where Hazzah did a lot of her work. In 2007, Hazzah decided to attempt to persuade and teach the Maasai of the potential benefits of lion conservation, and her lessons proved to be popular among the Maasai. The idea that the hunters themselves were best placed to protect the lions originally came from a group of hunters that Hazzah had worked with.

This effort became the non-profit organization Lion Guardians. The organization hires Maasai warriors as full-time lion protectors. It also gives them field training, sometimes in addition to teaching them how to read and write. Hazzah stated that she had "never imagined when we first started Lion Guardians that we could transform these killers to the point where they would risk their own lives to stop other people from killing lions." The program grew rapidly, going from five lion guardians in 2007 to 40 in 2013. The organization has contributed to reducing human-animal conflict in Kenya and Tanzania, and the lion population in the region is showing many signs of recovery. Hazzah stated that part of her success was due to co-opting the traditional values that the Maasai men associated with killing lions, and turning them towards protecting the lions instead. The organization is a part of the network "Living with Lions." In addition to tracking and monitoring lion populations, it also tracks herds of cattle, which often fall prey to lions, which are then killed by the herders.

== Awards and recognitions ==
In 2014, Hazzah was named one of CNN's "Top ten heroes" of the year. She was awarded the "Young Women Conservation Biology Award" from the Society for Conservation Biology, and has also received several other awards and fellowships.
