= AdoptAClassroom.org =

US-based nonprofit organization

AdoptAClassroom.org is a national nonprofit organization based in Minneapolis, Minnesota, that provides funding for school supplies to classrooms and needy families. It was founded in 1998.

Current and past corporate partners include Burlington, Quaker, Staples Inc, Farmers Insurance, Lane Bryant, Maurices, Great Clips, Subaru, OfficeMax, Jones New York, StubHub, Coach, and Office Depot.

== History ==
AdoptAClassroom.org was founded in 1998 by Jamie Rosenberg in Miami, Florida. In 2011, Bob Thacker was hired as the Executive Director of AdoptAClassroom.org and the organization moved to Minneapolis, Minnesota.

Ann Pifer is the current Executive Director of AdoptAClassroom.org.

== Method ==
Any K–12 teachers or schools in the United States can register and share their stories and supply needs online. Donors can search the website to locate specific schools and classrooms that need supplies. Donors can give to a specific teacher/school, search for a teacher/school in their community, or give to a Spotlight Fund. Teachers can spend the funds immediately. Donors receive thank you emails, impact stories, and a list of supplies purchased by their adopted classroom.

== Disaster relief program ==
Since 2012, AdoptAClassroom.org's disaster relief program has helped US schools after devastating natural disasters in Paradise, California following massive wildfires (2019); Puerto Rico following Hurricane Maria (2018); Texas following Hurricane Harvey (2018); North Carolina and South Carolina following Hurricane Florence (2018); Baton Rouge, Louisiana following flood damage (2016); Moore, Oklahoma after tornado damage (2013); New York, New York following Hurricane Sandy (2012); and more.

== Partnership with Sheryl Crow ==
In February 2016, Sheryl Crow became a national spokesperson for AdoptAClassroom.org.

== Live Real Change ==
In 2013, AdoptAClassroom.org was featured in a television documentary titled Live Real Change. The special discussed the lack of funding in classrooms and celebrated teachers. It featured many celebrities including Justin Bieber, Miley Cyrus, Pitbull, Lady Antebellum, LMFAO, and Matthew Morrison.

== Awards ==
=== Burlington | Adopt-A-Classroom ===
- 2018 GOLD Halo Award Winner in Education

=== OfficeMax | Adopt-A-Classroom ===
- 2008 Cause Marketing Halo Award
  - Best Social Service/Education Campaign
- Retail Advertising and Marketing Association Peter Glenn Award

=== Jones New York in the Classroom | Adopt-A-Classroom ===
- 2006 Cause Marketing Halo Awards
  - Best Social Service/Education Campaign
  - Best National/Local Integration
- American Apparel and Footwear Association's Excellence in Social Responsibility
