= Amy Wright (activist) =

American advocate for disabled people

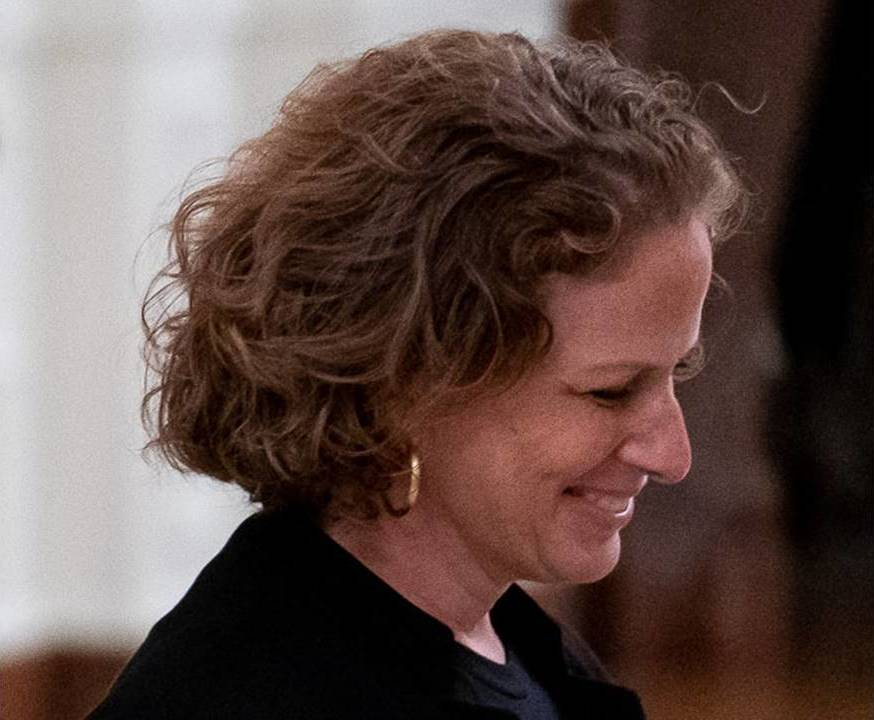
Amy Wright

Amy Wright is an American advocate for disabled people who was named 2017 CNN Hero of the Year. Wright employs forty people with physical and intellectual disabilities at her coffee shop, Bitty and Beau's in Wilmington, North Carolina. She opened the shop in January 2016 after learning that a high percentage of disabled people were unemployed. She was born in Houston, Texas on September 21, 1975. As the mother of two children with Down syndrome, she wanted to create a business where people like her son and daughter could "work and shine." Wright plans to open a second location in Charleston, South Carolina.

The CNN Hero of the Year award comes with a cash prize of $100,000. Actress Diane Lane presented Wright with the award on December 17, 2017, at the 11th annual ceremony in New York. In her acceptance speech, Wright addressed her two youngest children directly, saying, "I would not change you for the world, but I will change the world for you."

In 2013, Wright wrote a song called "It Starts with a Voice" to promote inclusion and acceptance of intellectually disabled people. Her husband, Ben Wright, also ran a company that employed people with disabilities; it was called "Ready, Willing, and Able" and was featured on WWAY in 2015. Wright's two older children have also been involved in disability advocacy.
