= Dana Bullen =

American journalist (1931–2007)

Dana R. Bullen
- Born: August 6, 1931; Boston, Massachusetts
- Died: June 25, 2007 (aged 75); Alexandria, Virginia
- Education: University of Florida
- Employers: World Press Freedom Committee; The Washington Star
- Known for: Being the executive director of the World Press Freedom Committee
- Spouse: Joyce Bullen

Dana Ripley Bullen II (August 6, 1931 – June 25, 2007) was executive director (1981–1996) and senior advisor (1997-2007) of the World Press Freedom Committee, a since closed non-profit organization based in Reston, Virginia. Prior to that, he had been the foreign editor of The Washington Star, which closed in 1981.

Bullen attended Phillips Academy Andover, and earned a Bachelor of Science in Journalism at the University of Florida's College of Journalism in 1953, followed by a Juris Doctor at that university's College of Law in 1956.

He was hired as a reporter at The Washington Star in 1960. Over the next 21 years, he became a syndicated columnist, an assistant news editor, and was The Star's foreign editor when it folded in 1981.

Bullen had started volunteering with the World Press Freedom Committee (WPFC) in 1980, concerned about the effort by numerous member nations of UNESCO to push through a "New World Information and Communication Order", granting them control of news distribution. When The Star folded, he became the WPFC's full-time Executive Director. At the time of Bullen's death, then Executive Director Mark Bench praised Bullen's leadership, stating that Bullen "was able to see from a distance, though hidden in code words, restrictions by intergovernmental organizations on press freedom", thus bringing the attention needed "to prevent those restrictions".

Bullen, who was married to the former Joyce Cullen, died from cancer on June 25, 2007.

== Awards and honors ==
Bullen received a Nieman Fellowship at Harvard University for 1966-67 and a Research Fellowship at the Harvard University Asia Center for 1971.

During 1980–81, Bullen was Journalist in Residence at The Fletcher School at Tufts University.

In 2000, the Inter American Press Association honored him with their Chapultepec Grand Prize in recognition of his work for press freedom. In 2009, the University of Florida College of Journalism and Communications inducted Bullen into their Hall of Fame.
