= Tunisia Monitoring Group =

The Tunisia Monitoring Group (IFEX-TMG) is a coalition of 21 free-expression organisations that belong to the International Freedom of Expression Exchange (IFEX), a global network of non-governmental organisations that promotes and defends the right to freedom of expression and freedom of the press.

The IFEX-TMG monitors free expression violations in Tunisia and works to raise international awareness of censorship in the country. In the lead-up to, and during, the November 2005 World Summit on the Information Society (WSIS), the IFEX-TMG called attention to Tunisia's failure to respect international human rights standards as the summit's host.

In the years running up to and during the Arab Spring, and the immediate months after, the chairman spokesman and chief fundraiser of the IFEX-TMG was Rohan Jayasekera, then Associate Editor of Index on Censorship. He was succeeded in 2012 by Virginie Jouan of the World Association of Newspapers who remained in post until IFEX wound up the group in late 2012.

== April 2011 IFEX-TMG mission to Tunisia ==
A mission carried out in April 2011 post-revolution took place in an entirely different context. In stark contrast to previous missions, the delegation of seven IFEX-TMG member groups was able to meet and talk openly with civil society groups, human rights activists, journalists, bloggers and representatives from across the political spectrum. The work of the IFEX-TMG in consistently raising freedom of expression issues both inside Tunisia and on the international stage during the country's darkest years was widely praised, while opinions on how the transition process is unfolding were freely given. A full report is being issued on 1 June 2011.

== Previous fact-finding missions to Tunisia ==
=== April/May 2010 ===
"Tunisia needs a truly independent judiciary to reverse its worsening record on human rights and treatment of prisoners of opinion." This is a key conclusion of the latest IFEX-TMG mission to Tunisia in April/May 2010.

It draws from research and interviews during the IFEX-TMG's seventh mission to Tunisia, conducted between 25 April and 6 May 2010. The IFEX-TMG found that there had been a significant deterioration of human rights in Tunisia since the last IFEX-TMG mission in 2007.

The report records a number of recurring cases of harassment, surveillance, and imprisonment of journalists and human rights activists some of whom have been detained in harsh conditions, physically harassed and dismissed from their jobs. Others have been denied their rights to communicate and move freely. The report culminates with 18 specific recommendations for change.

A pot-pourri of administrative sanctions used to limit free expression and exert indirect pressure on journalists and human rights defenders are also addressed. These include denying licences to independent and opposition media, the harassment of critical journalists and human rights defenders and the confiscation of publications.

Another chapter analyses the tactics the Tunisian authorities have employed in an effort to prevent the emergence of an independent judiciary, in spite of its national and international obligations.

=== January 2005 ===
From 14 to 19 January 2005, six members of the IFEX-TMG conducted a fact-finding mission to Tunisia, where they met with writers, publishers, editors, journalists, human rights defenders and academics, as well as government officials and government-sponsored organisations.

The resulting report, Tunisia: Freedom of Expression Under Siege, documented extensive censorship in the country, including:

- Imprisonment of individuals related to expression of their opinions or media activities.
- Blocking of websites, including news and information websites, and police surveillance of e-mails and Internet cafés.
- Blocking of the distribution of books and publications.
- Restrictions on the freedom of association, including the right of organizations to be legally established and to hold meetings.
- Restrictions on the freedom of movement of human rights defenders and political dissidents, police surveillance, harassment, intimidation and interception of communications.
- Lack of pluralism in broadcast ownership, with only one private radio and one private TV broadcaster, both believed to be loyal supporters of President Zine El Abidine Ben Ali.
- Press censorship and lack of diversity of content in newspapers.
- Use of torture by the security services with impunity.

=== September 2005 ===
In September 2005, members of the IFEX-TMG returned to Tunisia to assess whether free expression conditions had improved since the first report. It found systematic censorship of newspapers and books; blocking of Internet sites; systematic surveillance of e-mails and telephones; denial of the right to legal accreditation of independent civil society associations; and threats against freedom of assembly.

=== April 2006 ===
Free expression violations in Tunisia continue to run rampant, six months after the government attracted controversy for muzzling civil society activists during the World Summit on the Information Society last November, according to a new report by the IFEX Tunisia Monitoring Group, which undertook a mission in April 2006.

=== April 2007 ===
Following a mission to Tunisia in February and March 2007, the IFEX-TMG launched its fourth report – Freedom of Expression in Tunisia: The Siege Holds – in Cairo, Washington, Paris and Geneva. The report, available in English, French and Arabic, states: "a lack of positive change has led us to conclude that the Tunisian government has sought to further stifle dissidents since the previous TMG report of May 2006."

== Recommendations for the Tunisian government ==
The IFEX Tunisia Monitoring Group believes that Tunisia must abide by its international obligations as a signatory to UN human rights treaties, such as the International Covenant on Civil and Political Rights, as the host of the World Summit on the Information Society in Tunis in November 2005.

The following 18 recommendations are based on the statements made by the wide variety of civil society representatives which the IFEX-TMG mission members met in April/May 2010 and the IFEX-TMG's thorough assessment of the situation in Tunisia.

The IFEX-TMG strongly urges the Tunisian government to:

- Drop all charges against journalist Fahem Boukadous, sentenced in January 2010 to four years in prison for allegedly taking part in social protests which he was merely covering, and whose appeal hearing is due to be heard on 22 June 2010.
- Release all prisoners of opinion detained for their publicly expressed political, religious or other beliefs and who have not used violence or advocated violence or hatred.
- End the persecution of former political prisoners and their families and lift restrictions on their right to earn a living and other basic rights.
- End the practice of prosecution and imprisonment of journalists, lawyers, activists and others who voice dissent on common law offences or under counter-terrorism legislation; cease other forms of harassment including monitoring of phones and emails and blocking access to the Internet.
- Repeal all provisions in the Penal Code, Press Code and other relevant laws which criminalise the peaceful exercise of the rights to freedom of expression, association and assembly; this should include the decriminalisation of defamation.
- Review the 2003 anti-terrorism legislation in line with the January 2010 recommendations of the UN Special Rapporteur on the promotion and protection of human rights and fundamental freedoms while countering terrorism.
- Ensure that prison conditions and the treatment of prisoners comply with the standards specified by international law such as the United Nations Minimum Rules for the Treatment of Prisoners and the Convention Against Torture, to which Tunisia is party, and that any allegations of ill treatment or torture are properly investigated and those responsible for the abuses are brought to justice. Tunisian and international independent human rights organisations should be permitted to visit prisons, and to make their findings public.
- Grant legal registration to Tunisian non-governmental organisations that work with current and former political prisoners and other human rights NGOs and to allow them to carry out their legitimate work unimpeded.
- Stop blocking blogs, websites and Facebook groups which contain alternative news and opinions, or are operated by human rights groups and political parties.
- Ensure that public advertising and state subsidies managed by the Agency for External Communication are fairly distributed among media outlets, regardless of their editorial stance.
- Refrain from influencing decisions on naming editors-in-chief of newspapers and from applying pressure on employers, including media outlets, to fire, not to hire in the first place, or to harass, critical journalists and activists.
- Allow all journalists and activists – regardless of their views – access to information, including press conferences held by opposition politicians and visiting foreign dignitaries.
- Cease using oblique tactics to strangle critical newspapers, banning issues, and pressuring kiosk owners not to sell, and citizens not to buy such newspapers and lift all impediments to starting up truly independent newspapers, broadcasters and associations.
- Deliver receipts for applications submitted for radio licenses.
- Cease harassing critical journalists and activists when they travel abroad or return; refrain from unnecessary searches, as well as the confiscation of books passports and IDs, to effectively prevent travel abroad.
- Refrain from undue interference in the election of the Superior Council of Magistrates and put in place an effective, transparent and fair election model of the majority of the magistrates by the magistrates themselves.
- Grant the council the means and guarantees to effectively manage the judges’ career (recruitment, promotion, relocation and discipline) and in particular modify law 67-29 of 14 July 1967 to include a rule that forbids the relocation of magistrates without their consent and due consideration of their familial situation.

The IFEX-TMG recommends media practitioners, state-owned media outlets, as well as private outlets that are close to the government to:

- Ensure that any criticism – especially of other, independent journalists and advocates – falls within the parameters of a voluntary editorial code of ethics and does not cross the line to deliberate defamation.

== Members ==
- Arabic Network for Human Rights Information, (ANHRI) Egypt
- ARTICLE 19, Global Campaign for Free Expression
- Bahrain Centre for Human Rights, Bahrain
- Cairo Institute for Human Rights Studies, Egypt
- Canadian Journalists for Free Expression(CJFE)
- Cartoonists Rights Network International (CRNI), US
- Egyptian Organization for Human Rights (EOHR), Egypt
- Freedom House, US
- Index on Censorship, UK (chair)
- International Federation of Journalists (IFJ), Belgium
- International Federation of Library Associations and Institutions (IFLA)
- International Press Institute (IPI), Austria
- International Publishers Association (IPA), Switzerland
- International PEN, UK
- Journaliste en danger (JED), DRC
- Maharat Foundation, Lebanon
- The Media Institute of Southern Africa (MISA), Namibia
- Norwegian PEN, Norway
- World Association of Community Radio Broadcasters (AMARC)
- World Association of Newspapers and News Publishers (WAN), France
- World Press Freedom Committee (WPFC), US

== See also ==
- Censorship in Tunisia
- Internet censorship in Tunisia
