= Fundación Proacceso =

- Founded: 2008
- Founder: Aleph Molinari
- Type: Non-governmental organization
- Location: Mexico
- Website: www.proacceso.org.mx

The Fundación Proacceso is a non-profit organization that focuses on bridging the digital divide by providing educational tools to low-income areas in Mexico. The Fundación Proacceso’s main project is the RIA (Red de Innovación y Aprendizaje), or Learning and Innovation Network, a group of digital inclusion centers that offer access to computers, the Internet, and continuing education programs.

== Background ==
The Fundación Proacceso was created in 2008, and since then it has overseen the successful rapid growth of its digital inclusion centers. In its first year of operation, more than 68,000 users registered at the initial ten RIA centers. Today, the RIA network consists of 70 digital inclusion and educational centers in 55 municipalities throughout Mexico.

The RIA centers offer courses on basic and mid-level computer and internet skills, English, finding work through the Internet, math and science for children, computer programming, photography, personal finance, and others. Students can also obtain their high school diploma, a bachelor’s or master’s degree at the RIA through an online educational platform. The Fundación Proacceso also designed 21 educational video games for the Ministry of Public Education in Mexico (SEP) to be used freely in public schools.

== Educational Architecture and Urban Acupuncture ==
The RIA centers and the Digital Libraries act as community spaces for shared learning and are part of the global online culture. The centers' innovative modular and environmental architecture was profiled in the OECD’s 4th Compendium of Exemplary Educational Facilities. Designed by the architectural firm Ludens, the RIA centers provide an environment conducive to learning through spaces that are sustainable, comfortable, secure, and strategically-located. The registration desks and the interior walls are built with a modular design that allows them to be easily moved, opened and closed, or disassembled entirely when changing the configuration of a center. Moreover, in order to minimize waste, the dimensions of the modules are based on the materials’ given industrial measurements. This way, little to no material goes unused or wasted entirely.

The location of each RIA center is determined through an "urban acupuncture" process that analyzes population density, income levels, educational attainment levels, the location of schools and major transportation hubs. This process has aided in maximizing the impact of the projects. Each RIA center benefits an average of 10.7 schools per 2-kilometer radius and provides services to an average of 5,000 users per year. The Digital Libraries effectively reach their target population by being located directly inside public schools. They integrate digital learning tools, foster reading skills, and provide cultural services.

== Results and Impact Assessments ==
In ten years of operation, the projects of the Fundación Proacceso reached more than 1.8 million users of all ages, 800,000 of which graduated from its courses. In 2011, the educational impact of Expedición RIA was evaluated by C230, a third party organization that specializes in econometrics and educational impact evaluations. The study concluded that the program Expedición RIA positively impacted children's performance by 8% in Math and by 7% in Spanish.

In 2013, EGMA, an assessment designed by USAID and translated by Fundación Proacceso, was used to assess the program and demonstrated a positive impact on children's performance of 2 standard deviations, equivalent to that of a good teacher. Additionally, a Social Return on Investment (SROI) Report was conducted by students from the Wharton School of Business from the University of Pennsylvania. The study used the strictest methodology for an SROI and concluded that for every $1 invested on the RIA, a total of $1.84 was generated in economic growth. Additionally, it was concluded that women who completed the basic computing program at the RIA had 4 times greater chances at finding employment.

In 2015, Nexos magazine published an article alleging that the Fundación Proacceso had received public funding without sufficient transparency on their usage. The Fundación Proacceso responded to the allegations in a letter published in Nexos which was in turn answered by the authors of the original article. In light of the allegations, both the federal and state government initiated an audit of the use of public funds by Fundación Proacceso. The case was brought before the senate, and no evidence was found of wrongdoing.

The projects of the Fundacion Proacceso and their educational model have been presented at the annual forums of the OECD in the 2010, 2011, 2012 and 2018, the World Bank CSO Meetings 2010, the Global Philanthropy Forum, TED Talks, at the Berkman Klein Center for Internet & Society of Harvard University, at the World Technology Forum and at the 2018 World Summit on the Information Society (WSIS) in Geneva.
