= Nwakanma =

Nwakanma is a surname. Notable people with the surname include:

- Acho Nwakanma (born 1958), Nigerian politician
- Chibuzor Nwakanma (1964 or 1965–2022), Nigerian footballer
- Nnenna Nwakanma (born 1975), Nigerian activist and community organizer
- Obi Nwakanma (born 1966), Nigerian writer, critic and academic
