= World Summit on the Information Society =

United Nations-sponsored summit

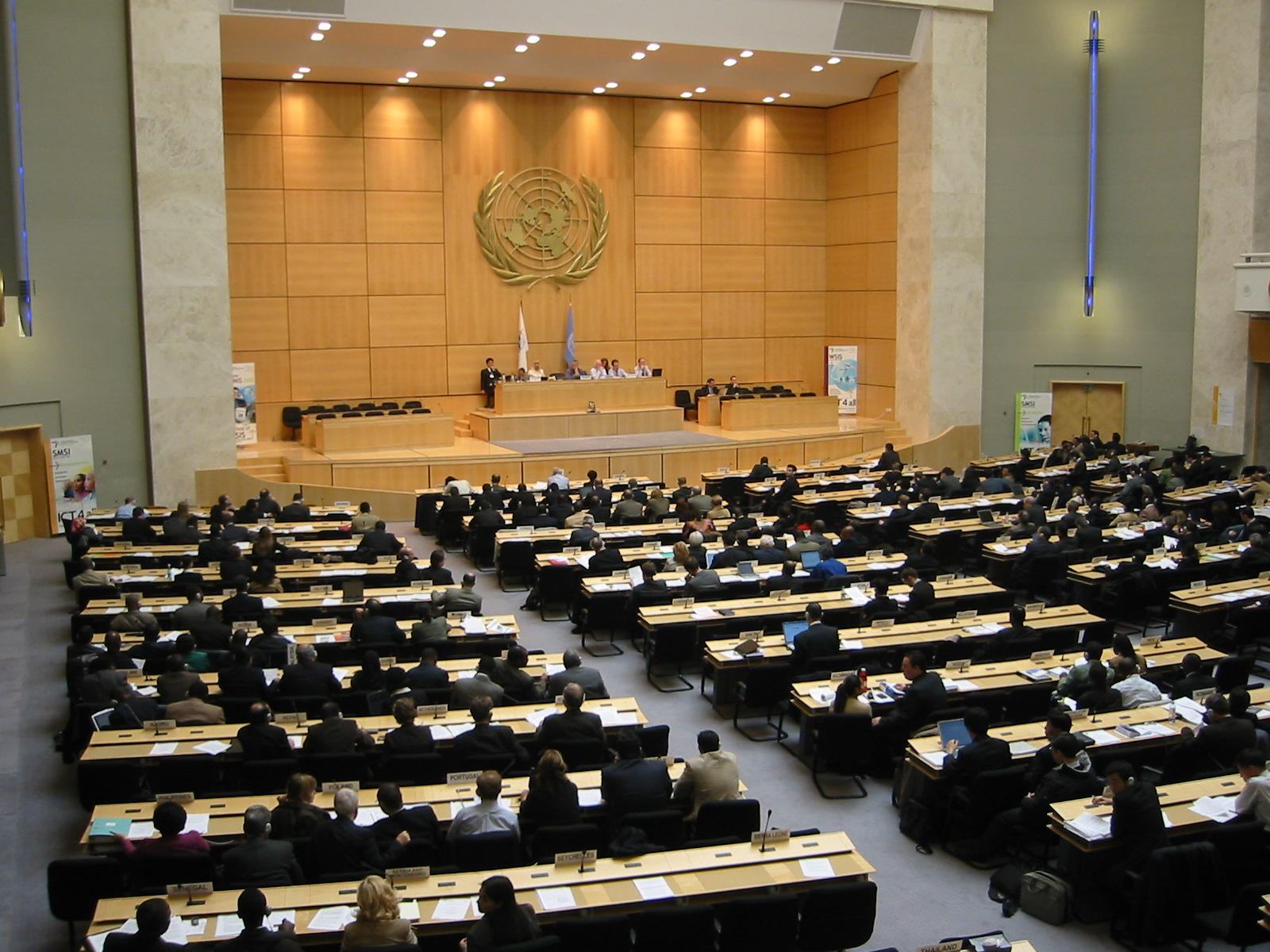
- Host countries: Switzerland; Tunisia
- Dates: December 10–12, 2003 and November 16–19, 2005
- Cities: Geneva and Tunis

The World Summit on the Information Society (WSIS) was a two-phase United Nations-sponsored summit on information, communication and, in broad terms, the information society that took place in 2003 in Geneva and in 2005 in Tunis. Aa part of stock-taking initiatives, WSIS Forums have taken place periodically since the initial conferences.

One of the Summit's chief aims is to bridge the global digital divide separating rich countries from poor countries by increasing internet accessibility in the developing world. The conferences established 17 May as World Information Society Day.

The WSIS+10 Process marked the ten-year milestone since the 2005 Summit. In 2015, the stocktaking process culminated with a High-Level meeting of the UN General Assembly on 15 and 16 December in New York. The United Nations General Assembly concluded the WSIS+20 review in December 2025.

== Background ==
In the last decades of the 20th century, Information and Communications Technology (ICT) has changed modern society in many ways. This is often referred to as the digital revolution, and along with it have come new opportunities and threats. Many world leaders hope to use ICT to solve societal problems; yet, at the same time, there are concerns about the digital divide at international and domestic levels and specifically divisions between those who have access to ICT and those who do not.

Recognizing that these challenges and opportunities require global discussion on the highest level, the government of Tunisia made a proposal at the International Telecommunication Union (ITU) Plenipotentiary Conference in Minneapolis in 1998 to hold a World Summit on the Information Society. This resolution was then put forward it to the United Nations. In 2001, the ITU Council decided to hold the Summit in two phases, the first from 10 to 12 December 2003, in Geneva, and the second from 16 to 18 November 2005 in Tunis.

On 21 December 2001, the United Nations General Assembly by approving Resolution 56/183 endorsed the holding of the World Summit on the Information Society (WSIS) to discuss information society opportunities and challenges. According to this resolution, the General Assembly related the Summit to the United Nations Millennium Declaration to implement ICT to facilitate achieving Millennium Development Goals. It also emphasized on the multi-stakeholder approach to use all stakeholders including civil society and private sector beside the governments. The resolution gave ITU the leading managerial role to organize the event in cooperation with other UN bodies as well as the other international organizations and the host countries and recommended that preparations for the Summit take place through an open-ended intergovernmental Preparatory Committee - or PrepCom - that would define the agenda of the Summit, decide on the modalities of the participation of other stakeholders, and finalize both the draft Declaration of Principles and the draft Plan of Action.

A number of non-governmental organizations (NGOs), scientific institutions, community media and others participated in preparations for the summit as well as the event itself, drawing attention to human rights, people-centered development, freedom of speech and press freedom. In Germany, a WSIS working group initiated by the Network New Media and the Heinrich Böll Foundation, has been meeting continuously since mid-2002. In Pakistan, PAK Education Society/Pakistan Development Network created Pakistan Knowledge Economy or Information Society. It promotes ICT in Pakistan and was the only Pakistani NGO who participated in UN World Summit on Information Society, Geneva.

== Geneva Summit, 2003 ==
Delegates from 175 countries took part in the first phase of WSIS at Geneva in 2003, where they adopted a Declaration of Principles. This document is a roadmap for achieving an information society accessible to all and based on shared knowledge. A Plan of Action was developed, setting out a goal of bringing 50 percent of the world's population online by 2015. It did not include specifics of how this might be achieved. Civil Society delegates from non-governmental organizations (NGOs) produced a document called "Shaping Information Societies for Human Needs" that brought together a wide range of issues under a human rights and communication rights umbrella.

The Geneva summit also left unresolved more controversial issues including the question of Internet governance and funding. When the 2003 summit failed to agree on the future of Internet governance, the Working Group on Internet Governance (WGIG) was formed to come up with ideas on how to progress.

=== WSIS Action Lines ===
The WSIS Action Lines set out by the Geneva Plan of Action are as follows:

- C1. The role of public governance authorities and all stakeholders in the promotion of ICTs for development
- C2. Information and communication infrastructure
- C3. Access to information and knowledge
- C4. Capacity building
- C5. Building confidence and security in the use of ICTs
- C6. Enabling environment
- C7. ICT Applications:
  - E-government
  - E-business
  - E-learning
  - E-health
  - E-employment
  - E-environment
  - E-agriculture
  - E-science
- C8. Cultural diversity and identity, linguistic diversity and local content
- C9. Media
- C10. Ethical dimensions of the Information Society
- C11. International and regional cooperation

=== Digital divide and WSIS ===
The digital divide was addressed in Archbishop John P. Foley's address leading up to the 2003 WSIS and in the Vatican document, Ethics in the Internet. Foley describes the digital divide as the current disparity in the access to digital communications between developed and developing countries; he calls for the entire international community to work towards resolving this. The digital divide is considered a form of discrimination dividing the rich and the poor, within and among nations, on the basis of access or lack of access to new information technology. The digital divide is a new form for gaps that have always existed between the information rich and the information poor, and this term recognizes gaps between individuals as well as between nations.

Senator Burchell Whiteman from Jamaica stressed that Jamaica realizes the importance of bridging the digital divide because of the social and economic impacts it has on disadvantaged countries. Ignacio Gonzalez Planas, Minister of Informatics and Communications of the Republic of Cuba, noted that only a few countries enjoy advanced or even basic ICT, including phone networks. Vice Premier Huang Ju, the State Council of the People's Republic of China, said that the information society should be a people centered society in which all peoples and all countries share the benefit to the fullest in greater common development in the information society.

=== Criticism of Geneva outcomes ===
In a press statement released 14 November 2003 the Civil Society group at WSIS warned about a deadlock if governments could not able agree on the Universal Declaration of Human Rights as the common foundation of the summit declaration. It identified two main problems:

1. On the issue of correcting imbalances in riches, rights and power, governments do not agree on even the principle of a financial effort to overcome the so-called "digital divide", which was precisely the objective when the summit process was started in 2001.
2. Governments are not able to agree on a commitment to basic human right standards as the basis for the Information Society, most prominent in this case being the freedom of expression.

The "digital divide" concept was criticized by some civil society groups as well. For instance, the Foundation for a Free Information Infrastructure (FFII) rejected the term.

== Tunis Summit, 2005 ==
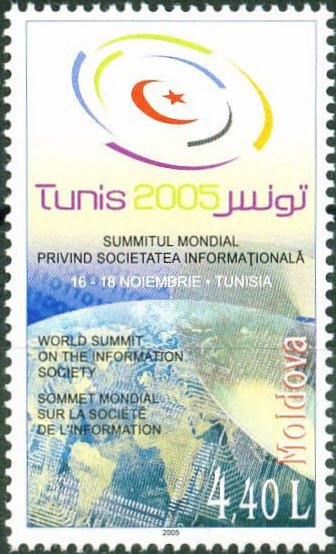
World Summit on the Information Society, Tunis, 2005

The second phase took place from 16 through 18 November 2005, in Tunis, Tunisia. It resulted in the Tunis Commitment and the Tunis Agenda for the Information Society, as well as the creation of the Internet Governance Forum (IGF).

The summit attracted 1,500 people from International Organizations, 6,200 from NGOs, 4,800 from the private sector, and 980 from the media. Funding for the event was provided by several countries. The largest donations to the 2003 event came from Japan and Spain. The 2005 event received funding from Japan, Sweden, France and many other countries as well as companies like Nokia.

=== Criticism ===
The summit was marred by criticism of Tunisia for allowing attacks on journalists and human rights defenders to occur in the days leading up to the event. A fact-finding mission to Tunisia in January 2005 by the Tunisia Monitoring Group (TMG), a coalition of 14 members of the International Freedom of Expression Exchange, found serious cause for concern about the current state of freedom of expression and of civil liberties in the country, including gross restrictions on freedom of the press, media, publishing and the Internet. The coalition published a 60-page report that recommends steps the Tunisian government needs to take to bring the country in line with international human rights standards. At the third WSIS Preparatory Committee meeting in Geneva in September 2005, the TMG launched an update to the report that found no improvements in the human rights situation.

The Tunisian government tried to prevent one of the scheduled sessions, "Expression Under Repression", from taking place. French reporter Robert Ménard, the president of Reporters sans frontières, (Reporters Without Borders) was refused admission to Tunisia for phase two of the Summit. A French journalist for Libération was stabbed and beaten by unidentified men after he reported on local human rights protesters. The representatives of the Human Rights in China NGO were refused entry to Tunisia due to Chinese government pressure on Tunisia. A Belgian television crew was harassed and forced to hand over footage of Tunisian dissidents. Local human rights defenders were roughed up and prevented from organizing a meeting with international civil society groups.

The South African Broadcasting Corporation (SABC) issued a report on human rights conditions in Tunisia and its role as WSIS host, citing the position of the IFEX Tunisia Monitoring Group. It said:

As thousands of delegates and InfoTech experts gathered in Tunisia this weekend for a UN World Summit on the Information Society (WSIS), human rights and media freedom groups were asking: Is this meeting in the wrong place?" and points to both the positions critical of the Tunisian government on free speech, and the administration's defense of its record. Finally, when it comes to reporting on the unfair global village, and communication rights we have within it, isn't it ironic that the awareness and ability to keep up with the issue - of information - is itself so unfair?

=== Debate over internet governance ===
Preparatory meetings for the Tunis Summit, which brought together government representatives, members of the technical community, and civil society organizations, became sites of debate over the conceptual, philosophical, and technical dimensions of Internet governance. Some participants viewed it as a narrowly technical issue, others as encompassing broader digital policy areas, and still others as a normative question about how the Internet should be governed. To a large extent, these discussions focused on the current and future operations of Internet Corporation for Assigned Names and Numbers (ICANN), which coordinates key functions of the Domain Name System (DNS).

In 1998, the United States Department of Commerce’s National Telecommunications and Information Administration (NTIA) entered into a Memorandum of Understanding (MoU) with the newly established ICANN, outlining a process for the technical coordination of the DNS and the eventual transition of management functions to the private sector. The agreement sought to internationalize the oversight of naming and addressing functions, moving them away from direct U.S. government management. However, by 2005 the Department of Commerce announced that it would retain its authority over the Internet’s root zone file, an important database of top-level domains (TLDs), Internet Protocol (IP) addresses, and authoritative name servers, citing the need to maintain the Internet’s operational reliability. This continued U.S. stewardship became a central point of contention at the Summit.

At the Summit, the governments of Brazil, South Africa, and China advocated for alternative models of DNS oversight to be placed under a multilateral body such as the ITU. Proponents of this approach argued that the existing arrangement, in which the United States retained authority over the root zone file, reflected an imbalance of power and lacked international legitimacy. Critics of U.S. oversight characterized it as a form of American unilateralism and called for a governance structure that would give governments equal footing in managing Internet resources. Some governments and civil society also expressed concern that ICANN was dominated by U.S.-based commercial interests, raising questions about transparency, accountability, and the public interest.

Opponents of a more intergovernmental model, including some civil society groups, technical experts, and scholars cautioned that greater state control could threaten the open nature of the Internet, while acknowledging the limitations of ICANN’s existing governance structure. Human rights advocates expressed particular concern that shifting authority to a multilateral body could enable censorship and restrict freedom of expression. The technical community also emphasized that the Internet’s success had relied on distributed, bottom-up coordination mechanisms and warned that centralizing control could undermine its resilience and innovation.

==== Recommendations from the Association for Progressive Communications ====
On the eve of the November 2005 Tunis event, the Association for Progressive Communications (APC) came out with a set of recommendations based on its own involvement in dialog around internet governance at the WSIS. They proposed actions in five areas:

- The establishment of an Internet Governance Forum;
- The transformation of ICANN into a global body with full authority over DNS management, and an appropriate form of accountability to its stakeholders in government, private sector, and civil society;
- The initiation of a multi-stakeholder convention on internet governance and universal human rights that would codify the basic rights applicable to the internet. This would be legally binding in international law with particular emphasis on clauses in the Universal Declaration of Human Rights directly relevant to the internet, such as the rights to freedom of expression, association, and privacy;
- Ensuring internet access is universal and affordable, in recognition of its status as global public infrastructure and a global public good;
- Measures to promote capacity building in "developing" countries with regard to increasing "developing" country participation in global public policy forums on internet governance.

== Outcomes from Geneva and Tunis ==
Young leaders from different countries founded the Global WSIS Youth Caucus. Young leaders participated in both the Geneva and Tunis phases. Youth Day was celebrated and youth showcased their projects and organised events at the summit. Youth also participated in the preparation of the WSIS Declaration and Plan of Action.

One of the most significant results of civil society participation in the WSIS first phase was the insertion, in the final declaration signed by the nation's delegates, of the clear distinction between three societal model of digitally-driven increase in awareness: proprietary, open-source and free software based models. This work was led by Francis Muguet as co-chair of Patent, Copyrights and Trademark working group.

The Digital Solidarity Fund, an independent body aiming to reduce the digital divide, was established following discussions which took place during the Tunis summit in 2005.

=== Outcomes on Internet governance ===
Confronted with this lack of consensus, the then-Secretary-General Kofi Annan initiated the Working Group on Internet Governance (WGIG) to facilitate “an open dialogue on Internet Governance… and to bring recommendations on this subject to the second phase of the Summit.” The WGIG presented several alternative models for the oversight of ICANN; however, none were brought up at the Summit, largely due to U.S. diplomatic pressure. As a compromise, the Tunis Agenda recognized the “need for enhanced cooperation” among governments “on an equal footing” in addressing international public policy issues related to the Internet, while affirming that such cooperation should not extend to “the day-to-day technical and operational matters.” In effect, this preserved ICANN’s existing mandate. The concept of “enhanced cooperation” remained open to interpretation, with some stakeholders viewing it as a potential pathway to a new, centralized intergovernmental mechanism. The establishment of the IGF was also part of this compromise, creating a multi-stakeholder platform for dialogue on Internet policy issues without introducing new binding decision-making powers.

The WSIS's definition of Internet governance, ultimately adopted at the Tunis Summit, provides one of the first and most influential definitions of Internet governance: it is “the development and application by governments, the private sector and civil society, in their respective roles, of shared principles, norms, rules, decision-making procedures, and programmes that shape the evolution and use of the Internet.” This formulation was significant because it extended beyond the technical management of the DNS to encompass broader normative questions about the roles of different actors. This definition also reflected the WSIS's difficulty in separating ICANN’s technical functions from their broader political implications.

The Tunis Agenda further delineated the responsibilities of various stakeholders: states have “[p]olicy authority for Internet-related public policy issues,” the private sector has “an important role in the development of the Internet,” and civil society has “an important role on Internet matters, especially at community level.” The Agenda emphasized that a multi-stakeholder approach “should be adopted, as far as possible, at all levels” of Internet governance, describing this as “essential to the successful building of a people-centred, inclusive and development-oriented Information Society.” This conception marked a departure from the private sector-led approach historically supported by the United States government.

WSIS helped to mainstream the concept of multi-stakeholder Internet governance across policy, academic, and institutional settings; governments, private sector actors, civil society organizations, and governance bodies have since adopted and adapted the language of “multi-stakeholder governance” to suit their aims. For many non-governmental organizations, the WSIS framework provided, and continues to provide, a basis for greater civil society participation in decision-making spaces and an opportunity to advocate for the public interest. For governments, the inclusion of “respective roles” can serve to justify stronger state involvement in Internet-related decision-making.

The WSIS definition of Internet governance remains the subject of debate to this day. For one, the WSIS formulation, which emerged from political debates surrounding ICANN, treats Internet governance as a monolith and doesn’t cover the diverse bodies and processes through which Internet governance is actually carried out. Some scholars also argue that it has evolved into a value in and of itself, obscuring underlying power asymmetries among stakeholders and legitimizing greater private sector influence in policy-making spaces.

== Stocktaking process ==
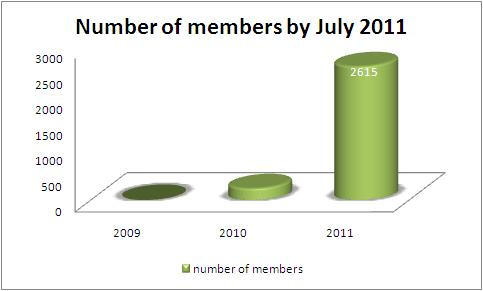
Evolution of the number of WSIS stocktaking members

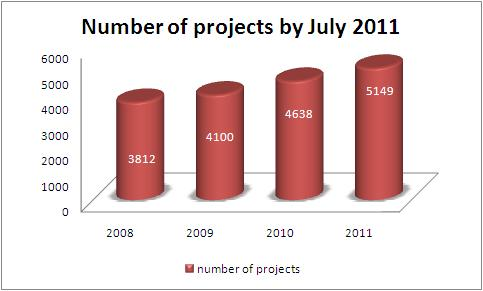
Evolution of the number of WSIS stocktaking projects

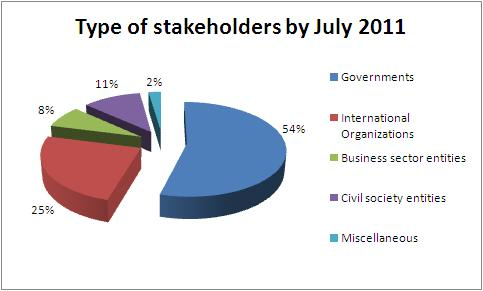
Origin of the WSIS Stocktaking members

Regular reporting on WSIS Stocktaking is an outcome of the Tunis phase of the Summit and aims to serve as a tool for assisting with the WSIS follow-up. Its purpose is to provide a register of activities carried out by governments, international organizations, the business sector, civil society, and other entities, that illustrate progress made since the initial two-part summit event and that are specifically related to the 11 Action Lines identified in the Geneva Plan of Action approved during First Phase of the WSIS. The International Telecommunication Union (ITU) maintains the WSIS Stocktaking database as a publicly accessible system providing information on ICT-related initiatives and projects with reference to the 11 WSIS Action Lines.

ECOSOC Resolution 2010/12 on "Assessment of the progress made in the implementation of and follow-up to the outcomes of the World Summit on the Information Society" reiterated the importance of maintaining a process for coordinating the multi-stakeholder implementation of WSIS outcomes through effective tools, with the goal of exchanging of information among WSIS Action Line Facilitators. This includes identification of issues that need improvements and discussion of the modalities of reporting the overall implementation process. The resolution encourages all WSIS stakeholders to continue to contribute information to the WSIS Stocktaking database.

This reporting serves as a global reference for improving connectivity and universal, ubiquitous, equitable, non-discriminatory and affordable access to, and use of, ICTs, considering different national circumstances, to be achieved by 2015, and to using ICTs, as a tool to achieve the internationally agreed development goals and objectives, including the Millennium Development Goals.

=== WSIS stocktaking platform ===
The WSIS stocktaking platform was launched by Mr Zhao, ITU Deputy Secretary-General and chair of ITU's WSIS Task Force, in February 2010 to improve existing functionalities and to transform the a static database into a portal to highlight ICT-related projects and initiatives in line with WSIS implementation. The platform offers interactive networking opportunities including a Global Events Calendar, Global Publication Repository, Case Studies, and other components that tend to extend networking and create partnerships in order to provide more visibility and add value to projects at the local, national, regional and international levels.

Since the first edition of the WSIS Stocktaking Report in 2005, biannual reporting has been a key tool for monitoring the progress of ICT initiatives and projects worldwide. The 2012 report reflects more than 1,000 recent WSIS-related activities, undertaken between May 2010 and 2012, each emphasizing the efforts deployed by stakeholders involved in the WSIS process.

=== Follow-up through the WSIS Forum ===
Since 2006, the WSIS Forum has been held in Geneva around World Information Society Day (17 May) to implement the WSIS Follow-up. The event is organized by WSIS facilitators including ITU, UNESCO, UNCTAD and UNDP and hosted by ITU. Until 2010 the Forum was held in ITU building and since then it has been held in International Labour Organization building.

Every year the Forum attracts more than 1000 WSIS Stakeholders from more than 140 countries. WSIS Forum meetings were held in Geneva as follows:

- WSIS Forum 2006: 9–19 May
- WSIS Forum 2007: 14–25 May
- WSIS Forum 2008: 13–23 May
- WSIS Forum 2009: 18–22 May
- WSIS Forum 2010: 10–14 May
- WSIS Forum 2011: 16–20 May
- WSIS Forum 2012: 14–18 May
- WSIS Forum 2013: 13–17 May
- WSIS+10 High-Level Event: 9 to 12 June 2014
- WSIS Forum 2015: 25–29 May 2015

=== Prizes ===
WSIS Project Prizes were created to respond to requests of participants of WSIS Forum 2011 for a mechanism to evaluate and reward stakeholders. They are designed to recognize the success of efforts in implementing development-oriented strategies that leverage the power of information and communication technologies (ICTs). The first WSIS Project Prizes were awarded in 2012 and have been awarded each year thereafter.

The WSIS Project Prizes are open to all stakeholders: governments, private sector, civil society, international organizations, academia, and others. Prize categories are linked to the WSIS Action Lines outlined in the Geneva Plan of Action.

=== WSIS+10 ===
The WSIS+10 High-Level Event, an extended version of the WSIS Forum, took place 9–13 June 2014 in Geneva, Switzerland. This event reviewed the progress made in the implementation of the WSIS outcomes under the mandates of participating agencies and took stock of developments in the last decade based on reports of WSIS stakeholders, including those submitted by countries, and action line facilitators. The event reviewed the WSIS Outcomes (2003 and 2005) and agreed on a vision of how to proceed beyond 2015.

Prior to the event, an open consultation process among WSIS stakeholders developed multistakeholder consensus on two draft outcome documents. Eight open consultation meetings among stakeholders were held between July 2013 and June 2014. Two draft outcome documents were developed and submitted for consideration at the WSIS+10 High-Level Event, the Draft WSIS+10 Statement on the Implementation of WSIS Outcomes and the Draft WSIS+10 Vision for WSIS Beyond 2015 under mandates of participating agencies.

Ultimately, the WSIS+10 High-Level Event endorsed the "WSIS+10 Statement on Implementation of WSIS Outcomes" and the "WSIS+10 Vision for WSIS Beyond 2015". The adoption of these documents took place at the final WSIS+10 High-Level Meeting of the General Assembly, 15–16 December 2015 in New York.

=== WSIS+20 ===
The WSIS+20 took place on 7–11 July 2025 in Geneva, Switzerland and addressed key trends, challenges and opportunities since the Geneva Plan of Action in 2003. The WSIS+20 review process wrapped up in December 2025. The event confirmed that the initial goals of the WSIS remain relevant in spite of changes in the landscape of technology in the intervening two decades. It also set the UNs continuing agenda for digital development and serves as a key reference point for governments.

== See also ==
- Digital rights
- Global Multistakeholder Meeting on the Future of Internet Governance, held April 2014
- International Telecommunication Union
- Internet Governance
- Internet Governance Forum
- Global Digital Compact
