= Muguet =

Muguet may refer to:

== People and fictional characters ==
- Francis Muguet (1955–2009), a French chemist
- Georges Muguet, a sculptor who served as president of the Société des Artistes Français
- Jeanne Josephine Muguet, wife of French Army Marshal Claude-Victor Perrin
- Muguet, a character in the movie How Much Do You Love Me?

== Other ==
- Muguet, the French name for Lily of the valley
  - Muguet de Bois, a perfume by Henri Robert
- Prix du Muguet, a French horse race
