= Mary Njoki =

Kenyan Business executive

- Born: Mary Njoki; 24 January 1989 (age 37); Ngarariga village, Limuru, Kenya
- Education: Daystar University
- Occupations: Business executive, entrepreneur
- Years active: 2012– present
- Employer: Glass House PR (2012)
- Known for: Public Relations

Mary Njoki (born 24 January 1989) is a Kenyan businesswoman, executive and entrepreneur. She founded Glass House PR, a Public relations company based in kenya since 2012.

Born in Limuru, Kenya, Mary has worked in various business industries. In 2017, she won the Young African Women Leadership Excellence Award by Centre of Economic and Leadership Development in South Africa and was named among Africa's Top 40 under 40 Women Leaders by Amazon's Watch Magazine.

== Early life and education ==
Mary was born on 24 January 1989, grew up in Ngarariga, and completed high school at the age of 16, in Kenya. Subsequently, Mary joined Kenya National Theatre to pursue an acting career but she left after one year when she enrolled at Graffins College in Kenya, where she graduated with a higher diploma in software development. Later, she enrolled at Daystar University for a communication course majoring on public relations.

== Career ==
=== 2005–2012 ===
In 2005, after graduating her high school, Mary joined Kenya National Theatre, where she was an actress for one year. In 2009, she got a job with a Kenyan IT firm, Softlink Options, as a marketer, later she served as a business developer at the firm. In 2010, Mary moved to CompEdge Solutions, another IT firm where she served as a Business Executive until 2012. Subsequently, Mary worked for five months at The Orange Company, which was one Kenya's premier public relations, entertainment and events company, the company she left to start the Glass House PR in August 2012.

=== Glass House PR ===
In August 2012, Mary founded Glass House PR, a Kenyan Public relations agency. According to Tuko.co.ke, Mary started the company with an initial capital of Ksh6,000 ($45.80) from her savings, a laptop, and a modem. The firm has become a respected brand that has consulted for companies like Facebook, Viber, and the Ethiopian Government, among other entities in East, South and West Africa. Since its founding, she has served as CEO of the company. In 2023, Mary Njoki with James Mwangi, Nelly Cheboi, Catherine Mahugu and Kithure Kindiki were only Kenyans listed among 50 African Trailblazers by Business Review Africa.

=== A Billion Startups ===
Mary is founder of A Billion Startups, a free mentorship program that educates entrepreneurs about brand visibility and sustainable development, established in 2017. Since 2021, Mary and Glass House PR are known for organizing annually the Africa Digital Finance Summit, a thought-leadership conference featuring governments, central banks across Africa, executives in the fintech space, and other influential decision-makers, to share their thoughts on the future of finance. The inaugural African Digital Finance Summit was held in Nairobi, Kenya in February 2021. In 2022, event took place on 22nd – 24 February in Nairobi, Kenya. The three-day event was themed "The Future of Finance in Africa; our pathway to financial freedom". In 2024, the summit will be held between the 20th and the 22nd of November 2024 in Johannesburg, South Africa.

== Recognitions ==
2016: FOYA Awards named her Founder of the Year. 2016: Top 10 of Under 30 and In Charge by the Daily Nation. 2017: Young African Women Leadership Excellence Award by Center for Economics and Development in South Africa. 2018: Africa's Top 40 under 40 Women Leaders by Amazon Watch Magazine. 2018: Nominated for Kenya Young Entrepreneurs Awards (YEA Awards). 2024: Top 50 most influential and Inspirational CEO in Kenya by Africapital.
