= Catherine Mahugu =

Kenyan software businessperson

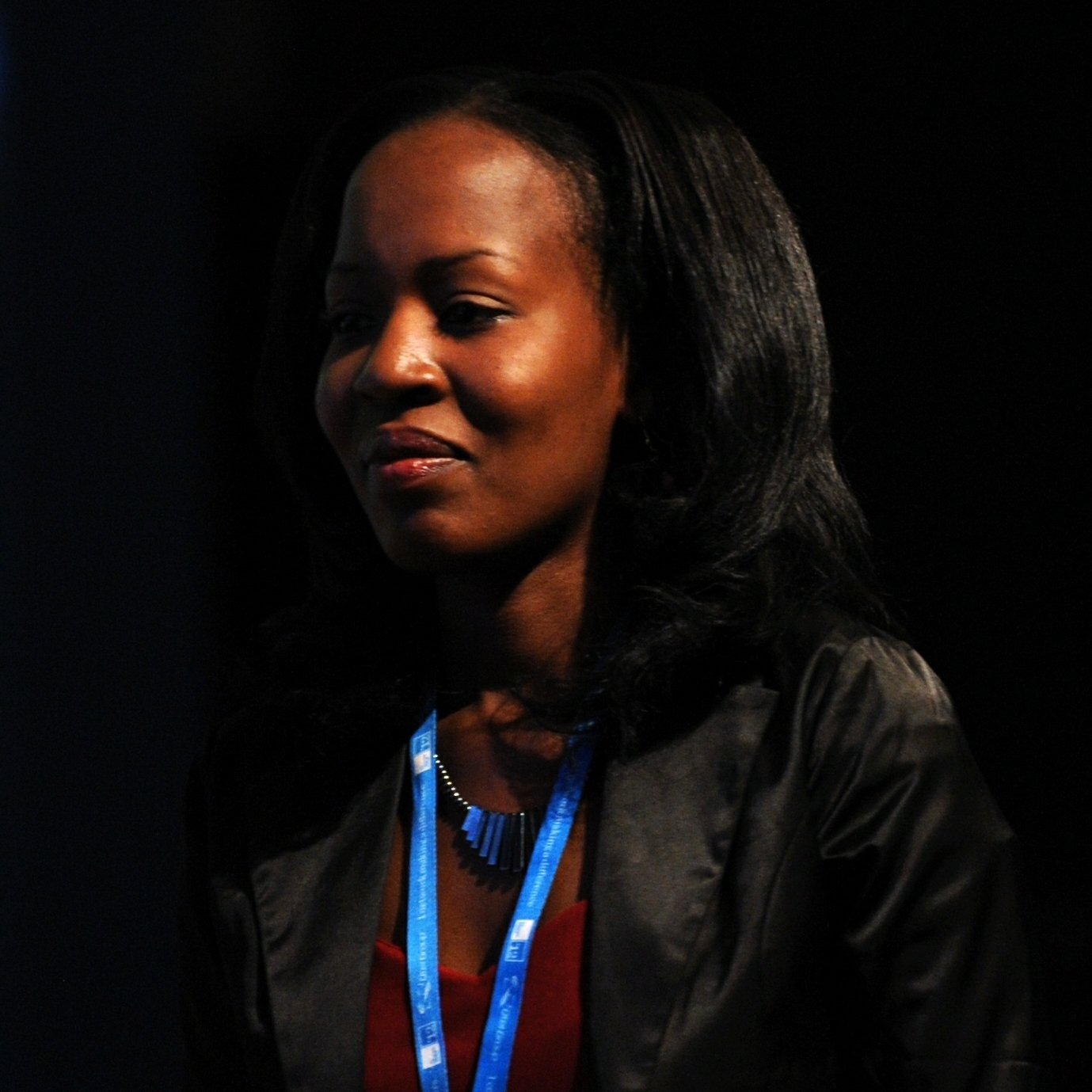
- Born: c. 1988
- Occupation: businessperson
- Known for: supplier to consumer apps

Catherine Mahugu (born c. 1988) is a Kenyan entrepreneur who has created companies to allow producers to sell their products direct to the consumer. Her first company, Soko, involved hand-made products like jewellery and her second company, Chiswara, sold Kenyan coffee. She has received several fellowships and she was included in the Forbes 30 under 30 and the BBC 100 Women lists.

== Life ==
Mahugu studied computer science, because she wanted to be a woman in STEM. Marketing and communications were seen as more appropriate subjects but she rejected them. Early in her career she was involved with applications to help people find clean water and secondly to help people with disabilities to read. She had worked with Stanford University students.

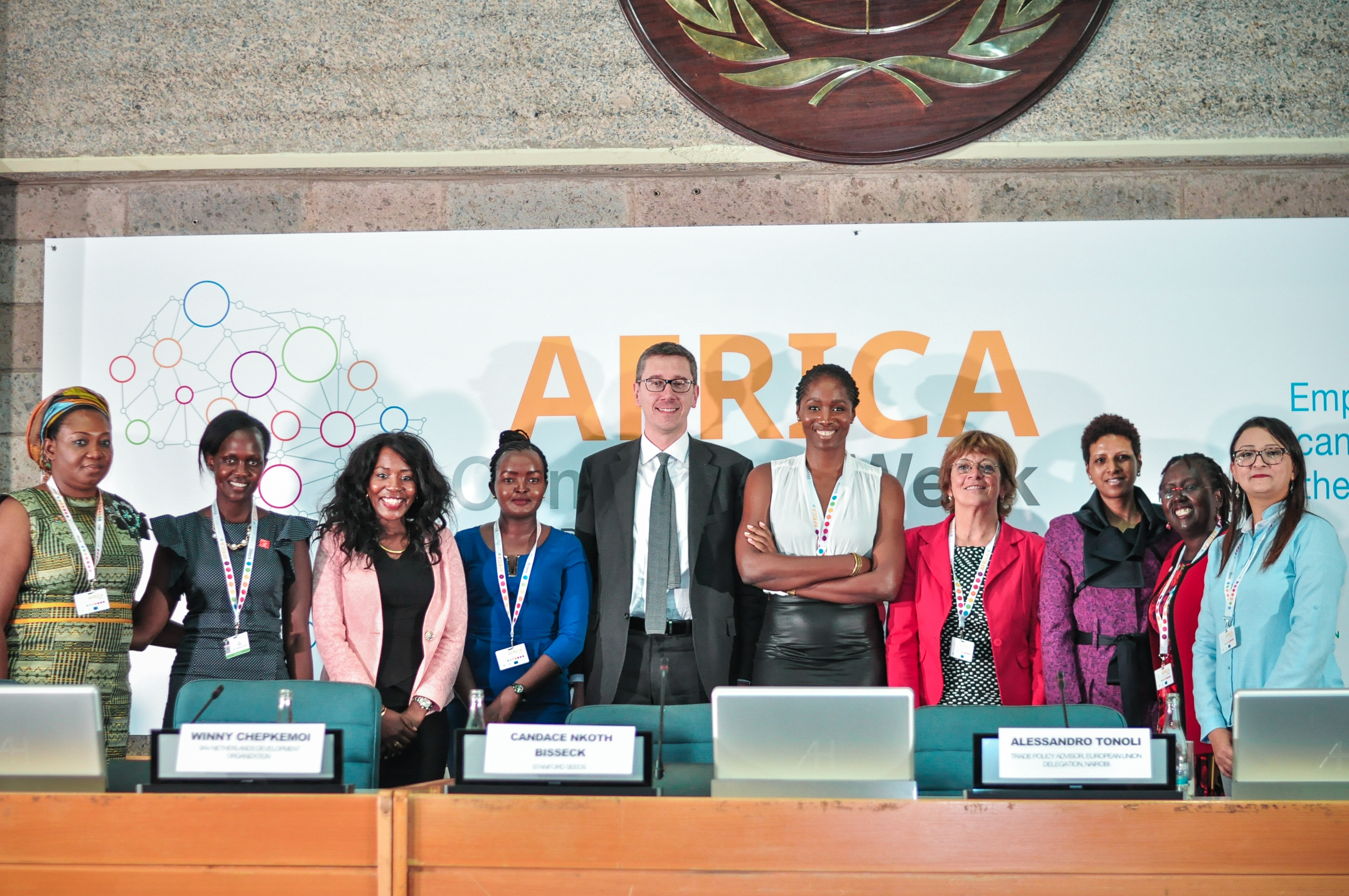
2018 Panel left to right:Nnenna Nwakanma, Nancy Amunga, Mahugu, Winny Chepkemoi, A Tonili, Candace Nkoth Bisseck, Isabelle Durant, Zebib Kavuma, Monica Kerretts & Aicha Jeridi

She worked with Gwendolyn Floyd and Ella Peinovich to created an e-commerce site and app. They had seen artisans spending a day in the Maasai market place trying to sell their creations for little or no return. They thought that they could improve on this business model. The application they created allows users to sell their hand-crafted jewellery and to receive a share of the sale price. The problems were not just software and funding, but also culture. The infrastructure required to deliver and collect goods and payment was not universally available, guaranteed or trusted in Kenya. The company had to employ people locally to bridge the infrastructure gaps and to improve their customers confidence in e-commerce.

Mahugu made the 30 under 30 part of the BBC 100 women list in 2015. Before the age of thirty, Mahugu, she was chosen to be in the Forbes 30 under 30 list. She believes this is due to setting herself no limits.

In 2023, she was featured in UNCTAD's eighth World Investment Forum in Dubai. There she was talking about another business called Chiswara which allows consumers to buy coffee from the people who make it.

== Speaking ==
Mahunga has received a number of fellowships and invitations to speak at events organised by the World Bank, the BBC, Harvard University, The Economist and The Financial Times.
