= Canadian Journalists for Free Expression =

Canadian non-governmental organization

- Founded: 1981
- Type: Non-profit NGO
- Purpose: Freedom of speech Freedom of expression
- Location: Canada
- Region served: Worldwide
- Method: Advocacy
- Executive Director: Tom Henheffer
- Employees: 5
- Volunteers: 100
- Website: www.cjfe.org

Canadian Journalists for Free Expression (CJFE) is a Canadian non-governmental organization supported by Canadian journalists and advocates of freedom of expression. The purpose of the organization is to defend the rights of journalists and contribute to the development of press freedom throughout the world. CJFE recognizes that these rights are not confined to journalists and strongly supports and defends the broader objective of freedom of expression in Canada and around the world.

== History ==
CJFE was established in 1981, and parented initially by the Centre for Investigative Journalism (CIJ) (now the Canadian Association of Journalists) as the CIJ Latin American Committee. In 1984 the group's name was changed to the Canadian Committee to Protect Journalists. Then in 1998 it became Canadian Journalists for Free Expression. Many of the centre's members were shocked at the life-threatening conditions for journalists working in Latin America during the early 1980s. From 1979 to 1981, some 150 journalists had been killed or disappeared while in the custody of security forces in the region. Moved to action by this violence against their southern counterparts, the CIJ agreed to form a special committee to campaign against the kidnapping, torture and murder of media workers throughout Latin America. It was thus that the CIJ Latin American Committee came into being.

Working groups were formed in several cities, including Toronto, Montreal, Winnipeg, Vancouver and Ottawa. Each centre maintained files on violations of freedom of expression for different countries in the region, and a "Red Alert" network was set up to react to reports of attacks.

A few years later, the group changed its name to the Canadian Committee to Protect Journalists and, with it, began to work in other parts of the world.

There was another name change - this time to reflect the larger free expression mandate of the organization - as well as a significant expansion of activities of CJFE both in Canada and internationally.

One of the principal activities of CJFE is the management of the International Freedom of Expression Exchange (IFEX), a global network of more than 80 non-governmental organisations that monitors free expression violations around the world and defends journalists, writers and others who are persecuted for exercising their right to freedom of expression.

== Awards ==
The CJFE International Press Freedom Awards, which were launched in 1998, have become the signature event of the organization's press freedom awareness activities in Canada. The gala dinner brings together some of the biggest names in Canadian media to honour colleagues from Canada and around the world who have been persecuted because of their work.

Two awards are given each year to foreign journalists who overcome great odds to report the news. Past award winners include Tunisian journalist and human rights activist Sihem Bensedrine, Canadian photographer Zahra Kazemi, Kazakhstani journalist Lira Baysetova and Iranian journalist Akbar Ganji.

CJFE presents three other awards: the Tara Singh Hayer Press Freedom Award, the Vox Libera Award, and the Integrity Award.

The Tara Singh Hayer Press Freedom Award honours a Canadian journalist who, through his or her work, has made an important contribution to reinforcing and promoting the principle of freedom of the press in this country or elsewhere. The award is named after the Canadian journalist and editor of the Vancouver-based Indo-Canadian Times who was assassinated in November 1998.

The Vox Libera Award is given to a non-journalist who has demonstrated an outstanding commitment to the principles of free expression and who has had made an important and sustained contribution - at home or abroad - to those same principles.

The Integrity Award was developed to recognize and build awareness of the need to protect the rights of "whistleblowers." The recipients of this award are individuals who have acted courageously in the public interest without thought of personal gain, and in doing so risked reprisals in the form of threats to their careers, livelihood, or personal freedom.

== Journalists in Distress Fund ==
CJFE operates the Journalists in Distress Fund for the benefit of working journalists in defence of democracy, human rights, justice and freedom of expression. The fund exists primarily to encourage freedom of expression and the practice of journalism, and to provide humanitarian assistance to journalists whose lives and well-being are threatened.

The Fund provides financial assistance to journalists and their families whose lives are at risk or whose freedom of expression has been seriously infringed. Examples of fundable expenses are medical costs arising from imprisonment or physical mistreatment, legal costs arising from action taken in the courts against journalists because of their reporting as well as emergency travel costs so that journalists and their families can escape persecution.

Among other cases, the Journalists in Distress Fund has provided emergency assistance to a trio of persecuted Ethiopian journalists who fled to Kenya; a Thai journalist who, after recovering from a shooting, required money to continue publication of his newspaper; and the wife and child of a disappeared Belarusian journalist, who was said to have been abducted on orders of the government.

== See also ==
- IFEX (organization)
- Tunisia Monitoring Group
