= Red de Innovación y Aprendizaje =

Mexican network of educational centers

- Founded: 2009
- Type: Non-governmental organization
- Location: Mexico
- Website: PROACCESO

The Red de Innovación y Aprendizaje (RIA), or Learning and Innovation Network, is a group of education centers that offer members of underserved communities in Mexico access to computers, the Internet and quality education. The RIA is overseen by Fundación Proacceso, a Mexico-based non-profit organization focused on using technology as a tool for education.

== Background ==
The first RIA center was inaugurated on May 18, 2009, and since then over 68,000 users have registered at its ten centers. Thirty-two new RIA centers will open by the end of January 2011, bringing the network to a total of 42 centers.

The RIA offers courses on basic computer and Internet skills, English, finding work through the Internet, math and science workshops for children, personal finance and more. Students can also obtain their high school, bachelor’s and master’s degrees at the RIA through the Institute of Online education. Courses are taught by qualified facilitators, many of whom are residents of the local communities that the RIA targets.
