= IFEX (organization) =

International non-governmental organization

- Founded: 1992
- Type: Non-profit NGO
- Purpose: Freedom of speech
- Location: Toronto, Ontario, Canada
- Region served: Worldwide
- Method: Advocacy
- Members: 120 independent organizations worldwide
- Website: ifex.org
- Formerly called: International Freedom of Expression Exchange

IFEX, formerly International Freedom of Expression Exchange, is a global network of more than 119 independent non-governmental organizations that work at a local, national, regional, or international level to defend and promote freedom of expression as a human right.

== History ==
IFEX was first proposed in 1992 in Montreal, Quebec, Canada, by a group of 12 non-governmental organizations who met to discuss how they could collaborate on responding to free expression violations around the world. The meeting was organized by the Canadian Committee to Protect Journalists (now Canadian Journalists for Free Expression). Over the next four years, IFEX consolidated its structure, built outreach programs, and established a web presence. By 2007 IFEX had established strategic free expression campaigns and programmes, and as of 2021 IFEX has over 120 network members located in 62 countries worldwide.

== Operations ==
The day-to-day operations of the organization are run by the IFEX Secretariat based in Toronto, Ontario, Canada.

IFEX's mandate is to raise awareness by sharing information online and mobilizing action on issues such as press freedom, Internet censorship, freedom of information legislation, criminal defamation and insult laws, media concentration and attacks on the free expression rights of all people, including journalists, writers, artists, musicians, filmmakers, academics, scientists, human rights defenders and Internet users.

== Campaigns and advocacy ==
IFEX works with its members by creating and participating in advocacy coalitions and working groups and releasing joint statements and petitions.

In 2011, IFEX launched the International Day to End Impunity campaign. In 2013, the United Nations designated 2 November as the International Day to End Impunity for Crimes Against Journalists. The Tunisia Monitoring Group (IFEX-TMG), launched in 2004 by 21 IFEX members to raise awareness of censorship and other human rights violations in Tunisia, is IFEX's largest campaign to date. IFEX-TMG was dissolved in January 2013 in response to improved conditions for local NGOs, media independence and free expression rights.

In 2015, Francisco Medina, brother of two journalists murdered in Paraguay in 1997, went before the United Nations (UN) to speak out against the "deterioration of freedom of expression in his country". The deputy executive director of IFEX, Rachael Kay, also attended in support of Medina.

To mark the 2020 International Day to End Impunity on 2 November 2020, IFEX launched its Faces of Free Expression illustration series, profiling over 90 free-expression advocates working in countries across the globe. The Pittsburgh, US-based nonprofit International Free Expression Project created a physical exhibit of the series in Pittsburgh to celebrate the 2021 World Press Freedom Day on 3 May 2021. The exhibit ran until 4 July 2021.

== Online information ==
IFEX brings attention to free expression stories and events through its website, e-newsletters and special reports. The content is available in multiple languages (English, French, Spanish and Arabic), and addresses pressing free expression stories. The website hosts a searchable online archive of free expression violations going back to 1995.

== See also ==
- Freedom of speech
- Freedom of the press
- Internet censorship
