= Nnenna Nwakanma =

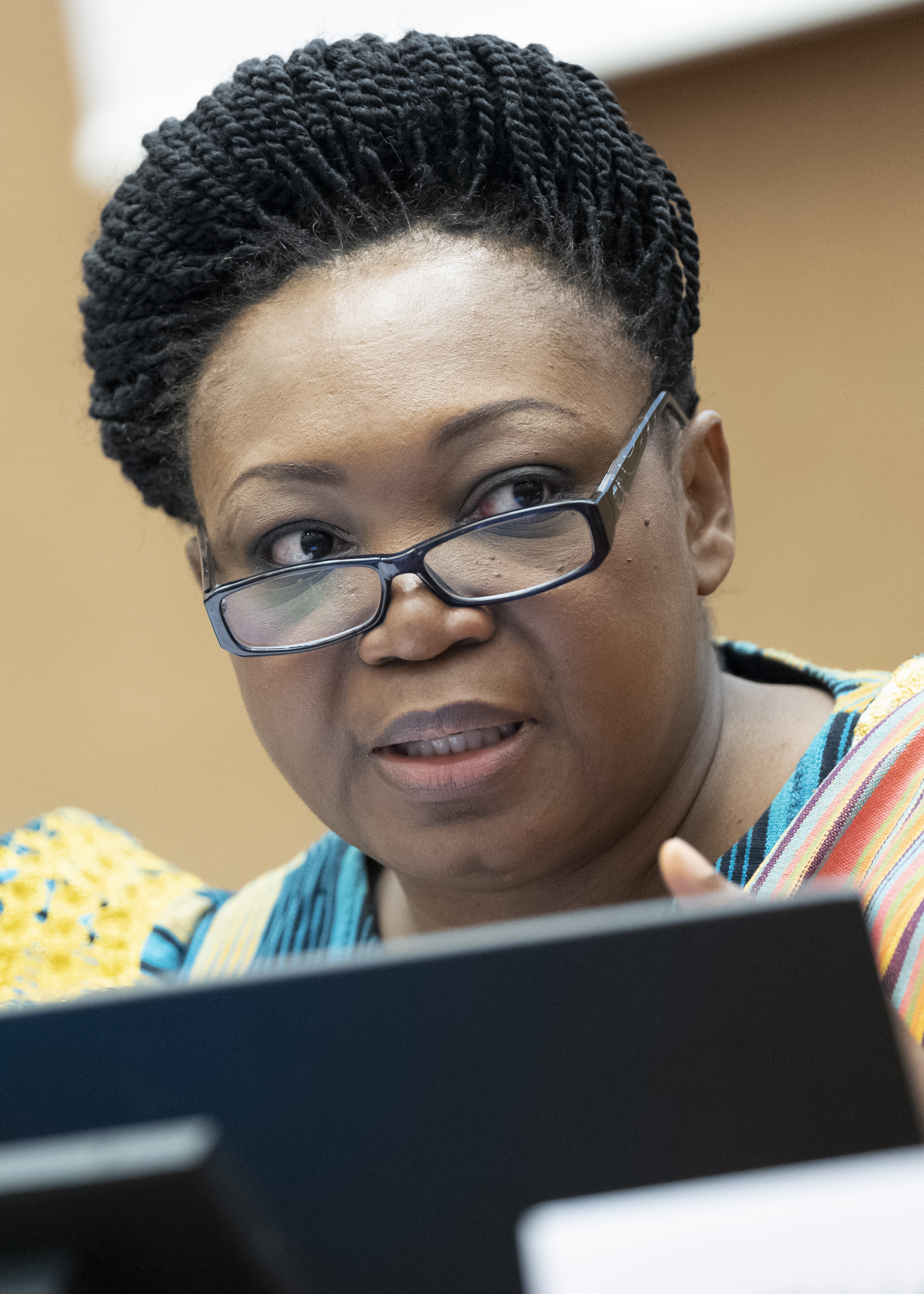
- Nwakanma in 2019
- Born: Nigeria

Nnenna Nwakanma (Born 1975) is a Nigerian FOSS activist, community organizer, development adviser. She worked for the United Nations for 15 years and she was the Interim Policy Director for the World Wide Web Foundation

== Life ==
Nwakanma was born in 1975 in rural Abia State (south-eastern Nigeria). Nwakanma worked with the United Nations for 15 years.

She co-founded the Free Software and Open Source Foundation for Africa, which she co-chairs. She is a former member of the board of the Open Source Initiative. She co-founded The Africa Network of Information Society Actors, and the African Civil Society for the Information Society which she serves on. She is also a Vice President of the Digital solidarity fund. Previously, she served as the Information Officer for Africa of the Helen Keller Foundation.

Nwakanma has spoken at conferences on Open Source and Free Software and other topics including O'Reilly's OSCON, the Free and Open Source Developers European Meeting (FOSDEM), Yale University's Access to Knowledge Conference, the Ghana-India Kofi Annan Centre of Excellence in ICT, the Open World Forum, and The Internet Governance Forum.

As of 2019, she was the interim Policy Director for the World Wide Web Foundation where she supports work on the Alliance for Affordable Internet and the Web We Want.

Fluent in English, French and a handful of African languages, based in Abidjan, Côte d'Ivoire, having lived in at least 5 different African countries.
