= Lira Baysetova =

Kazakhstani journalist

Lira Baysetova is the former editor of the weekly Respublika newspaper of Kazakhstan.

In late May 2002, she found that her 25-year-old daughter Leyla Baysetova had mysteriously disappeared. Reporters Without Borders reported that, during the previous week, the editor had been the subject of specific threats following an interview she had conducted with Geneva general prosecutor, Bernard Bertossa (on 10 May 2002) concerning the Swiss bank accounts of several top Kazakh officials, including President Nursultan Nazarbayev.

A week later, the headless body of a dog was found hanging over the entrance of the offices of another opposition newspaper (Soldat), which was set to publish Baysetova's interview with Bertossa. On 22 May (the day the interview was published), unidentified men attacked Soldat's premises, beating up two employees, stealing computers and smashing equipment. The same day, the offices of Respublika in Almaty burned down after Molotov cocktails were thrown into the building. On 16 June, a man claiming to be from the Interior Ministry told Baysetova that her daughter had been arrested for possession of heroin and had subsequently fallen ill. She was not allowed to see her daughter until June 21 when she was informed that she was dead. The circumstances of the case (and particularly Leyla Baysetova's death) remain disputed. The local police authorities claim that she was a drug addict who hanged herself with her jeans in a moment of temporary insanity. However, Kazakh television have questioned the police's findings, stating that no attempts was made to analyze the deceased's blood to determine if she had indeed taken drugs and that no jeans were presented as evidence.

On October 3, 2002 Canadian Journalists for Free Expression (CJFE) awarded an International Press Freedom Award to Baysetova.
