= Digital solidarity fund =

Defunct Swiss NGO

The Digital solidarity fund (DSF, also known by its French name Fonds mondial de solidarité numérique/FSN) was a fund that aimed to reduce the global digital divide, established following talks which took place during the World Summit on the Information Society in Tunis in 2005. The foundation operated under Swiss law with its headquarters in Geneva, Switzerland.

The DSF has been described as "woefully wasteful, or at least grossly mismanaged". It was dissolved in 2009.

The DSF was open to voluntary funding and did not rely on governmental help to function.
