= Francis Muguet =

French chemist

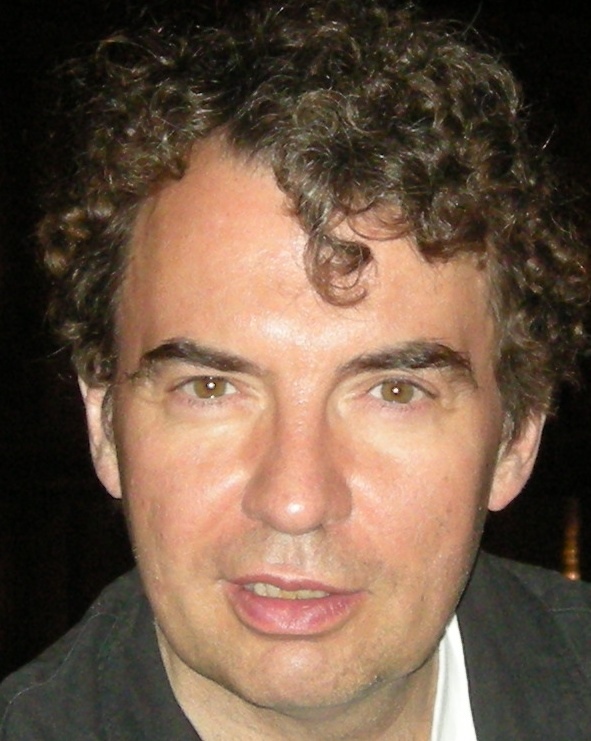
- Born: April 30, 1955
- Died: October 14, 2009 (aged 54)
- Website: www.muguet.com

Francis Fabien Michel Muguet (1955–2009) was a French chemist who advocated open access to information.

== Biography ==
Muguet graduated with a Ph.D from Texas Tech University with a thesis on water chemistry in 1992. His advisor was G. Wilse Robinson. He also held a law degree. He was a researcher at ENSTA (École nationale supérieure de techniques avancées) from 1993 to 2009 and worked, during the last months of his life, as a consultant for International Telecommunication Union (ITU) and the University of Geneva.

Defender of the free and open access to scientific content, he chaired the Civil Society Scientific Information Working Group, and co-ordinated a group on patents, trademarks and copyrights at the World Summit on the Information Society (WSIS).

Muguet is also known for designing the pattern of global patronage which aims to answer the legal argument raised against the global license under the Berne Convention on copyright. The sponsorship was supported by his friend Richard Stallman who co-authored with him the Declaration of Louisiana at a workshop organized by the French Society of the Internet on March 12, 2009. Muguet was then one of the founders of the SARD, a Society of acceptance and distribution of gifts inspired by the principles of global patronage.

Muguet was active in the World Network for Linguistic Diversity and point of contact for the Dynamic Coalition for Linguistic Diversity of the Internet Governance Forum and a member of ICVolunteers. From 2001 to 2005, he was Associate Editor MDPI Center Basel.

His daughter found him dead on October 14 after he had not answered his mail for several days. Following the announcement of his death, a change was made in the process of printing the book La bataille Hadopi, to which he had contributed, dedicating it to him.
