= World Press Freedom Committee =

The World Press Freedom Committee (WPFC) was founded in 1979 and existed until 2009. The WPFC was founded to oppose the New World Information Order NWICO promoted by the majority of countries at UNESCO. WPFC was a coordination group of national and international news media organizations. On September 17, 2009, the WPFC merged with the US-based non-governmental organization Freedom House following the retirement of its Executive Director Mark Bench. Its World Watch of Journalists in Prison does not appear to have been updated since 2009.

== Goals ==
Originally created to wage an eventually successful global struggle in and around intergovernmental organizations to beat back authoritarian proposals for a restrictive "new world information and communication order", the WPFC went on to:

- Monitor Freedom of the press|press freedom]] issues at UNESCO, the UN, and other intergovernmental organizations on behalf of press freedom groups. This is now carried out by Rony Koven, European Representative.
- Work in intergovernmental forums to extend press freedom principles of traditional news media to the World Wide Web and Direct Satellite Broadcasting Press Freedom on the Internet and New Media Conference.

World Press Freedom Committee has done internet training for journalists’ in countries such as Armenia, Georgia, Azerbaijan and also in countries like the Caribbean, Barbados and Jamaica. It also offered courses in Nicaragua, Honduras and Cuba.

- Coordinate joint activities for a front line grouping 9 major global free press organizations, the Coordinating Committee of Press Freedom Organizations.
- Conduct international conferences in 2003 (New York) and 2007 (Paris) to combat controls on news content in the new media, and to expose press censorship and surveillance by repressive regimes It's A Crime: How Insult Laws Stifle Press Freedom and Does China Hope to Remap the Internet in its Own Image.
- Present an exposition of the case that press freedom is a motor for economic development.
- Conduct the first world study of “insult laws" that shield authorities from press scrutiny and a 2006 update of such laws. A brief overview of the earlier publication "Hiding from the People" is available in English and Spanish. WPFC also produced a unique model legal brief currently being used by lawyers around the world to assist journalists and media under legal attack for doing their jobs. The amicus curiae brief is available free of charge to demonstrate to courts that insult laws violate the human rights conventions to which the international community has subscribed. It's available in both English and Spanish.
- Present the first world survey of journalism training opportunities for developing journalists.
- Provide essential legal arguments to win the first decision by an international human rights court saying mandatory licensing of journalists violates human rights law.
- Produce 56 publications, including the first regionally oriented general journalism training manuals in local languages for journalists of the Caribbean and Eastern Europe and similar handbooks in English and French for African journalists.
- Propose and administer the first joint program by world free press groups to provide local lawyers for journalists facing prosecution in national courts, through a Fund Against Censorship.
- Present a study showing how restrictive principles in generally beneficial human rights conventions can be used to hobble journalists and news media.
- Produce the first surveys of practical needs of emerging free press outlets in the former Soviet bloc, and hold the first general conference of NGOs on mobilizing resources to meet these needs.
