= List of Liberty University people =

This list of Liberty University people includes notable graduates, professors, honorary degree recipients, and other people affiliated with Liberty University.

== Founders ==
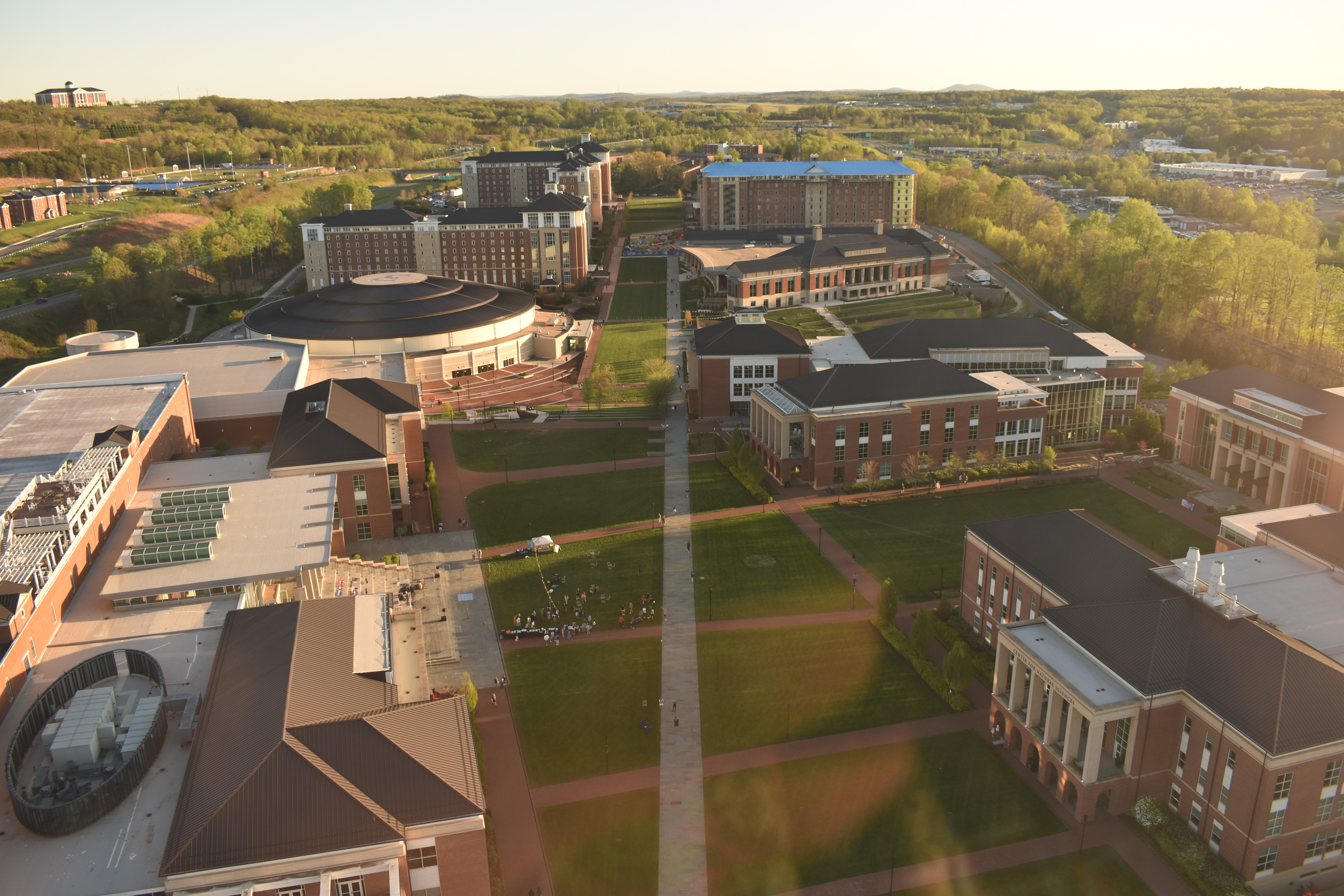
Liberty University South campus

- Jerry Falwell, founder
- Elmer Towns, founder

== Alumni ==
=== Academics ===
- Tracy Packiam Alloway, cognitive psychology instructor at University of North Florida
- Susan Wise Bauer, author and English instructor at The College of William & Mary
- Joshua Bowen, Assyriologist
- Dondi E. Costin, current president of Liberty University, former president of Charleston Southern University
- Lynne Coy-Ogan, president of Husson University
- Joshua Crockett, president of Bob Jones University
- Thaddeus S. Lott Sr., educator
- Alex McFarland, director of Christian World View at North Greenville University
- Mary Jo Podgurski, adolescent sexuality & childbirth expert and professor at Washington and Jefferson College

=== Business, entrepreneurship, and philanthropy ===
- Tad Skylar Agoglia, founder of First Response Team of America
- Patrick Ayota, Ugandan businessman, deputy managing director of the National Social Security Fund of Uganda
- The Benham Brothers, real estate moguls
- Jurnee Carr, founder of Jurnee's Journey Foundation
- Doug Dalton, owner of FutureBars
- Hayden Davis, protagonist in the $Libra cryptocurrency scandal
- Lakeysha Hallmon, founder of the Village Market
- Erika Kirk, CEO of Turning Point USA and widow of Charlie Kirk
- Gabe Lyons, founder of the Fermi Project
- Johnnie Moore, Jr., CEO of the Kairos Company

=== Entertainment ===
- Patricia Abravanel, daughter of Silvio Santos; Brazilian TV producer and host
- Stephen Baldwin, actor
- Laurie Bartram, actress
- Joshua Broome, former adult actor turned pastor
- Gavin Casalegno, actor
- Jean Doumanian, television producer
- Tiffany Espensen, actress known for playing Piper on Nickelodeon's Bucket & Skinner's Epic Adventures
- Courtney Garrett, Miss Virginia
- Trent Garrett, actor and model
- Al Gross, broadcaster and host of National Countdown Show.
- Jen Hamilton, social media personality
- Victoria Henley, model who appeared on America's Next Top Model
- Regan Hutsell, 2027 Miss America winner
- Vic Mignogna, anime voice actor
- Sanaz Minaie, Iranian television chef and cookbook author
- Heidi Mueller, soap opera actress
- Nala Ray, former adult performer, social media personality, and activist
- Lindsley Register, actress, producer, and writer best known for her role as Laura on The Walking Dead and as Dharma on Six
- Sadie Robertson, member of Duck Dynasty, attended for one semester
- Richard Rossi, filmmaker, actor, and evangelist
- Phil Snyder, voice actor known for Disney's Jiminy Cricket

=== Government, law, public policy, and military ===
- Les Adams, Republican Virginia House of Delegates
- Kimberly Pope Adams, Democrat member of Virginia House of Delegates
- Christianné Allen, communications director for U.S. Representative Russ Fulcher; former communications director for Rudy Giuliani
- Mark Anderson, Republican Connecticut House of Representatives
- Donna Bahorich, former Chair of the Texas Board of Education and member of Texas Historical Commission
- Chuck Baldwin, Constitution Party presidential nominee in the 2008 US presidential election
- Allison Ball, Kentucky state treasurer
- Scott Baugh, Republican California State Assembly
- Rhondalee Braithwaite-Knowles, Turks and Caicos Islands attorney general
- Kevin Beary, former sheriff of Orange County, Florida
- Ken Borton, Republican Michigan House of Representatives
- Fernando Cabrera, Democrat council member in New York
- Jerry Carter, Republican North Carolina House of Representatives
- Richard Cebra, Republican Maine House of Representatives
- Lee Chatfield, Republican Speaker of the Michigan House of Representatives
- Mike Cherry, Republican Virginia House of Delegates
- Sheria Clarke, Democrat United States District Court for the District of South Carolina
- Joshua G. Cole, Democrat Virginia House of Delegates
- Jeff Coleman, Republican Pennsylvania House of Representatives
- Dondi E. Costin, major general, USAF, ret.; led the United States Air Force Chaplain Corps and served as Chief of Chaplains of the United States Air Force
- Matt Commons, Republican Indiana House of Representatives
- Dirk Deaton, Republican Missouri House of Representatives
- Robert F. Dees, major general, USA, ret.; vice director for operational plans and interoperability for the Department of Defense
- Chris Epps, former commissioner of the Mississippi Department of Corrections
- Mike Fleck, Republican Pennsylvania House of Representatives
- Ben Frederick, Republican former majority leader of Michigan House of Representatives
- Monty Fritts, Republican Tennessee House of Representatives
- Doug Gilliam, Republican South Carolina House of Representatives
- Bob Good, former Chair of the House Freedom Caucus and United States House of Representatives
- Kevin Grantham, Republican, former president of the Colorado Senate
- Daniel W. Greear, Republican West Virginia House of Delegates
- Jaime Greene, Republican Michigan House of Representatives
- Murray A. Hansen, brigadier general, National Guard
- Natalie Harp, Executive Assistant to the President of the United States
- Steve Johnson, Republican Michigan House of Representatives
- Daniel Johnston, Republican North Dakota House of Representatives
- Jack Jordan, Republican Indiana House of Representatives
- Janet Vestal Kelly, Republican, 16th Virginia Secretary of Health and Human Resources and former Secretary of the Commonwealth of Virginia
- Pete Kelly, Republican, president of the Alaska Senate
- Teresa King, first female commandant of the United States Army Drill Sergeant School in Fort Bragg
- Todd Kirby, Judge of the 14th Circuit Court of West Virginia
- Matt Krause, Republican Texas House of Representatives
- Joel Krautter, Republican Montana House of Representatives
- Tim Krieger, Republican Pennsylvania House of Representatives
- Ryan Lane, Republican New Mexico House of Representatives
- Leonardo Lightbourne, Bahamian politician from the Progressive Liberal Party
- Kevin Lincoln, Republican 88th Mayor of Stockton, California
- Jeffrie Long Jr., Democrat Maryland House of Delegates
- Eric Maguire, Republican Vermont House of Representatives
- Jean Elizabeth Manes, United States Ambassador to El Salvador
- Jonathan Martin, Republican Florida Senate
- Chad Mayes, Republican Minority Leader of the California Assembly
- Brett Miller, Republican Pennsylvania House of Representatives
- Tanya Mirabal Moya, Republican New Mexico House of Representatives
- Sherae'a Moore, Democrat member of the Delaware House of Representatives
- Penny Young Nance, CEO of Concerned Women for America
- Troy Nehls, Republican United States House of Representatives
- Joshua Nelson, Republican West Virginia House of Delegates
- Tom Newell, Chief of Staff to the Governor of Oklahoma
- John O'Neal, Republican West Virginia House of Delegates
- Reagan Paul, Republican Maine state legislator
- Tony Perkins, Republican Louisiana House of Representatives and president of the Family Research Council
- Mats Persson, director of Open Europe
- Elijah Pierick, Republican Hawaii House of Representatives
- Jena Powell, Republican Ohio House of Representatives
- Nate Schatzline, Republican Texas House of Representatives
- David A. Schauer, former executive director of National Council on Radiation Protection and Measurements
- Adrian Smith, Republican US congressman from Nebraska
- Eric Smith, Republican Kansas House of Representatives
- Jennifer Sullivan, Republican Florida House of Representatives
- Daniel Tamburello, former Acting Under Secretary of Homeland Security for Intelligence and Analysis and Acting Under Secretary of Homeland Security for Science and Technology
- Jeremy Taylor, Republican Iowa House of Representatives
- Jeffrey Thompson, Republican Idaho House of Representatives
- Wendell Walker, Republican Virginia House of Delegates
- Jackie Walorski, Republican United States House of Representatives
- Will Wampler, Republican Virginia House of Delegates
- T. K. Waters, 7th Sheriff of Jacksonville

=== Literature and journalism ===
- Shannon Bream, Fox News host
- Mike Bullock, author known for Lions, Tigers and Bears
- Jen Hamilton, social media influencer and best selling author
- Angela Elwell Hunt, Christian author
- Tim LaHaye, Christian author
- Jessica Moore, journalist at WCBS-TV
- Samantha Ponder, ESPN host
- Kevin Roose, reporter for The New York Times, attended for a semester

=== Music ===
- Meredith Andrews, contemporary Christian music singer
- Hector Cervantes, member of Casting Crowns
- Stephen Christian, lead singer for Anberlin
- Thad Cockrell, Christian country singer
- Anthony Evans, Jr., Christian singer-songwriter
- Terry Fator, singer and ventriloquist
- Chad Graham, member of Christian rock band Anthem Lights
- Caleb Grimm, member of the Christian rock band Anthem Lights
- Joy Hanna, christian musician
- Corey Horn, bassist for Christian rock band Remedy Drive
- Paris Jones, singer and rapper
- Kyle Kupecky, former member of the Christian rock band Anthem Lights
- Tim Lambesis, member of As I Lay Dying
- Joy Lippard, Contemporary Christian music singer
- The Lone Bellow, members Brian Elmquist and Zach Williams both attended in the early 2000s
- Mark Lowry, Christian singer and comedian
- Kevin Max, former member of Christian group Audio Adrenaline; former member of Christian rock band DC Talk
- Jody McBrayer, former singer for Christian group Avalon
- Nightbirde, former contestant on America's Got Talent
- Guy Penrod, former singer for gospel group Gaither Vocal Band
- Alan Powell, member of the Christian rock band Anthem Lights
- Lynda Randle, southern gospel singer
- Jon Schneck, member of Christian rock band Relient K
- Lacey Sturm, singer Flyleaf (band)
- Phil Stacey, contestant on the sixth season of American Idol
- Svrcina (singer), singer
- Michael Tait, lead singer for Christian group Newsboys; former member of DC Talk
- TobyMac, Christian hip hop artist; former member of DC Talk
- Shaun Tomczak, member of the band Sidewalk Prophets

=== Religion ===
- Jeff Bailey, bishop for the Diocese of Churches for the Sake of Others
- Bobby Brewer, pastor, author, and talk radio personality
- Charles Caldwell Ryrie, Christian theologian
- Jonathan Falwell, son of Jerry Falwell and senior pastor of Thomas Road Baptist Church
- William Franklin Graham IV, evangelist; grandson of Billy Graham
- Bill Keller, televangelist and host of Live Prayer
- Michael R. Licona, New Testament scholar and apologist and professor of theology
- Ed Stetzer, Christian author and missionary
- Chris Surber, pastor and author
- Benjamin Szumskyj, pronomian Christian scholar

=== Sports ===
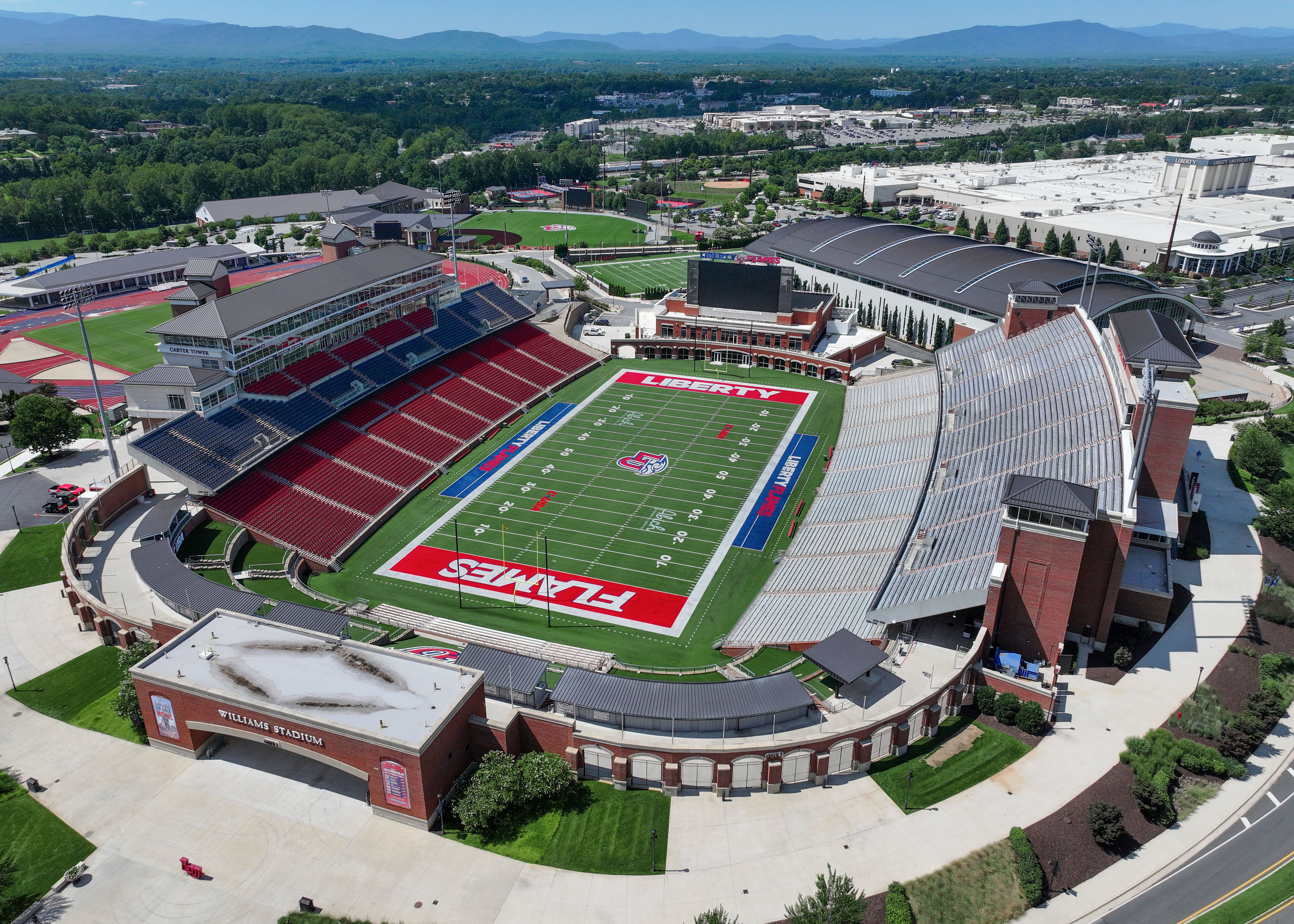
Liberty University Williams Stadium

==== Baseball ====
- Tony Beasley, third base coach for the Pittsburgh Pirates
- David Bote, former outfielder for Chicago Cubs; transferred out after one semester
- Doug Brady, former second baseman for the Chicago White Sox
- Sid Bream, former MLB first baseman
- Ryan Cordell, former MLB outfielder
- Rod Delmonico, former coach for the University of Tennessee and the Dutch national team
- Fraser Ellard, former pitcher for the Chicago White Sox
- Mason Fluharty, pitcher for the Toronto Blue Jays
- Trey Gibson, pitcher Baltimore Orioles
- Lee Guetterman, former MLB pitcher
- Ian Parmley, former outfielder for Toronto Blue Jays
- Noah Skirrow, former professional baseball pitcher
- Randy Tomlin, former pitching coach for the Harrisburg Senators
- Will Wagner, second baseman for the San Diego Padres

==== Basketball ====
- Peter Aluma, former center for the Nigerian national team
- Zach Cleveland, Conference USA Men's Basketball Player of the Year (2026)
- Seth Curry, NBA guard for the Golden State Warriors
- Octavio De La Grana, assistant coach and head scout for the Miami Heat
- Jason Dixon, former professional basketball player; Guangdong Southern Tigers retired his number 15
- Katie Feenstra-Mattera, former WNBA player, assistant coach of the Liberty Lady Flames basketball
- Megan Frazee, former forward for CCC Polkowice in Poland, former WNBA player
- Tomasz Gielo, forward for the Joventut Badalona and the Poland national basketball team
- Caleb Homesley, former player for the Washington Wizards and current player for the Bahçeşehir Koleji S.K.
- Scottie James, basketball player for Goyang Sono Skygunners
- Jeremy Luther, head coach of Gardner–Webb University
- Darius McGhee, guard for JL Bourg Basket
- Kelsey Mitchell (basketball), guard for the Indiana Fever
- Julius Nwosu, former NBA player
- Taelon Peter, former guard for the Indiana Pacers
- Jeri Porter, former head coach of the George Mason University women's team
- Jesse Sanders, former professional basketball player
- Andrew Smith, basketball player in the Israeli Basketball Premier League and member of the Latvia national basketball team
- Itoro Umoh-Coleman, former head coach of the Clemson University women's team
- Avery Warley-Talbert, former center for the Phoenix Mercury

==== Football ====
- Walt Aikens, former defensive back for the Miami Dolphins
- Daijahn Anthony, defensive back for the Cincinnati Bengals
- Fred Banks, former wide receiver for the Cleveland Browns, Miami Dolphins, and Chicago Bears
- Sebastian Barrie, former defensive end and tackle for the Green Bay Packers, Arizona Cardinals, and San Diego Chargers
- Elijah Benton, former defensive back for the Cleveland Browns
- Mike Brown, wide receivers coach for Notre Dame and former NFL wide receiver
- Charlie Brewer, former CFL quarterback
- John Cartwright, former Liberty coach
- Dwayne Carswell, former tight end and offensive lineman for the Denver Broncos
- Jim Catanzaro, Assistant vice-president for athletics & head coach at Lake Forest College
- Kei'Trel Clark, cornerback for Arizona Cardinals
- Steve Clark, former NFL player
- Quinton Cooley, CFL running back for the Winnipeg Blue Bombers
- CJ Daniels, receiver for the St. Louis Rams
- Demario Douglas, wide receiver for the New England Patriots
- Tony Dews, running backs coach for the New England Patriots
- Jack Easterby, former executive vice president of football operations for Houston Texans
- Kelvin Edwards, former wide receiver for the New Orleans Saints and Dallas Cowboys
- Jason Elam, former kicker for the Denver Broncos
- Marcus Floyd, former cornerback for the New York Jets, Buffalo Bills, and Carolina Panthers
- Kevin Fogg, former NFL and CFL player
- Nick Foles, former quarterback for the Philadelphia Eagles, Super Bowl LII MVP (did not play)
- Samkon Gado, former NFL running back
- Antonio Gandy-Golden, former wide receiver for the Washington Football Team
- Eric Green, former NFL tight end
- Wayne Haddix, former defensive end for the New York Giants, Tampa Bay Buccaneers, and Carolina Panthers
- Erick Harris, former NFL and arena football defensive end
- Frankie Hickson, CFL free agent
- Storey Jackson, professional football linebacker for San Antonio Brahmas
- Rashad Jennings, former NFL running back
- Dominique Jones, former tight end for the Indianapolis Colts
- Steve Kearns, former CFL Slotback
- Jennifer King, first black woman coach, assistant running backs coach for the Washington Football Team
- Matt Lambros, former CFL player
- Jessie Lemonier, former defensive end for the Los Angeles Chargers
- Mike Lucas, football coach for the University of Louisiana at Lafayette
- James McKnight, former wide receiver for the Seattle Seahawks, Dallas Cowboys, and Miami Dolphins; coach at Cypress Bay High School
- Vince Redd, former NFL player
- Stephen Sene, former offensive tackle for the New England Patriots
- Rocky Seto, former NFL coach
- Vic Shealy, former head coach at Houston Baptist University
- Richard Shelton, scout for the Tennessee Titans
- Johnny Shepherd, former running back for the Hamilton Tiger-Cats, Buffalo Bills, and New York Knights
- Donald Smith, former CFL cornerback and All-star
- Hunter Steward, offensive lineman for the BC Lions
- Chris Summers, former wide receiver for the Minnesota Vikings
- Paul Troth, former assistant football coach at ECU
- Malik Willis, quarterback for the Miami Dolphins
- Brian Witherspoon, former New York Giant
- Josh Woodrum, former NFL quarterback

==== Soccer ====
- Willie Bell, former coach and Leeds United forward
- Uriah Bentick, professional

defender and MLS draft pick

- Joshua Boateng, midfielder for AC Oulu in Finland
- Adrian Bumbut, former professional forward and coach
- Kyle Carr, professional soccer midfielder
- Coy Craft, midfielder for the FC Dallas
- Shalom Dutey, defender for the Charlotte Independence
- Gabrielle Farrell, forward for the Jamaica women's national football team
- Clarence Goodson, former member of the U.S. Men's National Team
- Jose Gomez, former professional midfielder and coach
- Juan Guzman, midfielder for the Charlotte Eagles
- Ben Johnson, former defender and coach
- Tresor Mbuyu, forward for the Charlotte Independence
- Kevin Mendoza, forward for the Tampa Bay Rowdies
- Darryl Roberts, striker for the Charlotte Eagles and the Trinidad and Tobago national team
- Osei Telesford, midfielder for the Puerto Rico Islanders and the Trinidad and Tobago national team
- Sly Tetteh, former president of Liberty Professionals in Ghana
- Ivy Younce, professional defender for the North Carolina Courage

==== Track and field ====
- Joaquín Ballivián, Chilean shot putter
- Sam Chelanga, professional runner
- Josh Cox, long-distance runner
- Jhon Perlaza, track and field olympian from Colombia

==== Other sports ====
- Michael Andrew, Olympic swimmer represents United States
- Marc-André Bourdon, former NHL defenseman for the Philadelphia Flyers
- William Byron, NASCAR driver
- Charles Fernandez, Olympic pentathlete that represents Guatemala
- Jonathan Healy, Olympic taekwondo athlete
- Paris-Gail Isaacs, field hockey player South Africa women's national field hockey team
- Anders Johnson (speed skater), speed skater for Canada
- Robert S. Karlsson, Swedish professional golfer
- Tuffield Latour, US men's bobsled coach
- Agueda Moroni, field hockey player Italy women's national field hockey team
- Rosa Mendes, former wrestler for the WWE
- Ntsopa Mokoena, field hockey player South Africa women's national field hockey team
- Deonna Purrazzo, All Elite Wrestling wrestler
- Elena Seiple, bodybuilder
- Kieran Vincent, Zimbabwean golfer and Asian Tour winner
- Debbie Yow, athletic director at North Carolina State University

== Faculty and staff ==
=== Administration ===
- Babbie Mason, School of Music Advisory Council member
- Jerry Prevo, former president of Liberty University
- Ricky Skaggs, School of Music Advisory Council member

=== Faculty ===
- Charles Billingsley, former worship leader at Thomas Road Baptist Church
- Jason Bohm, former United States Marine Major General
- James A. Borland, professor of philosophy and theology
- Dan Gordon, visiting professor of cinematic arts
- Tony L. Cothron, professor of government
- Gary Habermas, chairman of the department of philosophy and theology
- Michael S. Heiser, professor of theology
- Mark Horstemeyer, distinguished engineer professor
- Robert Hurt, former dean of the School of Law and Government
- Thomas Ice, former executive director of the Pre-Trib Research Center, associate professor of theology
- Karen Kingsbury, visiting professor of English (received Honorary Doctor of Letters in 2017)
- Phill Kline, professor of law
- Michael W. Smith, professor for Liberty School of music
- Randall Wallace, visiting professor of cinematic arts

=== Staff ===
- Jamey Chadwell, head football coach
- Carey Green, head women's basketball coach
- Ian McCaw, athletic director
- Ritchie McKay, head basketball coach
- Dot Richardson, head softball coach

== Honorary degree recipients ==
- Shannon Bream (Honorary Doctor of Law 2013), journalist on Fox News
- George H. W. Bush (Honorary Doctor of Humanities 1990), 41st president of the United States of America
- Jeb Bush (Honorary Doctor of Humanities 2015), 43rd governor of Florida
- Ben Carson (Honorary Doctor of Sciences 2018), neurosurgeon and United States Secretary of Housing and Urban Development
- Jimmy Carter (Honorary Doctor of Humanities 2018), 39th President of the United States
- S. Truett Cathy (Honorary Doctor of Humanities 2012), founder of Chick-fil-A
- Rashad Jennings (Honorary Doctor of Humanities 2016), New York Giants running back
- Jerry Johnston, founding pastor of the former First Family Church of Overland Park, Kansas; now vice president of Houston Baptist University
- Mike Lindell (Honorary Doctorate of Business 2019), founder and CEO of My Pillow, Inc
- Charlie Kirk (Honorary Doctor of Humanities 2019), activist and founder of Turning Point USA
- Chuck Norris (Honorary Doctor of Humanities 2008), actor
- Lacey E. Putney (Honorary Doctor of Humanities, 2014), former member of the Virginia House of Delegates
- Mitt Romney (Honorary Doctor of Humanities 2012), former governor of Massachusetts
- Tim Tebow (Honorary Doctor of Humanities 2021), former NFL player, philanthropist, and sports media broadcast analyst
- Donald Trump (Honorary Doctorate of Business 2012, Honorary Doctor of Laws 2017), 45th and 47th president of the United States
- Randall Wallace (Honorary Doctor of Humanities 2011), screenwriter known for Braveheart
