= List of people from Overland Park, Kansas =

The list of people from Overland Park, Kansas includes those who were born in or have lived in the city.

== Arts and entertainment ==
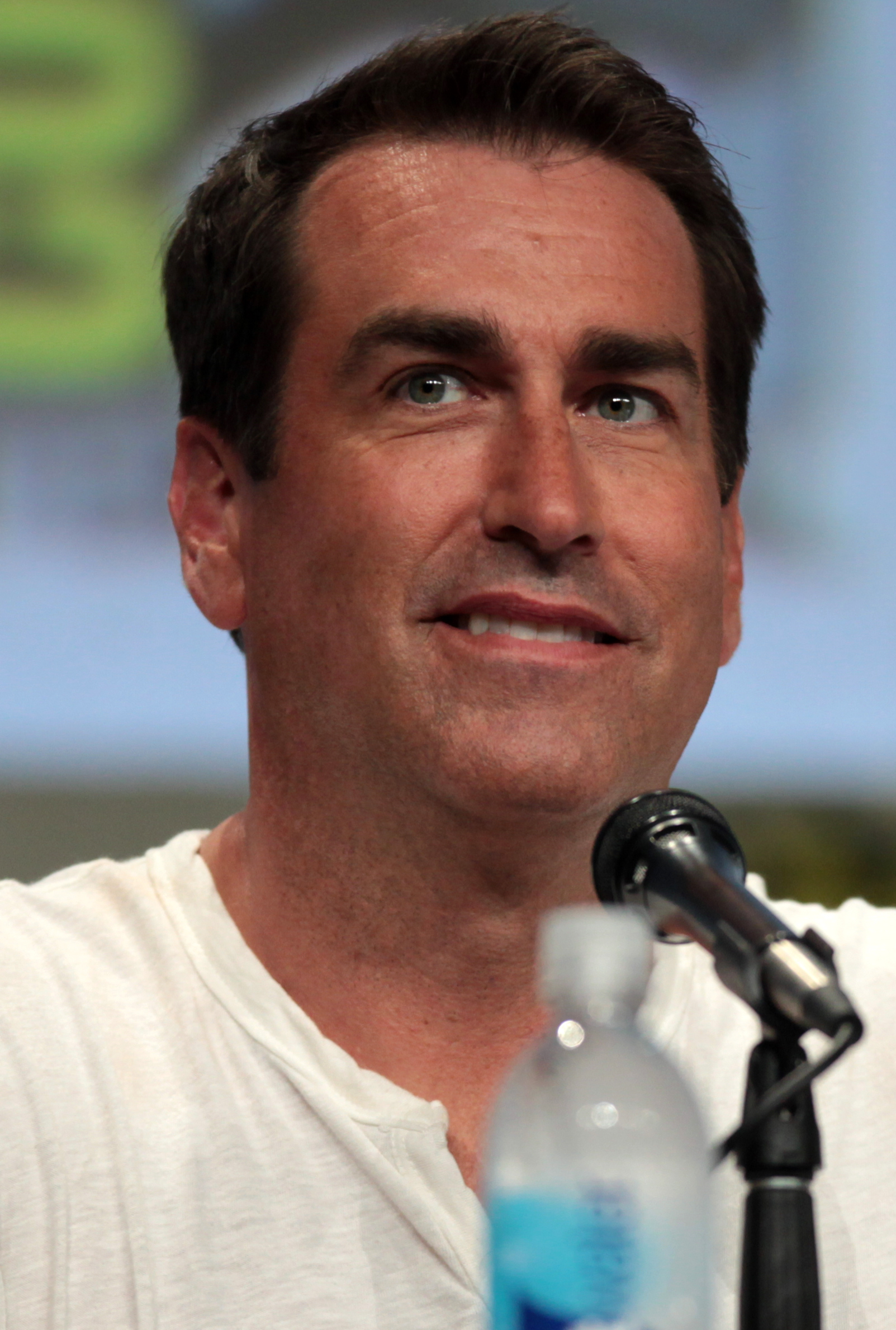
Rob Riggle

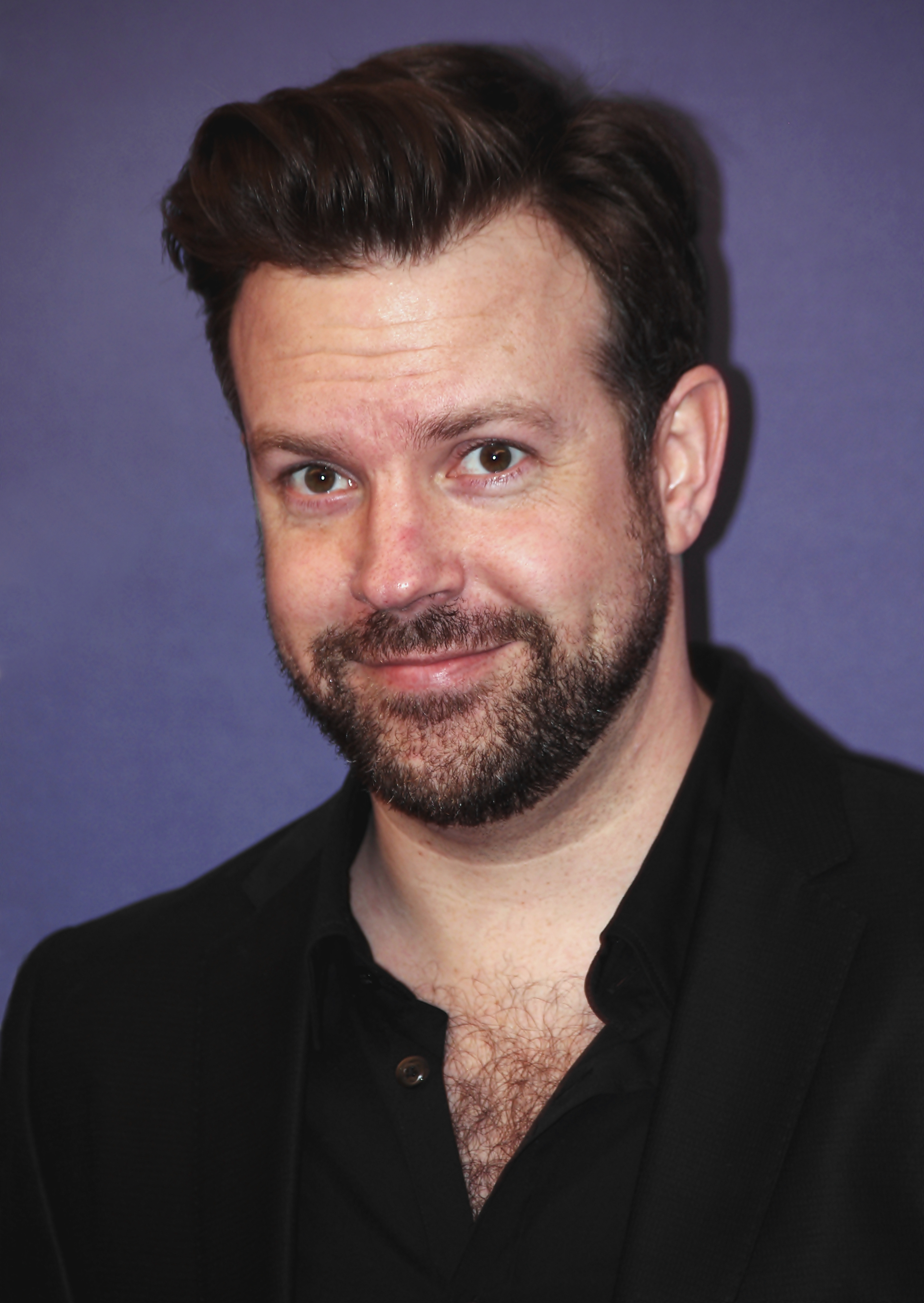
Jason Sudeikis

=== Beauty and fashion ===
- Deborah Bryant, Miss America 1966
- Lisa Forbes (1981– ), Miss Kansas USA 2004
- Tara Dawn Holland (1972– ), Miss America 1997

=== Film, television, and theater ===
- Michael Almereyda (1960– ), film director, screenwriter
- Darren Lynn Bousman (1979– ), film director, screenwriter
- David Dastmalchian (1975– ), actor
- Tom Kane (1962–2026), voice actor
- Sarah Lancaster (1980– ), actress
- John Lehr (1967– ), actor
- Rob Riggle (1970– ), actor, comedian
- Paul Rudd (1969– ), actor, screenwriter, director.
- Jason Sudeikis (1975– ), actor, comedian

=== Literature ===
- Kenan Orhan (1993– ), writer

=== Music ===
- Phillip Sandifer (1959– ), songwriter, recording artist
- Lajon Witherspoon (1972– ), lead singer of Sevendust

=== Other visual arts ===
- Elmo Gideon (1924–2010), painter, sculptor

== Business ==
- William B. Strang Jr. (1857–1921), railroad magnate, city founder
- Arash Ferdowsi (1985–), entrepreneur, co-founder of Dropbox

== Politics ==
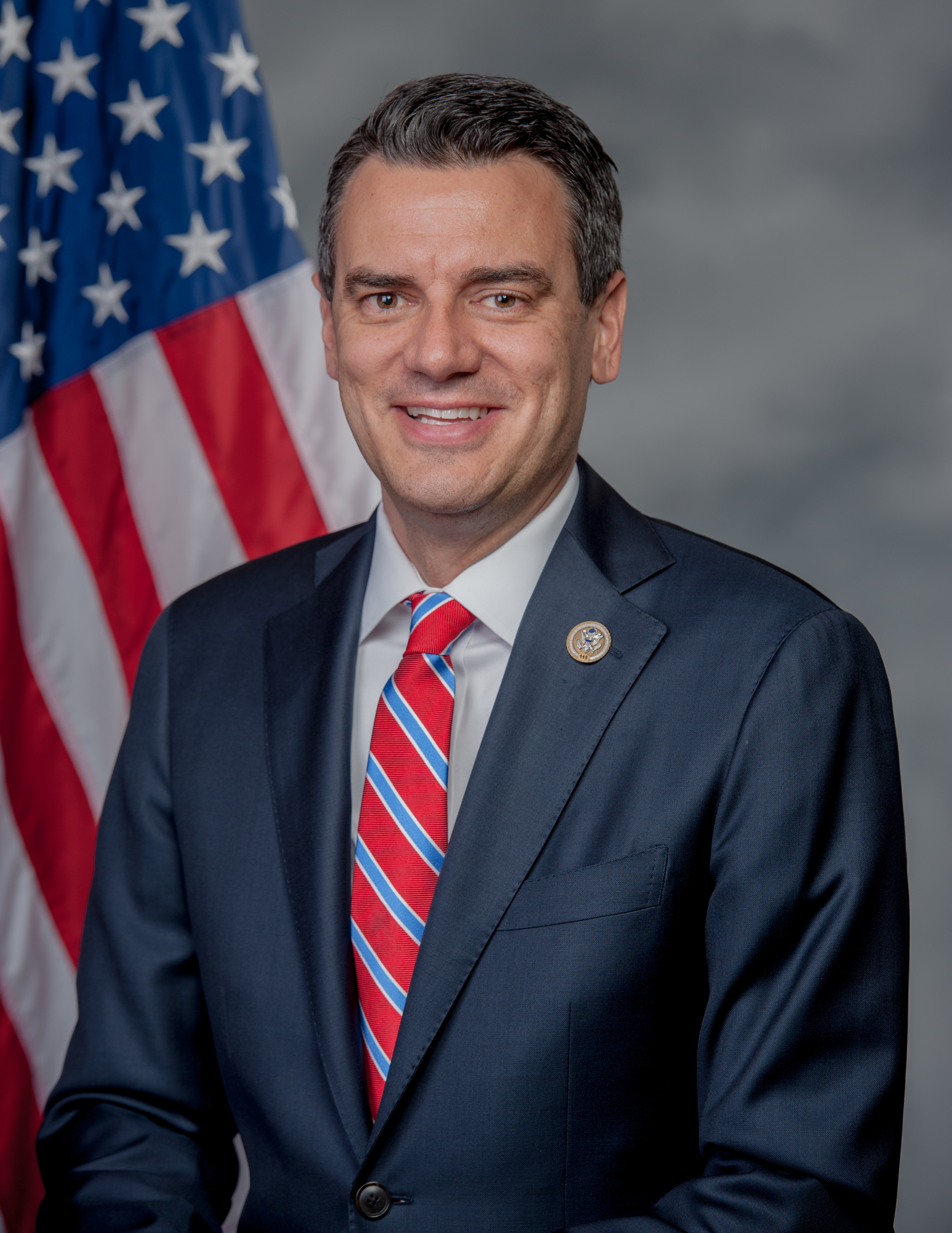
Kevin Yoder

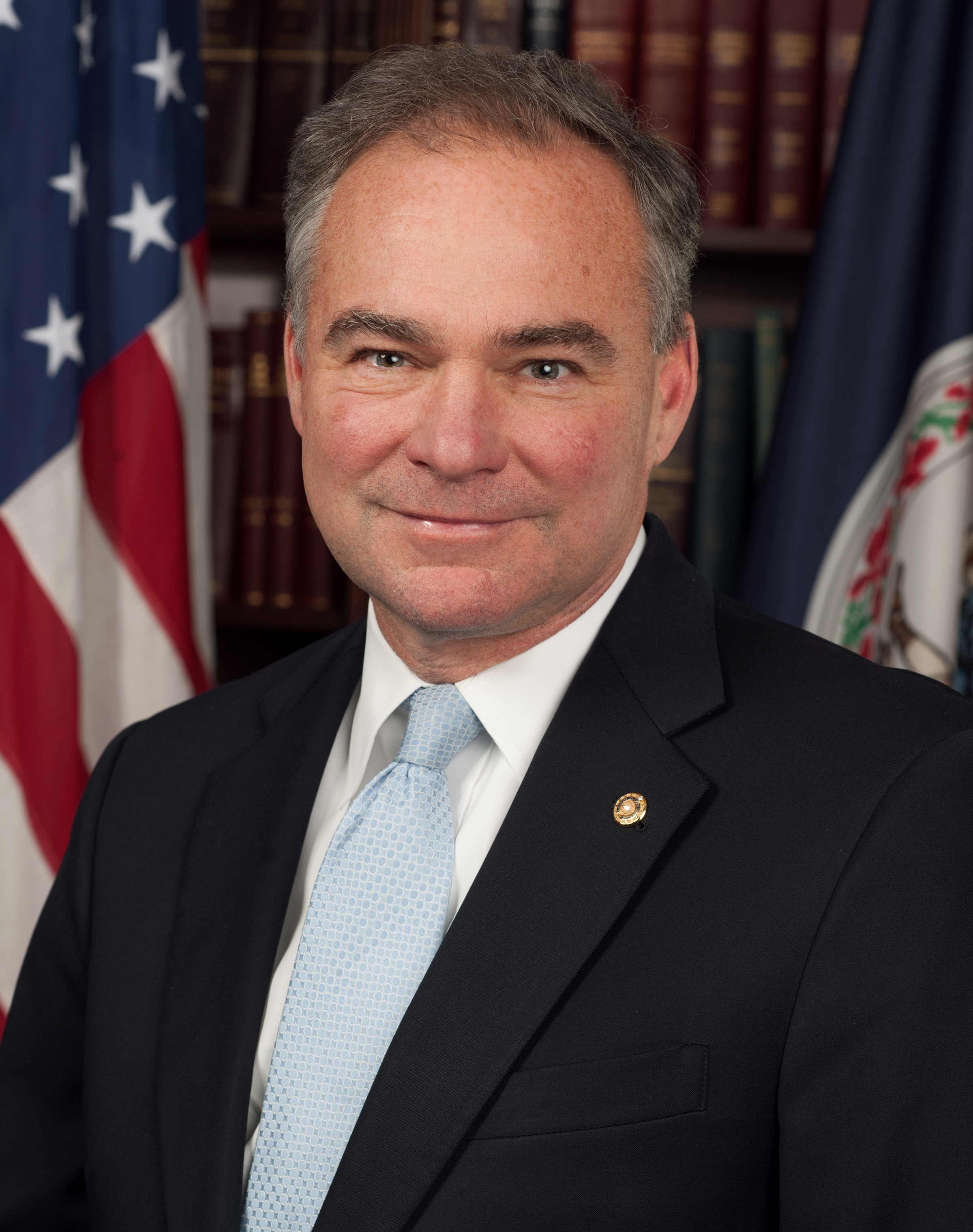
Tim Kaine

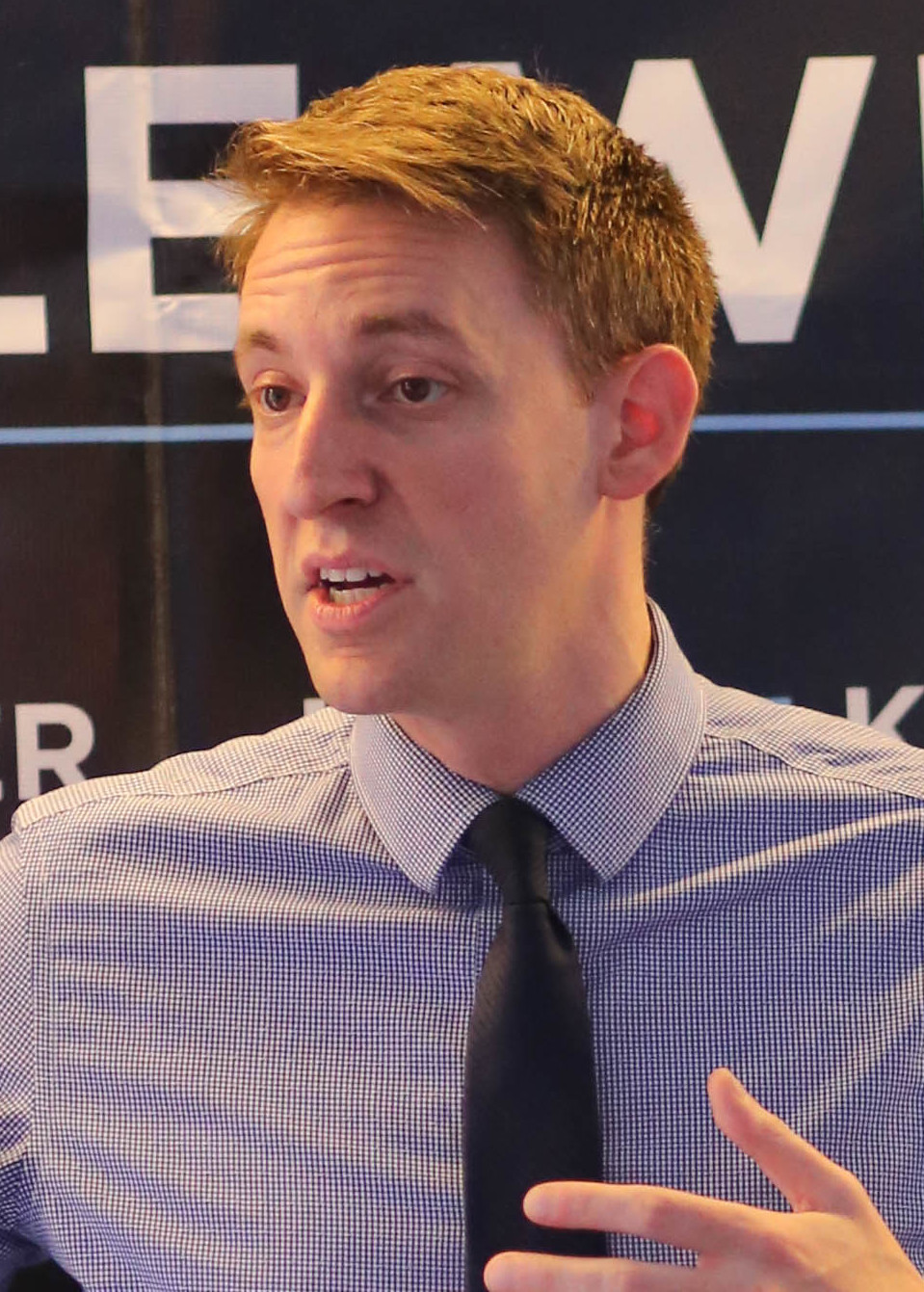
Jason Kander

- Jeff Colyer (1960– ), Governor of Kansas (2018–2019 ), 49th Lieutenant Governor of Kansas (2011–2018)
- Tim Kaine, United States Senator from Virginia, former Governor of Virginia and the Democratic Party's Vice Presidential nominee in the 2016 U.S. presidential election
- Jason Kander, Missouri Secretary of State (2013–2017)
- Kris Kobach (1966– ), Kansas Secretary of State (2011–2019)
- Harold Blaine Miller (1903–1992), U.S. Navy official, Eisenhower appointee, pilot, public relations executive, college administrator, and author
- Jan Meyers (1928–2019), U.S. Representative from Kansas (1985–1997)
- Bradley Schlozman (1971– ), U.S. Attorney
- Kevin Yoder (1976– ), U.S. Representative from Kansas (2011–2019)

== Religion ==
- James D. Conley (1955– ), Roman Catholic prelate
- Jerry Johnston (1959– ), Southern Baptist Convention evangelist; pastor from 1996 to 2011 of the former First Family Church in Overland Park; reared in Overland Park

== Sports ==
=== American football ===
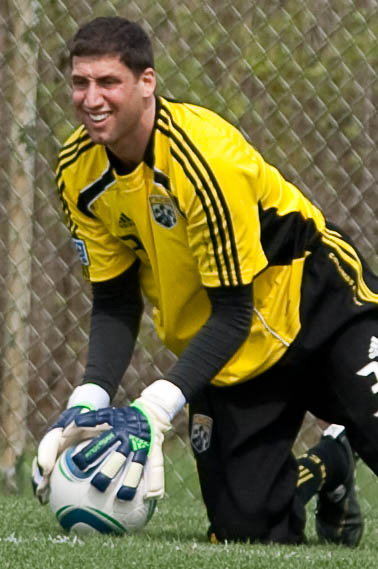
Andy Gruenebaum

- Andrew Gachkar (1988– ), linebacker
- Rudy Niswanger (1982– ), center
- Will Shields (1971– ), guard
- Lawrence Tynes (1978– ), placekicker
- Jeff Wolfert (1985– ), placekicker

=== Baseball ===
- Jason Adam (1991– ), pitcher
- Jason Grimsley (1967– ), pitcher
- Colton Murray (1990– ), pitcher
- Ryne Stanek (1991– ), pitcher
- Tom Burgmeier (1943– ), pitcher
- Mike Boddicker (1957– ), pitcher

=== Soccer ===
- Mo Abulnadi (2001– ), defender
- Matt Besler (1987– ), defender
- Nick Besler (1993– ), midfielder
- Andy Gruenebaum (1982– ), goalkeeper
- Will John (1985– ), forward and midfielder
- Haley McCutcheon (1996– ), midfielder and defender
- Peter Vermes (1966– ), midfielder and coach

=== Other sports ===
- Christie Ambrosi (1976– ), 2000 Olympic U.S. softball player
- Anna Glennon (1996– ), World Champion Jet Ski racer
- Tyler Kalinoski (1992– ), basketball player
- Tonya Knight (1966– ), IFBB professional bodybuilder
- Semi Ojeleye (1994– ), basketball player
- Jack Sock (1992– ), professional tennis player
- Johnathan Wendel (1981– ), former professional Quake and Painkiller player
- Leanne Wong (2003– ), artistic gymnast

== See also ==
- Lists of people from Kansas
- List of people from Johnson County, Kansas
