= Article VI =

Article VI may refer to:

- Article VI (film), a 2008 documentary film
- Article Six of the United States Constitution
- Article VI of the Thirty-Nine Articles – Of the sufficiency of the Holy Scriptures for Salvation
