= Agoglia =

Agoglia is a surname. Notable people with the surname include:

- Esmeralda Agoglia (1923–2014), Argentine ballet dancer and choreographer
- John Agoglia (1937–2014), American television executive
- Tad Skylar Agoglia (born 1976), American activist
