= Fermi Project =

The Fermi Project, based in Atlanta, Georgia, is a loose collective of Evangelical innovators, entrepreneurs, and faith leaders who pursue endeavors that advance Christian goals. It was founded by Gabe and Rebekah Lyons in 2003, and has no direct connection with the physicist Enrico Fermi.

Fermi's main influence is exerted in "Q" conferences, which invite world leaders from a variety of areas to share "ideas that create a better world." Conference presenters have included people like authors Donald Miller, Rob Bell, Scot McKnight and Rick Warren, model Jon Passavant, media personality Jeff Johnson and social entrepreneur Majora Carter.

Fermi and its projects have made national headlines when they asked Eboo Patel, a Muslim leader and thinker, to present to their ambitious Christian audience. Founder Gabe Lyons has also been interviewed about faith patterns amongst the young on national news programs such as CNN.

== Publications ==
The Fermi Project offers a paid subscription to Fermi Words, a digital magazine about faith and culture. They also collaborated to publish a recent best selling book, unChristian by Lyons and David Kinnaman of the Barna Group, which featured contributions from Christian thinkers like Jim Wallis, Margaret Feinberg, Mike Foster and Sarah Cunningham.

== Origin of name ==
A Fermi is an extremely small unit of length equal to one quadrillionth of a meter. It is named after Enrico Fermi, the Nobel Prize winner and physicist who produced the first controlled nuclear chain reaction. Lyons uses this name because they seek to use small, incremental changes to create a series of large changes in how the church views its mission.
