= Bill Keller (televangelist) =

American televangelist

- Born: February 18, 1958 (age 68); Columbus, Ohio
- Occupation: Televangelist
- Known for: Live Prayer
- Spouse: Nan Keller

William Herbert Keller (born February 18, 1958, in Columbus, Ohio) is an American television evangelist and the host of Christian evangelical Internet and television ministry Live Prayer.

== Biography ==
=== Early life ===
Keller was born in Columbus, Ohio, raised in the United Methodist Church, and has identified himself as an evangelical Christian since the age of 12. Keller worked through high school to save for his post-secondary education because his father—who had owned a Standard Oil gas station—died when he was only 16. Keller went to Ohio State University for three years with the goal of becoming a Christian minister. While at Ohio State however, Keller began a successful computer sales business. After earning millions of dollars, Keller was convicted of insider trading and spent nearly three years in prison.

During his time in prison, Keller attended Jerry Falwell's Liberty University through its distance learning program. Keller earned a B.S. in General Studies with concentrations in Biblical studies and journalism.

=== Live Prayer ===
In August 1999, Keller began writing material for a ministry show he planned on starting. The Live Prayer television program debuted in March 2003. Sponsorship of the program fluctuated during the programs run which affected syndication of the show. During most of the shows run, it aired in the Tampa Bay market but enjoyed nationwide syndication for a time due to available funds. Currently, Live Prayer is broadcast online through the show's official website and on television in numerous different markets, including New York City and Chicago. The website features archives of the most recent shows as well as links to other media. Keller also writes a "daily devotional" each day which can be read or listened to. The daily devotional offers Keller's interpretation of the bible in the context of coping with life challenges.

=== Howard Stern Show appearance ===
Keller has been on The Howard Stern Show three times. He first appeared on March 1, 2007, for a short appearance where he discussed his history and beliefs. He appeared twice more for two one-hour Live Prayer specials on Howard 101 on March 26, 2007, and April 1, 2007. While on the show he counseled wack packers (including "Jeff the drunk", for whom Keller offered to find work as a carpenter's apprentice) and took live phone calls.

=== Ground Zero Christian center ===
Following the controversy surrounding the Park51 Islamic community center and mosque near Ground Zero, Keller announced his intention to set up a Christian center near the site in order to "combat this new evil being constructed near ground zero".

=== 2012 presidential election ===
In 2012, Keller set up a website encouraging Christians to cast a write-in vote for Jesus Christ in the 2012 presidential elections instead of voting for either Barack Obama or Mitt Romney, comparing the choice between the two to "flipping a coin where Satan is on both sides". As of October 24, Keller had over 1.3 million pledges. Keller said in an e-mail that Romney is a "Baal worshiper", that Mormonism is a Satanic cult, and that any Christian who supports a Mormon for president is selling their soul.

=== Opposition to Islam ===
Keller is also openly critical of Islam. In September 2012, following a wave of protests and attacks in the Middle East, Keller sent a letter to recently elected Egyptian president Mohamed Morsi, saying that he was ready to stand trial and face the death penalty in Egypt for insulting Islam. He described Islam as "a 1,400-year-old lie from hell" and called the prophet Mohammed a pedophile, polygamist and murderer who was Satanically inspired. Egypt had previously called on the United Nations to adopt a global blasphemy law and had issued arrest warrants for the makers of the controversial anti-Islam film Innocence of Muslims, which had sparked the turmoil.

Keller says that 15 fatwas have been issued against him and that he "can't even step foot [sic] in countries like Saudi Arabia and Egypt". He has also said he receives eight or nine death threats every month. Keller's ministry has been listed as a "general hate" hate group by the Southern Poverty Law Center, a characterization he has threatened to sue the SPLC for $100 million over.

== Public statements ==
Keller was interviewed and featured in the documentary film Article VI: Faith.Politics.America. In the film he is shown saying that he likes Mitt Romney, but that he is a member of the Church of Jesus Christ of Latter-day Saints and "following a false theology straight to hell". He also says Islam is a religion of violence and condemns the Park51 project in Manhattan.

Keller used the suicide of Jamie Hubley, a gay 15-year-old from Ottawa, to criticize homosexuality. Keller has, however, also stated that homosexuality is no more of a sin than gluttony, and has said that obese Christians and pastors who don't preach about gluttony are hypocrites.

Keller has criticized both mainstream preachers such as Joel Osteen, whom he calls a "theological midget", and extreme ones such as Fred Phelps and Terry Jones, who he said say some things he agrees with about problems with society, but aren't doing anything to help.

== See also ==
- List of American televangelists
