= Nala Ray =

American social media influencer and activist

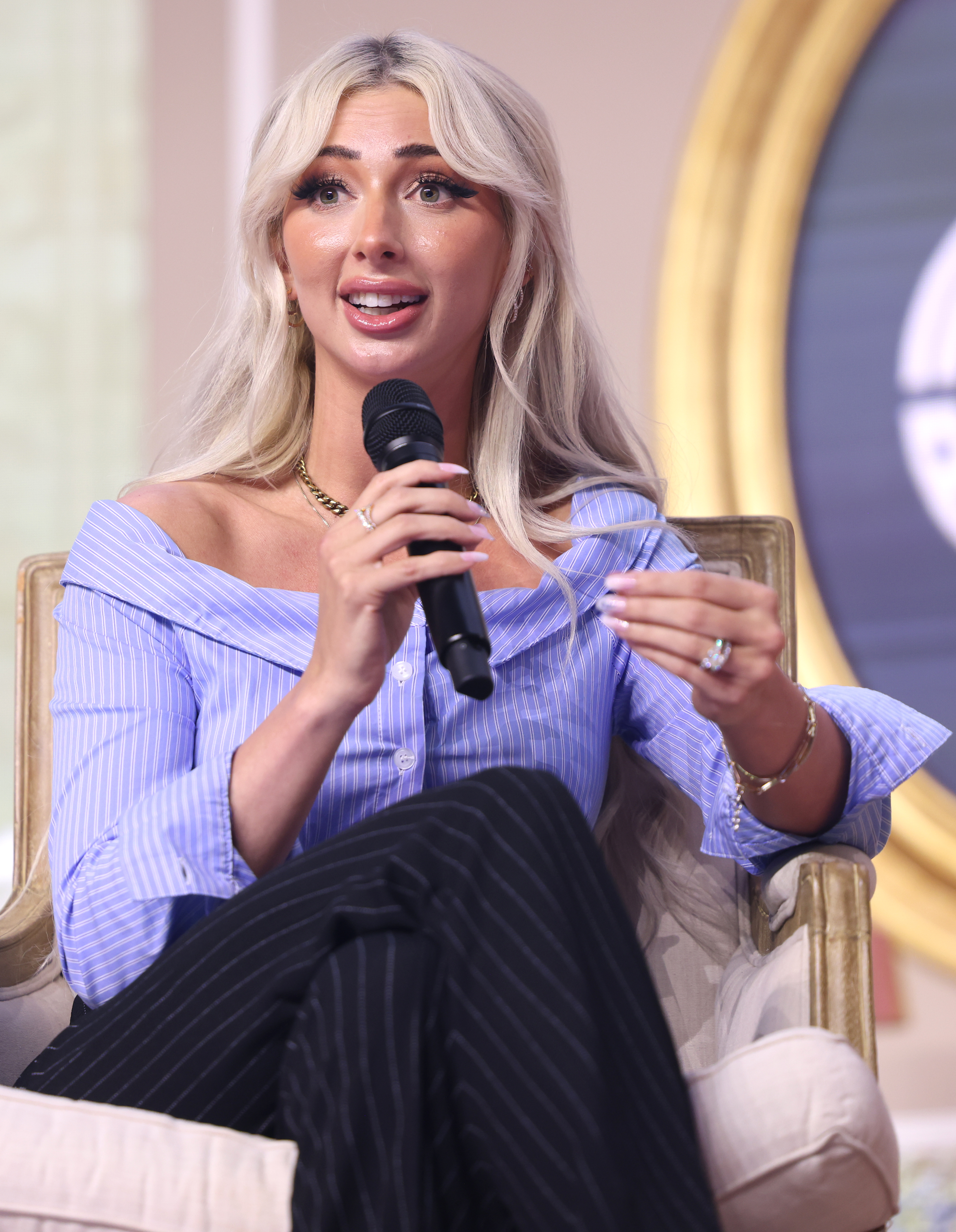
- Ray in 2025
- Born: 1997 (age 28–29); Decatur, Illinois, US
- Occupations: Christian activist, social media influencer
- Spouse: Jordan Giordano (m. 2024)

Instagram information
- Page: fitness_nala
- Years active: January 2016–present
- Followers: 1.7M

TikTok information
- Pages: NalaRay; naladaddyy
- Followers: 732.4K

X information
- Handle: @FitNalaRayy
- Years active: April 2024–present
- Followers: 6,264

YouTube information
- Channel: The NalaRay Show
- Subscribers: 4.21K
- Last updated: February 5, 2026

Nala Ray is an American social media influencer, Christian activist, cosplayer, and former pornographic content creator.

Ray was raised in a conservative Christian household as the daughter of a Baptist pastor. She says she had a troubled childhood, including a period of sexual abuse by a family guest, and began to see religion as a cage.

As a teenager, Ray rebelled against her strict religious upbringing. When she gained independence, she began posting fitness content on Instagram, then achieved broader recognition when she joined OnlyFans in 2020, at first posting nudity and erotica, then hardcore pornography. Ray became skilled at posting content that would attract attention, and became one of the OnlyFans platform's highest-earning creators, reporting income of millions of dollars annually, but was disowned by her family, and had to resort to drugs to get through some of her shoots.

In 2023, Ray encountered Christian social media influencer Jordan Giordano, who she says inspired her to return to Christianity. Within months, Ray had left OnlyFans, deleted her erotic content, and reoriented her online presence towards faith-based content. Ray and Giordano married in 2024 and have appeared prominently in American Christian media. Some Christians welcomed Ray's conversion, while others have been skeptical and rejected her conversion as an attention-seeking sham.

== Early life ==
Ray was born in 1997 in Decatur, Illinois, the middle child of five siblings. She was first baptized when she was seven years old. When Ray was a child and living with her family in Billings, Missouri, they lost everything to a tornado. After the tornado, her father cheated on and divorced her mother, and left the family for two years. When Ray was 13 years old, her father returned, became a Baptist pastor, and her parents remarried to live in Illinois.

Ray says that as a pastor's child, she was expected to set an example for the community. She and her siblings were homeschooled, read the Bible daily, weren't allowed to wear makeup or provocative clothing, be on social media, or date. She says she felt that religion was a cage.

Ray's father's term as a pastor was troubled; they moved often as in-fighting forced him out of three different congregations, and eventually purchased a mold-ridden building to found his own church. In one of their homes, her father let a homeless 16-year-old boy live with them. Ray says the boy molested her for months while she was 13 before he ran away.

In 2015, Ray's family sold their final church and moved to Florida. Ray began to date boys and turn away from her strict religious upbringing. When Ray turned 18, she quit community college to work as a medical assistant, (Note: The Daily Mirror says "dental hygiene assistant"; Fox News says "orthopedic surgery scheduler"; USA Today says "for an orthopedics company"; Religion News Service says "secretary at a surgeon's office".) and started posting fitness modeling images on her Instagram account, Fitness Nala. She used Nala Ray as her stage name on social media. In 2019, an OnlyFans recruiter sent her an Instagram suggestion that she would do well there. (Note: USA Today says "around age 20", her Fox Radio interview says "the start of like 2019", The Daily Mirror says "At the end of 2019", Religion News Service says "in 2020".)

== OnlyFans ==
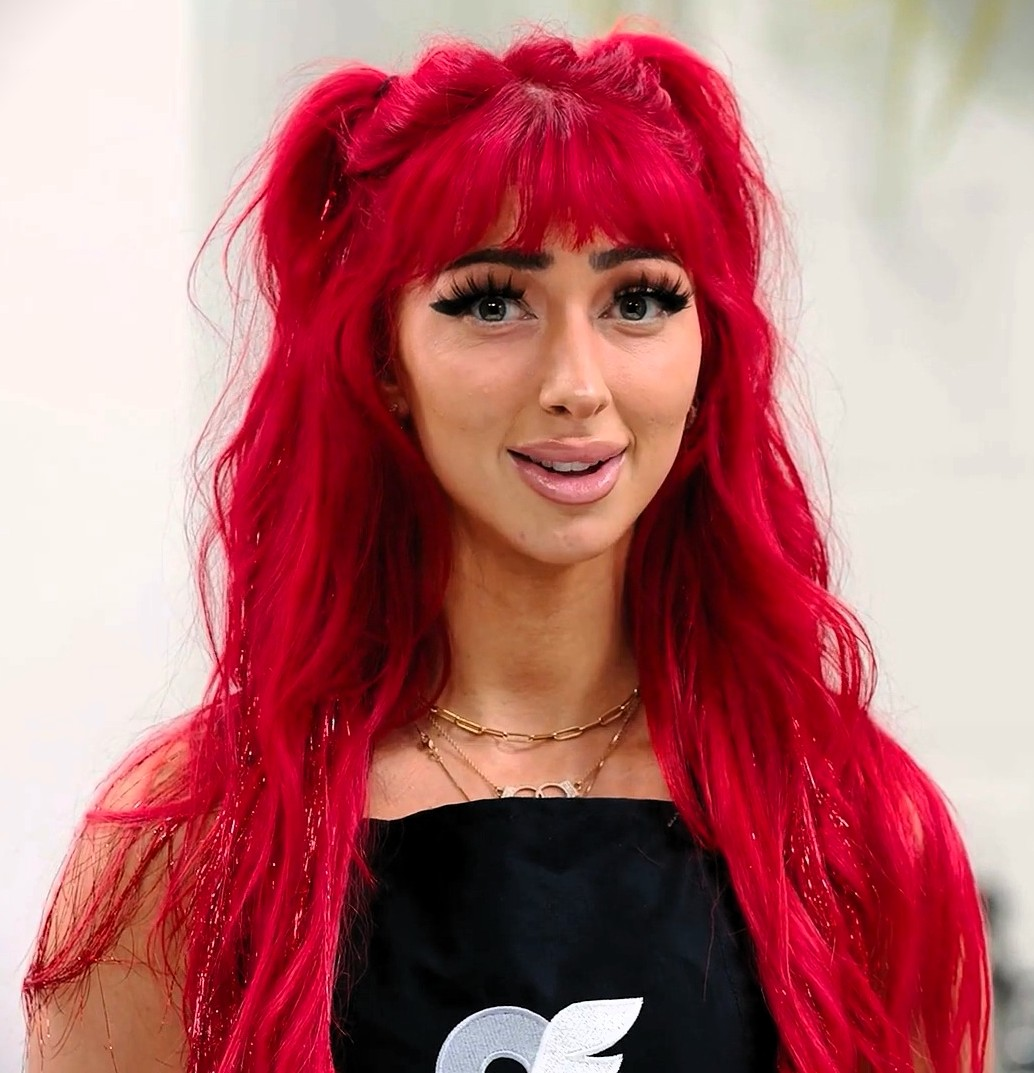
Ray on an OnlyFans creator cooking competition in 2023

When Ray joined OnlyFans in February 2020, the website was experiencing a boom due to the stay-at-home restrictions of the COVID-19 pandemic. She was one of the platform's first providers of sexually explicit content to paying subscribers, and earned $87,000 her first month.

Ray's specialty was gaming, anime, and cosplay; she put on costumes, makeup, and contacts so she could portray multiple characters. She put sexual but not explicit content in her channels on TikTok and Instagram, and in the video games she streamed on Twitch, which would lead people to her OnlyFans. For the first months Ray restricted her OnlyFans content to nudity and erotic talk, but says she still thought she could earn a million dollars a year. Ray says her parents disowned her and she stopped speaking to her siblings. She moved to Los Angeles and began doing hardcore pornography in 2021.

Ray hired a manager, read books on men's psychology, studied porn trends, and made outrageous statements to attempt to go viral and attract subscribers to her site. In 2023, Ray said her OnlyFans account earned her $300,000 per month. She said her 7000 online "boyfriends" were the reasons she did not date offline, as physical boyfriends would be intimidated by her money and production of sexually explicit content.

Ray estimates that she earned $14 million over her five years on OnlyFans, though the website took 20% and her manager another 40–45%. She won an award for being one of OnlyFans' top earning creators. She lived in a $4.3 million California home with a heated pool, drove luxury cars, and outfitted her dogs with designer collars. She says she numbed herself with alcohol and marijuana to get through the toughest filming days.

In September 2023, Ray encountered Jordan Giordano, a US Air Force veteran who was running a live stream on TikTok. She supported him with virtual gifts to help him win a live battle. (Note: A real-time contest between TikTok streamers for most viewer gifts in five minutes.) They began a relationship while she was in California and he was in Virginia. When she told him about her OnlyFans career, she expected him to be repelled, but he was not. Ray says her conversations with Giordano eventually led her to return to Christianity.

== Christianity ==
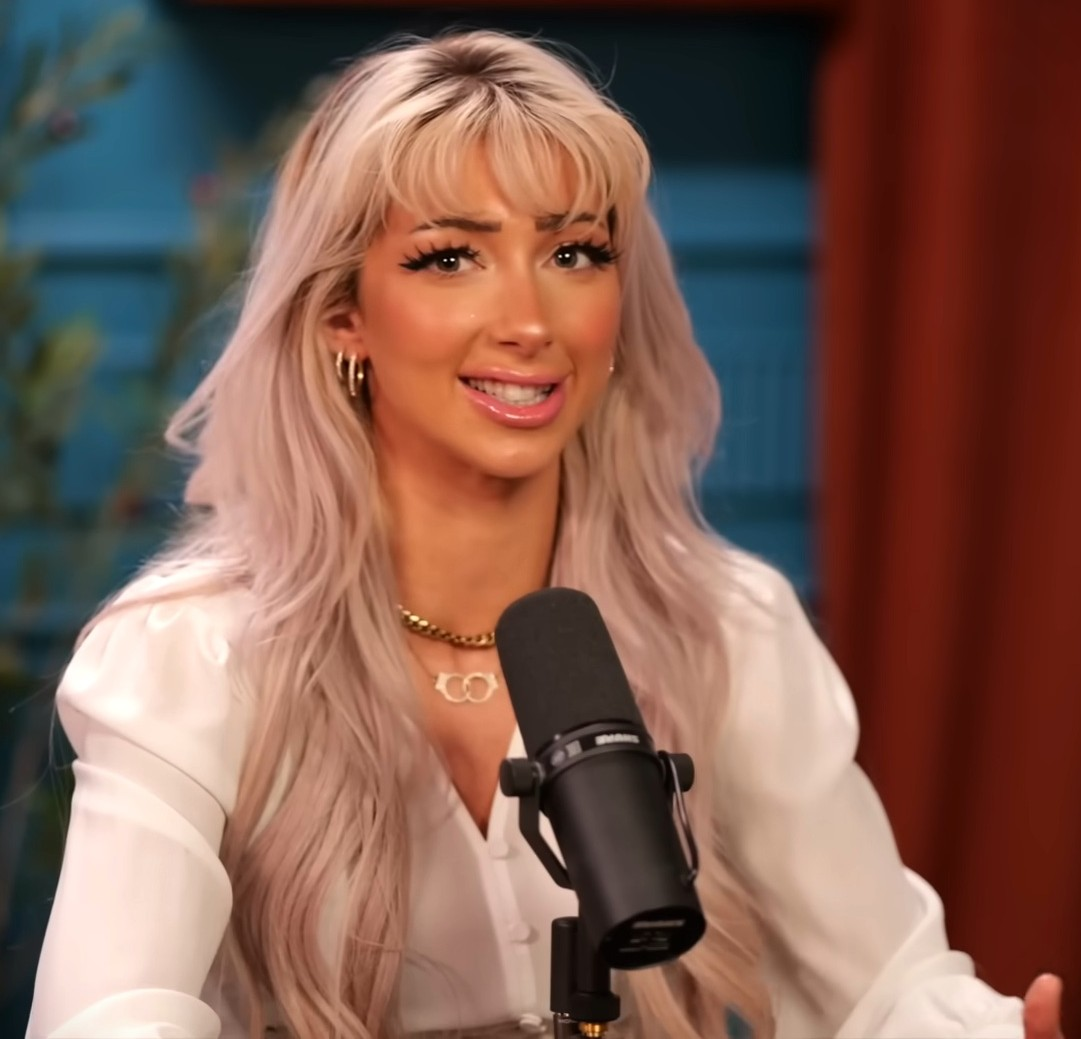
Ray in April 2025

Ray was baptized again in December 2023, at Fearless Church in Los Angeles. The video she posted of the event received 8.1 million views on Instagram, and over 4 million views on TikTok, but also user comments saying she was "beyond saving".

Ray credits Giordano's mother with helping her make the decision to quit OnlyFans. She says her OnlyFans manager told her she would not be able to survive without the money from the site, and even her father told her to stay on the platform for another year and a half; she had been giving her father money for two years. Ray quit OnlyFans in January 2024, and married Giordano on March 31, 2024, on Easter weekend. The couple moved to Nashville, Tennessee. By March 2024, Ray got rid of 13 bags of clothing she now called immodest, and her OnlyFans site remained with only a single post on it, a Christian video she made to hold the account open so she could retrieve the records for tax purposes. She kept her Instagram and TikTok channels, with audiences of 1.4 million and 730,000 respectively, which increased since she left OnlyFans, and in January 2026 started a podcast on her YouTube channel, "The Nala Ray Show", intended to focus on Christianity and other OnlyFans models.

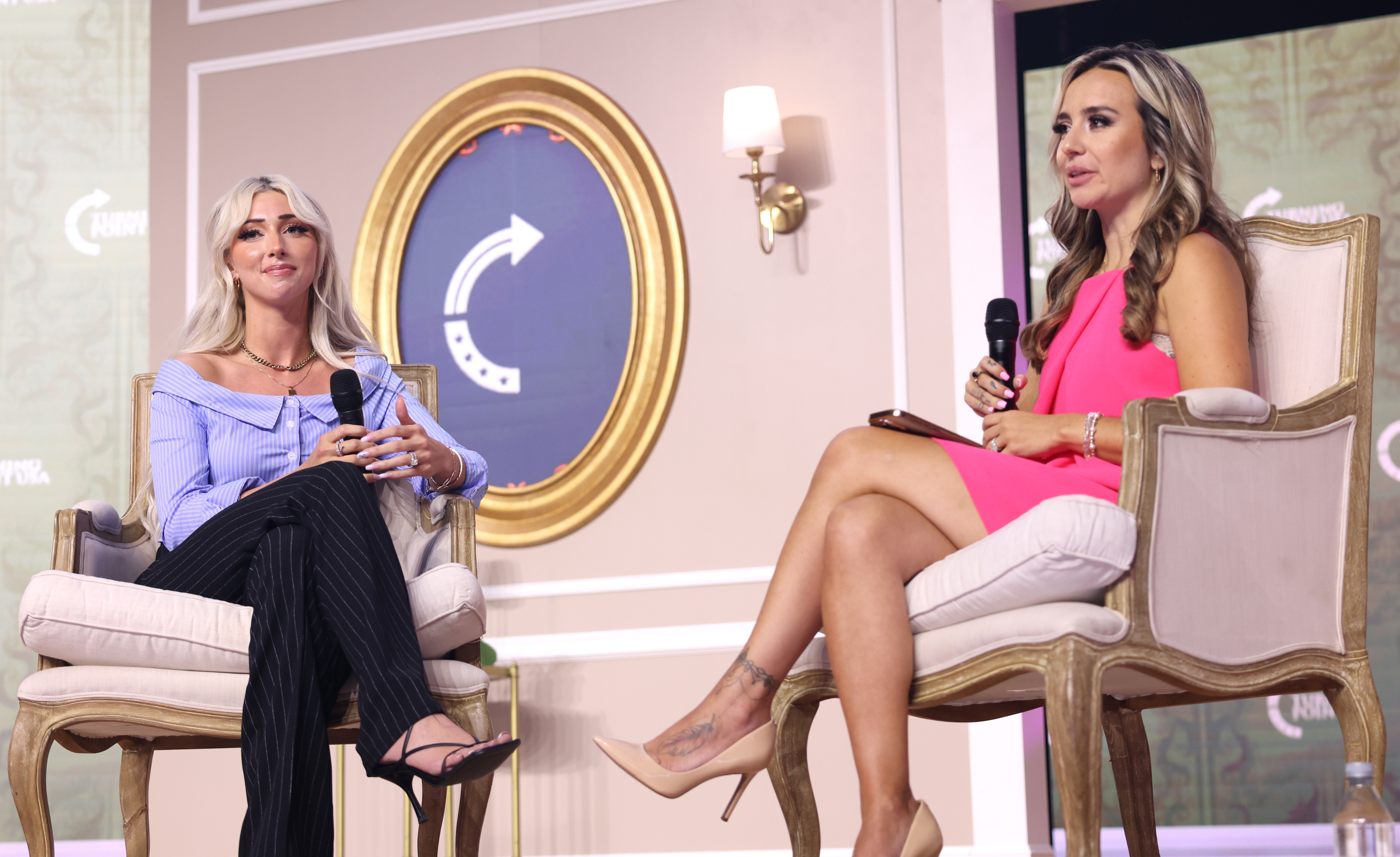
Ray (left) speaks with Monica Paige Luisi at the June 2025 Turning Point USA Young Women's Leadership Summit.

After leaving OnlyFans, Ray was interviewed at length on prominent American conservative and Christian media, including by Michael Knowles in April 2024 and February 2025, Lecrae in November 2024, and Charlie Kirk in June 2025.

However, Ray's return to Christianity was not universally welcomed by Christians, some of whom called her a grifter and her faith a sham. Ray responded to some of them who, she says, demanded that she return all the money she earned from OnlyFans, and stop coloring her hair, and wearing makeup and false eyelashes, by saying that God does not require that, only that she accept Christ, repent, and turn from her previous ways. Prominent among her critics was YouTube commentator Hannah Pearl Davis, who posted multiple videos since 2024 accusing Ray of seeking attention with her conversion, and said she was obsessed with proving it not real. Ray reiterated that she had been "radically saved" and said that she would be praying for Davis. In February 2025, Davis displayed legal papers from lawyers representing Ray accusing her of posting false, destructive and defamatory content online; Davis said that she would not delete anything.

Ray's brother died by suicide in July 2025, and in October 2025 her father was sentenced to 20 years in Florida prison for assault and battery after he broke into her mother's house with a knife and gun.
