= Stephen Sene =

American football player (born 1983)

No. 64
- Position: Offensive tackle

Personal information
- Born: October 9, 1983 (age 43); Columbia, South Carolina
- Listed height: 6 ft 5 in (1.96 m)
- Listed weight: 310 lb (141 kg)

Career information
- High school: Dutch Fork (Irmo, South Carolina)
- College: Liberty
- NFL draft: 2008: undrafted

Career history
- St. Louis Rams (2008)*; New England Patriots (2008-2009); Alabama Vipers (2010); Georgia Force (2011); Knoxville Nighthawks (2013)
- * Offseason or practice squad member only

Stephen Sene (born October 9, 1983 in Columbia, South Carolina) is an American former football offensive tackle for the New England Patriots of the National Football League. He was originally signed by the St. Louis Rams as an undrafted free agent in 2008. He started his collegiate career at the University of South Carolina, but finished playing college football at Liberty University. Stephen was selected to play in the 2008 Hula Bowl in Honolulu, HI.
