= Live Prayer =

- Genre: Religious broadcasting
- Starring: Bill Keller
- Theme music composer: Javen
- Opening theme: "Hope for You"
- Country of origin: United States
- Original language: English
- No. of episodes: over 1175

Production
- Executive producer: Bill Keller
- Producer: Rich Nation
- Camera setup: Steven Campbell
- Running time: 30 minutes (WXPX); 1 hour (all others)

Original release
- Network: WTOG 44 (2003-2007) i (2006; nationally); WTTA 38 (2007); WXPX 66 (2007); Internet only (2008 - present); WJYS (2013 - 2016); YouTube & Roku (2018 - present)
- Release: March 3, 2003

Live Prayer is a Christian evangelical Internet and television ministry located in Tampa, Florida, founded and operated by Bill Keller.

The ministry began in 1999 as a website featuring a daily devotional written by Keller and offers to accept and pray over emails, later expanding into a daily TV show on March 3, 2003. Live Prayer was broadcast nationally in the United States from July 3, 2006 through November 2006 on ION Television. At the end of that period, the ministry was financially unable to continue purchasing national airtime and returned to the Florida market.

In 2013, Keller obtained enough funding to continue the program on several major city markets, including Chicago, and, by 2015, managed to secure airtime on forty-nine of the fifty U.S. states, with all but Hawaii broadcasting his nightly program. However, after further financial difficulties in late 2016, the ministry's live program was put on hiatus before being entirely cancelled due to a lack of funding in November 2016.

However, on November 26, 2018, over two years after the cancellation of his TV program, Keller debuted the new LivePrayer program on various social media websites and streaming services.

== Television show ==
The Live Prayer television program began March 3, 2003 as a late-night show on WTOG where Bill Keller discussed current events from in relation to the ministry's theology and took phone calls. Callers would mostly ask Keller to pray with them over specific issues in their lives, occasionally contributing testimony of religious experience and their comments on scripture. Keller would sometimes encourage his opponents to call in and debate with him on contentions issues such as evolution, abortion, and homosexuality. Each episode ended with Keller inviting viewers to "accept Jesus" and recite a sinner's prayer with him.

Starting July 2006, the show was seen nationwide on i (Now Ion Television), however this ended in November when Keller could not raise enough money to pay the significantly higher airtime fees. Live Prayer was, up until this point, shown without advertising and paid for entirely by donations. However, near the end of his time on i, Keller began showing a limited number of ads from companies promoting gold investment schemes. Keller made a point of criticizing other televangelists for continually begging for money and misappropriating the donations they received. Keller also made his personal financial records available to reporters on request and informed viewers that his studio was austerely located on the donated grounds of a used car lot. After leaving ION, the show returned to its more economical spot on WTOG.

On August 31, 2007, after 1,175 episodes and nearly 5 years, Live Prayer was pulled from WTOG after complaints from the Council on American-Islamic Relations, after Keller made remarks on the show describing Muhammad as a "murdering pedophile", and considering Islam to be a "1,400-year-old lie from the pits of hell." On September 3, 2007, the show would move to WTTA under the title Live Prayer AM, airing from 7:30 am to 8:30 am.

In early November 2007, because WTTA suddenly changed its policy regarding live call-in shows, the show moved to local ION station WXPX; while still seen at 7:30 a.m. the show was cut to a half-hour. The morning show featured more guests as well as live shots from Florida attractions. The show featured a small number of ads, mostly for consumer mail-order items, but still relied heavily on donations.

On November 19, 2007, Keller announced that he was suspending his television program after the telecast on Friday, November 23, after officials from ION told Keller that it will no longer carry live programming. The ministry shows on public records that the income is about $500,000 a year gross, of which is claimed to have most of the money spent on internet band width. Keller made plans to revive the show on his website as an Internet-only live call-in broadcast in January 2008.

In 2013, Keller resumed a live broadcast of the show on Television and continued to broadcast Monday through Friday in markets such as New York City and Chicago. The show continued into 2016, peaking with over forty-nine markets carrying the program well into 2016 until a lack of funding forced Keller to cease broadcast yet again in November 2016.

However, on November 26, 2018, over two years after the cancellation of his TV program, Keller debuted the new LivePrayer program on various social media websites, such as YouTube and Facebook, and streaming services, such as Roku and Apple TV. The program runs weeknights from 11pm to midnight ET.

== Website ==
The LivePrayer.com website

=== Daily devotional ===
In August 1999, Keller began writing the Live Prayer Daily Devotional which he has continued to write everyday since. The devotional is now emailed to over 2,400,000 people around the world. The Live Prayer Daily Devotional is also available on the website, in both written and audio form, as well as for cellphone users via WAP and in audio form over the phone.

=== Internet simulcast & show archive ===
The Live Prayer television program was also broadcast live on the website. When the television program was not live, a feed from a webcam showing the Live Prayer office was shown instead. The website also features an archive of past shows.

=== Prayer requests ===
At its peak, Live Prayer received about forty thousand email prayer requests each day. A group of retired pastors read messages, pray over the requests, and write personalized replies. Live Prayer also maintains an archive of over three million praise reports from viewers.

== Live Prayer interactive CD-ROM ==
In 2007, Keller released a Live Prayer interactive CD-ROM, proudly touting it as "the greatest spiritual resource other than the Bible." The CD-ROM, sold for US$10 on the Live Prayer website, contained an archive of Keller's past daily devotionals as well as videos inviting viewers to "accept Jesus."

== Controversy ==
=== Criticism of Mitt Romney ===
On May 11, 2007, Keller wrote that "a vote for Romney is a vote for Satan" in his daily devotional because Mitt Romney is a member of the Church of Jesus Christ of Latter-day Saints (commonly referred to as Mormonism), an organization that he considers to be a "cult". Keller repeated this statement on the Live Prayer television program, which was later included in the documentary film Article VI: Faith. Politics. America. Barry Lynn of Americans United for Separation of Church and State later wrote a letter to the Internal Revenue Service asking them to revoke Live Prayer's tax exempt status due to Bill Keller's allegedly political statements. Keller later clarified his statements saying he was speaking on a spiritual topic, not a political one.

Later, on June 21, 2007, Keller appeared on the show in a Mormon temple garment, which he characterized as "magical underwear". He challenged Romney to make public his own Mormon temple garment. Finally, on June 28, 2007, Keller invited evangelist Ed Decker — a former Mormon priest who is critical of the LDS church — to discuss Mormonism, Freemasonry, and an alleged relationship between the two groups.

=== Message to Osama bin Laden ===
On September 17, 2007, Keller released a 10-minute video message, in which he asked Al-Qaeda leader Osama bin Laden to repent and "accept Jesus"; he also urged other Muslims to do the same. The video was released not only on Keller's own website, but also various other websites as well.

=== Criticism of Oprah Winfrey ===
Keller frequently criticizes talk-show host and media personality Oprah Winfrey for promoting new age spiritual products, such as The Secret and A Course in Miracles.
