= Christianné Allen =

Communications professional

- Education: Liberty University
- Occupations: Spokesperson, director of communications
- Employer: Giuliani Partners

Christianné L. Allen Hughes is a communications professional who, until August 2021, worked for Giuliani Partners the legal and consulting firm of owned by Rudy Giuliani. She worked as Director of Communication for Giuliani while still a student at Liberty University's online program. She graduated as a Communications major in 2022. She was involved with the firm from August 2019 to August 2021.

Allen currently works in the U.S. Congress as the Communications Director for Idaho Congressman Russ Fulcher, and lists herself as an ambassador for Turning Point USA and the Falkirk Center at Liberty University, a think tank started in November 2019.
