= Joy Hanna =

- Birth name: Joy Betty Lippard
- Also known as: Joy Lippard-Hanna
- Born: October 24, 1990 (age 34); Great Falls, Virginia
- Genres: Worship, CCM, soft rock
- Occupation(s): Singer, songwriter, worship leader
- Instrument(s): Vocals, singer-songwriter
- Years active: 2005–present
- Website: joyhanna.com

Joy Lippard Hanna (born October 24, 1990) is an American Christian musician and worship leader, who plays a Christian pop style of contemporary worship music with soft rock elements. She has released three independently made studio albums, since 2005, Outside and In, Joy Lippard, and Set Free. Her song, "Hole in My Pocket", charted on the Billboard magazine Hot Christian Songs chart.

== Early and personal life ==
Joy Lippard Hanna, was born on October 24, 1990, in Great Falls, Virginia, the daughter of Tommy and Esta Lippard. Her songwriting commenced the day before the terrorist attacks on September 11, 2001. She is a 2013 graduate of Liberty University, and was a worship leader at McLean Bible Church for 3 years before she moved to Houston, Texas where she leads worship and continues to write and record music.

== Music career ==
She started her music recording career in 2005, with the studio album, Outside and In, that was released on December 20, 2005. Her subsequent studio album, Joy Lippard, was released on February 24, 2009. The song, "Hole in My Pocket", charted on the Billboard magazine Hot Christian Songs chart, at a peak of No. 44. She released, Set Free, the third studio album for her career, on March 21, 2015.

== Discography ==
Studio albums

- Outside and In (December 20, 2005)
- Joy Lippard (February 24, 2009)
- Set Free (March 21, 2015)
- Just You and Me (September 27, 2019)
