= Doug Dalton =

American entrepreneur and investor (born 1972)

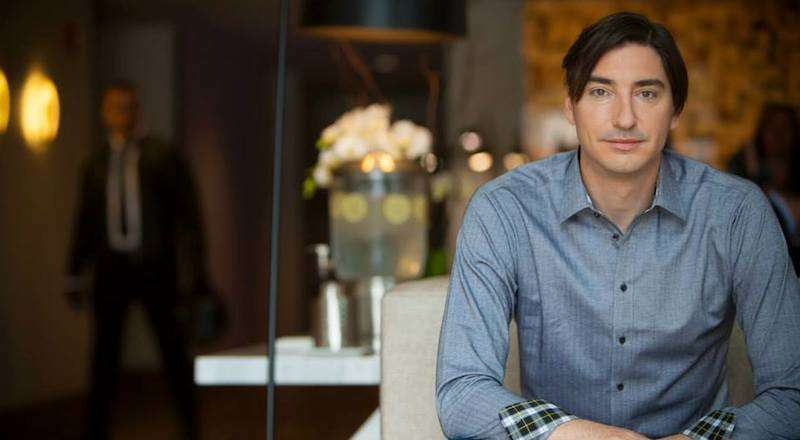
- Born: January 21, 1972 (age 54); Fairfax, Virginia, United States
- Occupations: Entrepreneur, investor
- Known for: Early internet, proprietor of the leading bars of San Francisco

Doug Dalton is an American entrepreneur, and investor. He is the owner of FutureBars, the parent company of several San Francisco establishments including Bourbon and Branch, Rickhouse, Pagan Idol, Bottle Club Pub, Swig, Lark, Local Edition, Devils Acre, Zombie Village, Nightingale, Gingers and the Cask liquor stores.

== Career ==
During his time as a lead engineer at Sprint, Dalton created the company's foundation for domestic internet. From there, he became the Senior Manager of Network Engineering and New Technologies at Netscape, where he started working on the core technology for the framework for Netscape's website. In 1998, Dalton became the Vice President of Engineering and Operations at Knowledge Universe.

In 2000, Dalton entered the electronic commerce sector becoming Chief Technology Officer for Gloss.com, a high-end online cosmetics company. When Estée Lauder Companies absorbed Gloss.com, Dalton became CTO of Estee Lauder. Dalton relocated to New York City where Estee Lauder was headquartered, and while living there discovered an interest in New York nightlife. He took this newfound interest to San Francisco.

Dalton returned to San Francisco in 2002.

Dalton teamed up with Brian Sheehy and Dahi Donnelly to create Futurebars, a parent company for concept bars and a consulting group for clients such as Ritz Carlton, Marriott, and W Hotels. As an owner of Futurebars, Dalton is a proprietor of: Local Edition, Tradition, Swig, Bourbon & Branch, Rickhouse, The Devil's Acre, and Tupper and Reed. and in 2012 had a gross revenue of over $7 million.
