= Jeri Porter =

American basketball player and coach (born 1970)

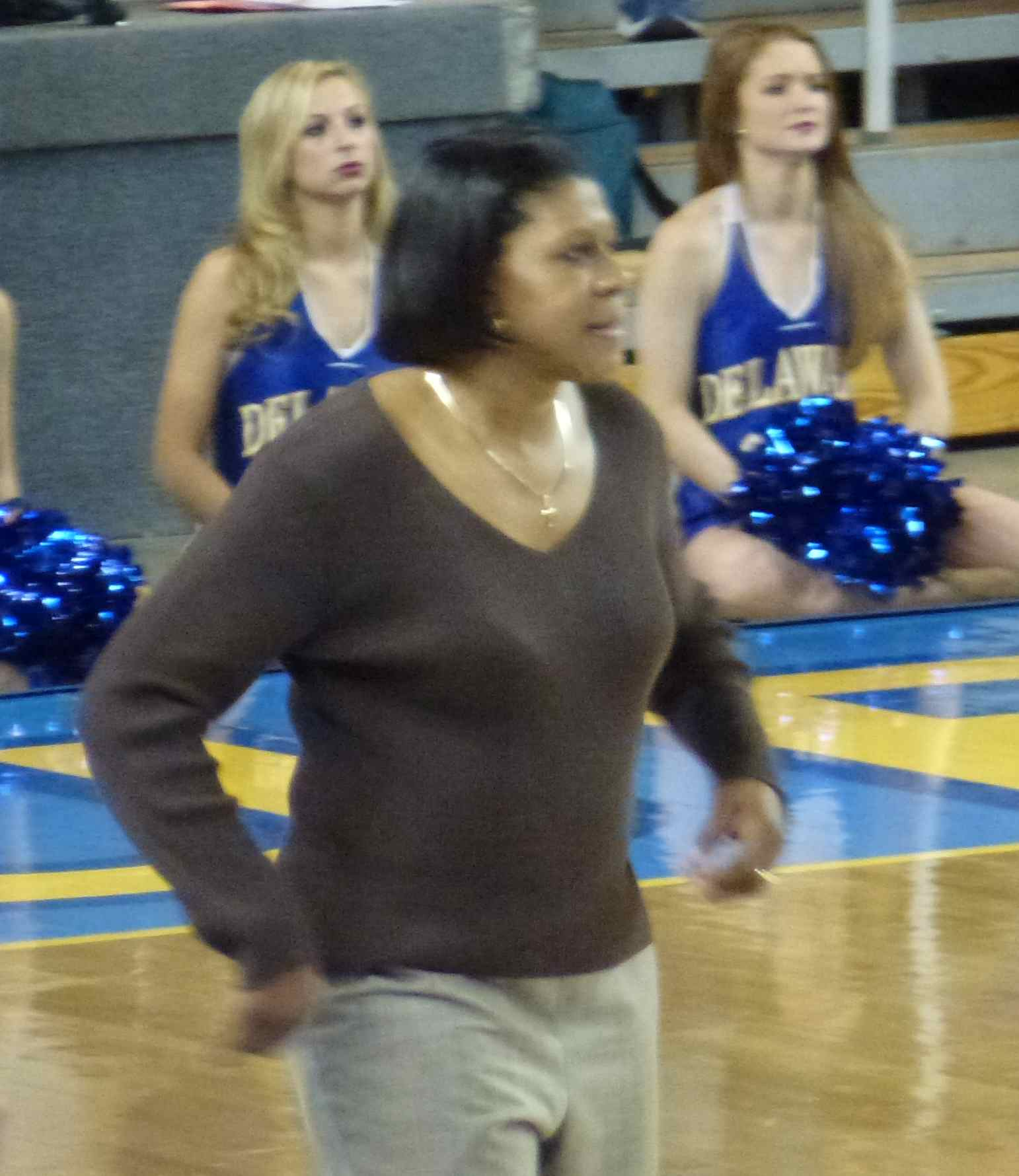

Current position
- Title: Head coach
- Team: Francis Marion
- Conference: Conference Carolinas
- Record: 332–320

Biographical details
- Born: January 23, 1970 (age 56); Capitol Heights, Maryland
- Education: Liberty

Jeri Porter (née Wiley; born January 23, 1970) is a former women's basketball program head coach at George Mason University. She coached for six years at Radford University, where she posted a 93–85 record, including a 43–39 mark in conference play. In 2007, she led Radford to a 23-win record; a second time in school history and two Big South Championship in a row.

She also coached at the University of North Alabama. From 1992 to 1998, she coached at Liberty University. She played at Liberty, and is a member of the Liberty Flames Hall of Fame.
