= Jerry Johnston =

American film producer

- Born: May 12, 1959 (age 67); Oklahoma City, Oklahoma, US
- Education: Midwestern Baptist Theological Seminary; Acadia Divinity College
- Occupations: Southern baptist, evangelical vice president, Houston Baptist University
- Spouse: Cristie Jo Huf Johnston (married 1979)
- Children: Danielle Newsome Jeremiah Johnston, PhD Jenilee Mullikin

Jerome Richard "Jerry" Johnston (born May 12, 1959) is an American evangelical Christian pastor, author, and docu-filmmaker. Johnston is currently vice president for Innovation and Strategic marketing at Houston Baptist University in Houston, Texas, and director of Christian Thinkers Society. Johnston and his wife Cristie Jo Huf Johnston are professors of theology and co-producers of a documentary in production about the "Nones" phenomenon.

== Early life and education ==
Concurrent to Johnston's senior year in high school, he took courses and graduated from Youth for Christ's Christ Unlimited Bible Institute, and he ultimately received a General Equivalency Diploma. He was accepted on a scholarship to then named Liberty Baptist College in Lynchburg, Virginia. While at Liberty, Johnston became an "associate evangelist" for the college. He studied at Midwestern Baptist College and earned a Bachelor of Arts, then he studied at Midwestern Baptist Theological Seminary in Kansas City, Missouri and earned a Master of Divinity. In May 2012, Johnston and his wife each earned Doctor of Ministry degrees from Acadia Divinity College in Wolfville, Nova Scotia, an entity affiliated with the Convention of Atlantic Baptist Churches. Johnston's doctoral thesis is entitled An Exploration of Rates and Causes of Attrition among Protestant Evangelical Clergy in the United States.

== Career ==
=== Evangelism ===
Among those converted in the Johnston crusade was the Texas evangelist Jay L. Lowder Jr. (born 1966), of Wichita Falls.

=== Pastor ===
Launched in 1996, First Family Church saw exponential growth, and the church broke ground in 1999. The sanctuary was completed at a cost of $10.1 million. Another $8.5 million was spent in 2006 on expanded facilities. The congregation peaked at four thousand members and was described as among the fastest growing churches in America.

In 2007, the Kansas City Star reported issues relating to concerns over financial accountability within First Family Church, leading to hundreds of members leaving. In his doctoral dissertation, Johnston attributed the negative media attention to his political conservatism, such as his anti-abortion convictions and his support for the Kansas constitutional amendment prohibiting same-sex marriage. In 2004, Johnston hosted Jerry Falwell, founder of Liberty University, at First Family Church to rally Christian support in the general election in which then U.S. President George W. Bush narrowly defeated John Kerry. At the gathering, Falwell encouraged pastors to be politically involved in their communities. After the constitutional amendment to ban gay marriage in Kansas passed in 2005, Johnston was highlighted as a proponent of the amendment and openly voiced his opposition to abortion. Journalist Jack Cashill, executive editor of Ingram's Magazine, agreed with Johnston's assertions that the pastor was a political media target because of his position as an influential conservative. Tax liens filed by the Internal Revenue Service related to more than $107,000 in unpaid payroll taxes from 2007 were resolved quickly in 2008. The Attorney General of Kansas investigated complaints but no violation of the Kansas Consumer Protection Act was found. A blog reported that Johnston ordered one church member asking for financial records to repent.

The elders of the church stated that even while the church was current in its monthly payments, Regions Bank accelerated the mortgage maturity from 30 to 5 years due to the 2008 financial crisis and demanded the full payment of the loan. The elder board said that AG Financial made a cash offer to Regions Bank to finance First Family Church's mortgage, but Regions Bank rejected the offer. Regions Financial Bank had not yet repaid the 2008 TARP (Troubled Asset Relief Program) loan from the federal government when it sold First Family Church's loan to Blue Valley School District. On September 5, 2011, Jerry Johnston announced the church was losing its building. On September 11, 2011, First Family Church building closed its doors. The church started hosting services at Olathe East High School and changed its name to New Day Church Kansas City. The bank paid back its $3.5 billion in the spring of 2012. The church closed in September 2012.

== Recognition ==
In 1998, Johnston delivered Liberty University's baccalaureate speech, and Liberty Baptist Theological Seminary awarded Johnston an honorary Doctor of Divinity degree.

== Books ==
- The Edge of Evil (1989);
- Why Suicide? What Parents and Teachers Must Know to Save our Kids (1987);
- Going All the Way: The Real World of Teens and Sex (1988);
- It’s Killing Our Kids: Teenage Alcohol Abuse and Addiction (1990);
- The Last Days of Planet Earth (1991);
- Who’s Listening: What our Kids are Trying to Tell Us (1992);
- Inspire your Kids to Greatness (1993);
- How to Save Your Kids From Ruin (1994).
- DANIEL Principles of Leadership, Success, and Achievement (2007)
- Apostasy Now: Similarities and Differences of Belief Systems (2007)
- Why They Die: Curing the Death Wish in our Kids (2012)
