= Cypress Chapel Christian Church =

Church in Virginia, United States

Coordinates: 36.6183°N 76.5913°W

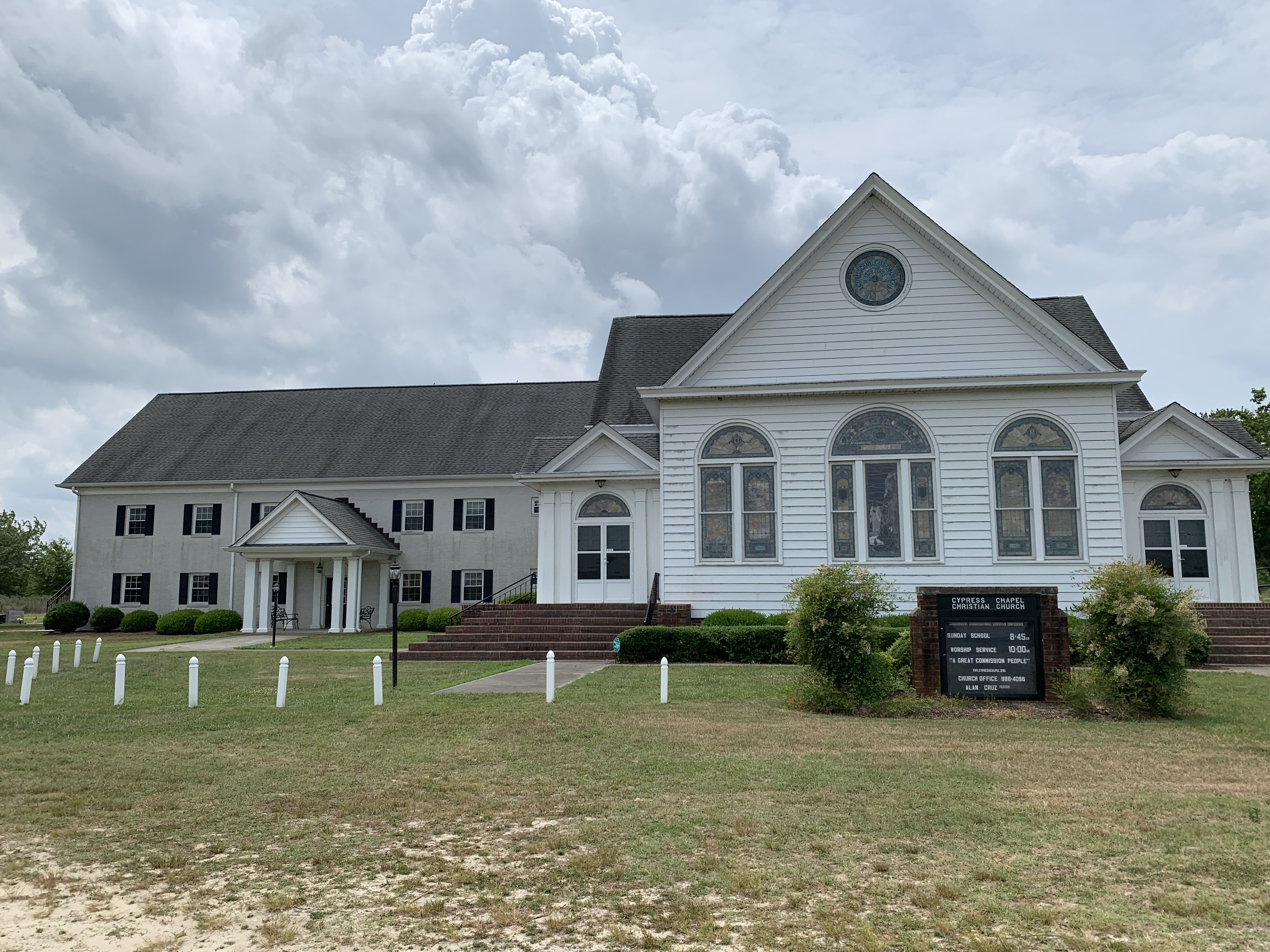
Cypress Chapel Christian Church

Cypress Chapel Christian Church is a historic church located in Suffolk, Virginia.

== History ==
According to local tradition, Christian worship near the site began around 1750. A Church of England chapel was completed on the property in 1760 but was abandoned following the Revolutionary War. In 1794, a congregation affiliated with the Christian Church, a denomination organized after splitting from the Methodists, moved into the building, which subsequently became known as Cypress Chapel Christian Church.

Cypress Chapel was among the first churches to participate in the Restoration Movement. The church hosted the first regular session of the Southern Christian Convention from May 5-8, 1858, following a regional schism with northern churches. The Reverend William B. Wellons, a nationally prominent leader within the denomination who was ordained at Cypress Chapel in 1846, served as the church's pastor until 1872. The present church sanctuary was constructed in 1925.

Cypress Chapel is currently a member of the Conservative Congregational Christian Conference.

== Historical marker ==
On May 31, 2026, a Virginia State Historical Highway Marker (Marker K 187) was officially dedicated and installed on the church property. The marker, approved by the Virginia Department of Historic Resources, reads as follows:

CYPRESS CHAPEL CHRISTIAN CHURCH According to tradition, Christian worship near this site began ca. 1750. A Church of England chapel was completed in 1760 but was abandoned following the Revolutionary War. A congregation affiliated with the Christian Church, a denomination organized in 1794 after splitting from the Methodists, moved into the building and became known as Cypress Chapel Christian Church. The first regular session of the Southern Christian Convention, which formed in 1856 after a schism with northern churches, met here in 1858. The Rev. William B. Wellons, a nationally prominent leader in the denomination who had been ordained here in 1846, served as pastor until 1872. The present sanctuary was built in 1925.
