= Lake Forest Foresters football =

Football team

- First season: 1882; 144 years ago
- Athletic director: Jim Catanzaro
- Head coach: Jim Catanzaro; 17th season, 99–57 (.635)
- Location: Lake Forest, Illinois
- Field: Farwell Field
- NCAA division: Division III
- Conference: MWC
- Colors: Red, black, and gold

Conference championships
- 7
- Website: goforesters.com/football

The Lake Forest Foresters football team, representing Lake Forest College, is an NCAA Division III college football team and member of the Midwest Conference. Lake Forest played its first intercollegiate games in 1882, with a pair of games against Northwestern University.

== Playoff appearances ==
=== NCAA Division III ===
The Foresters have made four appearances in the NCAA Division III playoffs, with a combined record of 0–4.

| Year | Round | Opponent | Result |
|---|---|---|---|
| 2002 | First Round | Wartburg | L, 0–45 |
| 2021 | First Round | Saint John's (MN) | L, 14–41 |
| 2022 | First Round | North Central (IL) | L, 0–50 |
| 2024 | Second Round | Bethel (MN) | L, 21–48 |
