= Jim Catanzaro =

American football coach (born c. 1978)

Current position
- Title: Assistant vice-president for athletics & head coach
- Team: Lake Forest
- Conference: MWC
- Record: 115–61

Biographical details
- Born: c. 1978 (age 47–48); Rome, New York, U.S.
- Education: Greenville University (2000); West Virginia University (2002); Wingate University; Liberty University (2022)

Playing career

Football
- 1996, 1998–1999: Greenville

Basketball
- 1997–2000: Greenville

Tennis
- 1997–1999: Greenville

Soccer
- 1997c. Late 1990s: Greenville

Coaching career (HC unless noted)

Football
- 2000–2002: Glenville State (DL/RC/S&C)
- 2003–2005: Wingate (DL/S&C)
- 2006–2008: Lake Forest (DC)
- 2009–present: Lake Forest

Men's lacrosse
- 2007–2011: Lake Forest

Women's lacrosse
- 2012–2014: Lake Forest

Administrative career (AD unless noted)
- 2019–2021: Lake Forest (assistant AD)
- 2021–2022: Lake Forest
- 2022–2025: Lake Forest (assoc. AD)

Head coaching record
- Overall: 115–61 (football)
- Tournaments: 0–3 (NCAA D-III playoffs)

Accomplishments and honors

Championships
- Football; 4 MWC (2012, 2021–2022, 2024)

Awards
- Football; 3× MWC Coach of the Year (2012, 2021, 2024)

Jim Catanzaro (born c. 1978) is an American college football coach. He is the assistant vice-president for athletics and head football coach for Lake Forest College, positions he has held since 2026 and 2009, respectively. He also coached for Glenville State and Wingate. He played college football, basketball, tennis, and soccer for Greenville.

Catanzaro served as the athletic director for Lake Forest from 2021 to 2022. He also began the school's men and women's lacrosse teams.

== Head coaching record ==
=== Football ===
Year	Team	Overall	Conference	Standing	Bowl/playoffs	D3^{#}
Lake Forest Foresters (Midwest Conference) (2009–present)
2009	Lake Forest	2–8	2–7	T–7th		
2010	Lake Forest	2–8	2–7	T–8th		
2011	Lake Forest	3–7	3–6	7th		
2012	Lake Forest	8–2	8–1	T–1st		
2013	Lake Forest	8–2	7–2	T–2nd		
2014	Lake Forest	4–6	2–3	4th (South)		
2015	Lake Forest	4–6	3–2	T–2nd (South)		
2016	Lake Forest	8–2	6–2	T–3rd		
2017	Lake Forest	8–2	4–1	2nd (South)		
2018	Lake Forest	6–4	4–1	2nd (South)		
2019	Lake Forest	7–3	4–1	2nd (North)		
2020–21	Lake Forest	3–0	0–0	N/A		
2021	Lake Forest	10–1	9–0	1st	L NCAA Division III First Round	23
2022	Lake Forest	9–2	8–1	T–1st	L NCAA Division III First Round	
2023	Lake Forest	7–3	6–3	T–3rd		
2024	Lake Forest	10–1	9–0	1st	L NCAA Division III Second Round	
2025	Lake Forest	7–3	7–2	T–2nd		
2026	Lake Forest	9–1	7–1	T–2nd		
Lake Forest:		115–61	91–40			
Total:		115–61				
National championship Conference title Conference division title or championship game berth
