= Jay Lowder =

American evangelist

Jay Lowder preaching at First Baptist Arnold, Missouri.

Jay Lowder is an American evangelist, author, speaker and founder of Jay Lowder Harvest Ministries based in Wichita Falls, Texas. He is the author of Midnight on Aisle Seven (ISBN 978-1616386085) and is a suicide prevention advocate. Lowder performs evangelistic outreaches at churches and student events at churches and schools. He has contributed articles for Fox News, the Washington Post and has appeared on national television stations such as CBN, TBN, CNN and Fox News. Additionally, his ministry airs The Darkest Hour which appeared on late-night blocks on the Discovery Channel, Freeform, Pop, AMGTV, Daystar and TBN. He has appeared on Life Today with James and Betty Robinson, as well as Hour of Power. His daughter has an extremely rare disease, Stills disease.
