= Jeff Johnson (BET personality) =

American journalist

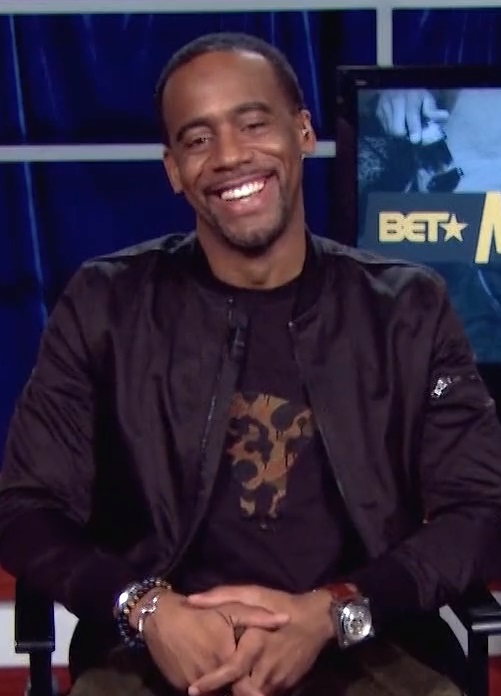
- Jeff Johnson in 2018
- Born: Harrogate, England
- Other names: Jeffrey Johnson
- Occupations: TV personality, motivational speaker, political activist, communication specialist
- Website: www.jeffsnation.com

Jeffrey Johnson is a communications specialist and journalist. He appeared on the TV show Rap City on the BET cable network in the United States, where he spoke about such issues as violence and voting.

== Early life ==
Born in the UK, but raised in Cleveland, Ohio, Johnson was an active leader as a child, and participated in track and field. Johnson graduated from Cleveland Heights High School and went on to attend the University of Toledo, where he was president of the Student Government and the Black Student Union. Johnson served as National Director for the NAACP's Youth and College Division, as well as Vice President of the Hip hop Summit Action Network. He is married to Jacqueline A. Johnson and a father of five, daughter Madison(1999) and sons Myles, Malcolm, Baldwin and Garvey.

== Black Entertainment Television ==
Johnson's involvement in these organizations piqued the interest of BET, who thought that he could use his knowledge of cultural and political affairs on their show Rap City, He was on the show for two seasons, playing the part of Cousin Jeff. He was also seen on the show The Jeff Johnson Chronicles. In August 2008 he hosted The Truth With Jeff Johnson, a weekly news show.

== Recent activities ==
Johnson has had public speaking engagements at churches, universities and local communities across the United States.

He worked as senior advisor for media and youth outreach for People for the American Way, as national director of the youth and college division of the NAACP, and as vice president of the Hip Hop Summit Action Network (HSAN).

Johnson was the only American reporter to interview Ellen Johnson Sirleaf, Africa's first elected female head of state and Liberia's first elected female president. Johnson was one of only two news correspondents to interview Sudanese president Omar Al-Bashir, who had not granted interviews with American media outlets for thirteen years.

Johnson interviewed President Barack Obama, Senator Hillary Clinton, and Minister Louis Farrakhan. In 2007, he testified before the United States House Committee on Homeland Security regarding recovery efforts in the aftermath of Hurricane Katrina (2005).

Johnson has published social and political commentaries for CNN.com, The Root.com and Black Politics on the Web.com. Johnson has been quoted by Newsweek and The Boston Globe. Johnson currently contributes commentary and analysis about issues related to race, politics, popular culture and socio-economics for MSNBC, CNN, Fox News, XM radio, Sirius Satellite Radio, BET and The Dr. Phil Show.

Johnson has recently made an appearance at Fort Valley State University in Fort Valley, Georgia.

Johnson was also the Detroit host for the 2013 AT&T 28 Days series.

Johnson became a member of Alpha Phi Alpha fraternity on the fraternity's 110th Anniversary, December 4, 2016.
