= Jurnee Carr =

- Born: 1994 (age 31–32); Johnson City, Tennessee
- Education: Liberty University, Cum Laude University High School (2013)

Founded in 2007 by Jurnee Carr, the organization Jurnee's Journey: Helping All God’s Creations has provided over $48,000 in support to non-profit no-kill animal rescue groups locally, nationally, and internationally. She has spoken to over 400,000 people about animal issues. Carr has been actively involved with The Humane Society of the United States since 2009. She served on their Youth Advisory Board from 2009–2012, and was an intern at their corporate headquarters in Gaithersburg, Maryland in summer 2015. Carr was asked by the Tennessee State Director of The Humane Society of the United States to be a volunteer district leader.

Carr won the title of Miss Teen International 2011 as Miss Teen Virginia International in Chicago, Illinois . She also received the Preliminary Fun Fashion Award, Photogenic Award, and was the winner of the Go Red Online Voting Award. She traveled over 100,000 miles during her reign as an advocate for animals and the International Pageants national platform - The American Heart Association . Her crowning moment was featured in Times Square, New York.

Carr also won the title of Miss Tennessee International 2016 as Miss Tri-Cities International in Franklin, Tennessee on April 2, 2016. She also received the Woman of Excellence Award, Community Service Award, and Best Overall Evening Gown Award. She will compete for the title of Miss International 2016 in Jacksonville, Florida in July 2016.

== Honors and awards ==
Cum laude undergraduate honors - Liberty University 2016

Miss Tennessee International 2016

Tennessee State Senate Proclamation 2016

Dean’s List - Liberty University 2013-2016

Tennessee Governor's Volunteer Star Award: Adult - Carter County 2016

Research Project Intern for The Humane Society of the United States at their corporate headquarters in Gaithersburg, MD - Summer 2015

University High Homecoming Queen 2013

Distinguished Citizen Athlete Award from University High School 2013

ConGRADulations! Class of 2013

Tennessee Governor's Volunteer Star Award: Youth - Sullivan County 2013

Prudential Spirit of Community Bronze Award AND

Advocate for the Stop Puppies Mills Campaign at the International Animal Care Expo 2012, Las Vegas, NV resulting in the closing of a loophole in the Animal Welfare Act for online breeders

Appreciation Award from the American Heart Association 2012 - "For your support of the mission of the American Heart Association"

Selected as a speaker for Taking Action for Animals Conference in Washington, D.C., 2011

Daily Point of Light #4611 in 2011

Certificate of Recognition awarded by the Student Outreach Department of The Humane Society of the United States

Tennessee House Joint Resolution #1268 in 2010

Youth Advisory Board for The Humane Society of the United States 2009-2012

Scholar Athlete of the Year 2009 - Ridgeview School

Certificate of Special Congressional Recognition from Congressman Phil Roe

Girl Scout Bronze Award

5 time 4-H Public Speaking contest winner

== Publications ==
Publications for The Humane Society of the United States to supplement internationally aired webinars for Humane Society Academy. Researched and written by Jurnee Carr as an intern at The Humane Society of the United States corporate headquarters in Gaithersburg, Maryland in summer 2015.

Your All-Inclusive Guide to the Humane Backyard

Finding Peace with Canada Geese
