= Lakeysha Hallmon =

American businessperson

- Born: Batesville, Mississippi
- Occupations: Social entrepreneur, speaker, and author
- Known for: Village Market, Village Retail, Our Village United
- Website: drkeyhallmon.com

Lakeysha Hallmon is an American social entrepreneur, speaker, and author who is best known as the founder of The Village Market, a national initiative supporting Black-owned businesses through commerce, marketplaces, and campaigns.

== Early life and education ==
Hallmon grew up in Batesville, Mississippi. She received her BA from Tougaloo College, MED Curriculum and instructions from University of Ole Miss, and graduated EdD from Liberty University. She worked as an education and evaluation specialist.

== Career ==
Early in her career, Hallmon worked as an education and evaluation specialist.

Hallmon moved to Atlanta in 2011 and founded The Village Market in 2016, a platform that connects Black-owned businesses to consumers through access to business resources, educational programs, and marketplaces.

In 2017, Hallmon launched Our Village United (OVU), a non-profit organization, that supports small business development through its primary program, Elevate. Our Village Market has allocated $800,000 in grants since its inception. In 2020, she expanded her efforts with the opening of The Village Retail, a brick-and-mortar store in Atlanta, at Ponce City Market, dedicated to showcasing up and coming brands.

In 2023, Hallmon was appointed to Mayor Andre Dickens's Women's Advisory Council.

In 2024, Hallmon published No One Is Self-Made: Build Your Village to Flourish in Business and Life, a book that challenges the myth of individualism and emphasizes collaboration and community as critical tools for business and personal development. Essence described the book as "part memoir, part manifesto, dismantl[ing] the myth of individualism in business… Hallmon delivers a timely and necessary guide for anyone striving to build lasting wealth while staying rooted in purpose."

Hallmon also serves on the Board of trustees for Tougaloo College and the board of directors for Invest Atlanta, advocating for equitable development and small business growth.

== Awards and recognition ==
- Forbes 50 Champions
- The Root 100
- Georgia Trend's 500 Most Influential Leaders
- Atlanta Business Chronicle's 40 Under 40
- Trailblazer Award from Atlanta Business League
