= Jen Hamilton =

American nurse, influencer, and author

- Born: August 19, 1990 (age 36)
- Education: Liberty University
- Occupations: Social media personality; author; nurse
- Notable work: Birth Vibes: Stories and Strategies for an Empowered Birth
- Spouse: Brian Hamilton (m. 2012; sep. 2026)
- Children: 2

TikTok information
- Page: Jen Hamilton
- Followers: 5 M
- Last updated: August 4, 2026
- Website: jenhamilton.co

Jen Hamilton (born August 19, 1990) is an American social media influencer, nurse, and author. Her 2026 book, Birth Vibes: Stories and Strategies for an Empowered Birth, made the The New York Times Best Seller list.

== Early life and education ==
Hamilton was born on August 19, 1990. She grew up in Asheboro, North Carolina, and graduated with a nursing degree from Liberty University in Lynchburg, Virginia.

== Career ==
Hamilton is a labor and delivery nurse and social media influencer. She makes online content about nursing. She began her nursing career as an emergency room nurse and later transitioned into labor and delivery, earning her board-certification in inpatient obstetrics. She began making social media content in 2020 during the COVID-19 pandemic.

By 2023, she had amassed a following of over three million on Facebook, Instagram, and TikTok.

On May 5, 2026, she published the book Birth Vibes: Stories and Strategies for an Empowered Birth. Her book was included in The New York Times Best Seller list.

She founded Hot Mess Express, a nonprofit that provides free home cleaning services for low-income parents.

In July 2026, Hamilton launched a merchandise collection, called "Sister of Solidarity", on her website. She pledged to donate 100 percent of the proceeds from her July and August 2026 sales to charities that support women rebuilding their lives after leaving relationships. Hamilton raised over $40,000 in the first few days of selling the line. By July 29, 2026, she had raised over $100,000.

== Personal life ==
Hamilton lives in North Carolina. She is a practicing Christian and describes herself as being liberal. In 2025, she spoke out against the MAGA movement, stating that it directly contradicts the teachings of Jesus.

She married Brian Hamilton in August 2012. They have two children. The couple temporarily separated in 2022. They separated a second time in 2026, following her husband's extramarital affair.
