= Article VI (film) =

- Film poster
- Directed by: Jack Donaldson; Bryan Hall
- Produced by: Reed Dickens; John Carosella; Bryan Hall; Jack Donaldson
- Release date: 2008
- Running time: 90 minutes
- Country: United States
- Language: English

Article VI: Faith. Politics. America is a 2008 documentary film about religion and politics.

== Synopsis ==
The story follows filmmaker Bryan Hall's experience as a Mormon during the 2008 Presidential race. While following the debates, Hall becomes increasingly aware of the escalating attacks against a particular candidate over his religion: Mitt Romney, who happens to also be a Mormon. Hall decides to investigate this issue and comes to realize that the issue of religious bigotry in politics goes far beyond his own faith. It has been the subject of intense argument from the earliest days of the American colonies. In the end, Hall makes the case for the need for religious tolerance in America; not just for his religion, but for all religions.

== Production ==
In July 2007, Director Bryan Hall and his film crew began traveling the country in an RV, investigating this issue. The film was shot on location in over 30 states across the U.S. The majority of filming was completed by September 2007. Over the course of those 3 months, they gathered close to 150 hours of footage, from interviews, to news clips and political propaganda. Key interviews include Richard Land, Pastor Robert Jeffress, Hugh Hewitt, Bill Keller, Randall Balmer, Edwin Meese, David French, Judge Roy Moore, Flip Benham, Charles Cohen and Pastor George Evans.
