= Tad Agoglia =

American entrepreneur

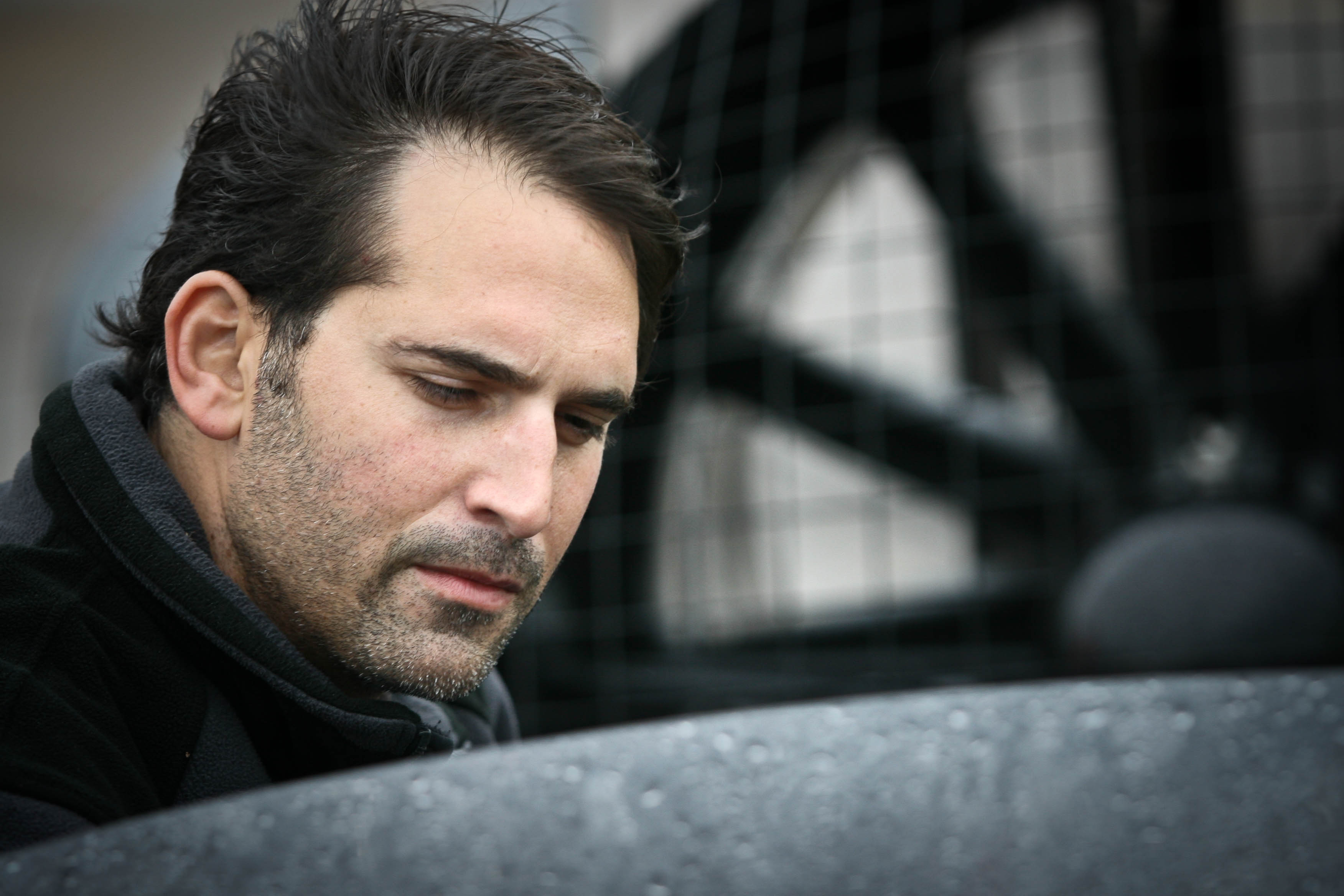

Tad Skylar Agoglia (born May 22, 1976) is an American entrepreneur and humanitarian. He is the chairman and founder of The First Response Team of America, a nonprofit organization providing immediate disaster relief and recovery services to communities using specialized heavy equipment and a travelling crew of highly trained responders.

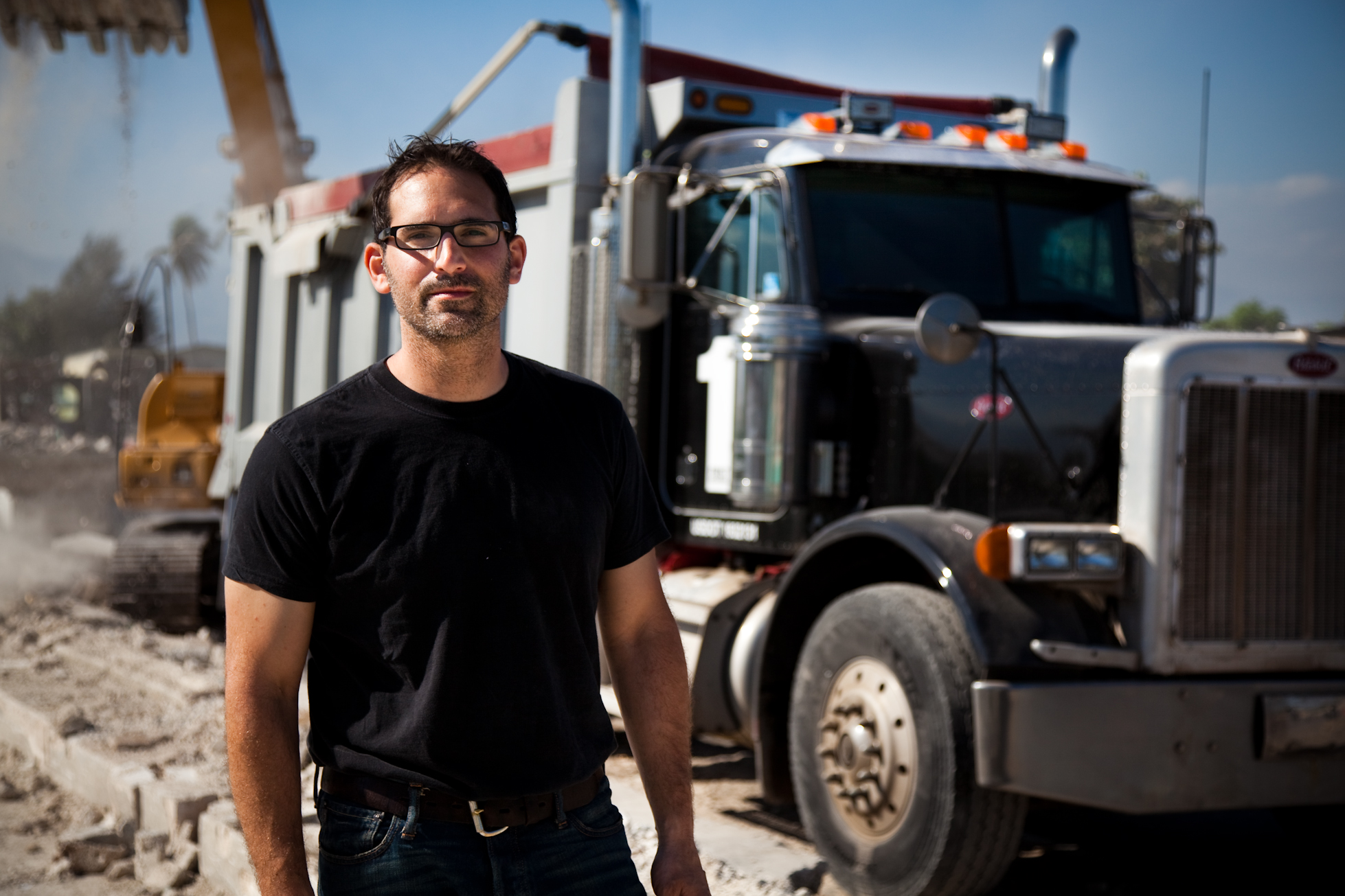

== Early life ==
Agoglia was born in Queens, New York and grew up in Huntington, New York. Agoglia first started working at age 12, pumping gas. He was a successful entrepreneur by the time he was in high school, building various businesses in landscaping, snow plowing, Christmas tree farming, and contracting. He is of Italian descent through his father.

== Career ==
Prior to creating the First Response Team of America, Agoglia owned and operated an excavation and crane company.His for-profit company, Disaster Recovery Solutions LLC, performed debris removal work under contracts following large-scale disasters.

In May 2007, Agoglia and his crew were in the middle of a contracting job in Missouri when an EF-5 tornado leveled the town of Greensburg, Kansas, destroying 95% of the community.

He left Missouri with his equipment from his LLC, and started toward what was left of Greensburg. Greensburg's already limited resources were either destroyed or inaccessible to its firefighters and the town was in desperate need for Agoglia's uniquely specialized equipment. Fortuitously, Agoglia had brought the exact machinery needed to clear the roads of debris and power lines, and helping the firefighters access their firehouse and equipment. Agoglia spent weeks in Greensburg, assisting families to clear debris from their home sites.

From that Greensburg storm moving forward, Agoglia and his Team travelled from one disaster zone to the next, offering their assistance to every community they could, for no charge. The first 2 years of the not-for-profit work operated using over $1 million worth of equipment from Disaster Recovery Solutions LLC and also from Agoglia's personal life's savings of over $1 million; a pocket of wealth earned not solely from the LLC, but also first pennies earned since he started working at just 12 years old. Responding pro bono to 18 communities in those 2 years, Agoglia felt fulfilled but was financially depleted. Entering the 2008 financial crisis, it was poor timing to launch an official non-profit dependent on donor assistance.

In planning a more specialized fleet for the newly founded charity, Agoglia went to a Peterbilt dealership in Baltimore, with the intentions of buying a new truck. He met the dealership President, John Arscott, who was inspired by his story. In the midst of the recession, he insisted that Agoglia take 3 Peterbilt trucks of his choosing for only the promise that one day, John and his sons could join Agoglia in a response.

In 2008, Agoglia was chosen as a CNN Top Ten Hero of the Year and featured as a People Magazine "Hero Among Us".

In 2010, Agoglia was presented with the Jefferson Award for Public Service and recognized in GQ Magazine in its Better Men Better World Search.

In 2015, Agoglia was awarded the Extraordinary Commitment of Service to the Community Award by the RUMI Forum of Washington, D.C.

== First Response Team of America ==
From its inception until presently (2015), the FRTA has responded to 84 communities in the US and to Haiti for the 2010 earthquake. The Team specializes in confined space search and rescue, swift water rescue, powering critical infrastructure, and quick-response debris removal.

The organization derived from Agoglia's previous business, Disaster Recovery Solutions LLC, a crane company that operated on debris removal government contracts after large-scale disasters.

In May 2007, Disaster Recovery Solutions was working a contracting job in Missouri when an EF5 tornado leveled the city of Greensburg, Kansas, destroying 95% of the community. The town's limited resources were destroyed and/or inaccessible to its firefighters and the town was in need of specialized heavy equipment. Agoglia left the contract job in Missouri and brought machinery to clear the roads of debris and power lines, helping the firefighters access their firehouse and equipment. In the following days and weeks, home sites and crucial buildings were cleared for families and the community. In March 2012, after a destructive EF3 tornado struck West Liberty, Kentucky, Agoglia and his team were helping out the ravaged city. They provided clean-up efforts despite the challenging difficulties the tornado brought on in the mountainous community.

== Links ==
- 2008 Heroes, cnn.com. Retrieved January 26, 2016.
- "Floods: U.S. 'deserves this type of response'", June 20, 2008. Retrieved January 22, 2016.
- National Council on Readiness and Preparation, ncorp.org, June 20, 2008. Retrieved July 22, 2014.
- National Conference for Secure Communities, nationalcongress.org. June 20, 2008. Retrieved September 4, 2009.
- People Magazine: 'After The Flood: In ravaged midwestern towns, Tad Agoglia comes in with a cleanup brigade', July 6, 2008 (Vol 70, pg. 64). Retrieved October 15, 2010.
- "The Pete Store Gives Back: The Pete Store donates trucks to Non-Profit First Response Team of America", thepetestore.com, July 10, 2009. Retrieved January 27, 2016.
- "Every Day Heroes: In the Eye of the Storm", menshealth.com, October 23, 2013. Retrieved January 22, 2016.
- GQ Magazine: Better Men Better World Search 2010. August 5, 2010. Retrieved December 12, 2012.
- The Weather Channel: 'Riches to Rags'. February 26, 2015. Retrieved February 28, 2015.
- Wall Street Journal: 'Ex-Contractor Seeks Corporate Cash To Continue Disaster Aid Firm'. August 16, 2010. Retrieved August 19, 2011.
