= First Family Church =

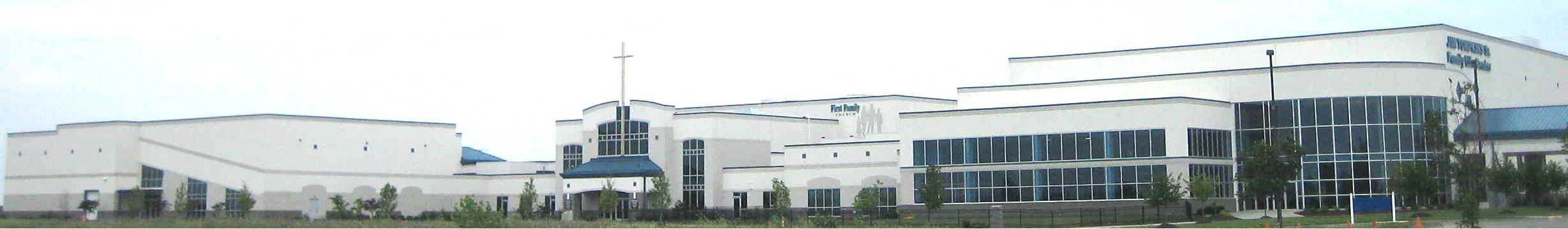
- Location: Overland Park, Kansas
- Country: United States
- Denomination: Baptist

History
- Founded: September 1996

Architecture
- Completed: April 2001
- Closed: September 2012

First Family Church (FFC) was a Baptist megachurch located in Overland Park in southern Johnson County, Kansas, on 51 acres (210,000 m^{2}) in the southwestern portion of the Kansas City Metropolitan Area of the United States. It was affiliated with the Southern Baptist Convention. On September 11, 2011, First Family Church building closed its doors. In September 2012, the Church closed down. The building was constructed between May 2000 and March 2001.

== History ==
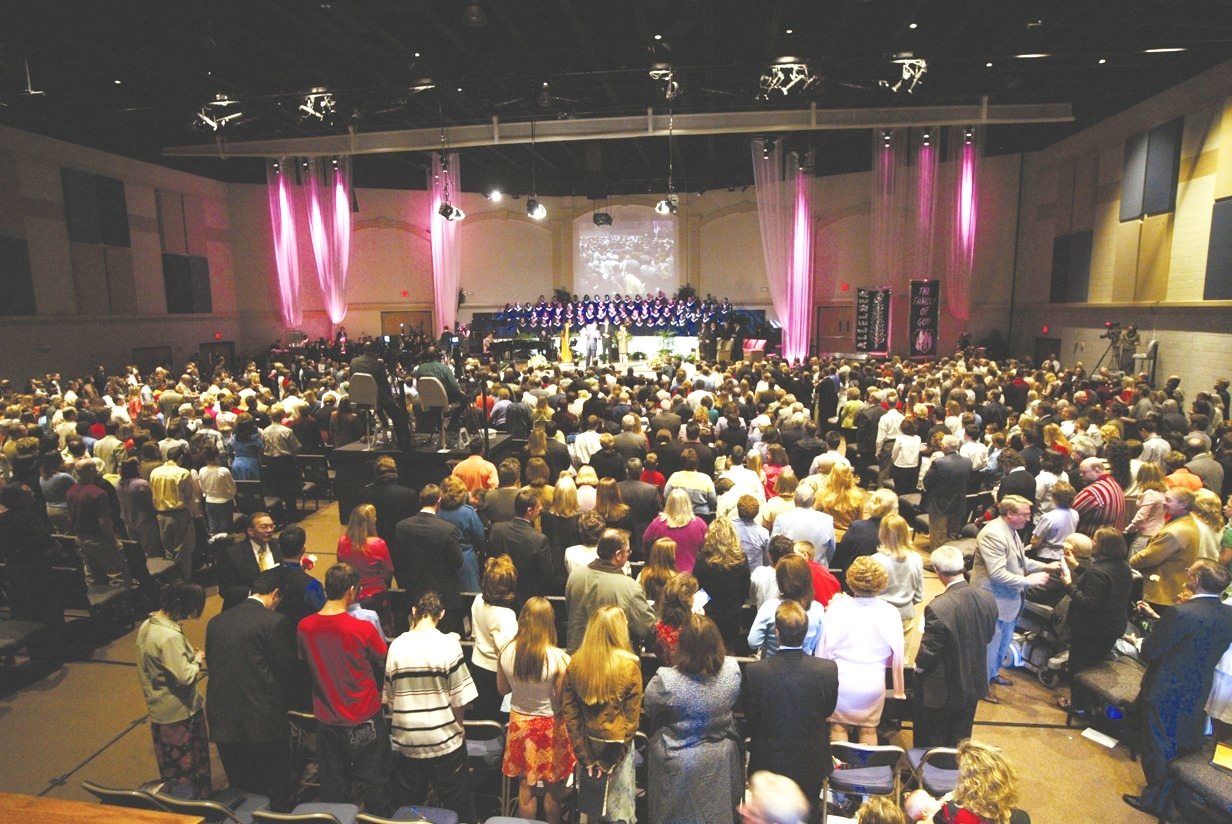
Worship Service during Discover Life Kansas City Crusade 2005 held at FFC

First Family Church began when Pastor Johnston liquidated nearly $200,000 in assets from his debt-free ministry organization Jerry Johnston Ministries to start the congregation in his hometown of Overland Park in September 1996. From its beginning, FFC had eleven different rental facilities, from schools to movie theaters.

In April 2001, it dedicated a new building including a 1,500-seat sanctuary. The church then had 4,000 members.

In July 2001, First Family Church launched its television ministry. Some sermons were broadcast globally via satellite and archive web video-streaming.

In the fall of 2007, First Family launched First Family Academy..

== Programs ==
First Family Church offered many outreach ministries to the community of Kansas City. Some of which were: the annual Operation Thanksgiving, which provided hundreds of meals to those without. The Shelter Shower ministry that provided a baby shower for expectant mothers who did not have friends or family to offer that for them. The Shelter Barrels ministry that was available for First Family Church members to bring designated items each month for families in need. Every month First Family Church members prepared meals for homeless shelters in the Kansas City metro area. Gifts were taken to a battered women's shelter, and Bibles and blankets were taken to those in need during the winter months.

== Beliefs ==
First Family Church launched a sermon series on Christian Ethics. In a Reuters publication the writer addressed the issue of "Ethics crisis in America? Church leaders say yes." The pastor of First Family Church commented on the crisis "Honesty is honesty. It doesn't matter if you are Christian, Jewish, Muslim, whatever. A lot of these debacles we're seeing can be traced and sourced back to a lack of good old ethics".

The Boston Globe reported that conservative churches in the state of Kansas, First Family Church among them, opposed same-sex marriage and supported a measure to ban it.

On May 7, 2005 First Family Church's pastor Jerry Johnston reportedly stood against evolution and believed evolution to be a non-scientific theory that should be taught as such.

September 22, 2004, The Lawrence Journal World reported that First Family Church Pastor Jerry Johnston and the Reverend Jerry Falwell urged Christian leaders in Kansas to mobilize their congregations for upcoming elections.

== Controversy ==
In March 2007, The Kansas City Star ran a front-page investigative series of articles on financial concerns at First Family Church and that hundreds of members had left the church in recent years due to concerns about financial responsibility. The paper published several follow-up articles on additional questionable activities of the Johnstons: lavish lifestyles, Jerry and Jeremy Johnston side businesses, as well as delinquent tax payments. Additional reporting was done referencing that all of Jerry Johnston's children and his mother worked on staff with him.

After the stories appeared, Bott Radio Network (a Christian network with 50 stations) based in the same city as First Family Church, announced it was dropping Jerry Johnston and First Family Church from its local AM station (the only station in its network that the show was on). "Bott said the newspaper report raised some serious questions that could be easily answered if the church joined the ECFA" and that the ministry refused to join the Evangelical Council for Financial Accountability (ECFA) pursuant to the radio networks standards.

In July 2007, a follow-up article was printed in The Kansas City Star citing additional allegations, including the misuse of a $50,000 contribution to Jerry Johnston Ministries that was allegedly diverted to a personal account of the Johnstons. The article also reported that after the initial March 2007 articles in The Kansas City Star, the Kansas Attorney General's office began an investigation into whether Jerry Johnston used church money for personal gain.

A contractor who worked for the church filed several complaints regarding the companies with the Internal Revenue Service, charging that church employees were forced to work for the companies, that church donations were used to fund Jerry Johnston Publications, and that church resources were used by J Cubed Media to conduct business.

== Foreclosure and shutdown ==
In February 2011, Regions Financial Corporation filed a foreclosure petition on the church. The bank requested the church be placed in receivership, claiming the church owed $14.4 million on two loans. The elders of the church stated that even while the FFC was current in its monthly payments, Regions Bank accelerated the mortgage maturity from 30 to five years due to the 2008 financial crisis and demanded the full payment of the loan. The elder board stated that AG Financial made a cash offer to Regions Bank to finance First Family Church's mortgage, but Regions Bank rejected the offer. Regions Financial Bank had not yet repaid the 2008 TARP (Troubled Asset Relief Program) loan from the federal government when it sold First Family Church's loan to Blue Valley School District. The bank paid back its $3.5 billion in the spring of 2012. Part of the bank's filing mentioned the church had a payroll of $915,000 a year, with over $600,000 of that going to the Johnston family. On September 5, 2011, Jerry Johnston announced the church was losing its building. On September 11, 2011, First Family Church building closed its doors. The church started hosting services at Olathe East High School and changed its name to New Day Church Kansas City. New Day Church Kansas City closed down September 2012.

In 2014, the First Family Church building was purchased by the Blue Valley School District, renovated, and repurposed into its "Hilltop Learning Center," a center for early childhood education.
