= Internet censorship and surveillance in Asia =

Internet censorship and surveillance by country (2018): Pervasive Substantial / Selective Little or none Unclassified / No data

This list of Internet censorship and surveillance in Asia provides information on the types and levels of Internet censorship and surveillance that is occurring in countries in Asia.

Detailed country by country information on Internet censorship and surveillance is provided in the Freedom on the Net reports from Freedom House, by the OpenNet Initiative, by Reporters Without Borders, and in the Country Reports on Human Rights Practices from the U.S. State Department Bureau of Democracy, Human Rights, and Labor. The ratings produced by several of these organizations are summarized below as well as in the Censorship by country article.

== Classifications ==
The level of Internet censorship and surveillance in a country is classified in one of the four categories: pervasive, substantial, selective, and little or no censorship or surveillance. The classifications are based on the classifications and ratings from the Freedom on the Net reports by Freedom House supplemented with information from the OpenNet Initiative (ONI), Reporters Without Borders (RWB), and the Country Reports on Human Rights Practices by the U.S. State Department Bureau of Democracy, Human Rights, and Labor.

Pervasive censorship or surveillance: A country is classified as engaged in pervasive censorship or surveillance when it often censors political, social, and other content, is engaged in mass surveillance of the Internet, and retaliates against citizens who circumvent censorship or surveillance with imprisonment or other sanctions. A country is included in the "pervasive" category when it:

- is rated as "not free" with a total score of 71 to 100 in the Freedom on the Net (FOTN) report from Freedom House,
- is rated "not free" in FOTN or is not rated in FOTN and
  - is included on the "Internet enemies" list from Reporters Without Borders, or
  - when the OpenNet Initiative categorizes the level of Internet filtering as pervasive in any of the four areas (political, social, conflict/security, and Internet tools) for which they test.

Substantial censorship or surveillance: Countries included in this classification are engaged in substantial Internet censorship and surveillance. This includes countries where a number of categories are subject to a medium level of filtering or many categories are subject to a low level of filtering. A country is included in the "substantial" category when it:

- is not included in the "pervasive" category, and
  - is rated as "not free" in the Freedom on the Net (FOTN) report from Freedom House, or
  - is rated "partly free" or is not rated in FOTN, and
    - is included on the "Internet enemies" list from Reporters Without Borders, or
    - when the OpenNet Initiative categorizes the level of Internet filtering as pervasive or substantial in any of the four areas (political, social, conflict/security, and Internet tools) for which they test.

Selective censorship or surveillance: Countries included in this classification were found to practice selective Internet censorship and surveillance. This includes countries where a small number of specific sites are blocked or censorship targets a small number of categories or issues. A country is included in the "selective" category when it:

- is not included in the "pervasive" or "substantial" categories, and
  - is rated as "partly free" in the Freedom on the Net (FOTN) report from Freedom House, or
  - is included on the "Internet enemies" list from Reporters Without Borders, or
  - is not rated in FOTN and the OpenNet Initiative categorizes the level of Internet filtering as selective in any of the four areas (political, social, conflict/security, and Internet tools) for which they test.

Little or no censorship or surveillance: A country is included in the "little or no censorship or surveillance" category when it is not included in the "pervasive", "substantial" or "selective" categories.

This classification includes countries that are listed as "free" on the Freedom on the Net list from Freedom House, are not listed as "Enemies of the Internet" by Reporters Without Borders (RWB), and for which no evidence of Internet filtering was found by the OpenNet Initiative (ONI) in any of the four areas (political, social, conflict/security, and Internet tools) for which they test. Other controls such as voluntary filtering, self-censorship, and other types of public or private action to limit child pornography, hate speech, defamation, or theft of intellectual property often exist. The various nation sections, below, include ratings by ONI, RWB, etc.

== Pervasive censorship or surveillance ==
=== Bahrain ===
- Rated "not free" by Freedom House in Freedom on the Net in 2011 (score 62), 2012 (score 71), 2013 (score 72), 2014 (score 74), 2015 (score 72), 2016 (score 71), 2017 (score 72), and 2018 (score 71).
- Listed as pervasive in the political and social areas, as substantial in Internet tools, and as selective in conflict/security by ONI in August 2009.
- Listed as an Enemy of the Internet by RWB in 2012.
- Listed as a State Enemy of the Internet by RWB in 2013 for involvement in active, intrusive surveillance of news providers, resulting in grave violations of freedom of information and human rights.

Bahrain enforces an effective news blackout using an array of repressive measures, including keeping the international media away, harassing human rights activists, arresting bloggers and other online activists (one of whom died in detention), prosecuting free speech activists, and disrupting communications, especially during major demonstrations.

On 5 January 2009 the Ministry of Culture and Information issued an order (Resolution No 1 of 2009) pursuant to the Telecommunications Law and Press and Publications Law of Bahrain that regulates the blocking and unblocking of websites. This resolution requires all ISPs – among other things – to procure and install a website blocking software solution chosen by the Ministry. The Telecommunications Regulatory Authority ("TRA") assisted the Ministry of Culture and Information in the execution of the said Resolution by coordinating the procurement of the unified website blocking software solution. This software solution is operated solely by the Ministry of Information and Culture and neither the TRA nor ISPs have any control over sites that are blocked or unblocked.

=== China ===
- Rated "not free" in Freedom on the Net by Freedom House in 2009 (score 79), 2011 (score 83), 2012 (score 85), 2013 (score 86), 2014 (score 87), 2015 (score 88), 2016 (score 88), 2017 (score 87), and 2018 (score 88).
- Listed as pervasive in the political and conflict/security areas and as substantial in social and Internet tools by ONI in June 2009 and August 2012.
- Listed as an Enemy of the Internet by RWB since 2008.
- Listed as a State Enemy of the Internet by RWB in 2013 for involvement in active, intrusive surveillance of news providers, resulting in grave violations of freedom of information and human rights.

Internet censorship in China is among the most stringent in the world. The government blocks Web sites that discuss Tibetan independence and the Dalai Lama, Taiwan independence, police brutality, the 1989 Tiananmen Square protests and massacre, freedom of speech, pornography, some international news sources and propaganda outlets (such as the VOA), certain occult movements (such as Falun Gong), and many blogging websites. At the end of 2007 51 cyber dissidents were reportedly imprisoned in China for their online postings. According to Human Rights Watch, in China the government also continues to violate domestic and international legal guarantees of freedom of press and expression by restricting bloggers, journalists, and an estimated more than 500 million Internet users. The government requires Internet search firms and state media to censor issues deemed officially "sensitive", and blocks access to foreign websites. However, the rise of Chinese online social networks such as Qzone, Tencent Music, Tencent Video, WeChat and in particularly Sina's Weibo, which has 200 million users—has created a new platform for citizens to express opinions and to challenge official limitations on freedom of speech despite intense scrutiny by China's censors.

=== Iran ===
- Rated "not free" in the Freedom on the Net report from Freedom House in 2009 (76 score), 2011 (89 score), 2012 (90 score), 2013 (91 score), 2014 (89 score), 2015 (87 score), 2016 (score 87), 2017 (score 85), and 2018 (score 85).
- Listed as pervasive in the political, social, and Internet tools areas and as substantial in conflict/security by ONI in June 2009.
- Listed as an Enemy of the Internet by RWB in 2011.
- Listed as a State Enemy of the Internet by RWB in 2013 for involvement in active, intrusive surveillance of news providers, resulting in grave violations of freedom of information and human rights.

The Islamic Republic of Iran continues to expand and consolidate its technical filtering system, which is among the most extensive in the world. A centralized system for Internet filtering has been implemented that augments the filtering conducted at the Internet service provider (ISP) level. Filtering targets content critical of the government, religion, pornographic websites, political blogs, and human's rights websites, weblogs, and online magazines. Bloggers in Iran have been imprisoned for their Internet activities. The Iranian government temporarily blocked access, between 12 May 2006 and January 2009, to video-upload sites such as YouTube.com. Flickr, which was blocked for almost the same amount of time was opened in February 2009. But after 2009 election protests YouTube, Flickr, Twitter, Facebook and many more websites were blocked indefinitely.

=== Kuwait ===
- Listed as pervasive in the social and Internet tools areas and as selective in political and conflict/security by ONI in June 2009.

The primary target of Internet filtering is pornography and, to a lesser extent, gay and lesbian content. The Kuwait Ministry of Communication regulates ISPs, making them block pornographic, anti-religion, anti-tradition, and anti-security websites. Both private ISPs and the government take actions to filter the Internet.

The Kuwait Institute for Scientific Research (KISR) operates the Domain Name System in Kuwait and does not register domain names which are "injurious to public order or to public sensibilities or otherwise do not comply with the laws of Kuwait". VoIP is legal in Kuwait, and Zain, one of the mobile operators, started testing VoLTE in Kuwait.

=== North Korea ===
- Listed as an Internet enemy by RWB in 2011.
- Not categorized by ONI due to lack of data.

North Korea is cut off from the Internet, much as it is from other areas with respect to the world. Only a few hundred thousand citizens in North Korea, representing about 4% of the total population, have access to the Internet, which is heavily censored by the national government. According to the RWB, North Korea is a prime example where all mediums of communication are controlled by the government. According to the RWB, the Internet is used by the North Korean government primarily to spread propaganda. The North Korean network is monitored heavily. All websites are under government control, as is all other media in North Korea.

=== Oman ===
- Listed as pervasive in the social area, as substantial in Internet tools, selective in political, and as no evidence in conflict/security by ONI in August 2009.

Oman engages in extensive filtering of pornographic Web sites, gay and lesbian content, content that is critical of Islam, content about illegal drugs, and anonymizer sites used to circumvent blocking. There is no evidence of technical filtering of political content, but laws and regulations restrict free expression online and encourage self-censorship.

=== Pakistan ===
- Rated "partly free" by Freedom House in Freedom on the Net in 2011 (score 55) and as "not free" in 2012 (score 63), 2013 (score 67), 2014 (score 69), 2015 (score 69), 2016 (score 69) 2017 (score 71), and 2018 (score 73).
- Listed as substantial in the conflict/security and as selective in the political, social, and Internet tools areas by ONI in 2011.
- Listed as an Internet Enemy by RWB in 2014.

Pakistanis currently have free access to a wide range of Internet content, including most sexual, political, social, and religious sites on the Internet. Internet filtering remains both inconsistent and intermittent. Although the majority of filtering in Pakistan is intermittent—such as the occasional block on a major Web site like Blogspot or YouTube—the Pakistan Telecommunication Authority (PTA) continues to block sites containing content it considers to be blasphemous, anti-Islamic, or threatening to internal security. Pakistan has blocked access to websites critical of the government.

According to a 2025 report by Amnesty International, Pakistani authorities had escalated internet censorship and mass surveillance, targeting over four million citizens. Tools like the Lawful Intercept Management System (LIMS) were used to monitor digital activity via local telecoms, while the Web Monitoring System (WMS) enabled content blocking, throttling, and internet shutdowns. Since the 2016 passage of the Prevention of Electronic Crimes Act (PECA), over 1.4 million URLs had been blocked, often without user notice. The report criticized the opaque regulation process and recorded 77 internet shutdowns from 2016 to 2024, including 24 in 2024 alone.

=== Qatar ===
- Listed as pervasive in the social and Internet tools areas and selective in political and conflict/security by ONI in August 2009.

Qatar is the second most connected country in the Arab region, but Internet users have heavily censored access to the Internet. Qatar filters pornography, political criticism of Gulf countries, gay and lesbian content, sexual health resources, dating and escort services, and privacy and circumvention tools. Political filtering is highly selective, but journalists self-censor on sensitive issues such as government policies, Islam, and the ruling family.

=== Saudi Arabia ===
- Rated "not free" by Freedom House in Freedom on the Net in 2011 (score 70), 2012 (score 71), 2013 (score 70), 2014 (score 72), 2015 (score 73), 2016 (score 72), 2017 (score 72), and 2018 (score 73).
- Listed as pervasive in the social and Internet tools areas, as substantial in political, and as selective in conflict/security by ONI in August 2009.
- Listed as an Internet enemy by RWB in 2011.

Saudi Arabia directs all international Internet traffic through a proxy run by the CITC. Content filtering is implemented there using software by Secure Computing. Additionally, a number of sites are blocked according to two lists maintained by the Internet Services Unit (ISU): one containing "immoral" (mostly pornographic) sites, the other based on directions from a security committee run by the Ministry of Interior (including sites critical of the Saudi government). Citizens are encouraged to actively report "immoral" sites for blocking, using a provided Web form. Many Wikipedia articles in different languages have been included in the censorship of "immoral" content in Saudi Arabia. The legal basis for content-filtering is the resolution by Council of Ministers dated 12 February 2001. According to a study carried out in 2004 by the OpenNet Initiative: "The most aggressive censorship focused on pornography, drug use, gambling, religious conversion of Muslims, and filtering circumvention tools."

=== Syria ===
- Rated "not free" in Freedom on the Net by Freedom House in 2012 (score 83), 2013 (score 85), 2014 (score 88), 2015 (score 87), 2016 (score 87), 2017 (score 86), and 2018 (score 83).
- Listed as pervasive in the political and Internet tools areas, and as selective in social and conflict/security by ONI in August 2009.
- Listed as an Enemy of the Internet by RWB in 2011.
- Listed as a State Enemy of the Internet by RWB in 2013 for involvement in active, intrusive surveillance of news providers, resulting in grave violations of freedom of information and human rights.

Syria has banned websites for political reasons and arrested people accessing them. In addition to filtering a wide range of Web content, the Syrian government monitors Internet use very closely and has detained citizens "for expressing their opinions or reporting information online." Vague and broadly worded laws invite government abuse and have prompted Internet users to engage in self-censoring and self-monitoring to avoid the state's ambiguous grounds for arrest.

During the Syrian civil war Internet connectivity between Syria and the outside world shut down in late November 2011 and again in early May 2013.

=== Turkmenistan ===
- Listed as pervasive in the political area and as selective in social, conflict/security, and Internet tools by ONI in December 2010.
- Listed as an Internet enemy by RWB in 2011.

Internet usage in Turkmenistan is under tight control of the government. Turkmen got their news through satellite television until 2008 when the government decided to get rid of satellites, leaving Internet as the only medium where information could be gathered. The Internet is monitored thoroughly by the government and websites run by human rights organizations and news agencies are blocked. Attempts to get around this censorship can lead to grave consequences.

=== United Arab Emirates ===
- Rated "not free" by Freedom House in Freedom on the Net in 2013 (score 66), 2014 (score 67), 2015 (score 68), 2016 (score 68), 2017 (score 69), and 2018 (score 69).
- Listed as pervasive in the social and Internet tools areas, as substantial in political, and as selective in conflict/security by ONI in August 2009.
- Listed as Under Surveillance by RWB in 2011.

The United Arab Emirates forcibly censors the Internet using Secure Computing's solution. The nation's ISPs Etisalat and du ban pornography, politically sensitive material, all Israeli domains, and anything against the perceived moral values of the UAE. All or most VoIP services are blocked. The Emirates Discussion Forum (Arabic: منتدى الحوار الإماراتي), or simply uaehewar.net, has been subjected to multiple censorship actions by UAE authorities.

=== Uzbekistan ===
- Rated "not free" in Freedom on the Net from Freedom House in 2012 (score 77), 2013 (score 78), 2014 (score 79), 2015 (score 78), 2016 (score 79), 2017 (score 77), and 2018 (score 75).
- Uzbekistan has been listed as an Internet enemy by Reporters Without Borders since the list was created in 2006.
- The OpenNet Initiative found evidence that Internet filtering was pervasive in the political area and selective in the social, conflict/security, and Internet tools areas during testing that was reported in 2008 and 2010.

Uzbekistan maintains the most extensive and pervasive filtering system among the CIS countries. It prevents access to websites regarding banned Islamic movements, independent media, NGOs, material critical of the government's human rights violations, discussion of the events in Egypt, Tunisia, and Bahrain, and news about demonstrations and protest movements. Contributors to online discussion of the events in Egypt, Tunisia, and Bahrain have been arrested. Some Internet cafes in the capital have posted warnings that users will be fined for viewing pornographic websites or website containing banned political material. The main VoIP protocols SIP and IAX used to be blocked for individual users; however, as of July 2010, blocks were no longer in place. Facebook was blocked for few days in 2010.

=== Vietnam ===
- Rated "not free" by Freedom House in Freedom on the Net in 2011 (score 73), 2012 (score 73), 2013 (score 75), 2014 (score 76), 2015 (score 76), 2016 (score 76), 2017 (score 76), and 2018 (score 76).
- Classified by ONI as pervasive in the political, as substantial in the Internet tools, and as selective in the social and conflict/security areas in 2011.
- Listed as an Enemy of the Internet by RWB in 2011.
- Listed as a State Enemy of the Internet by RWB in 2013 for involvement in active, intrusive surveillance of news providers, resulting in grave violations of freedom of information and human rights.

The main networks in Vietnam prevent access to websites critical of the Vietnamese government, expatriate political parties, and international human rights organizations, among others. Online police reportedly monitor Internet cafes and cyber dissidents have been imprisoned for advocating democracy.

== Substantial censorship or surveillance ==
=== Burma ===
- Rated "not free" by Freedom House in Freedom on the Net in 2011 (score 88), 2012 (score 75), and 2013 (score 62), as "partly free" in 2014 (score 60), and "not free" in 2015 (score 63), 2016 (score 61), 2017 (score 63), and 2018 (score 64).
- Listed as selective in the political and Internet tools areas, as substantial in social, and as no evidence of filtering in conflict/security by ONI in August 2012.
- Listed as an Internet enemy by RWB from 2006 to 2013.

Beginning in September 2012, after years spent as one of the world's most strictly controlled information environments, the government of Burma (Myanmar) began to open up access to previously censored online content. Independent and foreign news sites, oppositional political content, and sites with content relating to human rights and political reform—all previously blocked—became accessible. In August 2012, the Burmese Press Scrutiny and Registration Department announced that all pre-publication censorship of the press was to be discontinued, such that articles dealing with religion and politics would no longer require review by the government before publication.

Restrictions on content deemed harmful to state security remain in place. Pornography is still widely blocked, as is content relating to alcohol and drugs, gambling websites, online dating sites, sex education, gay and lesbian content, and web censorship circumvention tools. In 2012 almost all of the previously blocked websites of opposition political parties, critical political content, and independent news sites were accessible, with only 5 of 541 tested URLs categorized as political content blocked.

=== Indonesia ===
- Rated "partly free" in Freedom on the Net in 2011 (score 46), 2012 (score 42), 2013 (score 41), 2014 (score 42), 2015 (score 42), 2016 (score 44), 2017 (score 47), and 2018 (score 46).
- Listed as substantial in the social area, as selective in the political and Internet tools areas, and as no evidence of filtering in the conflict/security area by ONI in 2011 based on testing done during 2009 and 2010. Testing also showed that Internet filtering in Indonesia is unsystematic and inconsistent, illustrated by the differences found in the level of filtering between ISPs.

Although the government of Indonesia holds a positive view about the Internet as a means for economic development, it has become increasingly concerned over the effect of access to information and has demonstrated an interest in increasing its control over offensive online content, particularly pornographic and discriminatory (e.g. anti-Chinese or anti-Christianity and Christians) online content, as well as contents supporting and encouraging Islamic fundamentalism (namely pro-caliphate) and Islamic terrorism. The government regulates such content through legal and regulatory frameworks as well as partnerships with ISPs and Internet cafés.

=== Kazakhstan ===
- Rated "partly free" by Freedom House in Freedom on the Net in 2011 (score 55), 2012 (score 58), 2013 (score 59), 2014 (score 60), and "not free" in 2015 (score 61), 2016 (score 63), 2017 (score 62), and 2018 (score 62).
- Listed as selective in the political and social areas and as no evidence in conflict/security and Internet tools by ONI in December 2010.
- Listed as Under Surveillance by RWB in 2012.

In 2011 the government responded to an oil worker's strike, a major riot, a wave of bombings, and the president's ailing health by imposing new, repressive Internet regulations, greater control of information, especially online information, blocking of news websites, and cutting communications with the city of Zhanaozen during the riot.

On 9 May 2019, Victory Day, internet observatory NetBlocks reported a half-day nationwide blanket ban across Kazakhstan of Facebook, YouTube and Instagram as well as various independent news media websites. The restrictions were implemented after opposition groups called for rallies in the run up to presidential elections that will elect a successor for Nursultan Nazarbayev.

Kazakhstan uses its significant regulatory authority to ensure that all Internet traffic passes through infrastructure controlled by the dominant telecommunications provider KazakhTelecom. Selective content filtering is widely used, and second- and third-generation control strategies are evident. Independent media and bloggers reportedly practice self-censorship for fear of government reprisal. The technical sophistication of the Kazakhstan Internet environment is evolving and the government's tendency toward stricter online controls warrant closer examination and monitoring.

=== Palestine ===
- Listed as substantial in the social area and as no evidence in political, conflict/security, and Internet tools by ONI in August 2009.

Access to Internet in the Palestinian territories remains relatively open, although social filtering of sexually explicit content has been implemented in Palestine. Internet in the West Bank remains almost entirely unfiltered, save for a single news Web site that was banned for roughly six months starting in late 2008. Media freedom is constrained in Palestine and the West Bank by the political upheaval and internal conflict as well as by the Israeli forces.

=== South Korea ===
- Rated "partly free" in Freedom on the Net by Freedom House in 2011 (score 32), 2012 (score 34), 2013 (score 32), 2014 (score 33), 2015 (score 34), 2016 (score 36), 2017 (score 35), and 2018 (score 36).
- Listed as pervasive in the conflict/security area, as selective in social, and as no evidence in political and Internet tools by ONI in 2011.
- Listed as Under Surveillance by RWB in 2011.

South Korea is a world leader in Internet and broadband penetration, but its citizens do not have access to a free and unfiltered Internet. South Korea's government maintains a wide-ranging approach toward the regulation of specific online content and imposes a substantial level of censorship on elections-related discourse and on a large number of Web sites that the government deems subversive or socially harmful. The policies are particularly strong toward suppressing anonymity in the Korean internet.

In 2007, numerous bloggers were censored and their posts deleted by police for expressing criticism of, or even support for, presidential candidates. This even led to some bloggers being arrested by the police.

South Korea uses IP address blocking to ban web sites considered sympathetic to North Korea. Illegal websites, such as those offering unrated games, file sharing, pornography, and gambling, are also blocked. Any attempts to bypass this is enforced with the "three-strikes" program.

In 2019, South Korean Government adopted an enhanced online filtering system using "SNI Field Interception," which allows the Korean Communications Commission to block HTTPS encrypted websites. This issue is currently causing strong resistance from Korean internet users.

=== Thailand ===
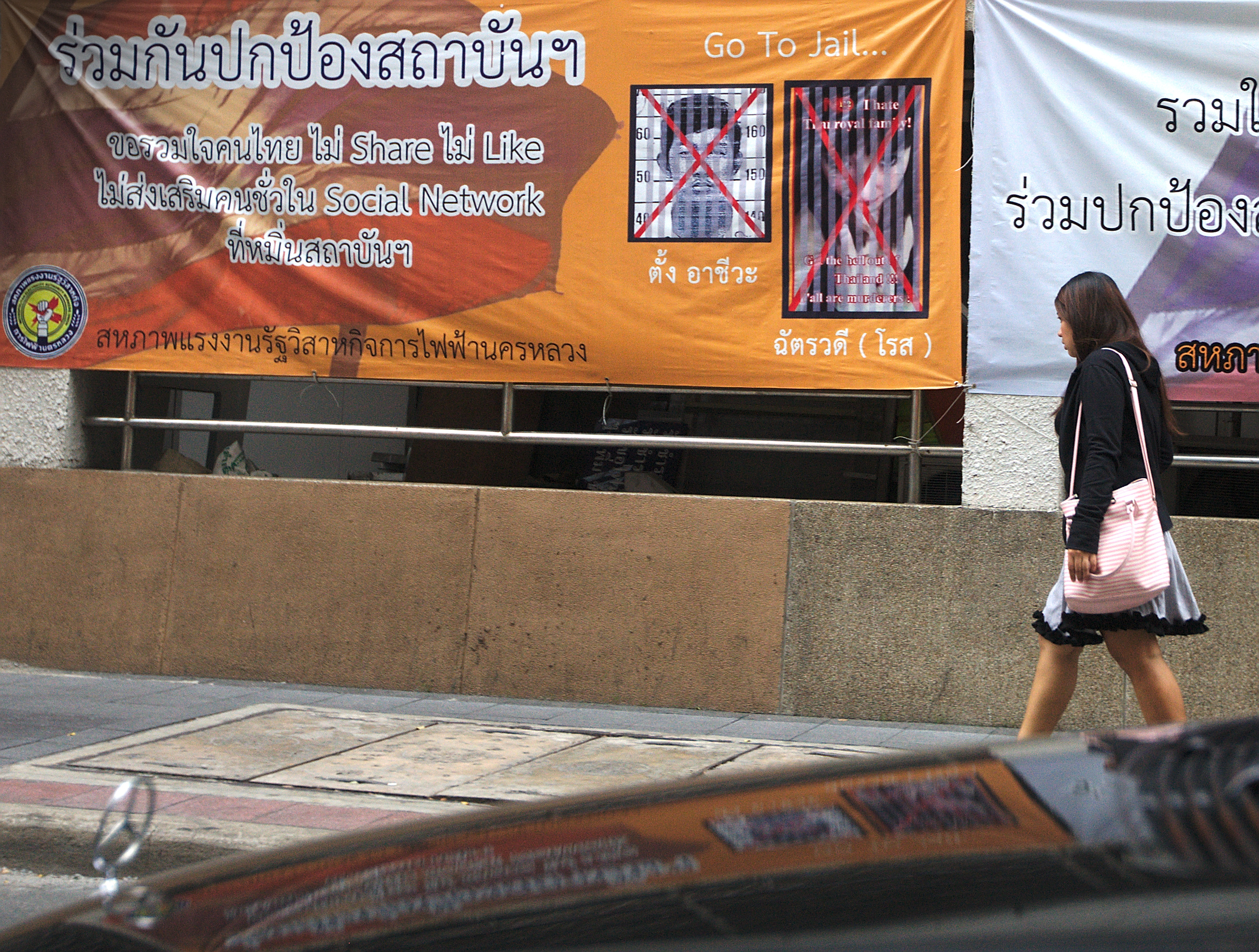
Banner in Bangkok, observed on the 30th of June 2014 during the 2014 Thai coup d'état, informing the Thai public that 'like' or 'share' activity on social media can be punished by up to imprisonment.

- Rated "not free" in Freedom on the Net by Freedom House in 2011–2012 (scores 61 and 61) and 2014–2018 (scores 62, 63, 66, 67, and 65). Freedom House listed Thailand as "partly free" in 2013 (score 60), due partially to improvements in access to the Internet.
- Listed as selective in political, social, and Internet tools and as no evidence in conflict/security by ONI in 2011.
- Listed as Under Surveillance by RWB in 2011.

Prior to the September 2006 military coup d'état most Internet censorship in Thailand was focused on blocking pornographic websites. The following years have seen a constant stream of sometimes violent protests, regional unrest, emergency decrees, a new cybercrimes law, and an updated Internal Security Act. And year by year Internet censorship has grown, with its focus shifting to lèse majesté, national security, and political issues. Estimates put the number of websites blocked at over 110,000 and growing in 2010.

The national constitution provides for freedom of expression and press as "regulated by law"; but, the government imposes overwhelming limitations on these rights. As of 2020, around 52% of Thailand's population used the Internet, thus making Internet more of a means of expression.

Reasons for blocking:

Prior to 2006	2010	Reason
11%	77%	lèse majesté content (content that defames, insults, threatens, or is unflattering to the King, includes national security and some political issues)
60%	22%	pornographic content
2%	<1%	content related to gambling
27%	<1%	copyright infringement, illegal products and services, illegal drugs, sales of sex equipment, prostitution, ...

According to the Associated Press, the Computer Crime Act has contributed to a sharp increase in the number of lèse majesté cases tried each year in Thailand. While between 1990 and 2005, roughly five cases were tried in Thai courts each year, since that time about 400 cases have come to trial.

=== Turkey ===
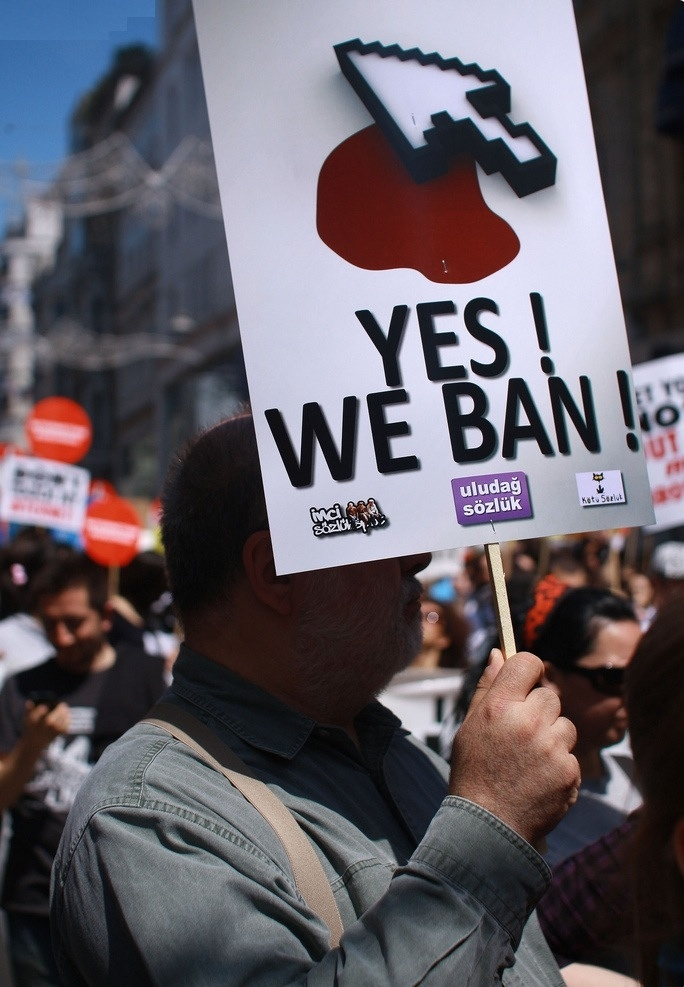
2011 protests against Internet censorship in Turkey

- Rated "partly free" in Freedom on the Net by Freedom House in 2009 and 2011–2015 (scores 42, 45, 46, 49, 55, and 58) and "not free" in 2016–2018 (scores 61, 66, and 66).
- Listed as selective in the political, social, and Internet tools areas and as no evidence of filtering in the conflict/security area by ONI in December 2010.
- Listed as under surveillance by RWB since 2010.

The Turkish government has implemented legal and institutional reforms driven by the country's ambitions to become a European Union member state, while at the same time demonstrating its high sensitivity to defamation and other inappropriate online content, which has resulted in the closure of a number of local and international Web sites. In October 2010, a ban on YouTube was lifted, but a range of IP addresses used by Google remained blocked, thus access to Google Apps hosted sites, including all Google App Engine powered sites and some of the Google services, remained blocked. All Internet traffic passes through Türk Telekom's infrastructure, allowing centralized control over online content and facilitating the implementation of shutdown decisions.

Many minor and major websites in Turkey are subject to censorship. Web sites are blocked for intellectual property infringement, particularly file-sharing and streaming sites; for providing access to material that shows or promotes the sexual exploitation and abuse of children, obscenity, prostitution, or gambling; for insults to Mustafa Kemal Atatürk, the founding father of modern Turkey; for reporting news on southeastern Turkey and Kurdish issues; or which defame individuals. In addition to widespread filtering, state authorities are proactive in requesting the deletion or removal of content online. As of June 2010 more than 8000 major and minor websites were banned, most of them pornographic and mp3 sharing sites. By 2013 the number of blocked sites had grown to slightly under 30,000. Among the web sites banned are the prominent sites YouPorn, Megaupload, Tagged, Slide, and ShoutCast. However, blocked sites are often available using proxies or by changing DNS servers. The Internet Movie Database escaped being blocked due to a misspelling of its domain name, resulting in a futile ban on www.imbd.com.

Under new regulations announced on 22 February 2011 and scheduled to go into effect on 22 August 2011, the Information Technologies Board (BTK), an offshoot of the prime minister's office, will require that all computers select one of four levels of content filtering (family, children, domestic, or standard) in order to gain access to the Internet.

In its 2013 Freedom on the Net report, Freedom House says:

- that government censorship of the Internet is relatively common and has increased steadily over recent years;
- that authorities added several thousand websites to its blocking list, increasing the total to almost 30,000;
- that the European Court of Human Rights found Turkey in violation of Article 10 of the European Convention on Human Rights for blocking access to the hosting platform Google Sites; and
- several users received fines, prison time, or suspended sentences for comments made on social media sites.

In 2013 social media sites were banned in Turkey after the Taksim Gezi Park protests. Both Twitter and YouTube were closed by a decision of the Turkish court. And a new law, passed by Turkish Parliament, granted immunity to Turkey's Telecommunications Directorate (TİB) personnel. The TİB was also given the authority to block access to specific websites without the need for a court order.

On 20 March 2014, access to Twitter was blocked when a court ordered that "protection measures" be applied to the service. This followed earlier remarks by Prime Minister Tayyip Erdogan who vowed to "wipe out Twitter" following damaging allegations of corruption in his inner circle.

On 10 October 2015, following the first of two bombings in Ankara, censorship monitoring organization Turkey Blocks corroborated user reports that Turkey intentionally restricted access to Twitter in an apparent attempt to control the flow of information relating to the attack.

In October 2016, Turkish authorities intermittently blocked all Internet access in the east and southeast of the country after detaining the elected co-mayors of the city of Diyarbakır.

On 4 November 2016, Turkish authorities blocked access to Facebook, Twitter, YouTube and WhatsApp in the country, following the detention of 11 Free Democratic Party (HDP) members of parliament. Internet restrictions are increasingly being used to suppress coverage of political incidents, a form of censorship deployed at short notice to prevent civil unrest.

On 29 April 2017, authorities has started blocking access to all Wikipedia sites, without citing a particular legal foundation. The Turkish government allegedly demands that the Wikimedia should comply with the international laws, refrain from negative propaganda against Turkey, set up a local chapter and comply with the local court orders.

== Selective censorship or surveillance ==
=== Afghanistan ===
The internet in Afghanistan has sometimes been subject to broad bans under its Taliban governments, which lack the technical capability for selective filtering of content, to enforce morality laws. Most recently, fiber optic cables were cut by the Afghanistan Telecom Regulatory Authority in September 2025, on the orders of Supreme Leader Hibatullah Akhundzada, who said the internet was not necessary and had been successfully banned under Mullah Omar's rule. However, the ban was reversed within days without explanation. Spokesman Zabihullah Mujahid had previously said there was a desire to install filters to censor content, but that they were too expensive to implement. Any installation of filters is expected to take years. OpenNet had previously listed Afghanistan under Omar's ban. Afghanistan does not receive any internet ranking by Freedom House.

Under the Islamic Republic of Afghanistan, Afghanistan was listed by ONI as having no evidence of censorship in all four areas (political, social, conflict/security, and Internet tools) in 2007. At this point, only about 0.1% of Afghans were online, thus limiting Internet access as a means of expression. Freedom of expression was inviolable under the 2004 Constitution of Afghanistan, and every Afghan had the right to print or publish topics without prior submission to state authorities. However, the limits of the law were clear: under the Constitution no law could be contrary to the beliefs and provisions of the religion of Islam. The December 2005 Media Law includes bans on four broad content categories: the publication of news contrary to Islam and other religions; slanderous or insulting materials concerning individuals; matters contrary to the Afghan Constitution or criminal law; and the exposure of the identities of victims of violence. Proposed additions to the law would ban content jeopardizing stability, national security, and territorial integrity of Afghanistan; false information that might disrupt public opinion; promotion of any religion other than Islam; and "material which might damage physical well-being, psychological and moral security of people, especially children and the youth. The Electronic Frontier Foundation (EFF) reported that the Afghan Ministry of Communications mandated in June 2010 that all Internet Service Providers (ISPs) in Afghanistan filter Facebook, Gmail, Twitter, YouTube and websites related to alcohol, gambling and sex. They were also blocking websites found to be "immoral" and against the traditions of the Afghan people. However, executives at Afghan ISPs said this was the result of a mistaken announcement by Ariana Network Service, one of the country's largest ISPs. An executive there said that while the government intends to censor pornographic content and gambling sites, social networking sites and email services are not slated for filtering. As of July 2010, enforcement of Afghanistan's restrictions on "immoral" content was limited, with internet executives saying the government didn't have the technical capacity to filter internet traffic.

=== Azerbaijan ===
- Rated "partly free" by Freedom House in Freedom on the Net in 2011 (score 48), 2012 (score 50), 2013 (score 52), 2014 (score 55), and 2015 (score 56).
- Listed as selective in the political and social areas and as no evidence in conflict/security and Internet tools by ONI in November 2009.

The Internet in Azerbaijan remains largely free from direct censorship, although there is evidence of second- and third-generation controls.

=== Bangladesh ===
- Rated "partly free" by Freedom House in Freedom on the Net in 2013 (score 49), 2014 (score 49), 2015 (score 51), 2016 (score 56), and 2017 (score 54).
- No evidence of filtering found by ONI in 2011.

Although Internet access in Bangladesh is not restricted by a national level filtering regime, the state has intervened to block Web sites for hosting anti-Islamic content and content deemed subversive. Internet content is regulated by existing legal frameworks that restrict material deemed defamatory or offensive, as well as content that might challenge law and order.

The Bangla blogging platform Sachalayatan was reported to be inaccessible on 15 July 2008, and was forced to migrate to a new IP address. Although the blocking was not officially confirmed, Sachalayatan was likely Bangladesh's inaugural filtering event. YouTube was blocked for a few days in March 2009 in order to protect the "national interest". The disputed video covered a partial audio recording of a meeting between the prime minister and military officials, who were angry at the government's handling of a mutiny by border guards in Dhaka that left more than seventy people dead.

Facebook was blocked by the Bangladesh Telecommunication Regulatory Commission (BTRC) for 7 days starting on 29 May 2010 because of "obnoxious images", including depictions of Mohammed and several of the country's political officials as well as links to pornographic sites. The block was lifted after Facebook agreed to remove the offensive content. During the same period a 30-year-old man was arrested in the Bangladeshi capital on charges of uploading satiric images of some political leaders on Facebook.

The BTRC again blocked YouTube access in September 2012 after Google, Inc. ignored requests to remove the controversial film, Innocence of Muslims, from the site.

On 16 May 2013 BTRC asked the international internet gateway operators to reduce the upload bandwidth of ISPs by 75% in an effort to prevent illegal VoIP. There is speculation that the bandwidth reduction is actually an effort to make it difficult for people to upload 'problematic' videos, images, TV talk show clips, etc. in the social media.

Websites ranging from gaming websites to pornographic websites, as well as certain social websites are blocked in Bangladesh.

=== Bhutan ===
Individuals and groups are generally permitted to engage in peaceful expression of views via the Internet. Government officials state that the government does not block access, restrict content, or censor Web sites. However, Freedom House reports the government occasionally blocks access to Web sites containing pornography or information deemed offensive to the state; but that such blocked information typically does not extend to political content. In its Freedom of the Press 2012 report, Freedom House described high levels of self-censorship among media practitioners, despite few reports of official intimidation or threats.

The constitution provides for freedom of speech including for members of the press, and the government generally respects these rights in practice. Citizens can publicly and privately criticize the government without reprisal. The constitution states that persons "shall not be subjected to arbitrary or unlawful interference with his or her privacy, family, home, or correspondence, nor to unlawful attacks on the person's honor and reputation", and the government generally respects these prohibitions.

=== Cambodia ===
- Rated "partly free" in Freedom on the Net by Freedom House in 2013 (score 47), 2014 (score 47), and 2015 (score 48).

Compared to traditional media in Cambodia, new media, including online news, social networks and personal blogs, enjoy more freedom and independence from government censorship and restrictions. However, the government does proactively block blogs and websites, either on moral grounds, or for hosting content deemed critical of the government. The government restricts access to sexually explicit content, but does not systematically censor online political discourse. Since 2011 three blogs hosted overseas have been blocked for perceived antigovernment content. In 2012, government ministries threatened to shutter internet cafes too near schools—citing moral concerns—and instituted surveillance of cafe premises and cell phone subscribers as a security measure.

There are no government restrictions on access to the Internet or credible reports that the government monitors e-mail or Internet chat rooms without appropriate legal authority. During 2012 NGOs expressed concern about potential online restrictions. In February and November, the government published two circulars, which, if implemented fully, would require Internet cafes to install surveillance cameras and restrict operations within major urban centers. Activists also reported concern about a draft "cybercrimes" law, noting that it could be used to restrict online freedoms. The government maintained it would only regulate criminal activity.

=== Georgia ===
- Rated "partly free" by Freedom House in Freedom on the Net in 2009 (score 43) and 2011 (score 35) and "free" in 2012 (score 30), 2013 (score 26), 2014 (score 26), and 2015 (score 24).
- Listed as selective in the political and conflict/security areas and as no evidence in social and Internet tools by ONI in November 2010.

Access to Internet content in Georgia is largely unrestricted as the legal constitutional framework, developed after the 2003 Rose Revolution, established a series of provisions that should, in theory, curtail any attempts by the state to censor the Internet. At the same time, these legal instruments have not been sufficient to prevent limited filtering on corporate and educational networks. Georgia's dependence on international connectivity makes it vulnerable to upstream filtering, evident in the March 2008 blocking of YouTube by Türk Telekom.

Georgia blocked all websites with addresses ending in .ru (top-level domain for Russian Federation) during the Russo-Georgian War in 2008.

=== India ===
- Rated "partly free" in Freedom on the Net by Freedom House in 2009 (score 34), 2011 (score 36), 2012 (score 39), 2013 (score 47), 2014 (score 42), and 2015 (score 40).
- Listed as selective in all areas by ONI in 2011.
- Listed as Under Surveillance by RWB in 2012 and 2013 and as an Internet Enemy in 2014.

Since the Mumbai bombings of 2008, the Indian authorities have stepped up Internet surveillance and pressure on technical service providers, while publicly rejecting accusations of censorship.

ONI describes India as:

A stable democracy with a strong tradition of press freedom, [that] nevertheless continues its regime of Internet filtering. However, India's selective censorship of blogs and other content, often under the guise of security, has also been met with significant opposition.

Indian ISPs continue to selectively filter Web sites identified by authorities. However, government attempts at filtering have not been entirely effective because blocked content has quickly migrated to other Web sites and users have found ways to circumvent filtering. The government has also been criticized for a poor understanding of the technical feasibility of censorship and for haphazardly choosing which Web sites to block.

=== Jordan ===
- Rated "partly free" by Freedom House in Freedom on the Net in 2011 (score 42), 2012 (score 45), 2013 (score 46), 2014 (score 48), and 2015 (score 50).
- Listed as selective in the political area and as no evidence in social, conflict/security, and Internet tools by ONI in August 2009.

Censorship in Jordan is relatively light, with filtering selectively applied to only a small number of sites. However, media laws and regulations encourage some measure of self-censorship in cyberspace, and citizens have reportedly been questioned and arrested for Web content they have authored. Censorship in Jordan is mainly focused on political issues that might be seen as a threat to national security due to the nation's close proximity to regional hotspots like Israel, Iraq, Lebanon, and the Palestinian territories.

In 2013, the Press and Publications Department initiated a ban on Jordanian news websites which had not registered and been licensed by government agency. The order issued to Telecommunication Regulatory Commission contained a list of over 300 websites to be blocked. The new law, which enforced registration of websites, would also hold online news sites accountable for the comments left by their readers. They would also be required to archive all comments for at least six months.

In 2016, the Internet Archive was blocked, however it was unblocked later.

=== Kyrgyzstan ===
- Rated "partly free" by Freedom House in Freedom on the Net 2012 (score 35), 2013 (score 35), 2014 (score 34), and 2015 (score 35).
- Listed as selective in the political and social areas and as no evidence in conflict/security and Internet tools by ONI in December 2010.

Access to the Internet in Kyrgyzstan has deteriorated as heightened political tensions have led to more frequent instances of second- and third-generation controls. The government has become more sensitive to the Internet's influence on domestic politics and enacted laws that increase its authority to regulate the sector.

Liberalization of the telecommunications market in Kyrgyzstan has made the Internet affordable for the majority of the population. However, Kyrgyzstan is an effectively cyberlocked country dependent on purchasing bandwidth from Kazakhstan and Russia. The increasingly authoritarian regime in Kazakhstan is shifting toward more restrictive Internet controls, which is leading to instances of upstream filtering affecting ISPs in Kyrgyzstan.

=== Lebanon ===
- Rated as "partly free" in Freedom on the Net reports by Freedom House in 2013 (score 45), 2014 (score 47), 2015 (score 45), 2016 (score 45), and 2017 (score 46).
- Listed as no evidence in all four areas (political, social, conflict/security, and Internet tools) by ONI in August 2009.

Internet traffic in Lebanon is barely controlled. There is no surveillance, but a handful of websites have been blocked. The sites blocked relate to gambling, child pornography, prostitution services, and a few Israeli websites. The blocking is incredibly basic however, covering very few relevant websites, is sometimes done in error, and can be easily bypassed without a need for a VPN for the websites actually blocked.

Only internet provided from the Ogero Government ISP has the restrictions, all websites with no exceptions are unblocked on other ISPs.

=== Malaysia ===
- Rated "partly free" by Freedom House in Freedom on the Net in 2009 (score 41), 2011 (score 41), 2012 (score 43), 2013 (score 44), 2014 (score 42), and 2015 (score 43).
- Listed as no evidence in the political, social, conflict/security, and Internet tools areas by ONI in May 2007.
- Listed as under surveillance by RWB in 2008, 2009, and from 2011 to the present.

There have been mixed messages and confusion regarding Internet censorship in Malaysia. Internet content is officially uncensored, and civil liberties assured, though on numerous occasions the former government (1957–2018) has been accused of filtering politically sensitive sites. Any act that curbs internet freedom is theoretically contrary to the Multimedia Act signed by the government of Malaysia in the 1990s. However, websites containing content deemed illegal by law such as copyright infringement, online gambling and pornography are subject to blocking done through injection of DNS block pages by Malaysian ISPs. Pervasive state controls on traditional media spill over to the Internet at times, leading to self-censorship and reports that the state investigates and harasses bloggers and cyber-dissidents.

In April 2011, prime minister Najib Razak repeated promises that Malaysia will never censor the Internet.

On 11 June, however, the Malaysian Communications and Multimedia Commission (MCMC) ordered ISPs to block 10 websites for violating the Copyright Act. This led to the creation of a new Facebook page, "1M Malaysians Don't Want SKMM Block File Sharing Website".

In May 2013, leading up to the 13th Malaysian General Election, there were reports of access to YouTube videos critical of the Barisan National Government and to pages of Pakatan Rakyat political leaders in Facebook being blocked. Analysis of the network traffic showed that ISPs were scanning the headers and actively blocking requests for the videos and Facebook pages.

In April 2018, the 13th Cabinet of Malaysia, just a few weeks short of dissolution, tabled a new law called the Anti-Fake News Bill, in efforts to curb freedom of speech on social media, with fear that they would lose the upcoming general elections.

In May 2018, after the 2018 General Elections, as the 60-year rule of Barisan Nasional came to an end with a Pakatan Harapan win, freedom of speech on social media increased greatly and it was announced that laws oppressing freedom of expression would be either repealed or abolished.

In July 2018, the Malaysian police announced the creation of the Malaysian Internet Crime Against Children Investigation Unit (Micac) that is equipped with real-time mass internet surveillance software developed in the United States and is tasked with the monitoring of all Malaysian internet users, with a focus on pornography and child pornography. The system creates a "data library" of users which includes details such as IP addresses, websites, locations, duration and frequency of use and files uploaded and downloaded.

=== Philippines ===
- Rated "free" by Freedom House in Freedom on the Net in 2012 (score 23), 2013 (score 25), 2014 (score 27), 2015 (score 27), 2016 (score 26), 2017 (score 28), and as "partly free" in 2018 (score 31).
- There is no ONI country profile for the Philippines, but it is included in the ONI Regional Overview for Asia and the ONI global Internet filtering maps show no evidence of filtering in the political, social, conflict/security, and Internet tools areas.

The constitution provides for freedom of speech and of the press, and the government generally respects these rights. There are no government restrictions on access to the Internet or reports that the government monitors e-mail or Internet chat rooms. Individuals and groups engage in peaceful expressions of views via the Internet, including by e-mail. Internet access is widely available. According to International Telecommunication Union statistics for 2009, approximately 6.5 percent of the country's inhabitants used the Internet.

In 2012 the Republic Act No. 10175 or Cybercrime Prevention Act of 2012 was signed by President Benigno Aquino, which criminalizes acts such as libel done online that are already punishable in other media such as radio, TV, and newspapers, with punishment one level higher than their non-computer counterpart. The Act was greatly endorsed by Senator Tito Sotto, who said that he was cyberbullied because he allegedly plagiarized bloggers and Sen. Robert F. Kennedy. After several petitions submitted to the Supreme Court questioned the constitutionality of the Act, on 9 October 2012, the Supreme Court issued a temporary restraining order, stopping implementation of the Act for 120 days, and extended it on 5 February 2013 "until further orders from the court."

On 14 January 2017, the two popular pornographic websites Pornhub and XVideos were blocked in the Philippines as part of the implementation of Republic Act 9775 or the Anti-Child Pornography Law. However, there are some ISPs in the country where porn websites are still accessible. The government continues to block websites that contains child pornography.

=== Singapore ===
- Rated "partly free" by Freedom House in Freedom on the Net in 2014 (score 40) and 2015 (score 41).
- Listed as selective in the social area and as no evidence in political, conflict/security, and Internet tools by ONI in May 2007.

The Republic of Singapore engages in the Internet filtering, blocking only the original set of 100 mass-impactable websites. However, the state employs a combination of licensing controls and legal pressures to regulate Internet access and to limit the presence of objectionable content and conduct online.

In 2005 and 2006 three people were arrested and charged with sedition for posting racist comments on the Internet, of which two have been sentenced to imprisonment.

The Media Development Authority maintains a confidential list of blocked websites that are inaccessible within the country. The Media Development Authority exerts control over all the ISPs to ensure it is not accessible unless there is an extension called "Go Away MDA".

On 8 October 2012, the NTUC executive director, Amy Cheong was fired after posting racist comments on the Internet.

In July 2014, the government made plans to block The Pirate Bay and 45 file sharing websites, after the Copyright Act 2014 was amended.

=== Sri Lanka ===
- Rated "partly free" by Freedom House in Freedom on the Net in 2012 (score 55), 2013 (score 58), 2014 (score 58), and 2015 (score 47).
- Classified by ONI as no evidence of filtering in 2009. There is no individual ONI country profile for Sri Lanka, but it is included in the regional overview for Asia.
- Listed as Under Surveillance by RWB in 2008, 2009, and from 2011 to the present.

Several political and news websites, including tamilnet.com and lankanewsweb.com have been blocked within the country. The Sri Lanka courts have ordered hundreds of adult sites blocked to "protect women and children".

In October and November 2011 the Sri Lankan Telecommunication Regulatory Commission blocked the five websites, www.lankaenews.com, srilankamirror.com, srilankaguardian.com, paparacigossip9.com, and www.lankawaynews.com, for what the government alleges as publishing reports that amount to "character assassination and violating individual privacy" and damaging the character of President Mahinda Rajapaksa, ministers and senior government officials. The five sites have published material critical of the government and alleged corruption and malfeasance by politicians.

=== Tajikistan ===
- Listed as selective in the political area and as no evidence as in social, conflict/security, and Internet tools by ONI in December 2010.

Internet penetration remains low in Tajikistan because of widespread poverty and the relatively high cost of Internet access. Internet access remains largely unrestricted, but emerging second-generation controls have threatened to erode these freedoms just as Internet penetration is starting to affect political life in the country. In the run-up to the 2006 presidential elections, ISPs were asked to voluntarily censor access to an opposition Web site, and other second-generation controls have begun to emerge.

== Little or no censorship or surveillance ==
=== Armenia ===
- Rated "free" by Freedom House in Freedom on the Net in 2013 (score 29), 2014 (score 28), 2015 (score 28), and 2016 (score 30), "partly free" in 2017 (score 32), and "free" in 2018 (score 27).
- Listed as substantial in the political area and as selective in social, conflict/security, and Internet tools by ONI in November 2010.

Access to the Internet in Armenia is largely unfettered, although evidence of second- and third-generation filtering is mounting. Armenia's political climate is volatile and largely unpredictable. In times of political unrest, the government has not hesitated to put in place restrictions on the Internet as a means to curtail public protest and discontent.

=== Cyprus ===
There are no government restrictions on access to the Internet (with the exception that betting sites not licensed by the Republic of Cyprus are blocked) or reports that the government monitored e-mail or Internet chat rooms without appropriate legal authority. Individuals and groups engage in the peaceful expression of views via the Internet, including e‑mail.

The law provides for freedom of speech and press, and the government generally respects these rights in practice. An independent press, an effective judiciary, and a functioning democratic political system combine to ensure freedom of speech and of the press. The law prohibits arbitrary interference with privacy, family, home, or correspondence, and the government generally respects these prohibitions in practice.

=== East Timor ===
There are no government restrictions on access to the Internet or credible reports that the government monitors e-mail or Internet chat rooms. Internet use is very low with less than 1% of the population using the Internet in 2012. Internet access is expensive, slow, unreliable, and not widely available outside of urban areas. The law prohibits arbitrary interference with privacy, family, home, or correspondence and the government generally respects these prohibitions in practice.

=== Iraq ===
- Listed as no evidence in all four areas (political, social, conflict/security, and Internet tools) by ONI in August 2009.

There are no overt government restrictions on access to the Internet or official acknowledgement that the government monitors e-mail or Internet chat rooms without judicial oversight. NGOs report that the government could and was widely believed to monitor e‑mail, chat rooms, and social media sites through local Internet service providers.

The constitution broadly provides for the right of free expression, provided it does not violate public order and morality or express support for the banned Baath Party or for altering the country's borders by violent means. In practice the main limitation on individual and media exercise of these rights is self-censorship due to real fear of reprisals by the government, political parties, ethnic and sectarian forces, terrorist and extremist groups, or criminal gangs. Libel and defamation are offenses under the penal law and the 1968 Publications Law with penalties of up to seven years' imprisonment for publicly insulting the government.

The constitution mandates that authorities may not enter or search homes except with a judicial order. The constitution also prohibits arbitrary interference with privacy. In practice security forces often entered homes without search warrants and took other measures interfering with privacy, family, and correspondence.

=== Israel ===
- Listed as no evidence in all four areas (political, social, conflict/security, and Internet tools) by ONI in August 2009.

The Orthodox Jewish parties in Israel proposed an internet censorship legislation would only allow access to pornographic Internet sites for users who identify themselves as adults and request not to be subject to filtering. In February 2008 the law passed in its first of three votes required, however, it was rejected by the government's legislation committee on 12 July 2009.

=== Japan ===
- Rated "free" in Freedom on the Net by Freedom House in 2013 (score 22), 2014 (score 22), 2015 (score 22), 2016 (score 22), and 2017 (score 23).
- Japan is not individually classified by ONI and does not appear on the RWB lists.

Japanese law provides for freedom of speech and of the press, and the government respects these rights in practice. These freedoms extend to speech and expression on the Internet. An independent press, an effective judiciary and a functioning democratic political system combine to ensure these rights. The government does not restrict or disrupt access to the Internet or censor online content, and there were no credible reports that the government monitors private online communications without appropriate legal authority. The Internet is widely accessible and used. While there is little or no overt censorship or restriction of content, there are concerns that the government indirectly encourages self-censorship practices. A Reporters Without Borders survey concluded that media self-censorship has risen in response to legal changes and government criticism.

Freedom House's Freedom in the World 2017 reports that "Internet access is not restricted" in Japan, while their Freedom on the Net 2017 reports Japan's "Internet freedom status" as "free". ISPs voluntarily filter child pornography, and many offer parents the option to filter other immoral content to protect young internet users. Depictions of genitalia are pixelated to obscure them for Internet users based on Article 175 of the penal code, which governs obscenity.

- The 2001 Provider Liability Limitation Act directed ISPs to establish a self-regulatory framework to govern takedown requests involving illegal or objectionable content, defamation, privacy violations, and copyright infringement. In recent years, content removals have focused on hate speech and obscene content, including child pornography, "revenge porn", explicit images shared without consent of the subject, and increasingly the "right to be forgotten" where search engines are required to unlink inaccurate or irrelevant material about specific individuals.
- Legislation criminalizing the use of the Internet for child pornography and the solicitation of sex from minors was passed in 2003.
- Speech was limited for twelve days before the December 2012 election under a law banning campaigning online. The legislature overturned the law in April 2013, but kept restrictions on campaign e-mail.
- Amendments to the copyright law in 2012 criminalized intentionally downloading content that infringes on copyright. There were calls for civil rather than criminal penalties in such cases. Downloading this content may be punishable by up to 2 years' imprisonment.
- Anti-Korean and anti-Chinese hate speech proliferated online in 2012 and 2013 amid real-world territorial disputes.
- In 2013 new state secrets legislation criminalized both leaking and publishing broadly defined national secrets regardless of intent or content. A July 2014 review by the United Nations Human Rights Committee said the legislation laid out "a vague and broad definition of the matters that can be classified as secret" with "high criminal penalties that could generate a chilling effect on the activities of journalists and human rights defenders."
- A 2014 law dealing with revenge porn requires Internet providers to comply with takedown requests within two days.
- In April 2016 the UN special rapporteur on the right to freedom of opinion and expression said, "The independence of the press is facing serious threats." He noted "weak legal protection, the [new] Specially Designated Secrets Act, and persistent government pressure".

=== Laos ===
Laos is included in the OpenNet Initiative (ONI) Regional Overview for Asia (2009). ONI found no evidence of Internet filtering in the political, social, conflict/security, and tools areas based on testing performed in 2011.

Very few homes have Internet access; most non-business users depend on Internet cafes located chiefly in the larger urban areas. The International Telecommunication Union (ITU) reported that Internet users numbered approximately 11 percent of the country's inhabitants in 2012. The government controls domestic Internet servers and sporadically monitors Internet usage, but by the end of 2012 it apparently did not have the ability to block access to Web sites. Authorities have developed infrastructure to route all Internet traffic through a single gateway, enabling them to monitor and restrict content. However, they apparently had not utilized this increased capability as of the end of 2012. The law generally protects privacy, including that of mail, telephone, and electronic correspondence, but the government reportedly continues to violate these legal protections when there is a perceived security threat. Security laws allow the government to monitor individuals' movements and private communications, including via cell phones and e-mail.
As of September 2022, Internet users in Laos do not face any URL filtering or Internet tapping of any kind. This is valid for all mobile operators and ISPs in the country. See the source for Unitel.

=== Mongolia ===
- Mongolia is not individually classified by ONI or in Freedom House's Freedom on the Net 2013 report, and does not appear on the RWB lists.

There are no government restrictions on access to the Internet. The criminal code and constitution prohibit arbitrary interference with privacy, family, home, or correspondence, however, there are reports of government surveillance, wiretapping, and e-mail account monitoring. Individuals and groups engage in the peaceful expression of views via the Internet, including by e-mail. And while there is no official censorship by the government, journalists frequently complain of harassment and intimidation.

Censorship of public information is banned under the 1998 Media Freedom Law, but a 1995 state secrets law severely limits access to government information. The Law on Information Transparency and Right to Information was passed in June 2011, with the legislation taking effect in December 2011. Internet users remain concerned about a February 2011 regulation, the "General Conditions and Requirements on Digital Content", by the Communications Regulatory Commission (CRC) that restricts obscene and inappropriate content without explicitly defining it and requires popular websites to make their users' IP addresses publicly visible.

=== Nepal ===
- Listed as no evidence in all four areas (political, social, conflict/security, and Internet tools) by ONI in May 2007.

In 2007 Nepali journalists reported virtually unconditional freedom of the press, including the Internet, and ONI's testing revealed no evidence that Nepal imposes technological filters on the Internet.

=== Taiwan ===
- Taiwan is not individually classified by ONI or in Freedom House's Freedom on the Net 2013 report, and does not appear on the RWB lists.

Taiwan's constitution provides for freedom of speech and press, and the authorities generally respect these rights in practice. An independent press, an effective judiciary, and a functioning democratic political system combine to protect freedom of speech and press. There are no official restrictions on access to the Internet or credible reports that the authorities monitor e-mail or Internet chat rooms without judicial oversight. The extent to which child prostitution occurs is difficult to measure because of increased use of the Internet and other sophisticated communication technologies to solicit clients.

== See also ==
- Internet censorship and surveillance in Africa
- Internet censorship and surveillance in Europe
- Internet censorship and surveillance in Oceania
- Internet censorship and surveillance in the Americas
- Global Internet Freedom Task Force – an initiative of the U.S. Department of State
- International Freedom of Expression Exchange – monitors Internet censorship worldwide
- Reporters sans frontières (Reporters Without Borders)
- The Web Index by the World Wide Web Foundation, a measure of the World Wide Web's contribution to social, economic and political progress in countries across the world.
