= Internet censorship and surveillance in Africa =

Internet censorship and surveillance by country (2018): Pervasive Substantial / Selective Little or none; Unclassified / No data

This list of Internet censorship and surveillance in Africa provides information on the types and levels of Internet censorship and surveillance that is occurring in countries in Africa.

Detailed country by country information on Internet censorship and surveillance is provided in the Freedom on the Net reports from Freedom House, by the OpenNet Initiative, by Reporters Without Borders, and in the Country Reports on Human Rights Practices from the U.S. State Department Bureau of Democracy, Human Rights, and Labor. The ratings produced by several of these organizations are summarized below as well as in the Censorship by country article.

== Classifications ==
The level of Internet censorship and surveillance in a country is classified in one of the four categories: pervasive, substantial, selective, and little or no censorship or surveillance. The classifications are based on the classifications and ratings from the Freedom on the Net reports by Freedom House supplemented with information from the OpenNet Initiative (ONI), Reporters Without Borders (RWB), and the Country Reports on Human Rights Practices by the U.S. State Department Bureau of Democracy, Human Rights, and Labor.

Pervasive censorship or surveillance: A country is classified as engaged in pervasive censorship or surveillance when it often censors political, social, and other content, is engaged in mass surveillance of the Internet, and retaliates against citizens who circumvent censorship or surveillance with imprisonment or other sanctions. A country is included in the "pervasive" category when it:

- is rated as "not free" with a total score of 71 to 100 in the Freedom on the Net (FOTN) report from Freedom House,
- is rated "not free" in FOTN or is not rated in FOTN and
  - is included on the "Internet enemies" list from Reporters Without Borders, or
  - when the OpenNet Initiative categorizes the level of Internet filtering as pervasive in any of the four areas (political, social, conflict/security, and Internet tools) for which they test.

Substantial censorship or surveillance: Countries included in this classification are engaged in substantial Internet censorship and surveillance. This includes countries where a number of categories are subject to a medium level of filtering or many categories are subject to a low level of filtering. A country is included in the "substantial" category when it:

- is not included in the "pervasive" category, and
  - is rated as "not free" in the Freedom on the Net (FOTN) report from Freedom House, or
  - is rated "partly free" or is not rated in FOTN, and
    - is included on the "Internet enemies" list from Reporters Without Borders, or
    - when the OpenNet Initiative categorizes the level of Internet filtering as pervasive or substantial in any of the four areas (political, social, conflict/security, and Internet tools) for which they test.

Selective censorship or surveillance: Countries included in this classification were found to practice selective Internet censorship and surveillance. This includes countries where a small number of specific sites are blocked or censorship targets a small number of categories or issues. A country is included in the "selective" category when it:

- is not included in the "pervasive" or "substantial" categories, and
  - is rated as "partly free" in the Freedom on the Net (FOTN) report from Freedom House, or
  - is included on the "Internet enemies" list from Reporters Without Borders, or
  - is not rated in FOTN and the OpenNet Initiative categorizes the level of Internet filtering as selective in any of the four areas (political, social, conflict/security, and Internet tools) for which they test.

Little or no censorship or surveillance: A country is included in the "little or no censorship or surveillance" category when it is not included in the "pervasive", "substantial" or "selective" categories.

This classification includes countries that are listed as "free" on the Freedom on the Net list from Freedom House, are not listed as "Enemies of the Internet" by Reporters Without Borders (RWB), and for which no evidence of Internet filtering was found by the OpenNet Initiative (ONI) in any of the four areas (political, social, conflict/security, and Internet tools) for which they test. Other controls such as voluntary filtering, self-censorship, and other types of public or private action to limit child pornography, hate speech, defamation, or theft of intellectual property often exist. The various nation sections, below, include ratings by ONI, RWB, etc.

== Pervasive censorship or surveillance ==
=== Egypt ===
- Rated "partly free" in Freedom on the Net by Freedom House in 2009 (score 51), 2011 (score 54), 2012 (score 59), 2013 (score 60), and 2014 (score 60); and "not free" in 2015 (score 61), 2016 (score 63), 2017 (score 68), and 2018 (score 72).
- In August 2009 ONI found no evidence of Internet filtering in any of the four areas (political, social, conflict/security, and Internet tools).
- Listed as an Internet Enemy by RWB from 2006 to 2010.
- Listed as Under Surveillance by RWB from 2011 to the present.

The Internet in Egypt was not directly censored under President Hosni Mubarak, but his regime kept watch on the most critical bloggers and regularly arrested them. At the height of the uprising against the dictatorship, in late January 2011, the authorities first filtered pictures of the repression and then cut off Internet access entirely in a bid to stop the revolt spreading. The success of the 2011 Egyptian revolution offers a chance to establish greater freedom of expression in Egypt, especially online. In response to these dramatic events and opportunities, in March 2011, Reporters Without Borders moved Egypt from its "Internet enemies" list to its list of countries "under surveillance".

In March 2012 Reporters Without Borders reported:

The first anniversary of Egypt's revolution was celebrated in a climate of uncertainty and tension between a contested military power, a protest movement attempting to get its second wind, and triumphant Islamists. Bloggers and netizens critical of the army have been harassed, threatened, and sometimes arrested.

The Supreme Council of the Armed Forces (SCAF), which has been leading the country since February 2011, has not only perpetuated Hosni Mubarak's ways of controlling information, but has strengthened them.

=== Ethiopia ===
- Rated "not free" in Freedom on the Net by Freedom House in 2011 (score 69), 2012 (score 75), 2013 (score 79), 2014 (score 80), 2015 (score 82), 2016 (score 83), 2017 (score 86), and 2018 (score 83).
- Listed as pervasive in the political, as no evidence in social, and selective in the conflict/security and Internet tools areas by ONI in October 2012.

Ethiopia remains a highly restrictive environment in which to express political dissent online. The government of Ethiopia has long filtered critical and oppositional political content. Anti-terrorism legislation is frequently used to target online speech, including in the recent conviction of a dozen individuals, many of whom were tried based on their online writings. OpenNet Initiative (ONI) testing conducted in Ethiopia in September 2012 found that online political and news content continues to be blocked, including the blogs and websites of a number of recently convicted individuals.

Ethiopia has implemented a largely political filtering regime that blocks access to popular blogs and the Web sites of many news organizations, dissident political parties, and human rights groups. However, much of the media content that the government is attempting to censor can be found on sites that are not banned. The authors of the blocked blogs have in many cases continued to write for an international audience, apparently without sanction. However, Ethiopia is increasingly jailing journalists, and the government has shown a growing propensity toward repressive behavior both off- and online. Censorship is likely to become more extensive as Internet access expands across the country.

== Substantial censorship or surveillance ==
=== Sudan ===
- Rated "not free" by Freedom House in Freedom on the Net in 2013 (score 63), 2014 (score 65), 2015 (score 65), 2016 (score 64), 2017 (score 64), and 2018 (score 65).
- Listed as substantial in the social and Internet tools areas and as selective in political, and as no evidence in conflict/security by ONI in August 2009.
- Listed as an Internet Enemy by RWB in 2014.

Sudan openly acknowledges filtering content that transgresses public morality and ethics or threatens order. The state's regulatory authority has established a special unit to monitor and implement filtration; this primarily targets pornography and, to a lesser extent, gay and lesbian content, dating sites, provocative attire, and many anonymizer and proxy Web sites.

== Selective censorship or surveillance ==
=== Angola ===
- Rated "partly free" by Freedom House in Freedom on the Net in 2013 (score 34), 2014 (score 38), and 2015 (score 39).
- Angola is not individually classified by ONI and does not appear on the RWB lists.

There are no government restrictions on access to the Internet or credible reports that the government monitors e-mail or chat rooms without judicial oversight. And aside from child pornography and copyrighted material, the government does not block or filter Internet content and there are no restrictions on the type of information that can be exchanged. Social media and communications apps such as YouTube, Facebook, Twitter, and international blog-hosting services are all freely available.

Censorship of traditional news and information sources is common, leading to worries that similar efforts to control online information will eventually emerge. Defamation, libel, and insulting the country or president in "public meetings or by disseminating words, images, writings, or sound" are crimes punishable by imprisonment. A proposed "Law to Combat Crime in the Area of Information Technologies and Communication" was introduced by the National Assembly in March 2011. Often referred to as the cybercrime bill, the law was ultimately withdrawn in May 2011 as a result of international pressure and vocal objections from civil society. However, the government publicly stated that similar clauses regarding cybercrimes will be incorporated into an ongoing revision of the penal code, leaving open the possibility of Internet-specific restrictions becoming law in the future.

An April 2013 news report claimed that state security services were planning to implement electronic monitoring that could track email and other digital communications. In March 2014, corroborating information from military sources was found, affirming that a German company had assisted the Angolan military intelligence in installing a monitoring system at the BATOPE base around September 2013. There was also evidence of a major ISP hosting a spyware system.

=== Eritrea ===
- Listed as Under Surveillance by RWB in 2008, 2009, and again from 2011 to the present.

Eritrea has not set up a widespread automatic Internet filtering system, but it does not hesitate to order blocking of several diaspora websites critical of the regime. Access to these sites is blocked by two of the Internet service providers, Erson and Ewan, as are pornographic websites and YouTube. Self-censorship is said to be widespread.

=== Gambia ===
- Rated "not free" by Freedom House in Freedom on the Net in 2014 (score 65), 2015 (score 65), 2016 (score 67), 2017 (score 67), and "partly free" in 2018 (score 55).
- Not individually classified by ONI, but classified as selective based on the limited descriptions in the ONI profile for the sub-Saharan Africa region.

There are no government restrictions on access to the Internet or reports that the government monitors e-mail or Internet chat rooms without appropriate legal authority. Individuals and groups can generally engage in the peaceful expression of views via the Internet, including by e-mail. However, Internet users reported they could not access the Web sites of foreign online newspapers Freedom, The Gambia Echo, Hellogambia, and Jollofnews, which criticized the government.

The constitution and law provide for freedom of speech and press; however, the government restricted these rights. According to the Observatory for the Protection of Human Rights Defenders, "the environment for independent and opposition media remained hostile, with numerous obstacles to freedom of expression, including administrative hurdles, arbitrary arrest and detention, intimidation and judicial harassment against journalists, and the closure of media outlets, leading to self-censorship." Individuals who publicly or privately criticized the government or the president risked government reprisal. In March 2011 President Jammeh warned independent journalists that he would "not compromise or sacrifice the peace, security, stability, dignity, and the well-being of Gambians for the sake of freedom of expression." Accusing some journalists of being the "mouthpiece of opposition parties", he vowed to prosecute any journalist who offended him. The National Intelligence Agency (NIA) was involved in arbitrary closure of media outlets and the extrajudicial detention of journalists.

In 2007 a Gambian journalist living in the US was convicted of sedition for an article published online; she was fined US$12,000; in 2006 the Gambian police ordered all subscribers to an online independent newspaper to report to the police or face arrest.

The constitution and law prohibit arbitrary interference with privacy, family, home, or correspondence, but the government does not respect these prohibitions. Observers believe the government monitors citizens engaged in activities that it deems objectionable.

=== Kenya ===
- Rated as "partly free" in Freedom on the Net reports by Freedom House in the 2009 (score 34) and 2011 (score 32), as "free" in 2012 (score 29), 2013 (score 28), 2014 (score 28), 2015 (score 29), 2016 (score 29), and 2017 (score 29), and "partly free" in 2018 (score 32).
- There is no ONI country profile for Kenya.

The government does not employ technical filtering or any administrative censorship system to restrict access to political or other content. There are no government restrictions on access to the Internet, but Internet services are limited in rural areas due to lack of infrastructure. In 2008, approximately 8.6 percent of Kenyans used the Internet.

The constitution protects freedom of expression and the "freedom to communicate ideas and information." However, it also grants the government the authority to punish defamation, protect privileged information, and restrict state employees' "freedom of expression in the interest of defense, public safety, public order, public morality or public health." In January 2009, the government passed a controversial Communications Amendment Act that established that any person who publishes, transmits, or causes to be published in electronic form obscene information commits an offense. The Act also outlines other forms of illegality associated with the use of information and communication technologies.

In July 2009 the government announced that all cell phone users had to provide the government with their name and identification number. This regulation applies to citizens who access the Internet through cell phone-based services as well.

=== Libya ===
- Rated "partly free" in Freedom on the Net by Freedom House in 2012 (score 43), 2013 (score 45), 2014 (score 48), and 2015 (score 54).
- Listed as selective in the political area and as no evidence in social, conflict/security, and Internet tools by ONI in August 2009.
- Identified by Freedom House as one of seven countries seen as particularly vulnerable to deterioration in their online freedoms during 2012 and 2013.

The overthrow of the Gaddafi regime in August 2011 ended an era of censorship. The Constitutional Declaration under the interim governments provides for freedom of opinion, expression, and the press. There are no government restrictions on access to the Internet, but there are credible reports that the government monitors e-mail or Internet communication. Social media applications, such as YouTube, Facebook, and Twitter, were freely accessible. Internet content is not filtered, but service is often unreliable or nonexistent outside major cities.

Before his removal and death, Col. Gaddafi had tried to impose a news blackout by cutting access to the Internet. Prior to this, Internet filtering under the Gaddafi regime had become more selective, focusing on a few political opposition Web sites. This relatively lenient filtering policy coincided with what was arguably a trend toward greater openness and increasing freedom of the press. However, the legal and political climate continued to encourage self-censorship in online media.

In 2006 Reporters Without Borders removed Libya from their list of Internet enemies after a fact-finding visit found no evidence of Internet censorship. ONI's 2007–2008 technical test results contradicted that conclusion, however. And in 2012 RWB removed Libya from its list of countries under surveillance.

=== Malawi ===
- Rated "partly free" in the Freedom on the Net report from Freedom House in 2013 (score 42), 2014 (score 42), and 2015 (score 40).
- Not individually classified by ONI, but is included in the regional overview for sub-Saharan Africa.

Malawi prohibits the publication or transmission of anything "that could be useful to the enemy", as well as religiously offensive and obscene material. Malawi participates in regional efforts to combat cybercrime: the East African Community (consisting of Kenya, Tanzania, and Uganda) and the South African Development Community (consisting of Malawi, Mozambique, South Africa, Zambia, and Zimbabwe) have both enacted plans to standardize cybercrime laws throughout their regions.

=== Mali ===
There are no government restrictions on access to the Internet except for pornography or material deemed objectionable to Islamic values. There were no credible reports that the government monitored e-mail or Internet chat rooms without judicial oversight. Individuals and groups engage in the expression of views via the Internet, including by e‑mail.

The Ministry of Islamic Affairs continues to block Web sites considered anti-Islamic or pornographic. In November 2011 the Telecommunications Authority blocked and banned a local blog, Hilath.com, at the request of the Islamic Ministry because of its anti-Islamic content. The blog was known for promoting religious tolerance, as well as for discussing the blogger's homosexuality. NGO sources stated that in general the media practiced self-censorship on issues related to Islam due to fears of being labeled "anti-Islamic" and subsequently harassed. This self-censorship also applied to reporting on problems in and criticisms of the judiciary.

=== Mauritania ===
- Classified by ONI as selective in the political and as no evidence in the social, security/conflict, and Internet tools areas in 2009. There is no individual ONI country profile for Mauritania, but it is included in the ONI regional overview for the Middle East and North Africa.

There were no government restrictions on access to the Internet or reports that the government monitored email or Internet chat rooms in 2010. Individuals and groups could engage in the peaceful expression of views via the Internet, including by e-mail. There is a law prohibiting child pornography with penalties of two months to one year imprisonment and a 160,000 to 300,000 ouguiya ($550 to $1,034) fine.

Between 16 March and 19 March 2009 and again on 25 June 2009 the news Web site Taqadoumy was blocked. On 26 February 2010, Hanevy Ould Dehah, director of Taqadoumy, received a presidential pardon after being detained since December 2009 despite having served his sentence for crimes against Islam and paying all imposed fines and legal fees. Dehah, who was originally arrested in June 2009 on charges of defamation of presidential candidate Ibrahima Sarr for publishing an article stating that Sarr bought a house with campaign money from General Aziz. Dehah, was sentenced in August 2009 to six months in prison and fined 30,000 ouguiya ($111) for committing acts contrary to Islam and decency. The sentencing judge accused Dehah of creating a space allowing individuals to express anti-Islamic and indecent views, based on a female reader's comments made on the Taqadoumy site calling for increased sexual freedom.

=== Morocco ===
- Rated "partly free" by Freedom House in Freedom on the Net in 2013 (score 42), 2014 (score 44), and 2015 (score 43).
- Listed as selective in the social, conflict/security, and Internet tools areas and as no evidence in political by ONI in August 2009.

Internet access in Morocco is, for the most part, open and unrestricted. Morocco's Internet filtration regime is relatively light and focuses on a few blog sites, a few highly visible anonymizers, and for a brief period in May 2007, the video sharing Web site YouTube. ONI testing revealed that Morocco no longer filters a majority of sites in favor of independence of the Western Sahara, which were previously blocked. The filtration regime is not comprehensive, that is to say, similar content can be found on other Web sites that are not blocked. On the other hand, Morocco has started to prosecute Internet users and bloggers for their online activities and writings.

=== Nigeria ===
- Rated "partly free" by Freedom House in Freedom on the Net in 2011 (score 35), 2012 (score 33), 2013 (score 31), 2014 (score 33), and 2015 (score 33).
- Listed as no evidence in all four areas (political, social, conflict/security, and Internet tools) by ONI in October 2009.

There are few government restrictions on access to the Internet or credible reports the government monitors e-mail or Internet chat rooms. Although the constitution and law provide for freedom of speech, including for members of the press, the government sometimes restricts these rights in practice. Libel is a civil offense and requires defendants to prove the truth of opinion or value judgment contained in news reports or commentaries. Militant groups such as Boko Haram threaten, attack, and kill journalists in connection with their reporting of the sect's activities.

On 24 October 2012 police in Bauchi State arraigned civil servant Abbas Ahmed Faggo before a court for allegedly defaming the character of Governor Isa Yuguda after he posted messages on his Facebook account accusing the governor of spending public funds on his son's wedding. On 4 November, the court discharged Faggo, but media reported the state government fired him later that month.

During 2012 several Internet news sites critical of the government experienced server problems, which site owners attributed to government interference. Such disruptions usually lasted a few hours.

=== Rwanda ===
- Rated "partly free" by Freedom House in Freedom on the Net in 2011 (score 50), 2012 (score 51), 2013 (score 48), 2014 (score 50), and 2015 (score 50).
- Not individually classified by ONI.
- Identified in Freedom on the Net 2012 as one of seven countries that were at particular risk of suffering setbacks related to Internet freedom in late 2012 and in 2013. The Internet in these countries was described at the time as being a relatively open and unconstrained space for free expression, but the countries also typically featured a repressive environment for traditional media and had recently considered or introduced legislation that would negatively affect Internet freedom.

The law does not provide for government restrictions on access to the Internet, but there are reports that the government blocks access to Web sites within the country that are critical of the government. In 2012 and 2013, some independent online news outlets and opposition blogs were intermittently inaccessible. Some opposition sites continue to be blocked on some ISPs in early 2013, including Umusingi and Inyenyeri News, which were first blocked in 2011.

The constitution provides for freedom of speech and press "in conditions prescribed by the law." The government at times restricts these rights. Laws prohibit promoting divisionism, genocide ideology, and genocide denial, "spreading rumors aimed at inciting the population to rise against the regime", expressing contempt for the Head of State, other high-level public officials, administrative authorities or other public servants, and slander of foreign and international officials and dignitaries. These acts or expression of these viewpoints sometimes results in arrest, harassment, or intimidation. Numerous journalists practice self-censorship.

The constitution and law prohibit arbitrary interference with privacy, family, home, or correspondence; however, there are numerous reports the government monitors homes, telephone calls, e-mail, Internet chat rooms, other private communications, movements, and personal and institutional data. In some cases monitoring has led to detention and interrogation by State security forces (SSF).

=== Tunisia ===
- Rated "not free" by Freedom House in Freedom on the Net in 2009 (score 76) and 2011 (score 81) and as "partly free" in 2012 (score 46), 2013 (score 41), 2014 (score 39), and 2015 (score 38).
- Listed as no evidence in the political, social, conflict/security, and Internet tools areas by ONI in 2012.
- Listed as Under Surveillance by RWB from 2011 to the present.

Internet censorship in Tunisia significantly decreased in January 2011, following the ouster of President Zine El Abidine Ben Ali, as the new acting government:

- proclaimed complete freedom of information and expression as a fundamental principle,
- abolished the information ministry, and
- removed filters on social networking sites such as Facebook and YouTube.

Some Internet censorship reemerged when in May 2011:

- the Permanent Military Tribunal of Tunis ordered four Facebook pages blocked for attempting "to damage the reputation of the military institution and, its leaders, by the publishing of video clips and, the circulation of comments and, articles that aim to destabilize the trust of citizens in the national army, and spread disorder and chaos in the country", and
- a court ordered the Tunisian Internet Agency (ATI) to block porn sites on the grounds that they posed a threat to minors and Muslim values.

Prior to January 2011 the Ben Ali regime had blocked thousands of websites (such as pornography, mail, search engine cached pages, online documents conversion and translation services) and peer-to-peer and FTP transfer using a transparent proxy and port blocking. Cyber dissidents including pro-democracy lawyer Mohammed Abbou were jailed by the Tunisian government for their online activities.

=== Uganda ===
- Rated "partly free" in Freedom on the Net by Freedom House in 2012 (score 34), 2013 (score 34), 2014 (score 34), and 2015 (score 36).
- Listed as no evidence in all four areas (political, social, conflict/security, and Internet tools) by ONI in September 2009.

Though Uganda has made great technological strides in the past five years, the country still faces a number of challenges in obtaining affordable, reliable Internet bandwidth. This, rather than a formal government-sponsored filtering regime, is the major obstacle to Internet access. Just prior to the presidential elections in February 2006, the Uganda Communications Commission (UCC) blocked the anti-government Web site RadioKatwe in the only internationally reported case of Internet filtering in Uganda to date.

=== Western Sahara ===
Morocco claims the Western Sahara territory and administers Moroccan law through Moroccan institutions in the estimated 85 percent of the territory it controls. The Popular Front for the Liberation of Saguia el Hamra and Rio de Oro (Polisario), an organization that has sought independence for the former Spanish territory since 1973, disputes Morocco's claim to sovereignty over the territory.

There is no indication that Internet access in the territory differs from that in internationally recognized Morocco.

Morocco considers the part of the territory that it administers to be an integral component of the kingdom with the same laws and structures regarding civil liberties, political and economic rights. Moroccan law prohibits citizens from criticizing Islam or the institution of the monarchy or to oppose the government's official position regarding territorial integrity and Western Sahara. Saharan media outlets and bloggers practice self-censorship on these issues, and there are no reports of government action against them for what they write. Human rights and Sahrawi bloggers affiliated with leftist political groups assume that authorities closely monitor their activities and feel the need to hide their identities.

=== Zambia ===
- Rated "partly free" by Freedom House in Freedom on the Net in 2014 (score 43) and 2015 (score 40).

Internet access is not restricted and individuals and groups freely express their views via the Internet, however the government frequently threatens to deregister critical online publications and blogs.

The constitution and law provide for freedom of speech and press, however the government uses provisions contained in the law to restrict these freedoms. The government is sensitive to opposition and other criticism and has been quick to prosecute critics using the legal pretext that they had incited public disorder. Libel laws are used to suppress free speech and the press. The constitution and law prohibit arbitrary interference with privacy, family, home, or correspondence, but the government frequently does not respect these prohibitions.

=== Zimbabwe ===
- Rated "partly free" by Freedom House in Freedom on the Net in 2011 (score 54), 2012 (score 54), 2013 (score 54), 2014 (score 55), and 2015 (score 56).
- Listed as no evidence in all four areas (political, social, conflict/security, and Internet tools) by ONI in September 2009.

Because Internet penetration in Zimbabwe is low, it is mainly used for e-mail and the government focuses its efforts to control the Internet to e-mail monitoring and censorship. Though its legal authority to pursue such measures is contested, the government appears to be following through on its wishes to crack down on dissent via e-mail.

== Little or no censorship or surveillance ==
=== Algeria ===
- Listed as no evidence in all four areas (political, social, conflict/security, and Internet tools) by ONI in August 2009.

Internet access in Algeria is not restricted by technical filtering. However, the state controls the Internet infrastructure and regulates content by other means. Internet users and Internet service providers (ISPs) can face criminal penalties for posting or allowing the posting of material deemed contrary to public order or morality.

=== Botswana ===
There are no government restrictions on access to the Internet or credible reports the government monitors e-mail or Internet chat rooms. The constitution and law provide for freedom of speech and press and the government generally respects these rights. The constitution and law prohibit arbitrary interference with privacy, family, home, or correspondence, and the government generally respects these prohibitions in practice.

=== Burkina Faso ===
There are no government restrictions on access to the Internet; however, the Superior Council of Communication (SCC) monitors Internet Web sites and discussion forums to ensure compliance with existing regulations.

The constitution and law provide for freedom of speech and of the press, and the government generally respects these rights in practice. The law prohibits persons from insulting the head of state or using derogatory language with respect to the office; however, individuals criticize the government publicly or privately without reprisal.

The constitution and law prohibit arbitrary interference with privacy, family, home, or correspondence, and the government generally respects these prohibitions in practice. In cases of national security, however, the law permits surveillance, searches, and monitoring of telephones and private correspondence without a warrant.

=== Burundi ===
There are no government restrictions on access to the Internet or credible reports that the government monitors e-mail or Internet chat rooms. In 2012 the Internet was used by just 1.2% of the population, which limits the effect of the Internet on the economy and politics of Burundi.

The constitution and law provide for freedom of speech and press, and the government generally respects these rights. The law prohibits the media from spreading "hate" messages or from using abusive or defamatory language against public servants acting in their official role that could damage the dignity of or respect for the public office. Libel laws prohibit the public distribution of information that exposes a person to "public contempt" and carry penalties of prison terms and fines. It is illegal for anyone to display materials that may disturb the public peace. Some journalists, lawyers, and political party, civil society, and NGO leaders allege the government uses these laws to intimidate and harass them.

The constitution and law provide for the right to privacy, but the government does not always respect this right in practice. Authorities do not always respect the law requiring search warrants.

=== Cameroon ===
There are no government restrictions on access to the Internet or reports that the government monitors e-mail or Internet chat rooms.

Although the law provides for freedom of speech and press, it also criminalizes media offenses, and the government restricts freedoms of speech and press. Government officials threaten, harass, arrest, and deny equal treatment to individuals or organizations that criticize government policies or express views at odds with government policy. Individuals who criticize the government publicly or privately sometimes face reprisals. Press freedom is constrained by strict libel laws that suppress criticism. These laws authorize the government, at its discretion and the request of the plaintiff, to criminalize a civil libel suit or to initiate a criminal libel suit in cases of alleged libel against the president and other high government officials. Such crimes are punishable by prison terms and heavy fines.

Although the constitution and law prohibit arbitrary interference with privacy, family, home, or correspondence, these rights are subject to restriction for the "higher interests of the state", and there are credible reports that police and gendarmes harass citizens, conduct searches without warrants, and open or seize mail with impunity.

=== Central African Republic ===
There are no government restrictions on access to the Internet or credible reports that the government monitors e-mail or Internet chat rooms without judicial oversight. Internet use in the Central African Republic is low, reaching just 3.0% of the population in 2012, and so plays only a small role in the economic and political life of the country.

Although the constitution and law provide for freedom of speech and press, authorities occasionally arrest journalists critical of the government and in some cases the government impedes individuals' right to free speech. Imprisonment for defamation and censorship were abolished in 2005; however, journalists found guilty of libel or slander face fines of 100,000 to eight million CFA francs ($200 to US$16,000). The law provides for imprisonment and fines of as much as one million CFA francs (US$2,000) for journalists who use the media to incite disobedience among security forces or incite persons to violence, hatred, or discrimination. Similar fines and imprisonment of six months to two years may be imposed for the publication or broadcast of false or fabricated information that "would disturb the peace."

=== Chad ===
There are no government restrictions on access to the Internet or credible reports that the government monitors e-mail or Internet chat rooms. Although individuals and groups can engage in the peaceful expression of views via the Internet, few residents have access to it.

The constitution provides for freedom of opinion, expression, and press, but the government does not always respect these rights. Private individuals are generally free to criticize the government without reprisal, but reporters and publishers risk harassment from authorities when publishing critical articles. The 2010 media law abolished prison sentences for defamation and insult, but prohibits "inciting racial, ethnic, or religious hatred", which is punishable by one to two years in prison and a fine of one to three million CFA francs ($2,000 to $6,000).

=== Congo, Democratic Republic of the ===
The government does not restrict access to the Internet or monitor e-mail or Internet chat rooms. The Conseil Superieur de l'Audiovisuel et de la Communication (CSAC, Superior Council of Broadcasting and Communication) law stipulates that bloggers must obtain authorization from CSAC. Through the end of 2012 CSAC had not refused authorization to any bloggers. Private entrepreneurs make Internet access available at moderate prices through Internet cafes in large cities throughout the country. According to the International Telecommunication Union (ITU), just 1.2% of individuals used the Internet in 2011. By the end of 2012 Internet use had risen to 1.7% of the population. This low use limits the effect that the Internet has on the economic and political life of the country.

=== Congo, Republic of the ===
There are no government restrictions on access to the Internet, or reports the government monitors e-mail or Internet chat rooms. The relatively low use of the Internet (6.1% of the population in 2012) limits the effect it has on the economy or politics. However, a growing proportion of the public, especially youth, are accessing the Internet more frequently and utilizing online social media.

The constitution and law provide for freedom of speech and press, and the government generally respects these rights. The law makes certain types of speech illegal, including incitement of ethnic hatred, violence, or civil war.

The constitution and law prohibit arbitrary interference with privacy, family, home, or correspondence, and the government generally respects these prohibitions. The government makes no known attempts to collect personally identifiable information via the Internet.

=== Equatorial Guinea ===
There are no government restrictions on access to the Internet or credible reports the government monitors e-mail or Internet chat rooms without judicial oversight.

Although the constitution and law provide for freedom of speech and press, the law grants authorities extensive powers to restrict media activities, which the government uses to limit these rights. While criticism of government policies is allowed, individuals generally cannot criticize the president, his family, other high-ranking officials, or the security forces without fear of reprisal.

The constitution and law prohibit arbitrary interference with privacy, family, home, or correspondence, but the government often does not respect these prohibitions. The government reportedly attempts to impede criticism by monitoring the activities of the political opposition, journalists, and others.

=== Gabon ===
There are no government restrictions on access to the Internet or credible reports the government monitors e-mail or Internet chat rooms without appropriate legal authority.

The constitution and law provide for freedom of speech and press, and the government generally respects these rights. Libel can be either a criminal offense or a civil matter. Penalties include two to six months in prison and fines of from 500,000 to five million CFA francs ($1,008 to $10,080). Penalties for libel, disrupting public order, and other offenses also include a one- to three-month publishing suspension for a first offense and a three- to six-month suspension for repeat offenses.

Although the constitution and law prohibit arbitrary interference with privacy, family, home, or correspondence, the government does not always respect these prohibitions in practice. Authorities reportedly monitor private telephone conversations, personal mail, and the movement of citizens.

=== Ghana ===
- Not individually classified by ONI, but is included in the regional overview for sub-Saharan Africa.

There are no government restrictions on access to the Internet or reports that the government monitors e-mail or Internet chat rooms without judicial oversight. Individuals and groups engage in the peaceful expression of views via the Internet, including by e-mail.

Although the constitution and law provide for freedom of speech and press, the government sometimes restricts those rights. The police arbitrarily arrest and detain journalists. Some journalists practice self-censorship. The constitution prohibits arbitrary interference with privacy, family, home, or correspondence, and the government respects these prohibitions in practice.

=== Guinea ===
There are no government restrictions on access to the Internet or credible reports that the government monitors e-mail or Internet chat rooms without judicial oversight. Internet usage is very low, reaching just 1.5% of the population in 2012 and as a result the Internet plays only a very small role in the political or economic life of the country.

The constitution and law provide for freedom of speech and of the press, but the government, nevertheless, restricts these freedoms. Libel against the head of state, slander, and false reporting are subject to heavy fines. Although the constitution and law provide for the inviolability of the home and legal searches require judicial search warrants, police reportedly ignore legal procedures in the pursuit of criminal suspects or when it serves their personal interests.

=== Guinea-Bissau ===
There are no government restrictions on access to the Internet or reports that the government monitors e-mail or Internet chat rooms without judicial oversight. Internet usage is very low, reaching just 2.9% of the population in 2012 and as a result the Internet plays only a small role in the political or economic life of the country.

The constitution and law provide for freedom of speech and press; however, there are reports that the government does not always respect these rights. The constitution and law prohibit arbitrary interference with privacy, family, home, or correspondence, but the government does not always respect these prohibitions in practice. Police routinely ignore privacy rights and protections against unreasonable search and seizure.

=== Ivory Coast ===
There are no government restrictions on access to the Internet or reports that the government monitors e-mail or Internet chat rooms without appropriate legal authority. Authorities permit suspended newspapers to publish their full content online. Internet use in the country is low and the Internet does not yet play a large role in the political or economic life of the country.

The constitution and law provide for freedom of speech and press; however, there are limited restrictions on press freedom. The law prohibits incitement to violence, ethnic hatred, rebellion, and insulting the head of state or other senior members of the government. Criminal libel is punishable by one to three years in prison. Libel deemed to threaten the national interest is punishable by six months to five years in prison.

The constitution and law provide rights protecting against arbitrary interference with privacy, family, home, or correspondence, but the government does not always respect these rights in practice.

=== Lesotho ===
There are no government restrictions on access to the Internet or credible reports that the government monitors e-mail or Internet chat rooms without judicial oversight. The Internet is not widely available and almost nonexistent in rural areas due to the lack of communications infrastructure and high cost of access.

The constitution and law provide for freedom of speech, so long as they do not interfere with "defense, public safety, public order, public morality, or public health". The government generally respects this right. The law prohibits expressions of hatred or contempt for any person because of the person's race, ethnic affiliation, gender, disability, or color.

=== Liberia ===
There are no government restrictions on access to the Internet or reports that the government monitors e-mail or Internet chat rooms.

The constitution provides for freedom of speech and press, and the government generally respects these rights in practice. Libel and national security laws place some limits on freedom of speech. The constitution prohibits arbitrary interference with privacy, family, home, or correspondence, and the government generally respects these prohibitions in practice.

=== Madagascar ===
There are generally no restrictions on access to the Internet, or reports that the de facto government monitors e-mail or Internet chat rooms. However, the de facto minister of communication made several statements throughout 2012 about restricting the Internet.

Political groups, parties, and activists use the Internet extensively to advance their agendas, share news, and criticize other parties. Although there have been allegations of technical sabotage of some Web sites, the Internet is considered among the more reliable sources of information, as many Internet servers were outside the country and cannot be regulated by the regime. The constitution and law provide for freedom of speech and press, but the de facto regime and military actors actively and systematically impeded the exercise of freedoms of expression and of the press. The law prohibits arbitrary Interference with privacy, family, home, or correspondence, but homes and workplaces of opposition groups are subject to arbitrary searches without warrants.

=== Mozambique ===
There are no government restrictions on access to the Internet, however, opposition party members report government intelligence agents monitor e-mail.

The constitution and law provide for freedom of speech and the press, and the government generally respects these rights in practice. Individuals can generally criticize the government publicly or privately without reprisal. Some individuals express a fear that the government monitors their private telephone and e-mail communications. Many journalists practice self-censorship.

=== Namibia ===
There are no government restrictions on access to the Internet; however, the Communications Act provides that the intelligence services can monitor e-mail and Internet usage with authorization from any magistrate. There have been some allegations and rumors that the government reviewed ways to block or curtail social media sites, but there is no concrete evidence of such action.

The constitution provides for freedom of speech and of the press, and the government generally respects these rights.

=== Niger ===
There are no government restrictions on access to the Internet or reports that the government monitors e-mail or Internet chat rooms. Although individuals and groups can engage in the peaceful expression of views via the Internet, few residents have access to it.

The constitution and law provide for freedom of speech and press, and the government generally respects these rights in practice. The constitution and law generally prohibit arbitrary interference with privacy, family, home, or correspondence, and the government generally respects these prohibitions.

=== Senegal ===
There are no government restrictions on access to the Internet, or reports that the government monitors e-mail or Internet chat rooms without appropriate legal authority. Individuals and groups engage in the peaceful expression of views via the Internet, including by e‑mail.

The constitution and law provide for freedom of speech and press; however, the government limits these rights in practice. Individuals can generally criticize the government publicly or privately without reprisal. The law criminalizes libel, and libel laws are used to block or punish critical reporting and commentary. The constitution and law prohibit arbitrary interference with privacy, family, home, or correspondence, and the government generally respects these prohibitions in practice.

=== Sierra Leone ===
There are no government restrictions on access to the Internet or credible reports that the government monitors e-mail or Internet chat rooms. Internet usage is very low, reaching just 1.3% of the population in 2012 and as a result the Internet plays only a very small role in the political or economic life of the country.

The constitution and law provide for freedom of speech and press, and the government generally respects these rights. The law criminalizes defamatory and seditious libel, but is rarely applied. Its threatened application may stifle expression and journalists do engage in self-censorship. The constitution and laws prohibit arbitrary interference with privacy, family, home, or correspondence, and the government generally respects these prohibitions.

=== Somalia ===
The ongoing violence associated with the civil war in Somalia has and continues to dramatically affect the media environment.

Internet and mobile telephone services are widely available in large Somali cities, though poverty, illiteracy, and displacement limit access to these resources.

Initially the government did not restrict access to the Internet, and there are no reports that the government monitors e-mail or Internet chat rooms. Some factions reportedly monitor Internet activity.

Somalia's new provisional federal constitution, adopted by the National Constituent Assembly in August 2012, provides for freedom of speech and the press. At the end of 2012 the government was debating new legislative initiatives, including a telecommunications bill, a revised media law, and a Communications Act. There was significant international support for media law reform, and an intensive effort to undertake such changes was expected in early 2013. However, given the government's inability to impose its authority over much of Somalia, the practical implications of any new laws remained unclear.

On 8 January 2014 the Islamist militia group al-Shabaab announced that it is banning the Internet in the areas of Somalia that it controls. Internet Service Providers were given 15 days to terminate their service and warned of sanctions for non-compliance. "Any company or individual that is found ignoring the call will be considered to be working with the enemy", the statement said. Al-Shabaab is on Reporters Without Borders list of "Predators of Freedom of Information".

In September 2012 al-Shabaab claimed responsibility for the Mogadishu abduction and beheading of online journalist Abdirahman Mohamed Ali.

In 2023 the Somali state started with imposing a ban on TikTok, Telegram, and 1xBet.

=== South Africa ===
- Rated "free" in Freedom on the Net by Freedom House in 2009 (score 24), 2011 (score 26), 2012 (score 26), 2013 (score 26), 2014 (score 26), and 2015 (score 27).
- Not individually classified by ONI, but is included in the regional overview for sub-Saharan Africa.

Digital media freedom is generally respected in South Africa. Political content is not censored, and neither bloggers nor content creators are targeted for their online activities.

In 2006, the government of South Africa began prohibiting sites hosted in the country from displaying X18 (explicitly sexual) and XXX content (including child pornography and depictions of violent sexual acts); site owners who refuse to comply are punishable under the Film and Publications Act 1996. In 2007 a South African "sex blogger" was arrested.

=== Swaziland ===
There are no official government restrictions on access to the Internet. There are reports that the government monitors e-mail, Facebook, and Internet chat rooms.

The constitution provides for freedom of speech and press, but the king may deny these rights at his discretion, and the government does at times restrict these rights, especially regarding political issues or the royal family. The law empowers the government to ban publications if they are deemed "prejudicial or potentially prejudicial to the interests of defense, public safety, public order, public morality, or public health."

In March 2012 the Times of Swaziland reported that a number of senators asked that the government take legal action against individuals who criticized King Mswati III on social networking sites. Minister of Justice Mgwagwa Gamedze backed the calls and said he would look for "international laws" that could be used to charge offenders.

=== Tanzania ===
There are no government restrictions on access to the Internet; however, the government monitors Web sites that criticize the government. Police also monitor the Internet to combat illegal activities.

The constitution provides for freedom of speech, but does not explicitly provide for freedom of the press. The law generally prohibits arbitrary interference with privacy, family, home, or correspondence without a search warrant, but the government does not consistently respect these prohibitions. It is widely believed that security forces monitor telephones and correspondence of some citizens and foreign residents. The actual nature and extent of this practice is unknown.

=== Togo ===
There are no known government restrictions on access to the Internet or reports the government monitors e-mail or Internet chat rooms without judicial oversight. Although the constitution provides for freedom of speech and press, the government restricts these rights.

The constitution and law prohibit arbitrary interference with privacy, family, home, or correspondence, and the government generally respects these prohibitions. In criminal cases a judge or senior police official may authorize searches of private residences. Citizens believe the government monitors telephones and correspondence, although such surveillance has not been confirmed.

== See also ==
- Internet censorship and surveillance in Asia
- Internet censorship and surveillance in Europe
- Internet censorship and surveillance in Oceania
- Internet censorship and surveillance in the Americas
- Spying on United Nations leaders by United States diplomats
- Global Internet Freedom Task Force
