= Internet censorship and surveillance in Oceania =

Internet censorship and surveillance by country (2018): Pervasive Substantial / Selective Little or none; Unclassified / No data

This list of Internet censorship and surveillance in Oceania provides information on the types and levels of Internet censorship and surveillance that is occurring in countries in Oceania.

Detailed country by country information on Internet censorship and surveillance is provided in the Freedom on the Net reports from Freedom House, by the OpenNet Initiative, by Reporters Without Borders, and in the Country Reports on Human Rights Practices from the U.S. State Department Bureau of Democracy, Human Rights, and Labor. The ratings produced by several of these organizations are summarized below as well as in the Censorship by country article.

== Country list ==
=== Australia ===
- Rated "free" by Freedom House in Freedom on the Net in 2011 (score 17), 2012 (score 16), 2013 (score 17), 2014 (score 17), and 2015 (score 19).
- No evidence of filtering found by ONI in 2009. There is no individual ONI country profile for Australia, but it is included in the regional overview for Australia and New Zealand.
- Listed as Under Surveillance by RWB from 2009 to the present.

Australia does not allow content that would be classified "RC" (Refused Classification or banned) or "X18+" (hardcore non-violent pornography or very hardcore shock value) to be hosted within Australia and considers such content "prohibited"/"potentially prohibited" outside Australia, and Australia also prohibits cyberbullying or hate speech across Internet chat rooms; it also requires most other age-restricted content sites to verify a user's age before allowing access. Since January 2008 material that would be likely to be classified "R18+" or "MA15+" and which is not behind such an age verification service (and, for MA15+, which also meets other criteria such as provided for profit, or contains certain media types) also fits the category of "prohibited" or "potentially prohibited". The regulator ACMA can order local sites which do not comply taken down, and overseas sites added to a blacklist provided to makers of PC-based filtering software.

Australia is classified as "under surveillance" by Reporters Without Borders due to the internet filtering legislation proposed by Minister Stephen Conroy. Regardless, as of August 2010 and the outcome of the 2010 election, it would be highly unlikely for the filter to pass the Senate if proposed due to the close numbers of seats held by Labor and the Coalition, who Joe Hockey says do not support it.

In June 2011 two Australian ISPs, Telstra and Optus, confirmed they would voluntary block access to a list of child abuse websites provided by the Australian Communications and Media Authority and more websites on a list compiled by unnamed international organizations from mid-year.

In May 2013, Senator Scott Ludlam questioned the Department and Minister for Communications – and 3 agencies were identified as using section 313 powers within Australian legislation to block websites, two of which being The Australian Federal Police and the Australian Securities and Investments Commission.

In June 2015 legislation to force ISPs to block access to websites that link to copyrighted material was passed through the Senate. The new legislation will allow rights holders to obtain court orders to block overseas content that are found to contain copyrighted material. The legislation does not however extend to the use of VPN services, bringing into question the effectiveness of the legislation.

=== Fiji ===
- Not individually classified by ONI.

There are no government restrictions on general public access to the Internet, but evidence suggests that the government monitors private e-mails of citizens as well as Internet traffic in an attempt to control antigovernment reports by anonymous bloggers.

From 2006 to 2014, the country operated under a military-led government and had no constitution or functioning parliament from 2009. A new constitution was introduced in 2013, and multi-party elections in 2014 restored a parliamentary form of government. During the interim military regime, a series of decrees were issued, including the Public Order Amendment Decree (POAD), the Media Decree, and the Crime Decree. The POAD gives the government the power to detain persons on suspicion of "endangering public safety or the preservation of the peace"; defines terrorism as any act designed to advance a political, religious, or ideological cause that could "reasonably be regarded" as intended to compel a government to do or refrain from doing any act or to intimidate the public or a section thereof; and makes religious vilification and attempts to sabotage or undermine the economy offenses punishable by fines and/or imprisonment. The POAD also permits military personnel to search persons and premises without a warrant from a court and to take photographs, fingerprints, and measurements of any person. Police and military officers may enter private premises to break up any meeting considered unlawful. The Media Decree prohibits "irresponsible reporting" and provides for government censorship of the media. The Crimes Decree includes criticism of the government in its definition of the crime of sedition, including statements made in other countries by any person. By decree all telephone and Internet service users must register their personal details with telephone and Internet providers, including their name, birth date, home address, left thumbprint, and photographic identification.

=== New Zealand ===
- Not individually classified by ONI, but is included in the regional overview for Australia and New Zealand.

Since February 2010 Department of Internal Affairs offers to ISPs voluntary Internet filtering. Participating providers route suspect destination IP addresses to the Department, which blocks inappropriate HTTP requests. Other packets are routed back to correct networks. List of blocked addresses is secret.

In March 2019, several websites disseminating footage of the Christchurch mosque shooting became blocked by major ISPs in New Zealand, such as 4chan, 8chan, and LiveLeak.

=== Papua New Guinea ===
Only 2.3% of the population of Papua New Guinea had access to the Internet in 2012.

There are no government restrictions on access to the Internet or credible reports that the government monitors e-mail or Internet chat rooms without judicial oversight. Individuals and groups engage in the expression of views via the Internet, including by e-mail.

The constitution provides for freedom of speech and press, and the government generally respects these rights in practice. Newspapers offer a variety of editorial viewpoints and report on controversial topics. There is no evidence of officially sanctioned government censorship, although newspaper editors complained of intimidation tactics aimed at influencing coverage. There were some examples of police officers targeting journalists who negatively covered police activities. Although the constitution prohibits arbitrary interference with privacy, family, home, or correspondence, there are instances of abuse.

== See also ==
- Internet censorship and surveillance in Africa
- Internet censorship and surveillance in Asia
- Internet censorship and surveillance in Europe
- Internet censorship and surveillance in the Americas
