= Internet censorship and surveillance in the Americas =

Internet censorship and surveillance by country (2018): Pervasive Substantial / Selective Little or none; Unclassified / No data

This list of Internet censorship and surveillance in the Americas provides information on the types and levels of Internet censorship and surveillance that is occurring in countries in the Americas.

Detailed country by country information on Internet censorship and surveillance is provided in the Freedom on the Net reports from Freedom House, by the OpenNet Initiative, by Reporters Without Borders, and in the Country Reports on Human Rights Practices from the U.S. State Department Bureau of Democracy, Human Rights, and Labor. The ratings produced by several of these organizations are summarized below as well as in the Censorship by country article.

== Classifications ==
The level of Internet censorship and surveillance in a country is classified in one of the four categories: pervasive, substantial, selective, and little or no censorship or surveillance. The classifications are based on the classifications and ratings from the Freedom on the Net reports by Freedom House supplemented with information from the OpenNet Initiative (ONI), Reporters Without Borders (RWB), and the Country Reports on Human Rights Practices by the U.S. State Department Bureau of Democracy, Human Rights, and Labor.

Pervasive censorship or surveillance: A country is classified as engaged in pervasive censorship or surveillance when it often censors political, social, and other content, is engaged in mass surveillance of the Internet, and retaliates against citizens who circumvent censorship or surveillance with imprisonment or other sanctions. A country is included in the "pervasive" category when it:

- is rated as "not free" with a total score of 71 to 100 in the Freedom on the Net (FOTN) report from Freedom House,
- is rated "not free" in FOTN or is not rated in FOTN and
  - is included on the "Internet enemies" list from Reporters Without Borders, or
  - when the OpenNet Initiative categorizes the level of Internet filtering as pervasive in any of the four areas (political, social, conflict/security, and Internet tools) for which they test.

Substantial censorship or surveillance: Countries included in this classification are engaged in substantial Internet censorship and surveillance. This includes countries where a number of categories are subject to a medium level of filtering or many categories are subject to a low level of filtering. A country is included in the "substantial" category when it:

- is not included in the "pervasive" category, and
  - is rated as "not free" in the Freedom on the Net (FOTN) report from Freedom House, or
  - is rated "partly free" or is not rated in FOTN, and
    - is included on the "Internet enemies" list from Reporters Without Borders, or
    - when the OpenNet Initiative categorizes the level of Internet filtering as pervasive or substantial in any of the four areas (political, social, conflict/security, and Internet tools) for which they test.

Selective censorship or surveillance: Countries included in this classification were found to practice selective Internet censorship and surveillance. This includes countries where a small number of specific sites are blocked or censorship targets a small number of categories or issues. A country is included in the "selective" category when it:

- is not included in the "pervasive" or "substantial" categories, and
  - is rated as "partly free" in the Freedom on the Net (FOTN) report from Freedom House, or
  - is included on the "Internet enemies" list from Reporters Without Borders, or
  - is not rated in FOTN and the OpenNet Initiative categorizes the level of Internet filtering as selective in any of the four areas (political, social, conflict/security, and Internet tools) for which they test.

Little or no censorship or surveillance: A country is included in the "little or no censorship or surveillance" category when it is not included in the "pervasive", "substantial" or "selective" categories.

This classification includes countries that are listed as "free" on the Freedom on the Net list from Freedom House, are not listed as "Enemies of the Internet" by Reporters Without Borders (RWB), and for which no evidence of Internet filtering was found by the OpenNet Initiative (ONI) in any of the four areas (political, social, conflict/security, and Internet tools) for which they test. Other controls such as voluntary filtering, self-censorship, and other types of public or private action to limit child pornography, hate speech, defamation, or theft of intellectual property often exist. The various nation sections, below, include ratings by ONI, RWB, etc.

== Pervasive censorship or surveillance ==
=== Cuba ===
- Rated "not free" in Freedom on the Net by Freedom House in 2009 (score 88), 2011 (score 87), 2012 (score 86), 2013 (score 86), 2014 (score 84), 2015 (score 81), 2016 (score 79), 2017 (score 79), and 2018 (score 79).
- Listed as an Internet enemy by RWB in 2011.
- Not categorized by ONI due to lack of data.

Cuba has the lowest ratio of computers per inhabitant in Latin America, and the lowest internet access ratio of all the Western hemisphere. Citizens have to use government controlled "access points", where their activity is monitored through IP blocking, keyword filtering and browsing history checking. The government cites its citizens' access to internet services are limited due to high costs and the American embargo, but there are reports concerning the will of the government to control access to uncensored information both from and to the outer world. The Cuban government continues to imprison independent journalists for contributing reports through the Internet to web sites outside of Cuba.

Even with the lack of precise figures due to the secretive nature of the regime, testimonials from independent bloggers, activists, and international watchers support the view that it is difficult for most people to access the web and that harsh punishments for individuals that do not follow government policies are the norm. The Committee to Protect Journalists has pointed to Cuba as one of the ten most censored countries around the world.

== Substantial censorship or surveillance ==
=== Venezuela ===
- Rated "partly free" by Freedom House in Freedom on the Net in 2011 (score 46), 2012 (score 48), 2013 (score 53), 2014 (score 56), and 2015 (score 57) and "not free" in 2016 (score 60), 2017 (score 63), and 2018 (score 66).
- Classified by ONI as no evidence of Internet filtering in the political, social, conflict/security, and Internet tools areas in October 2012.

In December 2010, the government of Venezuela approved a law named "Social Responsibility in Radio, Television and Electronic Media" (Ley de Responsabilidad Social en Radio, Televisión y Medios Electrónicos). The law is intended to exercise control over content that could "entice felonies", "create social distress", or "question the legitimate constituted authority". The law indicates that the website's owners will be responsible for any information and contents published, and that they will have to create mechanisms that could restrict without delay the distribution of content that could go against the aforementioned restrictions. The fines for individuals who break the law will be of the 10% of the person's last year's income. The law was received with criticism from the opposition on the grounds that it is a violation of freedom of speech protections stipulated in the Venezuelan constitution, and that it encourages censorship and self-censorship.

In November 2013 the Venezuelan telecommunications regulator, CONATEL, began ordering ISPs to block websites that provide the black market exchange rate. ISPs must comply within 24 hours or face sanctions, which could include the loss of their concessions. Within a month ISPs had restricted access to more than 100 URLs. The order is based on Venezuela's 2004 media law which makes it illegal to disseminate information that could "sow panic among the general public".

Starting on 12 February 2014 the Venezuelan government blocked users' online images on Twitter, including images of protests against shortages and the world's highest inflation rate. It was reported that the image blocking had ended by the morning of 15 February.

In May 2015, Juan Carlos Alemán, a Venezuelan official speaking on television, announced that the Venezuelan government was in the process of removing the use of servers from Google and Mozilla and using Venezuelan satellites in order to have more control over the internet of Venezuelans.

CONATEL verifies that ISPs do not allow their subscribers to access content in their criteria which is "an aggression to the Venezuelan people" and "causes unstabilization", and can force ISPs to block web sites in opposition to the government's interests. By 2014, there could be possible automations of DirecTV, CANTV, Movistar and regulation of YouTube and Twitter.

Following the election establishing the 2017 Constituent National Assembly, the president of the assembly Delcy Rodríguez decreed that there would be "regulation of the emission of messages of hatred and intolerance (and) strong penalties when it is in presence of a crime of hatred and intolerance", singling out opposition politicians while also threatening those who criticized her brother, Jorge Rodriguez. On 8 November 2017, the pro-government Constituent National Assembly approved the Law against Hatred. The Office of the Special Rapporteur for Freedom of Expression of the Inter-American Commission on Human Rights (CIDH), expressed concern that the law "establishes exorbitant criminal sanctions and powers to censor traditional media and the Internet, in contradiction with international standards regarding freedom of expression". The Rapporteur explained that the law was designed to allow the Venezuelan State to punish "expressions that should be protected by the right to freedom of expression", and that the State may even suppress content, as the law gives them the power to block and revoke licenses under the law in regards to any and all media, including the Internet.

By 2017, Freedom House declared in its Freedom on the Net 2017 report that Venezuela's internet was ranked as "not free", citing the blockage of social media applications, political content being blocked, attacks of online reports by law enforcement and the arrests of internet users. Since late-2017, the Venezuelan government censored the website El Pitazo, blocking it with DNS methods.

Following the 2018 Venezuelan presidential election, the website for El Nacional was sanctioned by the state-run CONATEL on 22 May 2018, with the violation of Article 27 of the Social Responsibility in Radio, Television and Electronic Media being cited by the Venezuelan government.

Some major pornographic websites such as PornHub, XVideos, YouPorn were blocked in Venezuela in June 2018.

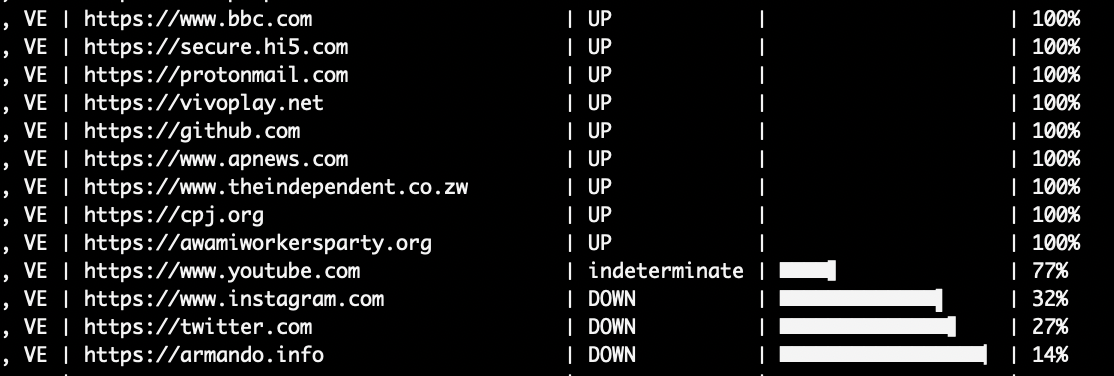
NetBlocks showing blocks of Instagram, Twitter and YouTube in Venezuela on 21 January 2019

In the evening of 12 January 2019, the NetBlocks internet observatory had collected technical evidence of the blocking of all editions of Wikipedia in Venezuela. The restrictions were being implemented by CANTV, the state-run and largest telecommunications provider in the country. NetBlocks identified a major network disruption affecting the telecommunications infrastructure, which coincided with other restrictions affecting Venezuelans’ ability to communicate and access information during the previous 24 hours. The block happened after a Wikipedia article listed newly appointed National Assembly president Juan Guaidó as “president number 51 of the Bolivarian Republic of Venezuela.” The collected data also showed that a number of local websites had been recently restricted, indicating that recent political instability could be the underlying cause for what may be a tightening regime of internet control.

One of the largest outages was reported on 21 January 2019 during the 2019 Venezuelan presidential crisis. Internet access to Instagram, Twitter and YouTube was blocked by state-run provider CANTV.

== Selective censorship or surveillance ==
=== Brazil ===
- Rated "partly free" by Freedom House in Freedom on the Net in 2017 (score 33) and 2016 (score 32), "free" in 2015 (score 29) and 2014 (score 30), "partly free" in 2013 (score 32), "free" in 2012 (score 27), 2011 (score 29), and 2009 (score 30).
- Not individually classified by ONI, but is included in the regional overview for Latin America.

There are no government restrictions on access to the Internet or credible reports that the government monitors e-mail or Internet chat rooms. Individuals and groups can engage in the expression of views via the Internet, including by e‑mail. A continuing trend is for private individuals and official bodies to take legal action against Internet service providers (ISPs) and providers of online social media platforms, such as Google, Facebook, and Orkut, holding them accountable for content posted to or provided by users of the platform. Judicial rulings often result in the forced removal of content from the Internet.

Brazilian legislation restricts the freedom of expression (Paim Law), directed especially to publications considered racist (such as neo-nazi sites). The Brazilian Constitution also prohibits anonymity of journalists.

In September 2012 an elections court in Brazil ordered the arrest of Google's most senior executive in the country, after the company failed to take down YouTube videos attacking a local mayoral candidate. The stringent 1965 Electoral Code bans campaign ads that “offend the dignity or decorum” of a candidate. Google is appealing the order, which comes after a similar decision by another Brazilian elections judge. In that case, the judge found a different senior executive responsible for violating local election law after the company refused to take down a YouTube video mocking a mayoral candidate. That decision was overturned by another judge who wrote that “Google is not the intellectual author of the video, it did not post the file, and for that reason it cannot be punished for its propagation.”

=== Canada ===
- Rated "free" in Freedom on the Net by Freedom House in 2014 (score 15) and 2015 (score 16).
- Listed as an internet enemy by RWB in 2016.
- No evidence of filtering found by ONI in 2009. There is no individual ONI country profile for Canada, but it is included in the regional overview for the United States and Canada.

Information, such as names of young offenders or information on criminal trials subject to publication bans, which the government is actively attempting to keep out of Canadian broadcast and print media is sometimes available to Canadian users via the Internet from sites hosted outside Canada.

On November 18, 2019, the Federal Court of Canada approved an interlocutory injunction requiring Canadian ISPs to block a pirate IPTV service.

Project Cleanfeed Canada (cybertip.ca) decides what sites are child pornographic in nature and transmits those lists to the voluntarily participating ISPs who can then block the pages for their users. However, some authors, bloggers and digital rights lawyers argue that they are accountable to no one and could be adding non pornographic sites to their list without public knowledge.

In 2022, the Online Streaming Act (Bill C-11) passed through the House of Commons of Canada, the legislation would have the Canadian Radio-television and Telecommunications Commission (CRTC) require tech companies to contribute payment and for streaming services to promote Canadian content. The CRTC stated that the legislation would give them the power to regulate user-generated content, but that they would not seek to do so.

In 2021, Justice Minister David Lametti introduced the Online Harms Act (Bill C-36) to remove online posts and content considered to be hateful and fine those espousing it for up to $50,000, stating that the internet has become the new public square and "that public square should be a safe space". A new version of the legislation was drafted in 2022 where a Digital Safety Commissioner would take down and oversee internet content considered harmful. The Canadian government gathered an advisory panel, who proposed they take down online content that was "misleading political communications", "propaganda", or content that promoted "unrealistic body image".

Reporters Without Borders listed the Online News Act (Bill C-18), and Meta's response to it, as one of the causes for lowering Canada's place by seven spots on the World Press Freedom Index between 2024 and 2025.

In 2025, Minister of Public Safety Gary Anandasangaree introduced the Strong Borders Act (Bill C-2) in the 45th Canadian Parliament, which would allow for law enforcement and other authorities to obtain Canadian ISP data without a warrant.

=== Colombia ===
- Rated "free" in Freedom on the Net by Freedom House in 2014 (score 30) and "partly free" in 2015, 2016, and 2017 (scores 32, 32, and 32).
- Classified as engaged in selective Internet filtering in the social area with little or no evidence of filtering in the political, conflict/security, or Internet tools areas by the OpenNet Initiative in 2011.

Because of threats from local drug cartels or other gangs and individuals, many journalists practice self-censorship, including many in Colombia who avoid reporting on corruption, drug trafficking, or violence by armed groups because of such threats.

Colombian law requires ISPs to monitor their content and report any illegal activity to the government. Colombia's “Internet Sano” (healthy Internet) campaign calls for public education on “decent” ways of using the Internet as well as penalties for improper use. Some websites are blocked as part of the Internet Sano program. Child pornography is illegal in Colombia.

ONI testing on two Colombian ISPs revealed evidence of one blocked website; the government has also taken measures aimed at reducing children's exposure to online pornography. The government has passed laws addressing online privacy, electronic surveillance, and cybercrime, although Colombia's national intelligence service has reportedly engaged in extrajudicial surveillance. A pending law governing digital copyright, which was proposed as a measure of compliance with Colombia's free trade agreement with the United States, is currently being contested at the Supreme Court by advocates who assert that the law violates the country's constitution by limiting citizens' rights to access information.

=== Ecuador ===
- Rated "partly free" in Freedom on the Net by Freedom House in 2013 (score 37), 2014 (score 37), and 2015 (score 37).
- Ecuador is not individually classified by ONI and does not appear on the RWB lists.

There is no widespread blocking or filtering of websites in Ecuador and access to blogs and social media platforms such as Facebook, Twitter, and YouTube is generally free and open. There were no government restrictions on access to the Internet or credible reports that the government monitored e-mail or Internet chat rooms. However, on 11 July 2012 the government passed a new telecommunications regulation, requiring that ISPs fulfill all information requests from the superintendent of telecommunications, allowing access to client addresses and information without a judicial order.

Standard defamation laws apply to content posted online. Attempts to censor statements made in times of heightened political sensitivity have been reported, as have alleged instances of censorship via the overly broad application of copyright to content critical of the government.

Self-censorship of comments critical of the government is encouraged. In January 2013, for example, President Correa called for the National Secretary of Intelligence (SENAIN) to investigate two Twitter users who had published disparaging comments about him, an announcement which sent a warning to others not to post comments critical of the president. At the president's request, two news sites La Hora and El Comercio suspended the reader comments sections of their websites. While there are no official constraints on organizing protests over the Internet, warnings from the president stating that the act of protesting will be interpreted as "an attempt to destabilize the government" have undoubtedly discouraged some from organizing and participating in protests.

Ecuador's new "Organic Law on Communications" was passed in June 2013. The law recognizes a right to communication. Media companies are required to collect and store user information. “Media lynching”, which appears to extend to any accusation of corruption or investigation of a public official—even those that are supported with evidence, is prohibited. Websites bear “ultimate responsibility” for all content they host, including content authored by third parties. The law creates a new media regulator to prohibit the dissemination of “unbalanced” information and bans non-degreed journalists from publishing, effectively outlawing much investigative reporting and citizen journalism.

=== Mexico ===
- Classified as "partly free" in the Freedom on the Net report from Freedom House in 2011 (score 32), 2012 (score 37), 2013 (score 38), 2014 (score 39), and 2015 (score 39).
- Classified by ONI as no evidence of filtering in 2011.

Mexican law provides for freedom of speech and press, and the government generally respects these rights in practice. There were no government restrictions on access to the Internet or credible reports that the government monitors e-mail or Internet chat rooms. Individuals and groups can engage in the expression of views via the Internet, including by e-mail.

Transnational Criminal Organizations (TCOs) exercise an increasing influence over media outlets and reporters, at times directly threatening individuals who published critical views of crime groups. As citizens increasingly use social media Web sites such as Twitter and Facebook to obtain and share drug-related news, violence against the users of these sites is rising dramatically. The threats and violence lead to self-censorship in many cases.

In May 2009, the Mexican Federal Electoral Institute (IFE), asked YouTube to remove a parody of Fidel Herrera, governor of the state of Veracruz. Negative advertising in political campaigns is prohibited by present law, although the video appears to be made by a regular citizen which would make it legal. It was the first time a Mexican institution intervened directly with the Internet.

=== United States ===
- Rated "free" by Freedom House in Freedom on the Net in 2011 (score 13), 2012 (score 12), 2013 (score 17), 2014 (score 19), 2015 (score 19), 2016 (score 18), and 2017 (score 21).
- Listed as an Internet Enemy by RWB in 2014.
- Classified by ONI as no evidence of filtering in 2009. There is no individual ONI country profile for the United States, but it is included in the regional overview for the United States and Canada.

Most online expressions are protected by the First Amendment to the United States Constitution, but laws concerning libel, intellectual property, and child pornography still determine if certain content can be legally published online. The Internet in the United States is highly regulated, supported by a complex set of legally binding and privately mediated mechanisms. Internet access by individuals in the US is not subject to technical censorship, but can be penalized by law for violating the rights of others. As in other countries, the potential for legal liability for civil violations, including defamation and copyright, constrains the publishers of Internet content in the United States. This can have a "chilling effect" and lead to self-censorship of lawful online content and conduct. Content-control software is sometimes used by businesses, libraries, schools, and government offices to limit access to specific types of content.

Public dialogue, legislative debate, and judicial review have produced filtering strategies in the United States that are different from those found in most of the rest of the world. Many government-mandated attempts to regulate content have been barred on First Amendment grounds, often after lengthy legal battles. However, the government has been able to exert pressure indirectly where it cannot directly censor. With the exception of child pornography, content restrictions tend to rely more on the removal of content than blocking; most often these controls rely upon the involvement of private parties, backed by state encouragement or the threat of legal action. In contrast to much of the rest of the world, where ISPs are subject to state mandates, most content regulation in the United States occurs at the private or voluntary level.

In 2014, the United States was added to Reporters Without Borders's (RWB's) list of "Enemies of the Internet", a category of countries with the highest level of Internet censorship and surveillance. RWB stated that the U.S. "... has undermined confidence in the Internet and its own standards of security" and that "U.S. surveillance practices and decryption activities are a direct threat to investigative journalists, especially those who work with sensitive sources for whom confidentiality is paramount and who are already under pressure."

== Little or no censorship or surveillance ==
=== Argentina ===
- Rated "free" by Freedom House in Freedom on the Net in 2012 (score 26), 2013 (score 27), 2014 (score 27), and 2015 (score 27).
- Not individually classified by ONI, but is included in the regional overview for Latin America.

The regulation of Internet content addresses largely the same concerns and strategies seen in North America and Europe, focusing on combating the spread of child pornography and restricting child access to age-inappropriate material. As Internet usage in Argentina increases, so do defamation, hate speech, copyright, and privacy issues.

In August 2011 a judge ordered all ISPs to block the site LeakyMails, a Web site that obtains and publishes documents exposing corruption in Argentina. In response some ISPs blocked the website IP address 216.239.32.2 which is linked to more than one million blogs hosted on Google's Blogger service disrupting the access to all of them.

In November 2012 the CNC (Spanish: Comision Nacional De Comunicaciones) ordered the blocking of websites that contained information about bootloader unlocking of netbooks supplied by the Argentine Government. The legality of these actions in Argentina remains controversial.

In July 2014 the CNC (Spanish: Comision Nacional De Comunicaciones) ordered local ISPs to block The Pirate Bay due an injunction of CAPIF (Spanish: Cámara Argentina de Productores de Fonogramas) against the popular Torrent index. CAPIF is an Argentinian music industry group and a member of International Federation of the Phonographic Industry (IFPI). The CNC is an agency of the Argentine Government created to certify wireless devices; to regulate communications by radio, television, wire, satellite, cable and postal services. In retaliation for the blocking, the online site of CAPIF was hacked and turned into a Pirate Bay Proxy.

As of 2017, any and all websites previously blocked are no longer blocked due to public criticism and lack of interest.

=== Bahamas ===
- The Bahamas is not individually classified in Freedom House's Freedom on the Net reports, or by ONI, and does not appear on the RWB lists.

Access to the Internet is unrestricted. There were no government restrictions on access to the Internet or credible reports that the government monitors e-mail or Internet chat rooms without judicial oversight. The constitution provides for freedom of speech and press, and the government generally respects these rights in practice. Strict and antiquated libel laws dating to British legal codes are seldom invoked.

=== Belize ===
There are few government restrictions on access to the Internet and no credible reports that the government monitors e-mail or Internet chat rooms without judicial oversight. The government-owned telecommunications company blocks Voice over Internet Protocol (VOIP) services.

The law provides for freedom of speech and press and the government generally respects these rights in practice. The constitution prohibits arbitrary interference with privacy, family, home, or correspondence, and government authorities generally respect these prohibitions in practice. Law enforcement agencies may, with judicial oversight, intercept communications to obtain information in the interest of "national security, public order, public morals, and public safety." The law defines communication broadly to encompass the possible interception of communication by post, telephone, facsimile, e-mails, chat, and/or text messages whether encrypted or unencrypted or whether provided by public or private providers.

=== Bolivia ===
There are no government restrictions on access to the Internet. On 21 October 2012, Vice President Garcia Linera stated that the government records the names of people who insult President Morales on social media sites.

The Bolivian constitution and law provide for freedom of speech and press. Although the government generally respects these rights, in at least two cases in 2012, the government used the anti-racism law to restrict both rights. Bolivian law prohibits arbitrary interference with privacy, family, home, or correspondence and the government generally respects these prohibitions, but there have been allegations that the government does not always respect the law.

=== Chile ===
- Not individually classified by ONI, but is included in the regional overview for Latin America.

The constitution provides for freedom of speech and press, and the government generally respects these rights in practice. There are no government restrictions on access to the Internet. Individuals and groups can engage in the peaceful expression of views via the Internet, including by electronic mail. While the Investigations Police (PDI) maintains a sexual crimes unit that monitors Web sites for child pornography and prosecutes individuals for selling, storing, or trading child pornography on the Internet, there were no reports that the government monitors e-mail or Internet chat rooms for other purposes.

=== Costa Rica ===
There are no government restrictions on access to the Internet or credible reports that the government monitors e-mail or Internet chat rooms without judicial oversight.

The constitution provides for freedom of speech and press, and the government generally respects these rights in practice. Individuals are generally free to criticize the government openly without reprisal. The law limits hate speech in publications with regard to ethnic origin, race, or color. The government continues to support legislation that imposes criminal penalties, including lengthy jail sentences instead of fines, for press infractions such as libel. Article 288, which includes amendments to the criminal code, establishes a sentence of between four and eight years' imprisonment for any individual trying to obtain inappropriately secret political information.

=== Dominican Republic ===
There are no government restrictions on access to the Internet or credible reports that the government monitors e-mail or Internet chat rooms without judicial oversight.

The constitution provides for freedom of speech and press, and the government generally respects these rights in practice. Individuals and groups are generally able to criticize the government publicly and privately without reprisal, although there have been incidents in which authorities intimidated journalists or other news professionals. The government denies using unauthorized wiretapping or other surreptitious methods to interfere with the private lives of individuals and families, however, human rights groups and opposition politicians allege that such interference does occur.

=== El Salvador ===
There are no government restrictions on access to the Internet or credible reports that the government monitors e-mail or Internet chat rooms without judicial oversight.

The constitution provides for freedom of speech and press, and the government generally respects these rights. According to the Salvadoran Association of Journalists (APES), the media practices self-censorship, especially in their reporting on gangs and narcotics trafficking. APES stated that many members of the media were afraid to report in detail on these subjects due to fear of retaliation from gangs and narcotics trafficking groups. The constitution prohibits arbitrary interference with privacy, family, home, or correspondence, and the government generally respects these prohibitions.

=== Guatemala ===
- Classified as no evidence of filtering by ONI in 2011.

Guatemala's constitution protects freedom of speech, freedom of the press, and individual privacy, however, government officials routinely violate these rights. Recent constitutional reforms have legalized various electronic surveillance techniques that threaten online privacy. The Ley de Proteccion Integral de la Niñez y Adolescencia (Law on the Protection of Children and Adolescents) permits the restriction of content for children younger than eighteen years of age if it is deemed harmful to their development. Media outlets and organizers of public events are required to evaluate and classify programmed content according to this law. The Ley de Emisión del Pensamiento (Law on Expression of Thought) prohibits libel, slander, and treason in printed form, and stipulates that the author of any publication containing an opinion that the judiciary considers to be subversive, morally damaging, or “disrespectful” of private life may be subject to punishment. The Law on Expression of Thought explicitly requires newspapers that have incorrectly attributed acts to or published false information about people or entities to publish any corrections, explanations, or refutations sent to them by those they have accused. In cases of printed material that involves treason, is subversive, is “damaging to morals", or contains slander or libel, newspapers may be subject to a trial by jury; decisions may be appealed within 48 hours. The law makes an exception when the offended party is a government employee or official: if the offending content concerns “purely official acts” related to government work, the case will be judged in a “court of honor", and the decision will be final and closed to appeal. The Ley de Orden Público (Law of Public Order) states that if the government has declared the country to be “in a state of siege", journalists must “refrain from publishing anything that might cause confusion or panic.”

=== Guyana ===
There are no government restrictions on access to the Internet or credible reports that the government monitors e-mail or Internet chat rooms without judicial oversight.

The law provides for freedom of speech including for members of the press, and the government generally respects this right in practice. Government officials use libel laws to suppress criticism. The law prohibits arbitrary interference with privacy, family, home, or correspondence, and the government generally respects these prohibitions in practice. A 2008 law allows for the interception of communications through a warrant issued by a judge, exceptions being in the case of a national emergency or where approval for a warrant is impracticable due to the urgency of the matter.

=== Haiti ===
There are no government restrictions on access to the Internet in Haiti or credible reports that the government monitors e-mail or Internet chat rooms without judicial oversight. Regardless, the effect of this is minor, as less than 4.8% of the country has access to a computer or mobile device.

The law provides for freedom of speech and press, and the government and elected officials generally respect these rights in practice. Journalists complain about defamation lawsuits that the government threatens or files against the press for statements made about public officials or private figures in the public arena. Defamation carries both criminal and civil penalties. Some journalists practice self-censorship on stories related to drug trafficking or allegations of business and political corruption, likely due to past patterns of retribution against activists and journalists engaged in investigative reporting. The law prohibits arbitrary interference with privacy, family, home, or correspondence, but the government does not always respect these prohibitions in practice.

=== Honduras ===
There are no government restrictions on access to the Internet or credible reports that the government monitors e-mail or Internet chat rooms without judicial oversight. The constitution and laws provide for freedom of speech and press, and the government generally respects these rights in practice. The constitution and law generally prohibit arbitrary interference with privacy, family, home, or correspondence.

Reports of harassment of journalists and social communicators (persons not employed as journalists, but who serve as bloggers or conduct public outreach for NGOs) continued to rise. There also were multiple reports of intimidation of members of the media and their families. Members of the media and NGOs stated that the press “self-censored” due to fear of reprisal from organized crime.

=== Nicaragua ===
There are no government restrictions on access to the Internet or Internet chat rooms; however, several NGOs claim the government monitors their e-mail. Individuals and groups engage in the expression of views via the Internet, including by e-mail and social media.

The constitution provides for freedom of speech and press, but the government used administrative, judicial, and financial means to limit the exercise of these rights. Although the law provides that the right to information cannot be subjected to censorship, it also establishes retroactive liability, including criminal penalties for libel and slander.

During the November 2012 municipal elections, a website that allowed voters to register complaints or allegations of election fraud was apparently hacked on several occasions and forced to shut for significant portions of the day. Certain NGOs claimed the website was tampered with to prevent dissemination of voter complaints. During 2012 there were several reported cases of threats and violence against the press. On 11 December, the spokesman of the Supreme Court of Justice publicly accused the online newsweekly Confidential of being financed by narcotics trafficking organizations, an allegation human rights groups said was politically motivated.

=== Panama ===
There are no government restrictions on access to the Internet, but there have been anecdotal reports that the government monitors private e-mails. In a few cases, law enforcement monitoring of suspects' computers led to arrests for sex crimes.

The constitution provides for freedoms of speech and press, but there have been attempts by the government to impede the media's freedom of expression and silence criticism of public officials. The Inter-American Commission on Human Rights, Inter-American Press Association, the NGO Reporters Without Borders, and other groups criticized government efforts to censor the press.

In February 2012 indigenous mining protests blocked the Pan American Highway near Vigui in the province of Veraguas and in San Félix District in the province of Chiriquí. The government cut off cell phone and Internet services in Veraguas and Chiriqui Provinces from 3–7 February during the protests.

The law prohibits arbitrary interference with privacy, family, home, or correspondence, and the government generally respects these prohibitions. Nevertheless, there have been complaints that in some cases law-enforcement authorities failed to follow legal requirements and conducted unauthorized searches. The law denies prosecutors authority to order wiretaps on their own and requires judicial oversight. During the year several citizens claimed to have been wiretapping targets after making statements critical of the government.

=== Paraguay ===
The law in Paraguay provides for freedom of speech and press, and the government generally respects these rights in practice. Individuals criticize the government publicly and privately, generally without reprisal or impediment. There are no government restrictions on access to the Internet or credible reports that the government monitored e-mail or Internet chat rooms. Individuals and groups could engage in the expression of views via the Internet, including by e-mail.

Because of their reporting, journalists are on occasion subjected to harassment, intimidation, and violence—primarily from drug trafficking gangs and criminal syndicates based in departments bordering Brazil but also from politicians. Political officials often retaliate against media criticism by invoking criminal libel laws and suing the media to intimidate journalists and suppress further investigations.

Following the 22 June 2012 parliamentary coup, the new government appears to be assuming complete control of the state-owned media and its hostility is affecting journalists with the privately owned media as well.

=== Peru ===
- Listed as no evidence in all areas (political, social, conflict/security, and Internet tools) by ONI in 2011.

There are no government restrictions on access to the Internet and no reports that the government monitors e-mail or Internet chat rooms. Individuals and groups engage in the free expression of views via the Internet, including by e-mail. The chief impediment to Internet access was a lack of infrastructure; the International Telecommunication Union reported that there were 31 Internet users per 100 inhabitants in 2009.

=== Suriname ===
There are no government restrictions on access to the Internet and the government asserts that it does not monitor e-mail or Internet chat rooms without judicial oversight. However, journalists, members of the political opposition and their supporters, and other independent entities report government interference or oversight of email and social media accounts.

The law provides for freedom of speech and press, and the government generally respects these rights in practice. Some media members practice self-censorship in response to pressure and intimidation by senior government officials or community leaders on journalists who publish negative stories about the administration. In addition many news outlets are affiliated with particular political parties, which discourages journalists from reporting on some subjects. The law prohibits arbitrary interference with privacy, family, home, or correspondence, and the government generally respects these prohibitions in practice. The law requires search warrants, which are issued by quasi-judicial officers who supervise criminal investigations.

=== Trinidad and Tobago ===
There are no government restrictions on access to the Internet or credible reports that the government monitors e-mail or Internet chat rooms without judicial oversight.

The constitution and the law provide for freedom of speech and press, and the government generally respects these rights in practice. The constitution and the law prohibit arbitrary interference with privacy, family, home, or correspondence, and the government generally respects these prohibitions in practice.

=== Uruguay ===
There are no government restrictions on access to or usage of the Internet or credible reports that the government monitors e-mail or Internet chat rooms without judicial oversight.

Uruguayan law provides for freedom of speech and press, and the government generally respects these rights in practice. An independent press, an effective judiciary, and a functioning democratic political system combine to ensure these rights. The law also prohibits arbitrary interference with privacy, family, home, or correspondence, and the government generally respects these prohibitions in practice.

== See also ==
- Internet censorship and surveillance in Africa
- Internet censorship and surveillance in Asia
- Internet censorship and surveillance in Europe
- Internet censorship and surveillance in Oceania
