= Afghanistan Telecom Regulatory Authority =

Government agency of Afghanistan

Afghanistan Telecom Regulatory Authority (ATRA)
- Formation: 2006
- Type: Government Authority
- Purpose: Regulating and expanding Afghanistan's telecom industry
- Location: Kabul, Afghanistan
- Region served: Afghanistan
- Chairman: Seyyed Moulvi Barat Shah Nadim Agha
- Website: http://atra.gov.af/

The Afghanistan Telecom Regulatory Authority (ATRA) is an Afghanistan government authority created in 2006 with the goal of regulating and expanding Afghanistan's telecom industry. ATRA works to establish an environment that encourages private investment in the growth of telecom and Internet services and infrastructure.

The current head of the authority is Seyyed Moulvi Barat Shah Nadim Agha.
