= Emirates Discussion Forum =

Internet forum focused on the affairs of the United Arab Emirates

Emirates Discussion Forum منتدى الحوار الإماراتي
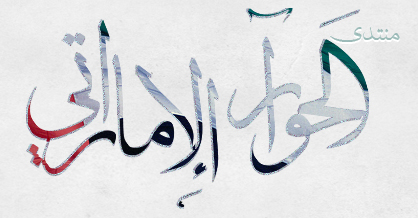
- Website type: Internet forum
- Available in: Arabic
- Country of origin: United Arab Emirates
- Website: uaehewar.net
- Launched: 2009; 17 years ago
- Current status: Suspended (since May 2017)

The Emirates Discussion Forum (Arabic: منتدى الحوار الإماراتي), or simply uaehewar.net, is an internet forum focusing on the affairs of the United Arab Emirates. Since its launch in the summer of 2009, it has been described as the UAE’s only credible online discussion forum, and was subjected to multiple censorship actions by UAE authorities.

== Overview ==
The site was established in August 2009 by a group of UAE intellectuals and internet activists to provide a genuine and free venue for debating national issues compared to state-controlled and subsidized media. Uaehewar.net is distinguished from other UAE internet forums by a wider margin of freedom, allowing therefore the discussion of topics deemed as taboos in the conservative UAE society. Furthermore, the anonymity provided by the forum atmosphere encourages voicing out political opinions and critiques that are not usually expressed in the public arena due to fear of persecution.

== Censorship and access disruptions ==
The first censorship action was carried out by UAE authorities in November 2009. The action specifically targeted an article entitled “Beyond the Biography of Allah” which offered an atheistic critique of monotheistic divinity, a taboo topic in the religiously conservative UAE society. However, since February 7, 2010, access to the website has been completely disrupted in the UAE; visitors receive a network error message. The US company that hosts the site, Host Rocket, confirmed that the inaccessibility in the UAE is not due to any technical problem. The unconventional method of blocking by the TRA has been interpreted by many as a plan to identify the owners of the website. On 14 March 2010, the Emirati lawyer and human rights activist Abdul Hamid Alkamiti filed a complaint to the prosecutor general in Dubai against the Telecomm Regulatory Authority demanding the disclosure of reasons behind the censorship action. As of May 2017, the website account had been suspended and not accessible to anyone in any part of the world.
