= NetFreedom Task Force =

The NetFreedom Task Force, previously called the Global Internet Freedom Task Force (GIFT), is an initiative within the U.S. Department of State that acts as the State Department's policy-coordinating and outreach body for Internet freedom. The members address Internet freedom issues by drawing on the department's multidisciplinary expertise in international communications policy, human rights, democratization, business advocacy, corporate social responsibility, and relevant countries and regions. It reports to the Secretary through Under Secretary for Economic, Business, and Agricultural Affairs and Under Secretary for Democracy and Global Affairs. The task force coordinates the State Department's work with other agencies, U.S. Internet companies, non-governmental organizations, academic researchers, and other stakeholders.

== History ==
The Global Internet Freedom Task Force was established by United States Secretary of State Condoleezza Rice in February 2006 "to monitor and respond to threats to freedom of expression on the internet".

The task force considers foreign policy aspects of Internet freedom, including:

- The use of technology to restrict access to political content and the impact of such censorship efforts on U.S. companies;
- The use of technology to track and repress dissidents; and
- Efforts to modify Internet governance structures in order to restrict the free flow of information.

The task force was mentioned by U.S. Secretary of State Hillary Clinton in a speech on Internet Freedom delivered at the Newseum in Washington, D.C., on January 21, 2010, stating "We are reinvigorating the Global Internet Freedom Task Force as a forum for addressing threats to internet freedom around the world, and urging U.S. media companies to take a proactive role in challenging foreign governments' demands for censorship and surveillance." The task force was renamed the NetFreedom Task Force shortly thereafter.

== See also ==
- Digital rights – the human rights that allow individuals to access, use, create, and publish digital media or to access and use computers, other electronic devices, or communications networks
- Internet censorship – the control or suppression of what can be accessed, published, or viewed on the Internet
- Open Technology Fund (OTF) – a U.S. Government funded program created in 2012 at Radio Free Asia to support global Internet freedom technologies
- Right to Internet access – the view that all people must be able to access the Internet in order to exercise and enjoy their rights to freedom of speech
