= Internet censorship and surveillance in Europe =

Internet censorship and surveillance by country (2018): Pervasive Substantial / Selective Little or none; Unclassified / No data

This list of Internet censorship and surveillance in Europe provides information on the types and levels of Internet censorship and surveillance that is occurring in countries in Europe.

Detailed country by country information on Internet censorship and surveillance is provided in the Freedom on the Net reports from Freedom House, by the OpenNet Initiative, by Reporters Without Borders, and in the Country Reports on Human Rights Practices from the U.S. State Department Bureau of Democracy, Human Rights, and Labor. The ratings produced by several of these organizations are summarized below as well as in the Censorship by country article.

== Classifications ==
The level of Internet censorship and surveillance in a country is classified in one of the four categories: pervasive, substantial, selective, and little or no censorship or surveillance. The classifications are based on the classifications and ratings from the Freedom on the Net reports by Freedom House supplemented with information from the OpenNet Initiative (ONI), Reporters Without Borders (RWB), and the Country Reports on Human Rights Practices by the U.S. State Department Bureau of Democracy, Human Rights, and Labor.

Pervasive censorship or surveillance: A country is classified as engaged in pervasive censorship or surveillance when it often censors political, social, and other content, is engaged in mass surveillance of the Internet, and retaliates against citizens who circumvent censorship or surveillance with imprisonment or other sanctions. A country is included in the "pervasive" category when it:

- is rated as "not free" with a total score of 71 to 100 in the Freedom on the Net (FOTN) report from Freedom House,
- is rated "not free" in FOTN or is not rated in FOTN and
  - is included on the "Internet enemies" list from Reporters Without Borders, or
  - when the OpenNet Initiative categorizes the level of Internet filtering as pervasive in any of the four areas (political, social, conflict/security, and Internet tools) for which they test.

Substantial censorship or surveillance: Countries included in this classification are engaged in substantial Internet censorship and surveillance. This includes countries where a number of categories are subject to a medium level of filtering or many categories are subject to a low level of filtering. A country is included in the "substantial" category when it:

- is not included in the "pervasive" category, and
  - is rated as "not free" in the Freedom on the Net (FOTN) report from Freedom House, or
  - is rated "partly free" or is not rated in FOTN, and
    - is included on the "Internet enemies" list from Reporters Without Borders, or
    - when the OpenNet Initiative categorizes the level of Internet filtering as pervasive or substantial in any of the four areas (political, social, conflict/security, and Internet tools) for which they test.

Selective censorship or surveillance: Countries included in this classification were found to practice selective Internet censorship and surveillance. This includes countries where a small number of specific sites are blocked or censorship targets a small number of categories or issues. A country is included in the "selective" category when it:

- is not included in the "pervasive" or "substantial" categories, and
  - is rated as "partly free" in the Freedom on the Net (FOTN) report from Freedom House, or
  - is included on the "Internet enemies" list from Reporters Without Borders, or
  - is not rated in FOTN and the OpenNet Initiative categorizes the level of Internet filtering as selective in any of the four areas (political, social, conflict/security, and Internet tools) for which they test.

Little or no censorship or surveillance: A country is included in the "little or no censorship or surveillance" category when it is not included in the "pervasive", "substantial" or "selective" categories.

This classification includes countries that are listed as "free" on the Freedom on the Net list from Freedom House, are not listed as "Enemies of the Internet" by Reporters Without Borders (RWB), and for which no evidence of Internet filtering was found by the OpenNet Initiative (ONI) in any of the four areas (political, social, conflict/security, and Internet tools) for which they test. Other controls such as voluntary filtering, self-censorship, and other types of public or private action to limit child pornography, hate speech, defamation, or theft of intellectual property often exist. The various nation sections, below, include ratings by ONI, RWB, etc.

== Pervasive censorship or surveillance ==
=== Belarus ===
- Rated "not free" by Freedom House in Freedom on the Net in 2011 (score 69), 2012 (score 69), 2013 (score 67), 2014 (score 62), 2015 (score 64), 2016 (score 62), 2017 (score 64), and 2018 (score 64).
- Listed as selective in the political, social, conflict/security and Internet tools areas by ONI in November 2010.
- Listed as an Internet enemy by RWB in 2012.

The Internet in Belarus, as a space used for circulating information and mobilizing protests, has been hard hit as the authorities increased the list of blocked websites and partially blocked the Internet during protests. As a way to limit coverage of demonstrations some Internet users and bloggers have been arrested and others have been invited to “preventive conversations” with the police. Law No. 317-3, which took effect on 6 January 2012, reinforced Internet surveillance and control measures.

The Belarus government has moved to second- and third-generation controls to manage its national information space. Control over the Internet is centralized with the government-owned Beltelecom managing the country's Internet gateway. Regulation is heavy with strong state involvement in the telecommunications and media market. Most users who post online media practice a degree of self-censorship prompted by fears of regulatory prosecution. The president has established a strong and elaborate information security policy and has declared his intention to exercise strict control over the Internet under the pretext of national security. The political climate is repressive and opposition leaders and independent journalists are frequently detained and prosecuted.

== Substantial censorship or surveillance ==
=== Russia ===
- Rated "partly free" by Freedom House in Freedom on the Net in 2009 (score 49), 2011 (score 52), 2012 (score 52), 2013 (score 54), and 2014 (score 60) and as "not free" in 2015 (score 62), 2016 (score 65), 2017 (score 66), and 2018 (score 67).
- Listed as selective in the political and social areas and as no evidence in conflict/security and Internet tools by ONI in December 2010.
- Listed as under surveillance by RWB from 2010 to 2013.
- Listed as an Internet Enemy by RWB in 2014.

The absence of overt state-mandated Internet filtering in Russia before 2012 had led some observers to conclude that the Russian Internet represents an open and uncontested space. In fact, the Russian government actively competes in Russian cyberspace employing second- and third-generation strategies as a means to shape the national information space and promote pro-government political messages and strategies. This approach is consistent with the government's strategic view of cyberspace that is articulated in strategies such as the doctrine of information security. The DoS attacks against Estonia (May 2007) and Georgia (August 2008) may be an indication of the government's active interest in mobilizing and shaping activities in Russian cyberspace.

In July 2012, the Russian State Duma passed the Bill 89417-6 which created a blacklist of Internet sites containing alleged child pornography, drug-related material, extremist material, and other content illegal in Russia. The Russian Internet blacklist was officially launched in November 2012, despite criticism by major websites and NGOs.

== Selective censorship or surveillance ==
=== Moldova ===
- Listed as selective in the political area and as no evidence in social, conflict/security, and Internet tools by ONI in December 2010.

While State authorities have interfered with mobile and Internet connections in an attempt to silence protestors and influence the results of elections, Internet users in Moldova enjoy largely unfettered access despite the government's restrictive and increasingly authoritarian tendencies. Evidence of second- and third-generation controls is mounting. Although filtering does not occur at the backbone level, the majority of filtering and surveillance takes place at the sites where most Moldovans access the Internet: Internet cafés and workplaces. Moldovan security forces have developed the capacity to monitor the Internet, and national legislation concerning illegal activities is strict.

=== Ukraine ===
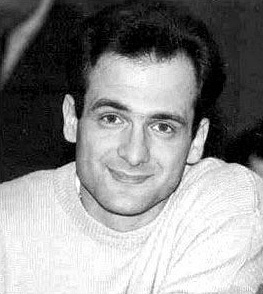
Georgiy Gongadze, Ukrainian journalist, founder of a popular Internet newspaper Ukrayinska Pravda, who was kidnapped and murdered in 2000.

- Rated "free" in the Freedom on the Net report by Freedom House in 2012 (score 27) and 2013 (score 28), and as "partly free" in 2014 (score 33), 2015 (score 37), 2016 (score 38), and 2017 (score 45).
- Listed as no evidence in all four areas (political, social, conflict/security, and Internet tools) by ONI in December 2010.

The Freedom on the Net 2013 report found the Internet in Ukraine to be "largely unhindered" with "no practice of institutionalized blocking or filtering, or a regulatory framework for censorship of content online", but that "there have been attempts at creating legislation which could censor or limit content" and would "present indirect threats to freedom of information online."

Ukraine possesses relatively liberal legislation governing the Internet and access to information. The Law on Protection of Public Morals of 20 November 2003, prohibits the production and circulation of pornography; dissemination of products that propagandize war or spread national and religious intolerance; humiliation or insult to an individual or nation on the grounds of nationality, religion, or ignorance; and the propagation of "drug addiction, toxicology, alcoholism, smoking and other bad habits."

The constitution and laws provide for freedom of speech and press. However, the government does not always respect these rights in practice. Local media observers express concern over high monetary damages that at times were demanded and awarded for alleged libel.

The constitution prohibits arbitrary interference with privacy, family, home, or correspondence, however, in practice authorities generally do not respect these prohibitions. Law enforcement bodies are known to monitor the Internet, at times without appropriate legal authority. There have been occasional agitations of interference by law enforcement agencies with prominent bloggers and online publications.

=== United Kingdom ===
- Rated "free" by Freedom House in Freedom on the Net in 2009 (score 23), 2011 (score 24), 2012 (score 23), 2013 (score 23), 2014 (score 24), 2015 (score 24), 2016 (score 23), and 2017 (score 24).
- Listed as an Internet Enemy by RWB in 2014.
- Listed as no evidence in all four areas (political, social, conflict/security, and Internet tools) by ONI in December 2010.

The United Kingdom has a notable libertarian tradition, manifested by, among other things, solid guarantees of freedom of expression, freedom of information, and protection of privacy. Freedom of expression and protection of privacy over the Internet is guaranteed by law. Nonetheless, over the last few years there has been a shift toward increased surveillance and police measures. Combating terrorism and preventing child abuse have been widely used as a justification by state agencies and private commercial actors (e.g., Internet service providers) for the implementation of interception and direct filtering measures. Nevertheless, in 2010 the OpenNet Initiative found no evidence of technical filtering in the political, social, conflict/security, or Internet tools areas. However, the UK openly blocks child pornography web sites, for which ONI does not test.

BT Group's ISP passes Internet traffic through a service called Cleanfeed which uses data provided by the Internet Watch Foundation to identify pages believed to contain indecent photographs of children. When such a page is found, the system creates a 'URL not found page' error rather than deliver the actual page or a warning page. Other ISPs use different systems such as WebMinder.

In July and again in October 2011, the English High Court ruled that British Telecom must block access to a website (newzbin.com) which "provides links to pirated movies". In September 2011, in response to the court ruling and with encouragement from government, leading UK ISPs are reported to have privately agreed in principle to quickly restrict access to websites when presented with court orders. In May 2012 the High Court ordered UK ISPs to block The Pirate Bay to prevent further copyright-infringing movie and music downloads from the website.

On 22 July 2013, Prime Minister David Cameron announced that by default pornography and other abusive material (such as suicide, alcohol and violence-related content) to most households in the UK would be filtered from the Internet by the end of 2013 unless a household chooses to receive it.

The UK has also announced plans requiring pornography sites worldwide to add age verification to prevent children from viewing them. UK based websites which fail to comply will be fined, while overseas sites will be blocked.

In June 2018 Tom Winsor, Her Majesty's Chief Inspector of Constabulary, said technologies like encryption should be breakable if law enforcers have a warrant. Winsor said the public was running out of patience with organisations like Facebook, Telegram and WhatsApp. Winsor said, “There is a handful of very large companies with a highly dominant influence over how the internet is used. In too many respects, their record is poor and their reputation tarnished. The steps they take to make sure their services cannot be abused by terrorists, paedophiles and organised criminals are inadequate; the commitment they show and their willingness to be held to account are questionable.”

== Little or no censorship or surveillance ==
=== Albania ===
There are no government restrictions on access to the Internet or reports that the government monitors e-mail or Internet chat rooms without appropriate legal authority. The constitution provides for freedom of speech and press, and the government generally respects these rights in practice. The constitution and the law prohibit arbitrary interference with privacy, family, home, or correspondence, and the government generally respects these prohibitions in practice.

=== Armenia ===
Censorship in Armenia is generally non-existent, while the online environment in remains relatively open. Since the 2018 Armenian Revolution, the government has made substantial progress in tackling systemic corruption.

=== Austria ===
- Austria is not individually classified in Freedom House's Freedom on the Net reports, or by ONI, and does not appear on the RWB lists.

The Austrian constitution provides for freedom of speech and press, and the government generally respects these rights in practice. There are no government restrictions on access to the Internet or credible reports that the government monitors e-mail or Internet chat rooms without appropriate legal authority. Individuals and groups engage in the peaceful expression of views via the Internet, including by e-mail. Authorities work to restrict access to Web sites containing information that violates the law, such as neo-Nazi and child pornography sites.

The law prohibits incitement, insult, or contempt against a group because of its members' race, nationality, or ethnicity if the statement violates human dignity and the government strictly enforces these laws. The law prohibits public denial, belittlement, approval, or justification of the Nazi genocide or other Nazi crimes against humanity in a print publication, a broadcast, or other media and the government strictly enforces these laws. Strict libel and slander laws discourage reporting of governmental abuse.

=== Belgium ===
- Not individually classified by ONI, but included in the regional overview for Europe.

Subject to warrants requested by the prosecutor several Belgian Internet providers including Belgacom, Telenet, Base, Scarlet, EDPnet, Dommel, Proximus, Mobistar, Mobile Vikings, Tele2, and Versatel have been filtering several websites at the DNS level since April 2009. This is done when the websites are engaged in illegal activities or when they display information that is "contrary to public order or morality". People who browse the Internet using one of these providers and hit a blocked website are redirected to a page that claims that the content of the website is illegal under Belgian law and therefore blocked.

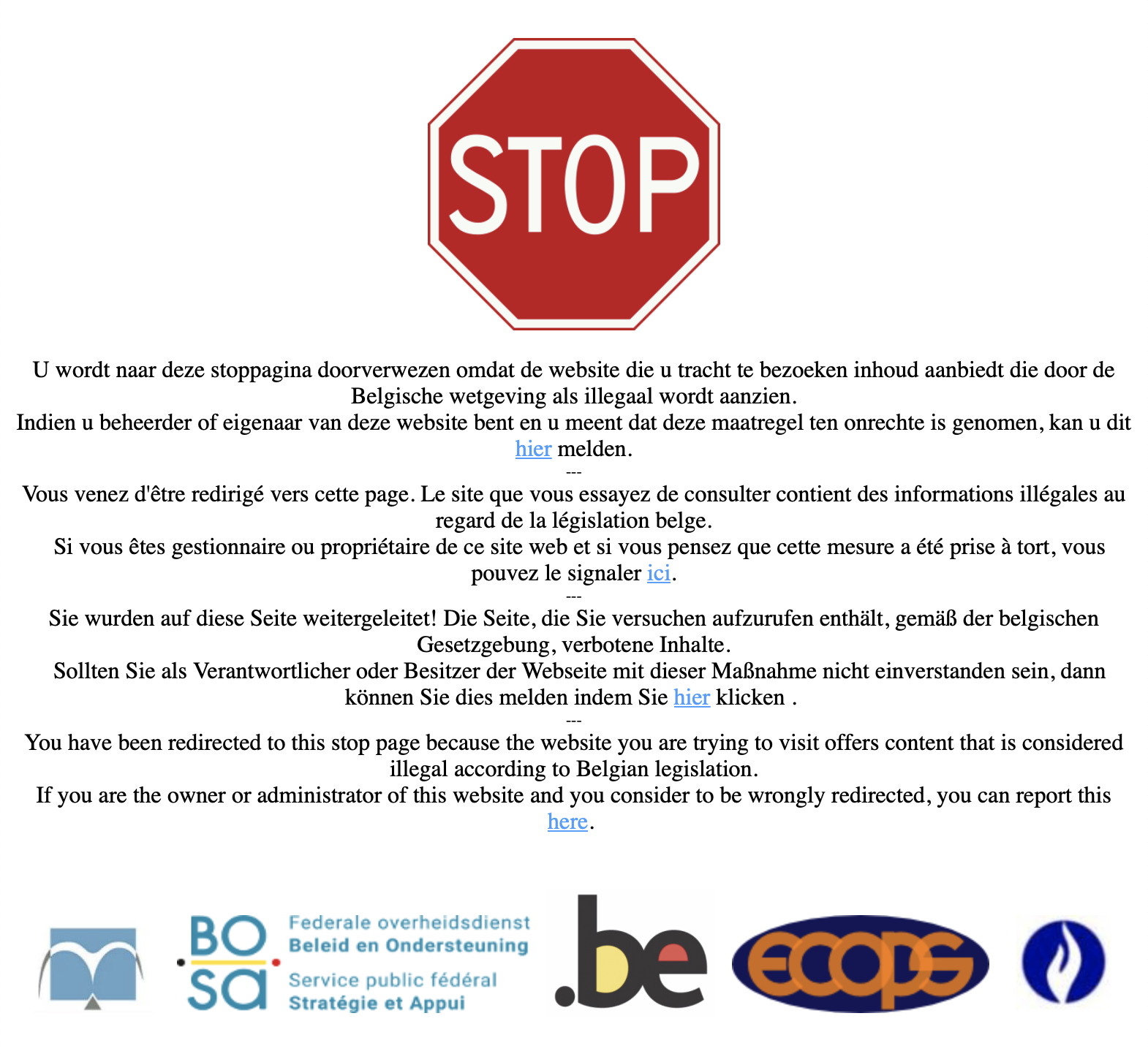
Landing page displayed upon attempting to access a censored website in Belgium.

The law mostly extends to "Unlicensed Gambling Sites", "Sites Promoting Hate, Bigotry and Anti-Semitism" and "File Sharing Sites".

=== Bosnia and Herzegovina ===
There are no government restrictions on access to the Internet or reports that the government monitors e-mail or Internet chat rooms.

The law provides for freedom of speech and press; however, the government does not always respect press freedom in practice. The Federation of Bosnia and Herzegovina law prohibits hate speech. The Republika Srpska law does not specifically proscribe hate speech, although the law prohibits causing ethnic, racial, or religious hatred. Independent analysts note a continuing tendency of politicians and other leaders to label unwanted criticism as hate speech. The law prohibits arbitrary interference with privacy, family, home, or correspondence, and the government generally respects these prohibitions in practice.

=== Bulgaria ===
There are no government restrictions on access to the Internet or reports that the government monitors e-mail or Internet chat rooms without appropriate legal authority.

The law provides for freedom of speech and press, and the government generally respects these rights. The penal code provides for from one to four years' imprisonment for incitement to "hate speech."

The constitution and law prohibit arbitrary interference with privacy, family, home, or correspondence, and the government generally respects these provisions in practice. The security services can access electronic data with judicial permission when investigating cyber and serious crimes. However, NGOs criticize gaps in the law that allow the prosecution service to request such data directly from the service providers without court authorization. There are no reports that the government attempts to collect personally identifiable information in connection with a person's peaceful expression of political, religious, or ideological opinions or beliefs.

=== Croatia ===
- No ONI country profile, but shown as no evidence in all areas (political, social, conflict/security, and Internet tools) on the ONI global Internet filtering maps.

The constitution and law generally provide for freedom of speech and the press; however, growing economic pressures lead journalists to practice self-censorship. Hate speech committed over the Internet is punishable by six months' to three years' imprisonment and libel is a criminal offense but the law is not enforced and social media, forums and reader's comment section on news portals are full of hate speech directed towards ethnic minorities and members of the LGBTQ community. There are no government restrictions on access to the Internet or reports the government monitors e-mail or Internet chat rooms. In general individuals and groups engage in the peaceful expression of views via the Internet, including by e-mail. Internet access is widely available and used by citizens throughout the country. An estimated 51% of the country's inhabitants used the Internet in 2010.

=== Czech Republic ===
- The Czech Republic is not individually classified in Freedom House's Freedom on the Net reports, or by ONI and does not appear on the RWB lists.

There were no government restrictions on access to the Internet or credible reports the government monitors e-mail or Internet chat rooms without judicial oversight. Individuals and groups engage in the free expression of views via the Internet, including by e-mail.

The law provides for freedom of speech and press, and the government generally respects these rights. However, the law provides for some exceptions to these freedoms, for example, in cases of "hate speech", Holocaust denial, and denial of Communist-era crimes. The law prohibits arbitrary interference with privacy, family, home, or correspondence, and the government generally respects these prohibitions in practice.

Several Internet providers and mobile operators in the Czech Republic block content promoting child pornography, child prostitution, child trafficking, pedophilia, illegal sexual contact with children, and racist materials based on URLs from the Internet Watch Foundation list and on individual direct requests made by customers.

On 25 February 2022, as a result of the 2022 Russian invasion of Ukraine, CZ.NIC decided to suspend 8 domains of conspiracy and fake news websites spreading Russian propaganda. On the same day, the cybernetic unit of the Czech military Intelligence has asked internet service providers to block access to 22 websites (including 8 domains above), while the blocking is voluntary. On 25 May 2022 CZ.NIC ended the suspension of 7 domains mentioned above, while 1 domain remained suspended, as it does not have the correct holder information listed in the registry.

=== Denmark ===
- No evidence of filtering found by ONI in 2009. There is no individual ONI country profile for Denmark, but it is included in the regional overview for the Nordic Countries.

Denmark's biggest Internet service provider TDC A/S launched a DNS-based child pornography filter on 18 October 2005 in cooperation with the state police department and Save the Children, a charity organisation. Since then, all major providers have joined and as of May 2006, 98% of the Danish Internet users were restricted by the filter. The filter caused some controversy in March 2006, when a legal sex site named Bizar.dk was caught in the filter, sparking discussion about the reliability, accuracy and credibility of the filter.

ONI found that Denmark's access to the Internet is "absolutely unrestricted". The constitution and law provide for freedom of speech and press and prohibit arbitrary interference with privacy, family, home, correspondence or friends. The government generally respects these rights in practice.

As of 18 October 2005, TDC A/S had blocked access to AllOfMP3.com, a popular MP3 download site, through DNS filtering.

On 4 February 2008 a Danish court ordered the Danish ISP Tele2 to shut down access to the file-sharing site thepiratebay.org for its Danish users.

On 23 December 2008, the list of 3,863 sites filtered in Denmark was released by WikiLeaks.

In November 2011 a site selling diet pills, 24hdiet.com, was blocked by Danish ISPs, the first use of a new law on the blocking of foreign websites that sell drugs.

In August 2012 Google removed ads from ticket website Viagogo after an investigation found that the site was violating Danish law by overcharging and manipulating tickets before sending them to the buyer.

=== Estonia ===
- Rated "free" in Freedom on the Net by Freedom House in 2009 (score 13), 2011 (score 10), 2012 (score 10), 2013 (score 9) 2014 (score 8), and 2015 (score 7).
- Not individually classified by ONI, but is included in the regional overview for the Commonwealth of Independent States.

Freedom of speech and freedom of expression are protected by Estonia's constitution and by the country's obligations as an EU member state. Anonymity is unrestricted, and there have been extensive public discussions on anonymity and the respectful use of the Internet. Work is underway to bring Estonian law into compliance with the European Council Framework on "combating certain forms and expressions of racism and xenophobia by means of criminal law".

Restrictions on Internet content and communications in Estonia are among the lightest in the world. Electronic communications companies are required to preserve traffic and location data for one year, as defined by the EU Data Retention Directive. They may only provide this data to surveillance agencies or security authorities when presented with a court order. A 2008 court case made web service providers responsible for reader comments, but that ruling is being appealed at the European Court of Human Rights. There have been instances of content removal involving civil court orders to remove inappropriate or off-topic reader comments from online news, discussion forums, and other sites. In 2012, over 80,000 videos were removed from YouTube and other streaming services for possible copyright infringement. The Personal Data Protection Act (PDPA) restricts the collection and public dissemination of an individual's personal data. No personal information that is considered sensitive—such as political opinions, religious or philosophical beliefs, ethnic or racial origin, sexual behavior, health, or criminal convictions—can be processed without the consent of the individual. Estonian law only considers distribution and sale of digital copies without royalties paid as illegal. Non-profit personal use is unregulated.

Prior to the blocking of remote gambling sites in 2010 the Internet in Estonia was free of censorship. Early in 2010 Estonia started DNS filtering of remote gambling sites that violate the renewed Gambling Act (2008). The Gambling Act requires that servers for legal remote gambling must be physically located in Estonia. In March 2010 the Tax and Customs Board had compiled a blocking list containing 175 sites which ISPs are to enforce. As of September 2013 the list had grown to include over 800 sites.

=== Finland ===
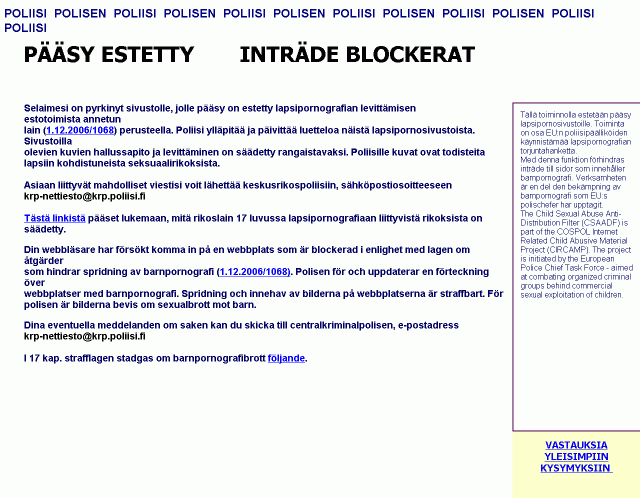
Lapsiporno.info block announcement as seen from the network maintained by ISP Welho

- Classified as no evidence of filtering in all areas by ONI in 2009. There is no individual ONI country profile for Finland, but it is included in the regional overview for the Nordic Countries.

In 2006, a new copyright law known as Lex Karpela set some restrictions on publishing information regarding copy protection schemes.

Also in 2006 the government started Internet censorship by delivering Finnish ISPs a secret blocking list maintained by Finnish police. Implementation of the block was voluntary, but some ISPs implemented it. The list was supposed to contain only sites with child pornography, but ended up also blocking, among others, the site lapsiporno.info that criticized the move towards censorship and listed sites that were noticed to have been blocked.

In 2008 a government-sponsored report has considered establishing similar filtering in order to curb online gambling.

In 2012 Internet service providers Elisa, Sonera and DNA have been ordered by court to block traffic to The Pirate Bay.

=== France ===
- Rated "free" in Freedom on the Net by Freedom House in 2013 (score 20), 2014 (score 20), and 2015 (score 24).
- Listed as no evidence in the political, social, conflict/security, and Internet tools areas by ONI in November 2010.
- Listed as Under Surveillance by RWB from 2011 to the present.

France continues to promote freedom of the press and speech online by allowing unfiltered access to most content, apart from limited filtering of child pornography and web sites that promote terrorism, or racial violence and hatred. The French government has undertaken numerous measures to protect the rights of Internet users, including the passage of the Loi pour la Confiance dans l'Économie Numérique (LCEN, Law for Trust in the Digital Economy) in 2004. However, the passage of a new copyright law threatening to ban users from the Internet upon their third violation has drawn much criticism from privacy advocates as well as the European Union (EU) parliament.

With the implementation of the "three-strikes" legislation and a law providing for the administrative filtering of the web and the defense of a "civilized" Internet, 2010 was a difficult year for Internet freedom in France. The offices of several online media firms and their journalists were targeted for break-ins and court summons and pressured to identify their sources. As a result, France has been added to the Reporters Without Borders list of "Countries Under Surveillance".

A June 2011 draft executive order implementing Article 18 of the Law for Trust in the Digital Economy (LCEN) would give several French government ministries the power to restrict online content “in case of violation, or where there is a serious risk of violation, of the maintenance of public order, the protection of minors, the protection of public health, the preservation of interests of the national defense, or the protection of physical persons.” According to Félix Tréguer, a Policy and Legal Analyst for the digital rights advocacy group La Quadrature du Net, this is "a censorship power over the Internet that is probably unrivaled in the democratic world." In response to criticism, on 23 June 2011 the minister for the Industry and the Digital economy, Éric Besson, announced that the Government would rewrite the order, possibly calling for a judge to review the legality of the content and the proportionality of the measures to be taken. Any executive order has to be approved by the French Council of State, which will have to decide whether Internet censorship authorization can be extended to such an extent by a mere executive order. It has also been suggested that, because e-commerce legislation is to be harmonized within the European Union, the draft should be reviewed by the European Commission.

=== Germany ===
- Rated "free" in Freedom on the Net by Freedom House in 2011 (score 16), 2012 (score 15), 2013 (score 17), 2014 (score 17), and 2015 (score 18).
- Listed as no evidence in all four areas (political, social, conflict/security, and Internet tools) by ONI in December 2010.

Internet censorship in Germany is practiced by law as well as the effect of some court decisions. An example of content censored by law is the removal of web sites from Google search results that deny the holocaust, which is a felony under German law.

In Germany, occasional take down requests and access restrictions are imposed on German ISPs, usually to protect minors or to suppress hate speech and extremism. In April 2009, the German government signed a bill that would implement large-scale filtering of child pornography websites, with the possibility for later expansion. However, that law was repealed in 2011 since Internet service providers quickly take down child pornography after they receive knowledge about it, a fact that had already been pointed out by Internet freedom organisations and political parties such as the Freie Demokratische Partei and the Piratenpartei before the law came into effect.

While censorship is not widespread and the constitution and law guarantee speech and press freedom, there are laws that allow blocking of offensive sites or media on websites unwilling to pay licensing fees. A well known example is the GEMA-YouTube dispute.

While file-sharing sites are mostly accessible, access to the sites is often discreetly enforced, and could lead to the user paying a €1000 fine for copyright infringement.

Effective 2018 Germany started enforcing the Netzwerkdurchsetzungsgesetz (NetzDG), a law that demands social media sites move quickly to remove "hate speech", "fake news" and "illegal material". Sites that do not remove "obviously illegal" posts could face fines of up to €50 million. The law gives the networks 24 hours to act after they have been told about law-breaking material. Critics argue the short timeframes coupled with the potentially large fines will lead social networks to be overly cautious and delete huge amounts of content — even things that are perfectly legal. An earlier draft of the NetzDG bill barred "defamation of the President of the Federation", but the clause was removed after criticism.

=== Greece ===
There are no government restrictions on access to the Internet or reports that the government monitors e-mail or Internet chat rooms without appropriate legal authority.

The constitution provides for freedom of speech and press, and the government generally respects these rights in practice. The law provides for prosecution of individuals who "intentionally incite others to actions that could provoke discrimination, hatred, or violence against persons or groups of persons on the basis of their race or ethnic origin or who express ideas insulting to persons or to groups of persons because of their race or ethnic origin." In practice the government has never invoked these provisions. The law provides criminal penalties for defamation, however, in most criminal defamation cases, authorities released defendants on bail pending trial and they served no time in jail. The constitution and law prohibit arbitrary interference with privacy, family, home, or correspondence. However, NGOs such as the Greek Helsinki Monitor report that authorities do not always respect these provisions in practice.

On 29 June 2009, Georgios Sanidas, the soon-to-be-retired Prosecutor of the Greek Supreme Court (Areios Pagos), declared that "Internet-based communications are not covered by current privacy laws" and are thus open to surveillance by the police. Such surveillance would be, according to Sanidas's mandate, completely legal. Following this proclamation, Greek bloggers, legal experts and notable personalities from the media have claimed that Sanidas's mandate contravenes both the Greek constitution and current EU laws regarding the privacy of Internet communications. Furthermore, this mandate has been greatly criticised as being a first step towards full censorship of all Internet content.

=== Greenland ===
As a territory of the Kingdom of Denmark, Greenland has a democratically elected home-rule government whose powers may encompass all matters except foreign and national security affairs, police services, and monetary matters. Greenlanders have the same rights throughout the kingdom as other citizens.

The Danish government places no restrictions on access to the Internet and there are no credible reports that e-mail or Internet chat rooms are monitored without appropriate legal authority. Authorities continue to employ an Internet filter designed to block child pornography. In no known cases did the filter affect legitimate sites. The Danish Constitution provides for freedom of speech and press with some limitations such as cases involving child pornography, libel, blasphemy, hate speech, and racism, and the government generally respects these rights in practice.

In April 2013, the registrar for the .gl domain unilaterally voluntarily suspended resolution of thepiratebay.gl, intended to be a new primary Domain Name for the famous Bittorrent search engine The Pirate Bay. This caused transient inconvenience to some file sharing Internet users.

=== Hungary ===
- Rated "free" in Freedom on the Net by Freedom House in 2012 (score 19), 2013 (score 23), 2014 (score 24), and 2015 (score 24).
- No ONI country profile, but shown as no evidence in all areas (political, social, conflict/security, and Internet tools) on the ONI global Internet filtering maps.

There are no government restrictions on access to the Internet or reports that the government monitors e-mail or Internet chat rooms. Individuals and groups engage in the peaceful expression of views via the Internet, including by e-mail.

The constitution and law provide for freedom of speech and of the press, and the government generally respects these rights in practice. The constitution and law prohibit arbitrary interference with privacy, family, home, or correspondence, and the government generally respects these prohibitions in practice.

=== Iceland ===
- Not individually classified by ONI, but included in the regional overview for the Nordic Countries.

Censorship is prohibited by the Icelandic Constitution and there is a strong tradition of protecting freedom of expression that extends to the use of the Internet. However, questions about how best to protect children, fight terrorism, prevent libel, and protect the rights of copyright holders are ongoing in Iceland as they are in much of the world.

The five Nordic countries—Denmark, Finland, Norway, Sweden, and Iceland—are central players in the European battle between file sharers, rights holders, and Internet service providers (ISPs). While each country determines its own destiny, the presence of the European Union (EU) is felt in all legal controversies and court cases. Iceland, while not a member of the EU, is part of the European Economic Area (EEA) and has agreed to enact legislation similar to that passed in the EU in areas such as consumer protection and business law.

Internet service providers in Iceland use filters to block Web sites distributing child pornography. Iceland's ISPs in cooperation with Barnaheill—Save the Children Iceland participate in the International Association of Internet Hotlines (INHOPE) project. Suspicious links are reported by organizations and the general public and passed on to relevant authorities for verification.

In 2012 and 2013 Ögmundur Jónasson, Minister of Interior, proposed two bills to the Icelandic parliament that would limit Icelander's access to the Internet. The first proposed limitations on gambling and the second on pornography. Neither bill was passed by parliament and a new government has since been formed following the parliamentary election held on 27 April 2013.

=== Ireland ===
- Not individually classified by ONI.

Internet censorship in Ireland is a controversial issue with the introduction of a graduated response policy in 2008 followed by an effort to block certain file sharing sites starting in February 2009. Grassroots campaigns including "Blackout Ireland" and "Boycott Eircom" have been established to protest the censorship.

Beyond these issues there are no government restrictions on access to the Internet or credible reports that the government monitored e-mail or Internet chat rooms. Individuals and groups could engage in the expression of views via the Internet, including by e-mail. Irish law provides for freedom of speech including for members of the press, and the government generally respects these rights in practice. An independent press, an effective judiciary, and a functioning democratic political system act jointly to ensure freedom of speech and of the press.

Currently, Eircom is using the "three-strikes" program for users who are attempting to access the blocked sites and is still met with a lot of backlash.

=== Italy ===
- Rated "free" by Freedom House in Freedom on the Net in 2011 (score 26), 2012 (score 23), 2013 (score 23), 2014 (score 22), and 2015 (score 23).
- Listed as selective in the social area and as no evidence in political, conflict/security, and Internet tools by ONI in December 2010.

Internet filtering in Italy is applied against child pornography, gambling, and some P2P web-sites. The Pirate Bay website and IP address are unreachable from Italy, blocked directly by Internet service providers. A controversial verdict issued by the Court of Bergamo and later confirmed by the Supreme Court, allowed the blocking, stating that it was useful in order to prevent copyright infringement. Pervasive filtering is applied to gambling websites that do not have a local license to operate in Italy. An anti-terrorism law, amended in 2005 by then-Minister of the Interior Giuseppe Pisanu after the terrorists attacks in Madrid and London, restricts the opening of new Wi-Fi Hotspots. In August 2013 restrictions on Wi-Fi access were largely removed by the Decreto Fare decree.

=== Latvia ===
- No ONI country profile, but shown as no evidence in all areas (political, social, conflict/security, and Internet tools) on the ONI global Internet filtering maps.

The constitution and law provide for freedom of speech and of the press. There are no government restrictions on access to the Internet or reports that the government monitors e-mail or Internet chat rooms. Individuals and groups engage in the peaceful expression of views via the Internet, including by e-mail. According to International Telecommunication Union statistics for 2009, approximately 67 percent of the country's inhabitants used the Internet.

In September 2010 the government's Corruption Prevention and Combating Bureau (KNAB), which enforces campaign laws, removed a satirical film, The Last Bear Slayer, from the on-demand playlist of the partially state-owned cable provider, Lattelecom. The KNAB stated that the film might have constituted election advertising. Reporters Without Borders charged that the prohibition constituted improper censorship, but noted it was ineffective because the film was widely available on the Internet.

On June 1, 2014, new subsection 22 of section 19 of Electronic Communications Law was enforced to enable blocking unlicensed gambling websites. Since then LOTTERIES AND GAMBLING SUPERVISORY INSPECTION OF LATVIA maintains the list of blocked websites

=== Lithuania ===
There are no government restrictions on access to the Internet or credible reports that the government monitors e-mail or Internet chat rooms without appropriate legal authority. Individuals and groups generally engage in the free expression of views via the Internet, including by e-mail, but authorities prosecute people for openly posting material on the Internet that authorities considered to be inciting hatred.

The constitution provides for freedom of speech and press, and the government generally respects these rights in practice. However, the constitutional definition of freedom of expression does not protect certain acts, such as incitement to national, racial, religious, or social hatred, violence and discrimination, or slander, and disinformation. It is a crime to disseminate information that is both untrue and damaging to an individual's honor and dignity. Libel is punishable by a fine or imprisonment of up to one year, or up to two years for libelous material disseminated through the mass media. While it is illegal to publish material "detrimental to minors' bodies" or thought processes, information promoting the sexual abuse and harassment of minors, promoting sexual relations among minors, or "sexual relations", the law is not often invoked and there are no indications that it adversely affects freedom of the media.

=== Montenegro ===
There are no government restrictions on access to the Internet. Until ordered to cease doing so in March 2011, one of the country's principal Internet service providers gave police direct access to all forms of communications carried on its servers. It is unknown whether authorities made use of this access to monitor e-mail or Internet Web sites or chat rooms. There is no evidence that the government collects or discloses personally identifiable information about individuals based on the individual's peaceful expression of political, religious, or ideological opinion or belief.

The constitution and law provide for freedom of speech and press, but there are some restrictions. The law criminalizes inciting hatred and intolerance on national, racial, and religious grounds, and there have been prosecutions on these grounds.

The constitution and law prohibit arbitrary interference with privacy, family, home, or correspondence without court approval or legal necessity, and prohibit police from searching a residence or conducting undercover or monitoring operations without a warrant. The Agency for National Security (ANB), however, reportedly uses wiretapping and surveillance inappropriately against opposition parties, the international community, NGOs, and other groups without appropriate legal authority. NGOs claimed that police and the state prosecutor's office illegally monitor citizens' electronic communications and fail to account for how many people or Internet addresses they monitor.

=== Netherlands ===
- Not individually classified by ONI.

Government-mandated Internet censorship is nonexistent due to the house of representatives speaking out against filtering on multiple occasions, although there have been proposals to filter child pornography.

In 2008 the Minister of Justice proposed a plan to block websites known to contain child pornography. A blacklist created by the Meldpunt ter bestrijding van Kinderpornografie op Internet (Hotline combating Child Pornography on the Internet) would have been used by Internet service providers to redirect the websites to a stop page. In 2011 the plan was withdrawn due to an "almost complete lack of websites to block" because the sharing of the material was no longer done by conventional websites, but by other services. The House of Representatives reaffirmed this by voting against the filter later that year, effectively killing any plans for government censorship.

In January 2012, the Internet service providers Ziggo and XS4all were required by a court order in a case brought by the Bescherming Rechten Entertainment Industrie Nederland (BREIN) to block the website of The Pirate Bay due to copyright infringement. This blocking raised questions within the government, customers, and the Internet providers themselves, not only because of the blocking, but also about its randomness and the role of BREIN, an industry trade association that can change the blacklist.

This law was dropped in January 2014 following a referendum by the ministry with a new law stating that file sharing for private use is allowed while commercial distribution is forbidden.

In 2020 the Supreme Court affirmed the decision of ordering ISPs to block access to the IP-addresses and URLs of The Pirate Bay.

In 2021, a group of ISPs including KPN, Ziggo and T-Mobile signed a binding agreement to block sites that any of these ISPs were ordered to block by a court of justice for infringing on copyright. Similar agreements exist in Germany and Denmark.

=== North Macedonia ===
There are no government restrictions on access to the Internet or credible reports that the government monitors e-mail or Internet chat rooms without judicial oversight.

The constitution provides for freedom of speech and press; however, the government does not always respect these rights in practice. The law prohibits speech that incites national, religious, or ethnic hatred, and provides penalties for violations. The law prohibits arbitrary interference with privacy, family, home, or correspondence, and the government generally respects these prohibitions in practice.

=== Norway ===
- Classified as no evidence of filtering by ONI in 2009. There is no individual ONI country profile for Norway, but it is included in the regional overview for the Nordic Countries.

Norway prohibits "hate speech", and defines it as publicly making statements that threaten or ridicule someone or that incite hatred, persecution or contempt for someone due to their race, ethnic origin, sexual orientation, religion or philosophy of life. A public Free Speech committee (1996–1999) recommended to abolish the hate speech law but the Norwegian Parliament instead voted to expand it.

Norway's major Internet service providers have a DNS filter which blocks access to sites authorities claim are known to provide child pornography, similar to Denmark's filter. A list claimed to be the Norwegian DNS blacklist was published at WikiLeaks in March 2009. The minister of justice, Knut Storberget, sent a letter threatening ISPs with a law compelling them to use the filter should they refuse to do so voluntarily (dated 29 August 2008). Since September 2015 Norway's largest ISPs also block The Pirate Bay and other similar services.

=== Poland ===
- Not individually classified by ONI, but included in the regional overview for Europe.

Internet censorship legislation that included the creation of a register of blocked web sites was abandoned by the Polish Government in early 2011, following protests and petitions opposing the proposal. Moderate moderation of content on Polish language services and Polish language social media.

They are blocked all websites offering gambling games, that are not owned by the Totalizator Sportowy belonging to the Polish State Treasury and supervised by Ministry of State Assets, and sites selling illegal "items" (for example, boosters) and parties recognized as a threat to state security.

Some Russian sites have been blocked due to the ongoing Russian invasion of Ukraine.

=== Portugal ===
- Portugal is not individually classified by ONI or in Freedom House's Freedom on the Net 2013 report, and does not appear on the RWB lists.

Internet access in Portugal is not restricted. There are neither government restrictions on access to the Internet nor reports that the government monitors e-mail or Internet chat rooms without appropriate legal authority. The constitution and law provide for freedom of speech and press, and the government generally respects these rights in practice. The law criminalizes the denigration of ethnic or religious minorities and the engagement in offensive practices such as Holocaust denial. Prison sentences for these crimes run between six months to eight years.

In March 2015, Portuguese ISP's were ordered to block The Pirate Bay and many of its proxies by a court order, following the European trend, after a lawsuit brought by the Association for Copyright Management, Producers and Publishers (GEDIPE). This is the first time websites were blocked by ISP's in Portugal.

Since July 2015 MAPiNET, the Civic Movement to Combat Piracy on the Internet, has blocked hundreds of websites for copyright infringement.

=== Romania ===
- Classified by ONI as no evidence of filtering in 2009. There is no individual ONI country profile for Romania, but it is included in the regional overview for Europe.

Internet censorship in Romania is mainly related to the filtering of sites with pornographic content hosted in Romania and the protection of children. Although proposals have been made to censor pornographic sites, so far no sites have been blocked with the exception of a few unlicensed casino-like websites.

=== Serbia ===
There are no government restrictions on access to the Internet, e-mail, or Internet chat rooms. Most observers believe authorities selectively monitor communications, eavesdrop on conversations, and read mail and e-mail. Human rights leaders also believe that authorities monitor their communications.

The constitution and law provides for freedom of speech and press. However, the constitution specifically allows restrictions on speech "to protect the rights and reputation of others, to uphold the authority and objectivity of the courts and to protect public health, morals of a democratic society and national security of the Republic of Serbia." While the law does not include a specific provision on hate speech, it is a criminal offense to "incite" national, racial, or religious intolerance. In June 2011 the Constitutional Court banned the extreme right-wing organization Nacionalni Stroj (National Front) for promoting racist hate speech.

The law obliges telecommunications operators to retain for one year data on the source and destination of a communication; the beginning, duration, and end of a communication; the type of communication; terminal equipment identification; and the location of the customer's mobile terminal equipment. While these data can be accessed by intelligence agencies without court permission, a court order is required to access the contents of these communications.

=== Slovakia ===
- Slovakia is not individually classified by ONI or in Freedom House's Freedom on the Net 2013 report, and does not appear on the RWB lists.

There are no government restrictions on access to the Internet or reports that the government monitors e-mail or Internet chat rooms without judicial oversight; however, police monitor Web sites containing hate speech and attempt to arrest or fine the authors.

The constitution and the law provide for freedom of speech and press. While the government mostly respects these rights in practice, in some instances, it limits these rights to impede criticism and limits actions of groups it considers extremist. The law prohibits the defamation of nationalities, punishable by up to three years in prison, and denial of the Holocaust, which carries a sentence of six months to three years in prison. Criminal penalties for defamation are rarely used. The constitution and the law prohibit arbitrary interference with privacy, family, home, or correspondence and the government generally respects these prohibitions in practice. Police must present a warrant before conducting a search or within 24 hours afterwards.

A new draft law under consideration in 2011 would allow the nation's tax office to block web servers that provide online gambling without a Slovak license. Opponents argue that the economic interests served by the law are not sufficient to justify online censorship.

=== Slovenia ===
- Slovenia is not individually classified by ONI or in Freedom House's Freedom on the Net 2013 report, and does not appear on the RWB lists.

There are no government restrictions on access to the Internet or credible reports that the government monitors e-mail or Internet chat rooms without appropriate legal authority. The constitution and law provide for freedom of speech and press, and the government generally respects these rights. However, the law prohibits hate speech, including incitement to intolerance as well as violence. The law provides criminal penalties for defamation that harms a person's honor or name. Under the law Internet service providers are responsible for blocking access to Internet gambling web sites that are not licensed by the Slovenian government.

=== Spain ===
- Spain is not individually classified by ONI or in Freedom House's Freedom on the Net 2013 report, and does not appear on the RWB lists.

There are no government restrictions on access to the Internet or reports that the government monitors e-mail or Internet chat rooms without appropriate legal authority.

The constitution provides for freedom of speech and press, and the government generally respects these rights. The law prohibits, subject to judicial oversight, actions including public speeches and the publication of documents that the government interprets as glorifying or supporting terrorism. The law provides that persons who provoke discrimination, hatred, or violence against groups or associations for racist; anti-semitic; or other references to ideology, religion or belief, family status, membership within an ethnic group or race, national origin, sex, sexual orientation, illness, or disability may be punished with imprisonment for one to three years.

Since January 2015, Vodafone Spain blocks thepiratebay.org as requested by the Ministry of Interior. And since 29 March 2015 thepiratebay is blocked on multiple URLs from all ISPs.

In September 2017, a judge ordered to close or block all websites organising the Catalan independence referendum, including the whole subdomain gateway.ipfs.io from the InterPlanetary File System. The vote was previously declared as illegal by the Spanish constitutional court.

As of December 2017, all previously blocked sites have once again been unblocked, with the focus shifting to taking the sites down directly.

On 22 March 2024, Audiencia Nacional's judge Santiago Pedraz issued a court order requesting Spanish ISPs to block access to Telegram during the course of an investigation about copyrighted content being distributed by the platform. Media companies, including Atresmedia, EGEDA, Mediaset, and Telefonica, complained that Telegram was allowing users to upload their content without permission.

=== Sweden ===
- Classified by ONI as no evidence of filtering in 2009. There is no individual ONI country profile for Sweden, but it is included in the regional overview for the Nordic Countries.

There are no government restrictions on access to the Internet or credible reports that the government monitors e-mail or Internet chat rooms without appropriate legal authority. The constitution provides for freedom of speech and the press, and the government generally respects these rights in practice. The law criminalizes expression considered to be hate speech.

Sweden's major Internet service providers have a DNS filter which blocks access to sites authorities claim are known to provide child pornography. The Swedish police are responsible for updating this list.

The constitution and law prohibit arbitrary interference with privacy, family, home, or correspondence, and the government generally respects these prohibitions in practice. The law permits the signals intelligence agency, National Defense Radio Establishment, to monitor the content of all cross-border cable-based Internet traffic to combat "external threats" such as terrorism and organized crime. Monitoring is only possible after obtaining court permission and upon the explicit request of government or defense agencies. In 2012 parliament passed the EU Data Retention Directive that compels Internet service providers to store data on online communications within the country for six months so that law enforcement agencies have access to it if a court so orders.

On 9 December 2014 The Pirate Bay (TPB) was raided at the Nacka station, a nuclear-proof data center built into a mountain complex near Stockholm. Despite the rise of various TPB clones and rumors of reincarnations, thepiratebay.se domain remained inaccessible. On 13 December 2014 Isohunt created a site called The Old Pirate Bay, which appears to be a resurrection of thepiratebay. On 21 December 2014 after nearly two weeks of downtime the official domain of The Pirate Bay showed signs of life. ThePirateBay.se was only waving a pirate flag, but that's enough to give many Pirate Bay users hope for a full recovery. A few minutes later came another big change when The Pirate Bay's main domain started pointing to a new IP-address connected to a server hosted in Moldova.

On 13 February 2017 Sweden's Patent and Market Court of Appeal decided that a broadband provider must block its customers from accessing file sharing site The Pirate Bay, overruling a district court ruling to the contrary from 2015. This is the first time a website was openly blocked in Sweden. The rest of the ISPs are expected to follow the same court orders.

=== Switzerland ===
- Switzerland is not individually classified by ONI or in Freedom House's Freedom on the Net 2013 report, and does not appear on the RWB lists.

There were no government restrictions on access to the Internet or credible reports that the government monitored e-mail or Internet chat rooms without appropriate legal authority. The constitution provides for freedom of speech and press, and the government generally respects these rights in practice. The law penalizes public incitement to racial hatred or discrimination, spreading racist ideology, and denying crimes against humanity and it is a crime to publish information based on leaked “secret official discussions.”

In November 2011 the Swiss government ruled that downloading infringing copies of films, music and video games for personal use will remain legal, because it is not detrimental to copyright owners.

In 2010 the Federal Supreme Court of Switzerland found that IP addresses are personal information and that under Swiss privacy laws they may not be used to track Internet usage without the knowledge of the individuals involved.

== See also ==
- Internet censorship and surveillance in Africa
- Internet censorship and surveillance in Asia
- Internet censorship and surveillance in Oceania
- Internet censorship and surveillance in the Americas
