= Censorship in Finland =

Censorship in Finland refers to government policies in controlling and regulating certain information.

== History ==
In 1686, the office of Censor of Books, which was to monitor literature imported and published in Finland, was established. Publishers had to get approval for their books.

In the 19th century, the censors attacked the press. Several newspapers were stopped soon after they came out.

In 1829, a law was implemented, heavily increasing censorship, being in place until 1865. A committee was made to take care of it, the president being the deputy chancellor of the university.

=== Locations ===
During World War I, Russian censorship was carried out in the following cities: Helsinki, Tornio, Kuopio, Vaasa, Pori, Tampere, Turku, Rauma, Oulu and Viipuri.

At the end of 19th century during the attempt of Russification in Finland, several Finnish newspapers were taken out of print.

During the Second World War, a government agency was founded to administer censorship.

=== After the Second World War ===
In the immediate aftermath of the Continuation War, a number of books were withdrawn from public libraries because of Soviet pressure. This ban concerned mostly pre-war and wartime propaganda works which were considered anti-Soviet, but the books remained in free circulation in the second-hand market. In 1958, the memoirs Kommunisti sisäministerinä (“Communist as the Minister of Interior”) of former communist Minister of Interior Affairs Yrjö Leino were withdrawn from circulation and burned just before publication on Soviet demand. The book was republished in 1991.

During the period of Finlandization, major Finnish publishers tended to avoid books that were thought to risk Soviet displeasure. For example, the first volume of the Finnish translation of Aleksander Solzhenitsyn’s The Gulag Archipelago was published in Sweden, and the remaining two volumes by a minor Finnish publisher.

== Modern day ==
=== Film ===
Film censorship carried out by the government agency Finnish Board of Film Classification was abolished in 2001. However, the agency still rates all movies sold in Finland.

==== Banned films ====
| Date | Title | Notes |
|---|---|---|
| 1930–1952 | Battleship Potemkin | Banned out of fear of inciting a Communist revolution. |
| 1943–1945 | Mrs. Miniver | Banned during World War II. |
| 1943–1950 | Johnny Eager | Banned during World War II and finally released on March 31, 1950. |
| 1955–1959 | Rififi | Banned for its depiction of cracking security safes. The government feared it might inspire copycat crimes. The ban was lifted after five years. |
| 1960–1981 | Peeping Tom | Banned for 21 years. |
| 1962–1986 | One, Two, Three | Banned for 24 years due to its political satire, which could offend their ally and neighbouring country, the Soviet Union. (Finland had a policy of Finlandization). |
| 1969–1989 | The Great Silence | Banned by the Finnish Board of Film in June 1969 for violence. Ban was lifted in February 1989 after several minutes of cuts. The film was still rated as K18 (suitable for adults only) and as such VHS versions of the film were also not allowed. The film has never received a proper premier in Finland although it has been aired three times in television (1994, 1999 and 2009). |
| 1971–2000 | The Devils | Banned on its initial release in 1971 for violence and content which could potentially be hazardous to mental health. The decision to ban was ultimately taken to highest available court which did not lift the ban. A second round of banning was then seen in 1985 and the government officials used the same exact phrasing in their decision to ban as was done 14 years earlier. The ban was finally automatically lifted after a law change in 2001. |
| 1972 | One Day in the Life of Ivan Denisovich | Banned by the Finnish Board of Film. In 1972 and 1974 Swedish television showed the film, resulting in the Swedish television mast on Åland being shut down during the film because Finns were banned from seeing the film. Director of the Finnish Board of Film, Jerker Eriksson, said that the banning of the film was political because it harmed the Finnish-Soviet relationship. Finnish television showed the film in 1996 on the TV1 YLE channel. |
| 1972 | Dirty Harry | Banned in February 1972 for violence and mental health reasons. The distributor challenged the banning and took the decision to ban to Finnish Supreme administrative Court which ruled against banning. After minor cuts, it was banned again. A second round of court cases (again, won by the distributor) forced the banning authorities to allow the film to be distributed. They did so but only after mandatory cuts of over three minutes. Finally in January 1973 the cut film premiered in Finland. |
| 1974–1996 | The Texas Chain Saw Massacre | Banned because of graphic violence. |
| 1976 | Ultime grida dalla savana | This film is entirely banned for the possible inclusion of scenes of genuine human death. |
| 1976–2000 | Salò o le 120 giornate di Sodoma | Banned in 1976 for moral, mental health and appropriateness reasons. The banning renewed again in 1984 with the defined exception of two specific screenings by the Finnish Film Archive. Finally a law change in 2001 removed the ban. |
| 1980 | Cruising | Banned on its initial release. |
| 1980–2000 | All Friday the 13th films | Banned on each films' initial release until a law change in 2001 when all films in the franchise automatically reverted to a K18 (adults only) classification. |
| 1981–1991 | Dead & Buried | Banned on its initial release. A considerably shortened version was allowed in 1991 with a K16 classification (allowed for persons over the age of 16). |
| 1982 | Just Before Dawn | Banned for violence for 4 months until a cut version (around 2 minutes of cuts) was allowed with a classification of K18 (adults only). |
| 1986 | Born American | Banned in January 1986 for its violence and for political reasons. The political reasons were that the film was "potentially harmful to international relations". A court appeal to Finnish Supreme administrative Court decided against the banning (after some cuts would be made) and authorities were forced to dismantle the ban (with more cuts) and the film premiered in late December 1986 after a struggle of almost a year. 20 years after the film was banned, it was revealed (by a politics researcher and academic Juhani Suomi in his book "Kohti sinipunaa") that the authorities were in fact "instructed" to ban the film and that the banning was dictated by the Soviet Union's ambassador Vladimir Sobolev. Born American was the last film in Finland to suffer banning for political reasons. |
| 1986–2000 | The House on the Edge of the Park | Banned for violence in 1986; it took six years after the film's release for any distributor to even try to get a classification. A law change in 2001 finally lifted the ban. |
| 1988–2003 | Child's Play | Banned due to excessive graphic violence. |

=== Internet ===
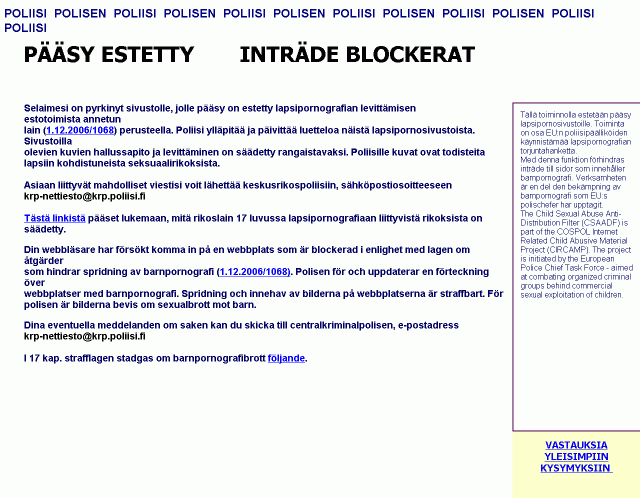
Lapsiporno.info block announcement as seen from the network maintained by ISP Welho

In 2006, a new copyright law known as Lex Karpela set some restrictions on publishing information regarding copy protection schemes.

Also in 2006, the government started Internet censorship by delivering Finnish ISPs a secret blocking list maintained by Finnish police. Implementation of the block was voluntary, but some ISPs implemented it. The list was supposed to contain only sites with child pornography, but ended up also blocking, among others, the site lapsiporno.info that criticized the move towards censorship and listed sites that were noticed to have been blocked.

Following a “voluntary law” enacted by Finnish parliament on 1 January 2007, most of the Finland's major Internet service providers decided on 22 November 2006 to begin filtering child pornography, and ISPs first started filtering in January 2008. The Ministry of Communications has commented that filtering is voluntary for ISPs as long as they do not refuse. The blacklist is provided by Finnish police and should contain only foreign sites. Technically filtering was planned to be URI based, like the United Kingdom’s Cleanfeed, but so far implementations have been DNS based.

A majority of these censored Internet sites, however, do not actually seem to be censored by the Finnish ISPs due to actual child pornography, but due to “normal” adult pornography instead. Most of the known sites are also located in EU or United States where child pornography is strictly illegal anyway. Two-thirds of the Finnish Internet censorship list of the filtered domains were collected on lapsiporno.info, the homepage of Matti Nikki, a Finnish activist criticizing Internet censorship in the European Union and especially in Finland. On 12 February 2008, Nikki's page was also added to the National Bureau of Investigation’s blacklist (Wikinews article). As the list was compiled using links from pornography sites, this list does not tell anything about the last third of the blocked sites.

At September 2008, problems with accuracy continued, when the website of the main international standards organization for the World Wide Web W3C was briefly blacklisted as child pornography by mistake.

In 2008, a government-sponsored report considered establishing similar filtering in order to curb online gambling.

After investigation of complaints about how the law on filtering child pornography has been implemented and the actions of the police, the vice Parliamentary Ombudsman concluded on 29 May 2009 that the police had followed the law and that most sites on the list did have material that could be classified as child pornography at the time they were investigated by the police. He also found that the law is somewhat unclear and that its effect on free speech is problematic and recommends these matters be considered when the law is overseen.

==== The Pirate Bay ====
In 2012, internet service providers Elisa, Sonera (now Telia) and DNA were ordered by Finnish courts to block traffic to The Pirate Bay and put Internet filters on the specific website.

=== Press ===
The Finnish press currently enjoys extensive freedom. Reporters Without Borders' (RWB) annual Press Freedom Index listed Finland as the country with the freest press for six years in a row between 2010 and 2016. In 2017, Finland fell to third place following an incident dubbed "Sipilägate": Prime Minister Juha Sipilä had pressured the national broadcaster Yle when it had covered a possible conflict of interests concerning him. RWB Secretary General Christophe Deloire cited Finland losing the first place as the most important development in press freedom surveyed by the Index that year.

== See also ==
- Media of Finland
