= Mass media in Finland =

Mass media in Finland includes, a variety of online, print, and broadcast formats, such as radio, television, newspapers, and magazines.

== Newspapers ==
Åbo Underrättelser, a Swedish-language newspaper published in Turku, Finland, began publication in 1824. It is the oldest newspaper still published in Finland.

== Radio ==
Yleisradio Oy began in 1926.

== See also ==
- Telecommunications in Finland
- Internet in Finland
- Cinema of Finland
- Censorship in Finland

== Bibliography ==
- "Finland: Directory: the Press". Europa World Year Book. Europa Publications. 2004. ISBN 978-1-85743-254-1.
- Ross Eaman (2009). "Finland". Historical Dictionary of Journalism. Scarecrow Press. ISBN 978-0-8108-6289-0.
