= Lapsiporno.info =

Finnish website

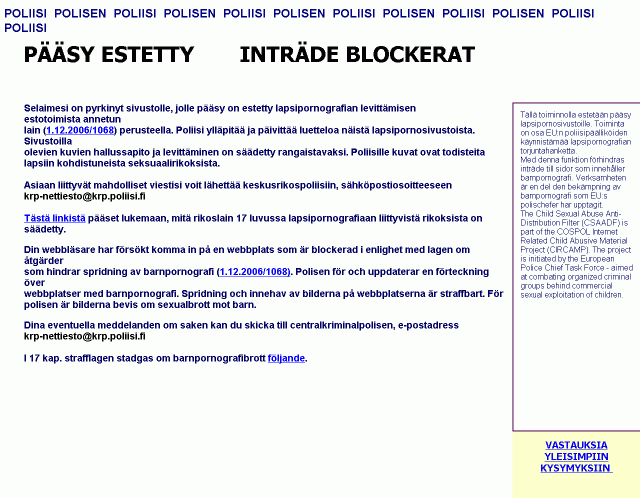
This announcement can be seen when trying to access the site.

Lapsiporno.info ("child porn info") is a Finnish website opposed to Internet censorship. The website was founded and is maintained by software developer, researcher and Internet activist Matti Nikki, who previously attracted international attention by analyzing Sony BMG's digital rights management rootkit that the company's products automatically installed on users' computers. The website focuses on the internet censorship in Finland, its effectiveness, and the issues and problems related to it.

By December 2007, following changes in Finnish legislation, Keskusrikospoliisi, the Finnish National Bureau of Investigation (NBI), had compiled a secret blacklist of websites that it deemed to contain child pornography and sent it to Finnish Internet service providers. Although the filtering is optional, Viestintäministeriö, the Ministry of Communications, has threatened to make it mandatory should service providers not implement it voluntarily. Nikki then wrote a program that scanned through adult websites to find out how the list works. By January 7, 2008, he had scanned through 100,000 websites and wrote on lapsiporno.info that of the 785 censored sites the large majority contained in fact legal pornography.

To prove his claims, Nikki published the results of his research on his website, including a list of the blocked addresses he found. Analyzing the address list, Nikki also noted that the first three Google search results for "gay porn" are censored. Electronic Frontier Finland (EFFI) have noticed that the blacklist includes non-pornographic websites also, including a Windows advice forum, a computer repair service and the Internet Initiative Japan server nn.iij4u.or.jp that, among others, hosts websites for a violin factory, a doll store and a hearing aid manufacturer.

== Censored by the Finnish police ==
On February 12, 2008, after customers of the Finnish ISP Elisa could not access the website, it was found that NBI had added lapsiporno.info to their filtering list. The police have refused to comment on which websites are censored and why, but chief inspector Lars Henriksson of the NBI stated that the list includes websites that contain at least one image that is deemed child porn as well as websites that contain a link to such site. The Finnish law allows the police to list sites that fulfill the two criteria of containing child pornographic material (defined as being images that depict children in sexual context) and that are hosted abroad. However, lapsiporno.info is hosted in Finland and does not contain any child pornographic material.

EFFI has demanded NBI to explain why a website that only contained articles and a list of blocked addresses was censored. Leena Romppainen, member of the board of EFFI, stated that "if the site really had some illegal content, wouldn't the correct solution be to take the site down and take the site owner to the court? The site is located on a Finnish server and the name of the site owner appears visibly on the root page of the site." Most of the censored websites on Nikki's list are located either in the United States or in the European Union, and Romppainen continued: "The local authorities have taken no action on these sites. Therefore, either the sites do not contain child pornography or the NBI has not informed the local authorities. Both of the alternatives are equally scary." Tero Tilus of EFFI stated that "some faceless official decides which sites the Finns may not see, and this decision cannot be appealed. Now he has apparently decided that net filtering may not be criticised."

Jyrki Kasvi, member of Finnish Parliament, also questioned the legality of censoring lapsiporno.info, noting that according to Finnish law, only websites hosted outside Finland can be added to the filtering list, and reminded that the Minister of Transport and Communications, Susanna Huovinen, who lobbied for the law, had emphasized openness and transparency. EFFI and Kasvi have also voiced concerns about attempts to expand the Internet censorship beyond child pornography, following propositions in the media to censor online gambling websites.

Nikki believes that one of the reasons leading to his website being blacklisted was a function that he added to his address list, which simply turned a list of static text into clickable links. He states that he had already known that the police are adding websites to the filtering list based on this, and said that he will not remove the link functionality, because there is nothing illegal about it. On his website, Nikki has also reminded that the Internet filtering system was originally implemented despite University of Turku's Faculty of Law's statement that the system would be against the Constitution of Finland.

The content of lapsiporno.info was quickly mirrored to other servers, and Nikki has helped this copying by releasing the website content under the Creative Commons license CC-by-nc-sa. On February 14, computer magazine Tietokone reported on its website that NBI's actions had caused several complaints to the Parliamentary Ombudsman as well as to the Office of the Chancellor of Justice. Nikki was questioned by the police, suspected of aiding in distribution of a picture offending sexual morality. These charges were later dropped, but the site still remains censored.

By February 19, a group of Finns had gone through Nikki's list of 1047 censored websites and published their research, according to which nine of the sites contained child pornography, nine were unrelated to pornography, 28 had content hard to categorize as legal or illegal, 46 were (legal) child modeling sites and 879 contained only legal pornography.

In May 2011, three years after Nikki's site was blacklisted, the administrative court of Helsinki ruled in favor of Nikki against blacklisting his website. According to the court, the law could only be used to block access to foreign websites. Both Nikki and NBI said they were deliberating on filing an appeal to the Supreme Administrative Court. Nikki was dissatisfied with the court's decision to not cover his legal fees.

On August 26, 2013, the Supreme Administrative Court overruled the previous decision, allowing the site to be blacklisted again. Nikki briefly considered appealing to the European Court of Human Rights.

On January 21, 2019, Nikki updated the website claiming to have just found out that it has not been on the censorship list "for years". He has claimed that his ISP, maintained by Elisa Corporation, was still filtering access to the site and considered filing a police report against them, claiming that blocking a site that is not in the list is "definitely criminal". This is the latest update of the site as of 2026.

== See also ==
- Human rights in Finland
- Censorship in Finland
