= Internet in Finland =

The internet in Finland was heralded in 1984 by the creation of the Finnish University and Research Network (FUNET) connecting universities, polytechnics, and other research facilities. This was followed, in 1986, by the registration of the top-level domain .fi for Finland. In 1988, FUNET was connected to the global internet through NORDUnet, a network of national research and education networks in Nordic countries.

In 1993, commercial sales of internet connections began in the country. In 2000, broadband internet access was launched commercially and, in 2010, Finland has become the first country in the world to make internet access a legal right.

== History ==
In 1984, the Finnish University and Research Network (FUNET) was created to link Finnish universities. The network provide providing network connections for Finnish universities and polytechnics as well as other research facilities.

In 1986, the .fi top-level domain was registered. This was followed in 1988, by FUNET being connected to the global internet through NORDUnet in 1988.

FICIX was created in 1993 to interconnect Finnish IP networks and commercial sales of internet connections began.

== Broadband ==
Broadband internet access in Finland was launched commercially in 2000 in the form of ADSL.

In October 2009, Finland's Ministry of Transport and Communications committed to ensuring that every person in Finland can access the internet at a minimum speed of one megabit per second starting July 2010.

As of December 2021:

- 80 % of Finnish households have the option of purchasing landline internet of at least 10 Mbit/s, with 71 % having an option for at least 100 Mbit/s and 60 % having an option for at least 1000 Mbit/s
- 99.4 % of Finnish homes are within range of a 30 Mbit/s 4G mobile internet connenction, while 77.1 % are reached by a 300 Mbit/s 5G connection.

== Internet service providers ==
Some of the largest Finnish Internet service providers include:

- Telia
- Elisa
- DNA

== Censorship ==
Some ISPs are using a voluntary child pornography censorship list administered by the police. The list has been criticised because it has contained legal adult content, that little has been done to actually shut down the illegal websites and, as the list is secret, it can be used for any censorship. More recently, a government-sponsored report has considered establishing similar filtering in order to curb online gambling.

Also, there are legally binding court orders to block The Pirate Bay issued to all major ISPs.

== Web browsers ==
As of 2024, most used web browsers according to Statcounter were:

Web browser	Market share	Reference
Chrome	71%	
Safari	11%	
Firefox	7.8%	
Edge	5.0%	
Samsung Internet	2.0%	
Opera	1.6%	
Yandex Browser	0.17%	
UC Browser	0.09%	
Explorer	0.09%	
other	0.23%	

As of 2024, most used web browsers according to Cloudflare were:

Web browser	Market share	Reference
Chrome	62%	
Safari	14%	
Firefox	8.9%	
Edge	7.3%	
Samsung Internet	2.9%	
Opera	1.6%	
Brave	1.2%	
Yandex Browser	0.49%	
DuckDuckGo Private Browser	0.33%	
Avast Secure Browser	0.06%	
Aloha Browser	0.04%	
Mi Browser	0.04%	

== See also ==
- Right to Internet access
- Telecommunications in Finland
