= Natural Fruit Company =

Thai fruit wholesaler

Natural Fruit Company, Ltd. (NFC), also called "Natfruit", is a Thai privately owned fruit wholesaler, specializing in pineapple. It was established on 17 March 2001 to manufacture canned pineapple and pineapple juice concentrate. The company was established with a registered capital of 84 million baht. The factory has production capacity of 400 tons of raw material per day and employs a workforce of from 500 to 800 persons. Natfruit is located in Pran Buri, Prachuap Khiri Khan Province, an area known for its pineapples.

Natfruit is part of NatGroup, a family-owned assortment of related private businesses. It includes Prafic (aloe vera products), Prafic 2005 (dried fruits) as well as packaging and logistics companies.

== Natural Fruit labour practices ==
In 2013 and 2014 the company attracted notoriety for its lawsuits—two criminal and two civil damage claims seeking 400 million baht (US$11 million)—against British human rights worker Andy Hall. Hall had been commissioned by Finnish NGO Finnwatch to investigate migrant labour rights abuses in Thai factories supplying Finnish retailers. He submitted his findings to Finnwatch, which published a report based on them on its website. Hall was listed as a co-author, although he had no hand in writing the report, which is entirely in the Finnish language, but with an executive summary in English. The summary enumerated human and labour rights violations (such as the use of underage labour, migrant worker passport confiscation, and unpaid overtime) by Natfruit. In 2013, Natfruit filed suit against Hall for defamation and violation of the Thai Act on Computer Crime for allegedly making false statements to public media. Conviction on this charge could lead to seven years in prison and a fine of up to £6.6 million. One of the Andy Hall prison sentences was cancelled by the Supreme Court in Thailand in November 2016. Other lawsuits continue.

On 18 September 2015, an appeals court threw out a defamation case, originally brought by Natural Fruit against Hall in September 2013, saying that police never should have investigated the charges. Natural Fruit accused Hall of defaming the company in an interview he gave to Al Jazeera while in Burma (Myanmar). The court said that because the interview did not take place in Thailand, the case had no grounds for being heard in Thailand.

On 18 January 2016, Hall was indicted by a Bangkok court on charges of criminal defamation and computer crimes related to his investigations of Natfruit. He faces up to seven years in jail if found guilty at a 12-day trial at Bangkok South Criminal Court starting on 19 May.

On 20 September 2016 Hall was found guilty of criminal defamation and in violation of Thailand's Computer Crimes Act. The court sentenced Hall to prison for four years and ordered him to pay a 150,000 baht fine. His prison sentence was reduced to three years and suspended for two years because of his record as a human rights defender. Hall will appeal the ruling. The president of Natural Fruit, Wirat Piyapornpaiboon, commented on the ruling by saying, "No foreigner should think they have power above Thai sovereignty,..."

Natfruit actions have been criticized by a number of activist organizations (such as Finnwatch and Human Rights Watch), trade unions (such as International Transport Workers' Federation, International Union of Food, Agricultural, Hotel, Restaurant, Catering, Tobacco and Allied Workers' Association), as well as some European food companies. The State Enterprise Workers' Relations Confederation of Thailand (SERC) has voiced its support for Hall. The company has received support from the Thai government.

On 26 March 2018, the Prakanong Court in Bangkok issued its verdict on the civil damages claim against Hall, ordering him to pay 10 million baht (US$320,000) in damages to the company. The court also ordered Hall to pay 10,000 baht to the plaintiff's lawyer and court fees including interest of 7.5 percent from the date of filing this case until the amount is fully paid. Hall will appeal the decision.

On 31 May 2018 the Thai Court of Appeals acquitted Hall of defamation, overturning a lower court ruling. Natural Fruit Co Ltd sued Hall for defamation following an interview he gave to Al-Jazeera English TV in Myanmar in April 2013. The Appeals Court ruled that Hall had not acted unlawfully as charged by the prosecution. The court further ruled that, based on the evidence before it, Hall had indeed interviewed migrant workers from Natural Fruit's factory and there was the real possibility of labour rights violations against migrant workers at Natural Fruit. Natural Fruit can appeal the Appeals Court ruling to the Thai Supreme Court.

== See also ==
- Human rights in Thailand
- Human rights in Finland
- Finnwatch
- United Fruit Company
