= Finnwatch =

Finnish non-profit organization

- Formation: 2009
- Type: non-profit, non-governmental organization
- Location: Helsinki, Finland
- Website: www.finnwatch.org

Finnwatch is a Finnish civic organisation focused on global corporate responsibility. It seeks to promote ecologically, socially or economically responsible business by engaging companies, economic regulation and public discussion. Behind Finnwatch there are Finnish development and environment organisations and trade unions. The member organisations of Finnwatch are Service Centre for Development Cooperation), Trade Union Solidarity Centre of Finland, Friends of the Earth Finland, Finn Church Aid, Attac Finland, Pro Ethical Trade and Kehys.

The organisation monitors the impacts of business actions of Finnish or strongly Finnish-related companies in developing countries. Based on its research Finnwatch contributes to public discussion and seeks to influence on Finnish and EU corporate responsibility policy.

Finnwatch started operating November 1, 2002, as a cooperation project of some civic organisations and trade unions. In 2009 Finnwatch was registered as a separate association and started operating independently in autumn 2010.

Finnwatch's actions are guided by a board and its president Pekka Ihalainen. The executive director of the organisation is Sonja Vartiala.

Finnwatch works in close collaboration with Swedwatch in Sweden and Norwatch in Norway since many companies are owned jointly by many Nordic countries. Finnwatch participates in an EU-funded project called makeITfair on consumer electronics.

== Andy Hall ==
British human rights defender and migrant worker expert Andy Hall conducted a research in Thailand on pineapple concentrate producer Natural Fruit by the order of Finnwatch. There was a report published on the research in January 2013. After that Natural Fruit sued Hall claiming financial losses and slander.

On 20 September 2016 Hall was found guilty of criminal defamation and violation of Thailand's Computer Crimes Act. The court sentenced Hall to prison for four years and ordered him to pay a 150,000 baht fine. His prison sentence was reduced to three years and suspended for two years because of his record as a human rights defender. Hall will appeal the ruling.

== Publications ==
Finnwatch publish reports that are freely available (in Finnish: julkaisut). Main language is Finnish. When the publication is written in cooperation with foreign organizations, it may be available in the other national language Swedish or foreign languages like English. In case of wider interest and available finance reports can be translated.

=== Reports in English ===
The following Finnwatch reports can be found fully translated into English.

==== From Congo with blood ====
The escalation of violation in Congo exacerbates the problem of conflict mineral. Securing human rights in the middle of the conflict isn't easy. The accountability of electronics companies buying raw materials from Congo vary.

==== Mobile responsibility? ====
Despite some progress has been seen there are still significant shortages in mobile operators' responsibility conduct. A report published as a part of the Europe-wide project of consumer electronics makeITfair.

==== Phony Equality ====
Starvation wages and insecure temporary contracts are an everyday part of Indian electronic industry. Finnwatch makeITfair research examines terms and condition of employment in Nokia's and its subcontractors' Salcomp, Flextronics and Foxxcon factories in Chennai free-trade zone.

==== Game console and music player production in China ====
This survey updates the research done two years ago regarding working conditions in factories producing game consoles, mp3-players and their components. There has been progress but wages too low for decent living and the lack of free trade unions are commonplace. The research provides new information about Foxconn factories that have gained publicity due to the wave of employees' suicides.

==== Coal from the East and the South ====
A report on the responsibility in energy company purchases in Finland. The original report was published in Finnish in September 2010.

=== Most important reports in Finnish ===
==== Cheap has a high price ====
There has been found serious human rights violations from the production chain of Finnish grocery store's private labels. Executive summary available in English.

==== When in Rome..? ====
Several Finnish companies restrict their employees' right to unite in Mexico. This way they violate human rights and their own responsibility policy.

==== Bangladesh textile industry ====
Bangladesh textile industry was value of €18 billion in 2011. Finnwatch reports work income in average as €40 in month in a 6 work day week. 80% of work force is women. Cloth producers in Bangladesh include H&M, Zara, Wal-Mart, and Tesco.

==== Meat from Brazil ====
About 20% of the rainforest in Brazil has already been destroyed. Brazil is among the largest meat importers in chicken and beef. Concerns include the deforestation of Amazon, and work conditions. The International Union of Food IUF strives to improve the work conditions and to reduce the risk of work related illnesses in Brazil. A Finn eats 74 kg meat annually in average. World average is 42 kg. In 2009 & 2010 imported meat from Brazil to Finland was 5.4 million kg, i.e. only one kg pro person used in restaurants and industry. In 2010 Brazil produced 9.3 million t (M t) beef with import 1.9M t, 11.4 M t chicken with import 3.3 M t. The production of beef increased 45% during 1997–2010 (from 6.4 to 9.3 Mt) The value of import of chicken increased 17% from 2009 to 2010 $6.8 billion in total. Soy bean cultivation and cattle raising are the key reasons for Amazon deforestation since 1990. Area of UK has been lost. The Sustainable Beef Working Group started in 2007 among WWF, JBS, Marfrig and Carrefour. Swedwatch found out that Sweden imported 42 000 beef from Amazon area in 2010 that were at worst 90-100% responsible for Amazon deforestation. Greenpeace have pointed out JBS in town Barra do Garças in Mato Grosso as one major contributor in the deforestation. North Trade has made commerce with JBS. Here in Sweden operating North Trade gave the responsibility policy and the list of meat origin. HKScan Swedish partner Annerstedt Flodin imported in 2008 6659 beef raised in expense of the Amazon rainforest. It claimed control impossible. The major Brazilian meat importer STC-Meat did not answer the questionnaire. Inex Partners and Meira Nova gave producers, but Kesko did not. Many importers claimed conducting audits but data was not public to confirm the results. Finnwatch recommends for the companies to establish ethical codes and to control the work, health and environment issues.

==== Coal in Finland ====
In the coal mines have been reported severe safety, environment or human rights defeats. Finnwatch reported that Finnish companies did not control well their origin of coal. Most coal was used by Pohjolan Voima, Fortum, Helsingin Energia and Rautaruukki. During 2007–2009 coal import was 18.3 million t from 72.5% Russia, US 7.3%, Canada 6.6%, Australia 5.9%, Poland 3.0%, South Africa 1.4%, Columbia 1.3% and Indonesia 1.1%. The majority of coal was from Russia from areas with severe accidents. Finland imported coal from countries that had not ratified the ILO agreement of the health and safety in mines in 2010. Non ratifiers were Russia, Canada, Australia, Columbia, Kazakhstan, Indonesia and China. Energy business has high corruption risk.

==== Responsibility of health care companies ====
In 2018 health care services were private 6% and social services 32%. According to Finnwatch responsible companies pay all taxes including VAT and personal salaries without aggressive tax planning, and use of tax control weakness in the country were value is made and do not use tax paradises. The real owners and stakeholders of the business should be transparent. Responsible companies inform paid taxes and key figure transparent and when international data is provided also country specific.

Finnwatch analysed in May 2019 responsibility of six biggest health care companies in Finland: Attendo, Mehiläinen, Cor Group also known as Coronaria, Pihlajalinna, PlusTerveys and Terveystalo. All companies could improve. Best company had score 5 out of 11 and worst 2 out of 11. Finnwatch recommended legislative changes to make income tax equal to everyone.

== See also ==
- Service Centre for Development Cooperation
- Worldwatch Institute
- Germanwatch
