= Åbo Underrättelser =

Swedish-language newspaper published in Finland

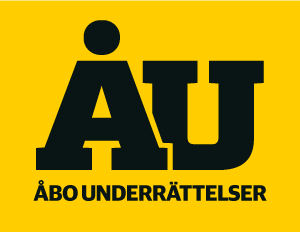
- Type: Newspaper
- Format: Tabloid
- Owner(s): ÅU Media Ab
- Founder(s): Christian Ludvig Hjelt
- Editor-in-chief: Susanna Landor
- Founded: 1823; 202 years ago
- Political alignment: Neutral
- Language: Swedish
- Headquarters: Gezeliusgatan 2, Åbo, Finland
- Country: Finland
- Circulation: 4768 (2023)
- Website: abounderrattelser.fi

Åbo Underrättelser is a Swedish language newspaper published in Turku (Swedish: Åbo), Finland. Åbo Underrättelser, or ÅU in short, is the oldest newspaper still published in Finland.

== History and profile ==
Åbo Underrättelser is the oldest newspaper still in print in Finland, founded by Christian Ludvig Hjelt in 1823. The first edition of the paper was published on 3 January 1824.

Åbo Underrättelser is published five times per week, from Tuesday to Saturday, and has its headquarters in Turku (Åbo in Swedish).

The newspaper's primary readership consists of Swedish-speakers in Turku and Åboland. The circulation of the paper was 4800 copies in 2023.

== See also ==
- Media of Finland
