= Swedwatch =

Non-profit organization

- Type: Non-profit, non-governmental organization
- Location: Sweden
- Website: Swedwatch.org

Swedwatch is an independent, non-profit organization reporting on business relations in developing countries. Swedwatch is an independent research organization whose task is to critically examine business relations with developing countries focusing on environmental and social concerns as per international human rights law and standards. Swedwatch have five member organizations: Diakonia, Fair Trade Center, Friends of the Earth, Swedish Latin America group, The Swedish Society for Nature Conservation (SSNC) and Church of Sweden.

== Reports in English ==
Available reports in English include:

- A Lot of Gold, A Lot of Trouble 2012 June 20: Mineral Invest AB operation to explore and trade gold in the DR Congo
- Lost Revolution 2012 May 4: Low wages and long working hours of the garment workers in Bangladesh
- Out of focus November 2011: Digital camera companies in Vietnam
- An ugly exploration 2011 November 26: Oil and gas believed to be found in the Ogaden region of Ethiopia
- Riskanalys av glas, järn, betong och gips 2011.03.29
- Voices from DRC on conflict minerals 2010.10.13
- Lack of formal audits in Namibian uranium mine 2010.09.15

== Soybean and deforestation in Brazil ==
About 19% of the rainforest in Brazil has already been destroyed. The key reasons for ongoing deforestation in Brazil are soy bean cultivation and cattle raising. In 2002-2010 the land area of UK was added in the soybean cultivation. Soybean cultivation may not be a problem as such, but large monoculture areas and loss of rain forest may be in conflict with the local law and international agreements, add the use EU denied problematic chemicals, add climate change gases, and conflict with the rights of local peoples. Deforestation is fastest in Mato Grosso area, where soybean cultivation doubled in 1996-2006.

Sweden imports annually 385,000 t soybean and 10,000 t beef from Brazil. Soybean is mainly used for animal feed in Sweden. The major soybean importers are Lantmännen and Svenska Foder via Norwegian company Denofa. The major beef importers are North Trade and Annerstedt Flodin. Control of the Swedish companies in the Brazil deforestation was not sufficient. Swedwatch recommends better control, public control reports that can be criticized, and. selection of partners based on certifications.

Brazilian certification initiatives include ProTerra restricting genetic modification, Round Table on Responsible Soy (RTRS) accepting genetic modification (e.g. Maggi, Monsanto, Bunge, Cargill, Carrefour, Coop Schweiz, Unilever, Denofa and Swedish Lantmännen and Svensk mjölk and WWF), and Brazilian Certification.

== Swedish nuclear and Namibia uran ==
The import of uranium by Vattenfall has been criticized in the Swedish media and the Parliament e.g. on 23 March 2010. Vattenfall imports uranium from Namibia, Rössing Uranium Mine owned by Rio Tinto. Rössing Mine do not allow any visitors in the mine area and do not answer any questions concerning the employee health and safety and environmental protection. In 2008 SOMO, the Netherlands, made a health study of the mine workers in Namibia. Vattenfall had not made any official controls for six years in 2010.

== Gold in Congo ==
Swedwatch investigated at Mineral Invest AB business norms in gold explore, exploit and trade in the DR Congo. The Swedish financial regulator and public trading have insufficient regulation and guidance for companies operating in difficult or post-conflict countries. Mineral Invest has contracted Congolese military to provide security. The unit has been implicated in the ethnic slaughter of pygmies and cannibalism. The soldiers have also been accused of extorting gold from miners.

== Risk analysis of glass, iron, and concrete in public housing ==
Risk analysis of glass, iron, concrete used in a public building in Stockholm.

== Criticism of Sweden’s carbon credits purchase ==
Sweden is committed to reducing its greenhouse gas emissions by about 20 million tonnes per year. Between 1990 and 2009 Sweden's emissions decreased slightly, but they increased again in 2010. In line with Swedish emissions targets, a third of the reduction will be achieved by purchasing carbon credits. About the hydropower project in northern India to buy carbon credits. The project is partly financed by a fund administered by the World Bank. There were numerous problems concerning health and safety, working conditions and migrant workers. Study highlights a lack of accountability, doubts about additionality and sustainable development.

== See also ==
- Finnwatch
- Germanwatch
- Worldwatch Institute
