= Piraattiliitto =

Piraattiliitto ("The Pirate Alliance") is a Finnish organization established to support citizens' rights to freely use and share information and culture. The organization opposes all types of "big brother" societies and the weakening of protection of privacy. Piraattiliitto provides news, information and a discussion forum focused on file-sharing, intellectual properties, piracy, freedom of speech and digital culture.

Piraattiliitto states that its goal is a copyright reform which would see non-commercial copying allowed and the length of copyright for commercial use reduced. The organization asserts that "people should be encouraged to share culture instead of stopped from doing it" and that copyright laws which prevent the use of a work even 70 years after the death of its author are "absurd". Piraattiliitto has criticized the Finnish copyright law for being one-sided and for leading to unreasonably large damages and an "atmosphere of fear".

In November 2007, Piraattiliitto was voted second in the "person of the year" category by readers of the computer magazine Tietokone.

== See also ==
- 2005 amendment to the Finnish Copyright Act and Criminal Code
- Civil and political rights
- Criticism of copyright
- Piratbyrån
- Right to privacy
