= Radiolinja =

Finnish GSM operator

- Industry: Cellular Service Provider
- Founded: September 19, 1988; 36 years ago
- Fate: Acquired by Elisa
- Headquarters: Finland

Radiolinja was a Finnish GSM operator founded on September 19, 1988. On March 27, 1991, the world's first GSM phone call was made on Radiolinja's network. The network was opened for commercial use on July 1, 1991.

Radiolinja's slogan was So that Finns could talk more; it became famous through an advertising campaign.

When Radiolinja launched, Finland's incumbent mobile operator, Telecom Finland (later changed to Sonera, now part of Sweden's TeliaSonera) was already operating a first generation mobile network on the NMT technology. Thus, Radiolinja's launch was also the start of mobile telecom competition in Europe. Several global firsts happened on the Radiolinja network, including the world's first person-to-person SMS text message, sent in 1993; the world's first fixed-mobile service bundle, launched in 1996; and the world's first paid downloadable mobile content, a ringtone, in 1998.

Radiolinja's original investors included the Finnet Group, a consortium composed of a number of Finnish corporations and local telephone companies. In the mid-1990s, Elisa (known then as Helsinki Telephone Ltd) began acquiring a greater stake in Radiolinja, ultimately leading to the mergers of Radiolinja, Radiolinja Origo, and Elisa. At this point, Elisa had also acquired some of Radiolinja's other major stakeholders, such as Soon Communications (previously Tampere Telephone Plc and before that Tampere Telephone Cooperative).

Currently the company is known as Elisa.
