= Telecommunications in Finland =

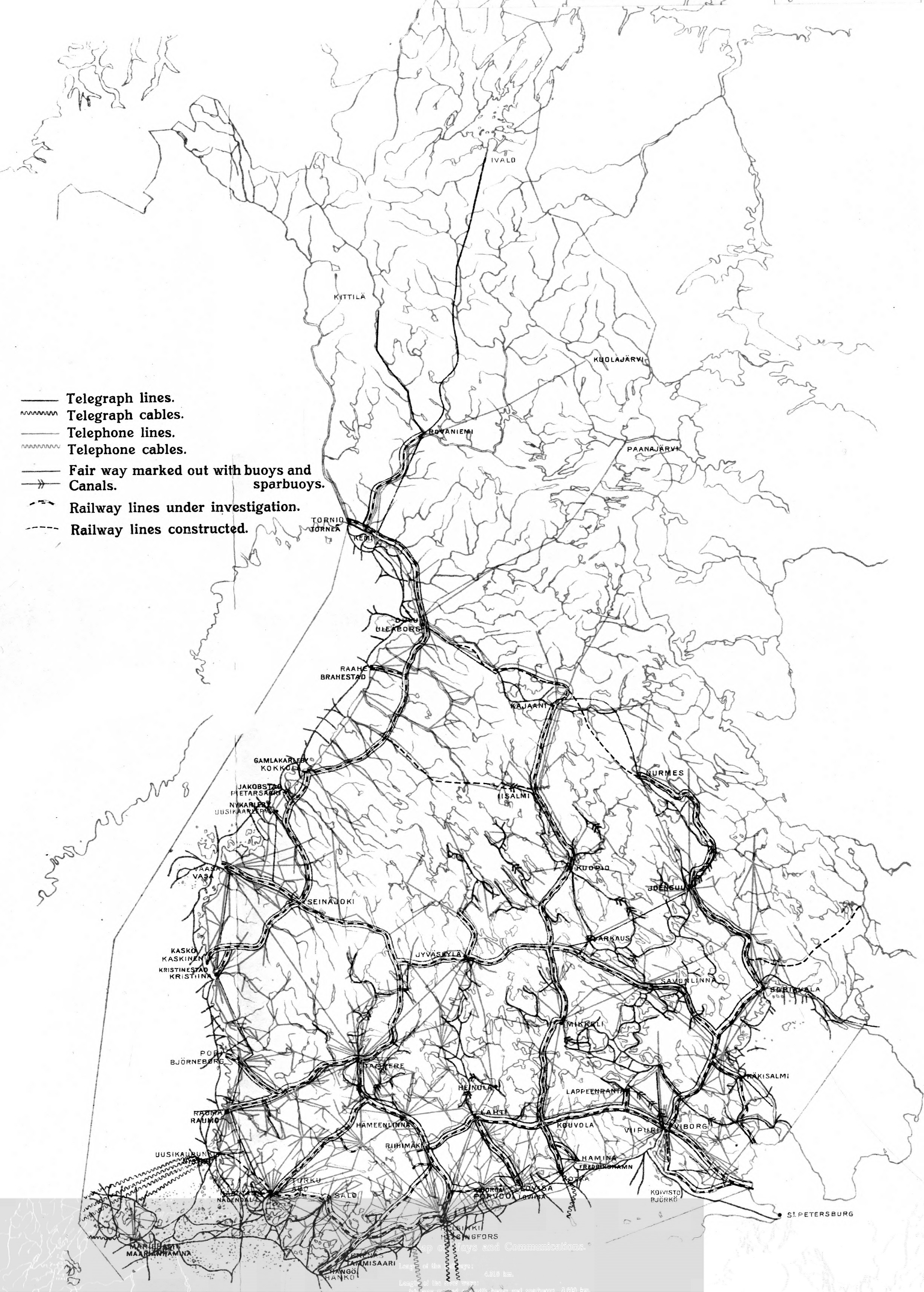
Map of Finland, 1920, with telephone and telegraph lines marked.

Telecommunications in Finland, as indicated by a 2022 European Commission index, highlight the country's significant role in the EU's digital sector. Finland has a high concentration of Information and Communication Technology (ICT) specialists and robust training programs, leading to notable expertise in technologies like AI and cloud computing. The nation has also made significant advancements in 5G technology. Additionally, Finland stands out for its high adoption of digital public services. The Finnish digital sector benefits from both the technology industry's contributions and government policies aimed at enhancing digital infrastructure and cybersecurity.

== Internet and digital progress ==
=== Fixed broadband ===
In the European Commission's 2022 Digital Economy and Society Index (DESI) report, Finland is ranked 8th in connectivity among 27 EU countries, but it faces challenges in its digital infrastructure. Fixed broadband adoption stands at 61%, below the EU average of 78%. Very High Capacity Network (VHCN) coverage is 68%, slightly lower than the EU's 70%, with rural areas affected, having only 12.4% VHCN coverage. Fiber to the Premises (FTTP) coverage is at 40%, compared to the EU average of 50%. To address these issues, the Finnish government plans to expand VHCN coverage through national broadband and digital infrastructure initiatives. Despite funding challenges, the government allocated EUR 16 million from the European Agricultural Fund for Rural Development (EAFRD) in 2021 for fiber network development.

=== Mobile broadband ===
Finland's mobile broadband performance is strong, with 72% 5G coverage, surpassing the EU average of 66%, and a 96% mobile broadband adoption rate, exceeding the EU average of 87%. This achievement can be attributed to extensive 4G and 5G availability, covering 72% of populated areas. The early allocation of 5G pioneer bands (700 MHz in 2016, 3.6 GHz in 2018, and 26 GHz in 2020) has played a key role in achieving this widespread coverage. Recent frequency usage changes near Russia are expected to further improve 5G services in those regions.

=== Integration of digital technology ===
The country ranks at the forefront of digital technology integration within the EU. Notably, 82% of Finnish small and medium-sized enterprises (SMEs) exhibit basic digital intensity, higher than the EU average of 55%. Finland distinguishes itself in the adoption of advanced technologies, with 22% using big data, 66% of companies utilizing cloud solutions, and 16% implementing artificial intelligence (AI)—figures that are higher than the EU averages of 14%, 34%, and 8%, respectively. Further, 83% of Finnish companies have adopted e-invoices in contrast to the EU's average of 32%. On the aspect of ICT for environmental sustainability, 77% of Finnish enterprises report medium or high intensity of green action through ICT, which exceeds the EU average of 66%.

=== Digital public services ===
Finland has established itself as a leader in digital public services within the EU, as evidenced by the DESI 2022 report, which notes that 92% of Finnish internet users engage with e-government services compared to the EU average of 65%. This high level of engagement is attributed to Finland's progress in digital services, as seen in the My Kanta portal, which promotes digital health by providing citizens with secure access to their medical records and health services online.

In the areas of open data and artificial intelligence (AI), Finland achieves scores of 90 and 93 out of 100 for providing digital services to citizens and businesses, respectively, surpassing the EU averages of 75 and 82. An example of Finland's application of AI to enhance public services is the AuroraAI program, which is designed to facilitate personalized access to a range of public services. Additionally, Finland is enhancing its digital identity infrastructure to offer a secure, unified electronic identification system, improving access to digital services across sectors. The Ministerial Working Group on "Digitalisation, Data Economy, and Public Administration" is tasked with both advancing and safeguarding Finland's digital framework, which includes a focus on cybersecurity.

== Telephones ==
Telephones – main lines in use: 2.368 million (2004)

Telephones – mobile cellular: 4.988 million (2004)

Telephone system: General Assessment: Modern system with excellent service.

Domestic: Digital fiber-optic fixed-line network and an extensive cellular network provide domestic needs. There are three major cellular network providers with independent networks (Elisa Oyj, Telia Finland and DNA Oyj). There are several smaller providers which may have independent networks in smaller areas, but are generally dependent on rented networks. There is a great variety of cellular providers and contracts, and competition is particularly fierce.

International: Country code – 358; 2 submarine cable (Finland-Estonia and Finland-Sweden Connection); satellite earth stations – access to Intelsat transmission service via a Swedish satellite earth station, 1 Inmarsat (Atlantic and Indian Ocean regions); note – Finland shares the Inmarsat earth station with the other Nordic countries (Denmark, Iceland, Norway, and Sweden).

== Radio and television ==
There is a national public radio and television company Yleisradio (Yle), which was previously funded by television license fees, but nowadays via the YLE tax. and two major private media companies, Alma Media and Sanoma, with national TV channels. Yle maintains four TV channels YLE1, YLE2, Teema and FST5. There are four commercial, national channels: Alma Media has MTV3 and SubTV, and Sanoma has Nelonen and Jim. There are also a lot of pay-TV channels. News Corporation introduced itself to the market in 2012 with the Fox channel, which was preceded by Finnish-owned SuomiTV.

=== Radio broadcast stations ===
AM 2, FM 186, shortwave 1 (1998)

=== Television broadcast stations ===
120 (plus 431 repeaters) (1999)

Television is broadcast as digital (DVB-T) only since August 2007. On cable, only digital (DVB-C) will be broadcast from 2008 on. All standard definition broadcasts ended in 2025, HD transmissions use DVB-T2 or DVB-C.

== See also ==
- Finland
- Media of Finland
