= KEPA =

Kepa is a service base for nongovernmental organizations in Finland interested in development work and global issues. It is a politically and ideologically independent organization that operates with funding from the Ministry for Foreign Affairs of Finland. Kepa acts as a mouthpiece of Finnish development NGOs, hosts events such as the World Village Festival and publishes the Maailman Kuvalehti magazine. Kepa operated also the Etvo programme (Etelän vapaaehtoisohjelma meaning "The Volunteer Programme of South"). It was discontinued in 2016 following cuts to the Finnish development aid, which is the main source of Kepa's funding.

Kepa's head office is in Helsinki. It also has offices in Tanzania and Mozambique.

The name Kepa is originally an acronym from Kehitysyhteistyön palvelukeskus (Service Centre for Development Cooperation), but the organization officially re-branded itself as Kepa in 2012. In 2018, Kepa will merge with another Finnish umbrella organization, Kehys. The new organization will assume a new name and brand.
