= Andy Hall (activist) =

Migrant worker, researcher and activist

Andrew Jonathan Hall (born 30 October 1979 in Spalding, Lincolnshire, England) is a migrant worker and labour rights activist and researcher, formerly based in South East Asia.

In early 2013 Hall was sued by Natural Fruit Company following the publication of the Finnwatch report "Cheap Has a High Price". Hall claimed to have interviewed workers for the report, some of whom were undocumented migrants and reported poor working conditions, unlawfully low wages, confiscation of official documents, use of child labour and excessive overtime. Altogether Natural Fruit has brought four cases against Hall, for alleged defamation and computer crimes. Many international human rights organisations and trade unions, as well as UN agencies and the European Parliament and European Trade Commissioner, have condemned Natural Fruit's actions as judicial harassment and an attempt to silence a human rights defender, and called for the cases to be dropped.

At Hall's July 2016 trial, Finnwatch testified that the report alleging human rights abuses by Natural Fruit Co was analysed, written, and published by NGO Finnwatch, not by Hall, who was hired merely as a local investigator. However, Hall is identified in the report as the leader of the Finnwatch investigation in Thailand.

== Lawsuits ==
Of the four lawsuits against Mr Hall, for which he could face up to 7 years in prison, the two criminal cases have been ruled in his favour already. On 5 November 2016, the Supreme Court ruled in favour of Mr Hall on the charge of criminal defamation (Aljazeera interview case) dismissing the case for a third and final time. On 31 May 2018, the Appeals Court rules in favour of Mr Hall on the charge of criminal defamation and computer crimes (Finnwatch report case). The two remaining cases are both civil defamation claims, one of which has been ruled in favour of Natural Fruit.

On 20 September 2016 Hall was at a court of first instance (Bangkok South Criminal Court) found guilty of criminal defamation and violation of Thailand's Computer Crimes Act. The court sentenced Hall to prison for four years and ordered him to pay a 150,000 baht fine. His prison sentence was reduced to three years and suspended for two years because of his record as a human rights defender. Hall appealed the ruling. The president of Natural Fruit, Wirat Piyapornpaiboon, commented on the ruling outside the Court house to international media, saying, "No foreigner should think they have power above Thai sovereignty,..."

On 26 March 2018, the Prakanong Court in Bangkok issued its verdict on the civil damages claim against Hall, ordering him to pay 10 million baht (US$320,000) in damages to the company. The court also ordered Hall to pay 10,000 baht to the plaintiff's lawyer and court fees including interest of 7.5 percent from the date of filing this case until the amount is fully paid. Hall will appeal the decision, particularly given the Supreme Court had already in 2016 dismissed the accompanying criminal case.

The Thai Court of Appeals more recently on 31 May 2018 acquitted Hall of criminal defamation and computer crimes, overturning a lower court ruling. The Appeals Court ruled that Hall had not acted unlawfully as charged by the prosecution. The court further ruled that, based on the evidence before it, Hall had indeed interviewed migrant workers from Natural Fruit's factory and there were labour rights violations against migrant workers at Natural Fruit, and that the research was in the public interest. Natural Fruit can appeal the Appeals Court ruling to the Thai Supreme Court.
