= Finnish Board of Film Classification =

Valtion elokuvatarkastamo Logo

The Finnish Board of Film Classification (Finnish: Valtion elokuvatarkastamo; Swedish: Statens filmgranskningsbyrå) was an official institution of the Finnish Ministry of Education. From 1946 until the end of year 2011, the VET/SFB was responsible for inspecting and rating the content of movies and video games. In the beginning of 2012, the VET/SFB was dissolved and its functions were transferred to the Finnish Centre for Media Education and Audiovisual Media (Finnish: Mediakasvatus- ja kuvaohjelmakeskus or MEKU; Swedish: Centralen för mediefostran och bildprogram), likewise operating under the Ministry of Education.

== Scope ==
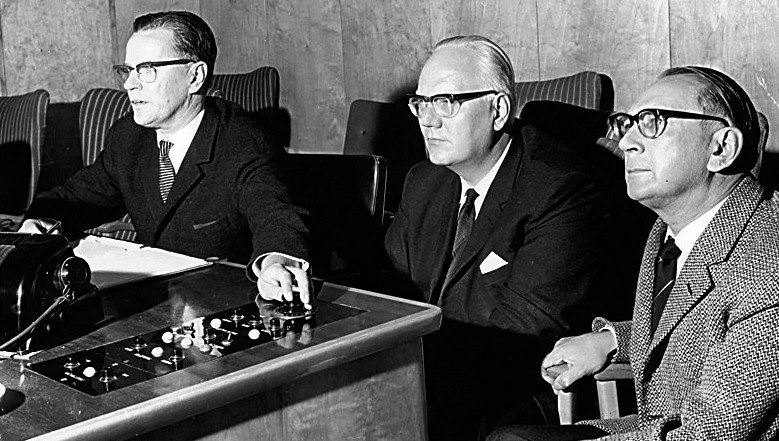
Three censors at work in 1963: Erkki Nuorvala (to the left), Ola Wickström and Paavo Tuomari.

Only material intended to be accessible to minors (those under 18 years of age) was subject to mandatory inspection before being released to the public. A proper notification was usually sufficient for adult material, but the board has the right to inspect any material suspected of violating laws or material. Until 2001, VET also inspected material intended for adult audiences and could prevent releasing it in Finland if the board deemed it exceedingly violent.

Distributors and producers could appeal against decisions of VET/SFB to the government-appointed Appeal Board. Since 2003, Finland has been a participant of the pan-European PEGI-system for rating interactive games.

== Age ratings ==
The Finnish Board of Film Classification had a film classification system under which films were classified into one of the following categories:

- S – For all ages
- K-7 – For people 7 years or older. Under 7s require parental guidance for admittance into the film.
- K-12 – For people 12 years or older. Under 12s require parental guidance for admittance into the film.
- K-16 – For people 16 years or older. Under 16s require parental guidance for admittance into the film.
- K-18 – Only for adults over 18. Minors are not admitted. May contain very coarse language (although language cannot be used as a justification for age rating), explicit sexual content, extreme graphic violence (with or without sadistic manners) sexual violence, pornography, explicit drug references and/or explicit drug use which is considered unsuitable for children under 18. All cinemas in Finland are legally required to check the identity of any patron that wishes to view a K-18 rated film and the cinema strictly prohibits persons under 18 to view K-18 films.
- KK – Banned from commercial distribution. There were several grounds on which a movie could be banned in 1966–2001: 1. violation of good manners, 2. immorality, 3. demoralization, 4. detrimental to mental health, 5. harmful to public peace or safety or to national defence, 6. worsening of Finland’s relations to foreign powers.

A person at most two years younger (currently three years) than the given rating was permitted to see a film in a movie theater when accompanied by an adult, except for movies rated 18 which were (and still are) proscribed to anyone under 18 (even if accompanied with an adult)
