= Lex Karpela =

The 2005 amendment to the Finnish Copyright Act and Criminal Code, commonly known as Lex Karpela, was an amendment to make the Finnish copyright legislation and criminal code comply with the EU Copyright Directive 2001/29/EC. It was presented to the President of Finland by Culture Minister Tanja Karpela.

The amendment was accepted by the Finnish parliament in a vote on 5 October 2005. It came into effect on 1 January 2006.

== Purpose ==
The purpose of the amendment was to update the copyright legislation for the special features of digital and network environments, and apply the changes required by the EU Copyright Directive. The amendment additionally includes national legislation solutions independent of the directive.

The main features of the amendment are:

- Unauthorized file sharing can be punished as a crime, even though it wouldn't be done for profit.
- Downloading illegal copies on the Internet will be prohibited. Downloading for personal use won't be punished, but it may lead to claims for damages, if the copier knows or should have known that the source is illegal.
- Importing illegally manufactured works and material is prohibited.
- Circumventing copy prevention measures (i.e. DRM) to copy a work is prohibited. Circumventing the protection to watch or listen to the work is still legal.
- Works bought from outside the European Economic Area may be distributed only if the first sale inside EEA was accepted by the author. A work bought for personal use may be distributed as before.
- Archives, libraries and museums may produce copies of works for internal use using whatever technique necessary. Showing the work on a computer screen inside the facility is allowed.
- Works may be copied using special techniques for people with disabilities without permission.
- A published work may be presented publicly in services of worship and education without permission.

== Controversy ==
=== Prohibition of circumventing copy protection ===
Section 50a of the new law prohibits copying works for personal use if the work is protected by an "effective technical measure". Even an effective protection may be circumvented to watch or listen to the work, though.

The restriction has been a subject of controversy and the interpretation is yet to see. Open questions are e.g. whether it's legal to circumvent a copy protection to convert the work to a format usable on a portable MP3 player, or whether a copy-protected CD can be reproduced as a standards-compliant audio CD to listen to it on a car radio.

=== Freedom of speech ===
Section 50b prohibits distributing products or services that make possible or facilitate the circumvention of copy protection. The preamble says that offering these services in an organized or commercial manner would be the kind of distribution that the law refers to. This has been seen as restricting the freedom of speech.

== Reception ==
A demonstration against the bill was held in the afternoon of 4 October 2005. According to an estimate by the police, roughly 300 people participated. Almost all attendees were young adults and all political youth organizations from political right to left supported the demonstration.

== See also ==
- Piraattiliitto
