= Elisa (company) =

Finnish telecommunications company

Elisa Corporation
- Native name: Elisa Oyj
- Formerly: Helsingin Puhelin (until 2000); Elisa Communications Oyj (2000–2003)
- Type: Julkinen osakeyhtiö
- Traded as: Nasdaq Helsinki: ELISA
- Industry: Telecommunicatons
- Founded: 31 January 1882; 144 years ago (as HPY, Swedish: HTF)
- Founder: Daniel Wadén
- Headquarters: Helsinki, Uusimaa, Finland
- Area served: Finland; Estonia
- Key people: Christoph Vitzthum (Chairman); Topi Manner (CEO); Jari Kinnunen (CFO)
- Products: Telecommunications, ICT and digital services
- Revenue: ▲€2.191 billion (2024)
- Net income: ▲€504 million (2022)
- Number of employees: ▲5,781 (2024)
- Subsidiaries: Main subsidiaries e.g. camLine Gmbh, Elisa Eesti AS, Elisa IndustrIQ Finland (Leanware Oy), Elisa Polystar Slovakia s.r.o., Elisa Polystar Sweden Ab, Elisa Polystar UK ltd, Elisa Santa Monica Oy, Enia Oy, Fenix Solutions Oy, Fonum Oy, FRINX s.r.o., Kepit Systems Oy, sedApta s.r.l., TenForce NV
- ASN: 719, 6667
- Peering policy: Selective
- Traffic Levels: 500-1000 Gbps
- Website: www.elisa.com

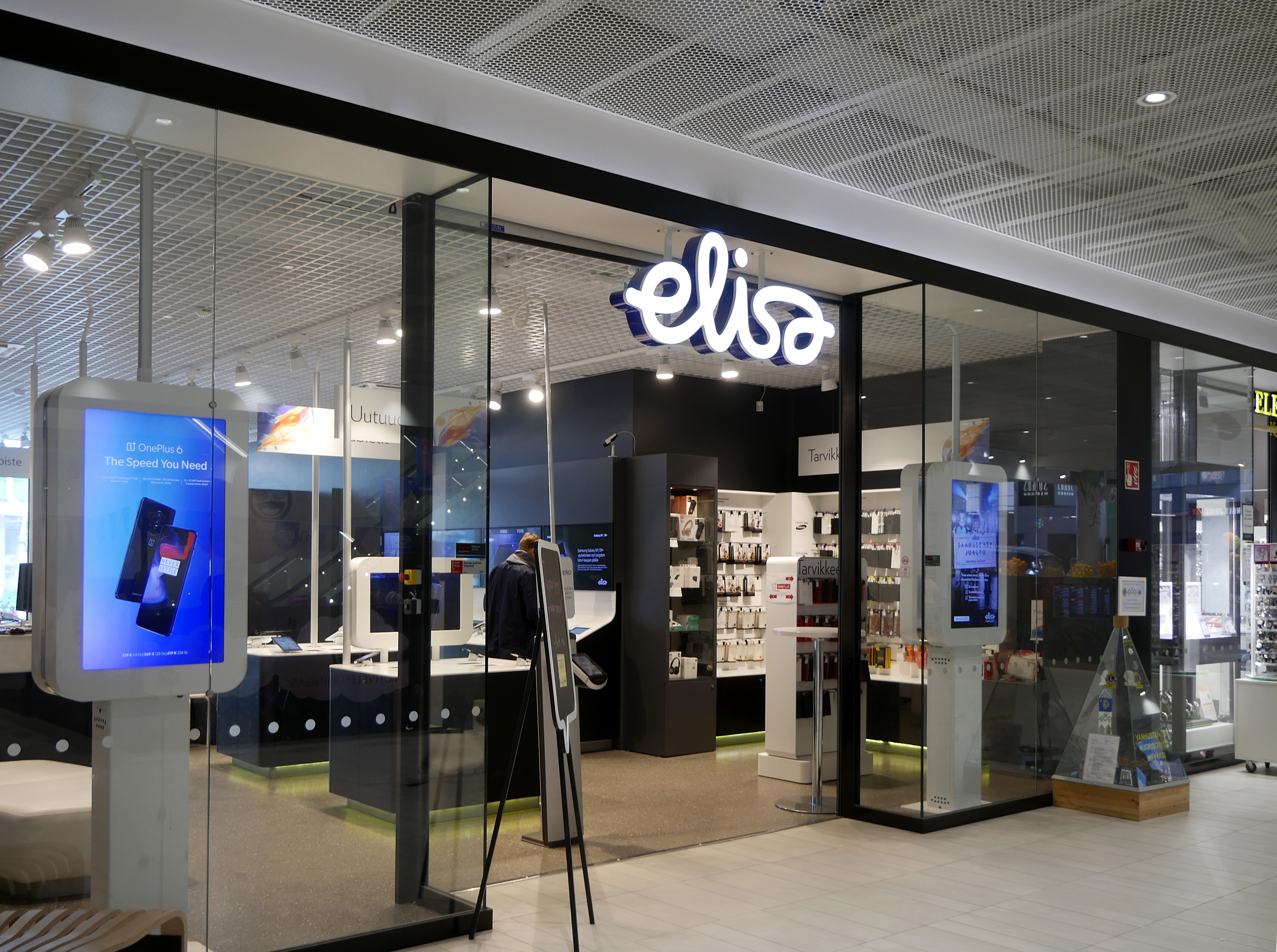
Elisa store

Elisa Corporation (natively Elisa Oyj) is a Finnish telecommunications company founded in 1882. It was called HPY (Swedish: HTF) until July 2000. The mobile operations of Elisa were previously known as Radiolinja.

Elisa is a telecommunications, ICT and digital services company and its home markets are Finland and Estonia. Internationally Elisa offers digital software services in over 100 countries. Elisa's external reporting segments are Consumer Customers, Corporate Customers and International Software Services. Elisa has over 2.8 million consumer, corporate and public administration customers.

Largest shareholders are Finnish national institutions (Solidium Oy, Ilmarinen and Varma).

The company's range of services includes fixed and mobile phone subscriptions and broadband connections, sold under both the Elisa and Elisa Saunalahti brands, as well as cable television subscriptions, related services, and digital services such as Elisa Viihde.

== History ==
Elisa was originally established on 31 January 1882 by the electrical engineer Daniel Wadén as a telephone cooperative called the Helsinki Telephone Association (Finnish: Helsingin puhelinyhdistys, HPY; Swedish: Helsingfors telefonförening, HTF). HPY began serving customers on 6 June 1882 by connecting 56 phone numbers; by 1884 the number of yearly calls surpassed one million.

HPY started expanding during the 1920s and 30s by merging with smaller cooperative telephone operators. In 1921, HPY and the over 400 other privately operated telephone cooperatives then existing in Finland formed the Puhelinlaitosten liitto ("Federation of Telephone Companies") consortium, which was renamed as Finnet in 1996. The company reached its current geographical operating field in 1958. HPY's original form of incorporation, a mutual association, was changed to a legal cooperative ("Helsingin puhelinosuuskunta") in 1995, listed on the Helsinki Stock Exchange as Helsingin Puhelin Oyj in 1997, and then changed again to a joint-stock company under the name HPY Holding Oyj. HPY was eventually demutualised in 2000, and was renamed as Elisa Communications Oyj. Elisa Communications Oyj left the Finnet consortium in 2001, and would eventually unify all of its offerings under the Elisa branding in 2003–2004.

Elisa launched the first commercial GSM service under the Radiolinja brand in 1991 and the world's first commercial UMTS900 network on 8 November 2007.

Investment company Novator Partners acquired a 10.4% stake in Elisa in 2005 through a share swap when Elisa bought the smaller operator Saunalahti, which had been mostly owned by Novator. Novator tried to revamp Elisa in December 2007, but was opposed by Finnish institutions such as Varma Mutual Pension Insurance Company. In October 2008, during the Icelandic financial crisis, Novator sold its entire stake in Elisa to Varma for 194 million euros (US$266 million), a price of €11.20 per share.

On 27 June 2018, Elisa launched the world's first commercial 5G network in the Finnish city of Tampere and in the Estonian capital of Tallinn.

Elisa had previously founded Elisa Automate, a startup focused on automating network using artificial intelligence. Polystar was merged with it, resulting in Elisa Polystar In March 2020, Elisa acquired a majority of US-based CalcuQuote and in 2021 a share of Italian-based sedApta and later during the year majority share of Belgian-based Tenforce.

In April 2022, Elisa acquired Slovak-based FRINX and in August Cardinality Ltd. At the end of 2022, Elisa's 5G network had population coverage of 86% in Finland and 70% in Estonia.

In February 2022, Elisa received a EUR 3.9 million grant from the Finnish Ministry of Economic Affairs and Employment to support its investment in a Distributed Energy Storage (DES) solution based on intelligent management of the backup power of mobile base stations. The aim is to build 150 MWh of storage capacity, making it the largest distributed DES project in Europe.

On the evening of 25 December 2024, authorities were informed of disturbances in four telecommunications cables leaving Finland, with two Elisa cables being completely cut.

== Logos ==
(2000–2004)

(2004–2014)

(2014-)

== See also ==
- List of mobile network operators in Europe
