= Corporate Affairs and Intellectual Property Office =

Barbadian governmental agency

The Corporate Affairs and Intellectual Property Office (CAIPO) is a Barbadian governmental agency in charge of various aspects of industrial property right affairs including: patents, trademarks, and industrial designs. It is a division of the Ministry of Industry, Innovation, Science & Technology, formerly known as the Ministry of Industry & International Business. Around 2010 Barbados was recognised for its ranking as one of the top countries where foreign patents are legally based. CAIPO's office was located on Belmont Road, and moved in March 2013 to Baobab Towers, in Warrens, Saint Michael.

In 2021 the body opened its corporate registry for online registration.

== National legislation ==
Corporate affairs in Barbados are covered by the following Acts:

- Companies Act
- Registration of Business Names Act
- Bills of Sale Act
- Small Business Development Act
- Notarial acts
- Public Documents Act
- Pharmacy Act
- Limited Partnerships Act
- Registration of Newspapers Act
- Trade Unions Act

Intellectual property in Barbados are covered by the following Acts:

- Trademarks Act
- Patents Act
- Industrial Designs Act

At the international level, the department works very closely with the World Intellectual Property Organization (WIPO) and its subregional unit known as the Cooperation for Development Bureau for Latin American and Caribbean.

== Treaties and conventions ==
Barbados is a signatory to the following copyright and intellectual property treaties and conventions influencing local laws:

Treaty or Convention	Year it was established	Locally ratified into law
Berne Convention for the Protection of Literary and Artistic Works	1886	ratified: 30 July 1983
Geneva Convention for the Producers of Phonograms Against Unauthorized Duplication	1971	ratified: July 29, 1983
Hague Convention Abolishing the Requirement of Legalisation for Foreign Public Documents - (the Convention Abolishing the Requirement of Legalisation for Foreign Public Documents)	1961	Succession for Barbados 30 November 1966. Barbados maintains that since the United Kingdom entered into the agreement on 24 February 1965 that it is compulsory for Barbados which didn't become independent until 1966.
Nice Agreement concerning the International Classification of Goods and Services for the Purposes of Registration of Marks	1967	ratified: 12 March 1985
Nairobi Treaty (Olympic Symbol)		ratified: 28 February 1986
Paris Convention for the Protection of Industrial Property	1883 (as revised in 1967)	ratified: 12 March 1985
Patent Cooperation Treaty (PCT)	1970	ratified: 12 March 1985
Rome Convention for the Protection of Performers, Producers of Phonograms and Broadcasting Organisations	1961	ratified: 18 September 1983
Universal Copyright Convention (UCC-Geneva)	1952	ascension: 3 March 1983
Universal Copyright Convention (UCC-Paris)	(as revised in 1971)	ascension: 3 March 1983
Membership to the WIPO
WTO-TRIPS Agreement on the Trade Related Aspects of Intellectual Property	1994	ratified: 1 January 1995

Currently Barbados has yet to finalise or is absent from:

Treaty or Convention	Year it was established	Note
Brussels Convention Relating to the Distribution of Programme–Carrying Signals Transmitted by Satellite	1974	Some provisions within the United States–Caribbean Basin Initiative already have recourse for United States-based satellite providers to be compensated through other means within that act.
Budapest Treaty on the International Recognition of the Deposit of Microorganisms for the Purposes of Patent Procedure (Budapest)	1977
Patent Law Treaty (PLT)	2000
WIPO Copyright Treaty (WCT)	1996
WIPO Performances and Phonograms Treaty (WPPT)	1996

== Criticisms ==
In 2021 CAIPO faced criticism by some members of the public for the pace the body conducts its business.

== Domain names and trademarks ==
Additionally, CAIPO is entrusted with the handling of legal issues pertaining to Barbados' .bb ccTLD and second-level domains including: .co.bb, .com.bb, .net.bb, .org.bb, .info.bb, .store.bb, .tv.bb, .biz.bb .

== See also ==
- Patent office
- List of parties to international copyright treaties
- List of parties to international patent treaties
- List of parties to international related rights treaties
- List of company registers
