= Intellectual Property Agency of Armenia =

- Հայաստանի մտավոր սեփականության գործակալություն

Patents agency overview
- Formed: January 1992; 34 years ago
- Jurisdiction: Armenia
- Headquarters: Republic Square, Government House 3, Yerevan
- Patents agency executive: Kristine Hambaryan, Head of Agency
- Parent Patents agency: Ministry of Economy
- Website: www.aipa.am/en/

The Intellectual Property Agency of Armenia (AIPA) (Armenian: Հայաստանի մտավոր սեփականության գործակալություն) is the patent office of Armenia. The agency works under the supervision of the Ministry of Economy of Armenia and is tasked with granting patent and IP address protections, trademarks, and copyrights for objects of industrial property, inventions and usage patterns, industrial design, and commercial and service marks, among others.

== History ==
The Intellectual Property Agency of Armenia was founded in January 1992. At present, the legal field of intellectual property is regulated by laws and legal acts, as well as, the international agreements of the Government of Armenia. The head of the agency is Kristine Hambaryan.

== International cooperation ==
Since 1993, Armenia is a member of the World Intellectual Property Organization (WIPO). Armenia signed the Eurasian Patent Convention (EAPC) in September 1994 and subsequently joined the Eurasian Patent Organization (EAPO) in November 1995. The AIPA also cooperates with the European Patent Office (EPO), as well as, other international and regional structures and foreign offices.

In 2011, the Danish Patent and Trademark Office signed a cooperation contract with the AIPA.

On 18 November 2019, the Intellectual Property Agency of Armenia signed a Memorandum of Understanding with the South Korean Invention Promotion Association (KIPA). The memorandum stipulates that KIPA will share with AIPA its own intellectual property teaching programs.

=== International patent and copyright treaties ===
Armenia has ratified several international patent and copyright treaties. Armenia ratified both the Patent Cooperation Treaty and the Paris Convention for the Protection of Industrial Property on 25 December 1991. The TRIPS Agreement was ratified by Armenia on 5 February 2003, the Budapest Treaty on 6 March 2005, the Hague system on 13 July 2007, and the Patent Law Treaty on 17 September 2013.

Armenia has also ratified the WIPO Copyright Treaty, the Berne Convention, the Rome Convention, the Singapore Treaty on the Law of Trademarks, the Madrid system, the Geneva Phonograms Convention, and is a member of the International Organization for Standardization.

== Activities ==
The agency publishes a monthly newsletter in Armenian and Russian. Within the frameworks of patent information exchange, the monthly publications are sent to Patent Offices of foreign countries, international organizations, and to libraries and other organizations within Armenia. The agency also publishes full descriptions of patented inventions and utility models and annual reports.

In November 2017, the US Embassy in Yerevan began training Armenian legal experts on intellectual property rights, with topics ranging from counterfeit products and smuggling to customs fraud and money laundering.

On 20 May 2019, the International Federation of Reproduction Rights Organisations (IFRRO) met with Kristine Hambaryan, Head of the Intellectual Property Agency of Armenia in Yerevan. The two sides discussed how to strengthen cooperation between both organisations.

On 16 October 2019, the European Union and Armenia held a joint conference on trademark policy and legislative developments in Brussels. Armenia ensured that it would meet EU intellectual property requirements as set out in the Armenia-EU Comprehensive and Enhanced Partnership Agreement.

== See also ==
- European Patent Organisation
- Intellectual property
- Intellectual property organization
- List of parties to international copyright agreements
- List of parties to international patent treaties
- Outline of patents
