= WIPO Performances and Phonograms Treaty =

1996 international treaty, in force 2002

The WIPO Performances and Phonograms Treaty (or WPPT) is an international treaty adopted in Geneva on 20 December 1996. It came into effect on 20 May 2002. The treaty deals with the rights of two kinds of beneficiaries, particularly in the digital environment: performers (actors, singers, musicians, etc.); and producers of phonograms (persons or legal entities that take the initiative and have the responsibility for the fixation of sounds).

As of July 2026, the treaty has 115 contracting parties. The Treaty is open to States members of World Intellectual Property Organization (WIPO) and to the European Community. The treaty is administered by WIPO. The WPPT and the WIPO Copyright Treaty are together termed WIPO Internet Treaties.

== History ==
=== Rome Convention and digital age ===
The direct predecessor of the WIPO Performances and Phonograms Treaty was the Rome Convention, adopted in 1961. At the time, it was recognized as a “pioneer convention” because it established standards for the protection of the rights of performers and producers of phonograms, as well as the rights of broadcasting organizations. These rights, commonly referred to as “neighboring rights” or “related rights” did not yet exist in the great majority of countries.

With the technological developments of the 1970s and 1980s, it became necessary to adapt certain intellectual property rights to the digital age. Initial efforts focused primarily on copyright. In fact, the WIPO Performances and Phonograms Treaty emerged as a by-product of a WIPO work program to modernize the Berne Convention for the Protection of Literary and Artistic Works.

In 1989, the Contracting Parties to the Berne Convention, working through WIPO, agreed to establish a committee of experts to update the Convention. In 1992, it was decided to divide the committee into two, following disagreements over the inclusion of sound recordings, since the United States sought to have them included in the new protocol, while the European Union and other countries argued that phonograms did not fall within the scope of their national copyright laws or the Berne Convention, since they were protected under the system of neighbouring rights and were covered by the 1961 Rome Convention. The opinion of European Union prevailed, as consequence, the first committee focused on developing a "protocol" to the Berne Convention that would extend copyright protection to computer programs and databases, while the second was tasked with developing a new treaty on the rights of performers and producers of phonograms. The work of this second committee would eventually lead, years later, to the WPPT.

Amid the discussions, in 1994, the TRIPS Agreement was adopted, by the members of the World Trade Organization. This agreement incorporated many protections for producers of phonograms and performances, but it did not respond to all challenges posed by the emerging technologies. So, the negotiations of the treaty on phonograms were adjusted to address the issues and expand the rights granted by the TRIPS.

=== Diplomatic Conference and adoption ===
Between August and September 1996, WIPO’s committee of experts began circulating three draft treaties for discussion at the Geneva Diplomatic Conference: the first addressed the extension of copyright protection under the Berne Convention; the second dealt with related rights, particularly phonograms, drawing on the Rome Convention; and the third focused on the intellectual property protection of databases.

The Diplomatic Conference was held in Geneva, Switzerland, from December 2 to 20, 1996, with representatives from 157 WIPO Member States.

During the Diplomatic Conference, the three draft treaties presented a few months earlier were considered, but the proposed treaty on databases was ultimately set aside. On December 20, the conference adopted both the WIPO Performances and Phonograms Treaty, abbreviated WPPT, and WIPO Copyright Treaty, or WCT. Together, the two agreements would become known as the WIPO Internet Treaties.

The WIPO Performances and Phonograms Treaty entered into force in 2002. As of July 11, 2026 it had 115 Contracting Parties.

== Content ==
WPPT was adopted with an objective to develop and maintain the protection of the rights of performers and producers of phonograms in a manner as effective and uniform as possible. This treaty would not disturb the existing obligations that Contracting Parties have to each other under the International Convention for the Protection of Performers, Producers of Phonograms and Broadcasting Organizations done in Rome, 26 October 1961 (Rome Convention). Articles 18 and 19 of the WPPT provide similar obligations for performers and producers of phonograms to contracting states as provided under Articles 11 and 12 of the WIPO Copyright Treaty (WCT).

The Treaty deals with the rights of two kinds of beneficiaries, particularly in the digital environment: performers (actors, singers, musicians, etc.); and producers of phonograms (persons or legal entities that take the initiative and have the responsibility for the fixation of sounds).

- As far as performers are concerned, the Treaty grants performers economic rights in their performances fixed in phonograms (not in audiovisual fixations, such as motion pictures): the right of reproduction; the right of distribution; the right of rental; and the right of making available.
- As to unfixed (live) performances, the Treaty grants performers: the right of broadcasting (except in the case of rebroadcasting); the right of communication to the public (except where the performance is a broadcast performance); and the right of fixation.
- The Treaty also grants performers moral rights (the right to claim to be identified as the performer and the right to object to any distortion, mutilation or other modification that would be prejudicial to the performer's reputation).
- As far as producers of phonograms are concerned, the Treaty grants them economic rights in their phonograms: the right of reproduction; the right of distribution; the right of rental; and the right of making available.

As to limitations and exceptions, Article 16 of the WPPT incorporates the so-called "three-step test" to determine limitations and exceptions, as provided for in Article 9(2) of the Berne Convention, extending its application to all rights. The accompanying Agreed Statement provides that such limitations and exceptions, as established in national law in compliance with the Berne Convention, may be extended to the digital environment.

The term of protection must be at least 50 years.

The Treaty also obliges Contracting Parties to provide for legal remedies against the circumvention of technological measures (e.g., encryption) and against the removal or altering of information (such as identification of performer). It also obliges Contracting Parties to adopt legal measures to ensure the application of the Treaty.

The Digital Millennium Copyright Act is the United States's implementation of the treaty (see WIPO Copyright and Performances and Phonograms Treaties Implementation Act).

== See also ==
- List of parties to the WIPO Performances and Phonograms Treaty
- Geneva Phonograms Convention
- WIPO Copyright Treaty (WCT)
