= Intellectual property law in Senegal =

Senegalese law

As in most developing countries, intellectual property law in Senegal is weak. Copyright infringement is not regarded as a crime, and it is widely accepted by consumers. Senegal's criminal law provisions do not provide for criminal procedures in case of trademark counterfeiting or copyright piracy on a commercial scale. In addition, because of budget constraints, Senegal's Copyright Office has had difficulty enforcing sanctions against individuals who infringe copyrights in the course of business, including hackers and distributors of infringed copies. Nonetheless, the Copyright Office has begun vigorous attempts against counterfeit media, seizing items as well as putting stickers on legal merchandise. It is currently continuing these enforcement efforts. Microsoft began an anti-piracy campaign in Senegal in early 2004 and reports some success in converting users of pirated Microsoft products through the sale of deeply discounted Microsoft licenses.

== Treaties and law ==
Senegal is a signatory to the Berne Convention. It also is a member of the African Organization of Intellectual Property (OAPI), a grouping of 15 Francophone African countries, which has established among its member states a common system for obtaining and maintaining protection for patents, trademarks and industrial designs. Therefore, rights registered in one member country are valid in all. Patent validity is 20 years. Registered trademarks are protected for 20 years at each registration, renewable without limit.

Senegal is a signatory to the World Trade Organization and its Trade Related Aspects of Intellectual Property Agreement (TRIPS). Since January 2000, Senegal theoretically has been in full compliance with the TRIPS accord, but has yet to deposit its instruments of ratification for WIPO Copyright Treaty and the WIPO Performances and Phonograms.
