= WIPO Copyright Treaty =

1996 treaty on copyright law

WIPO Copyright Treaty WCT
World Intellectual Property Organization Copyright Treaty
- Member states, as of 26 September 2022 Ratified and in force Ratified as part of European Union Ratified, but not yet in force Signed, but not ratified Not signed and not ratified
- Signed: 20 December 1996
- Location: Geneva, Switzerland
- Effective: 6 March 2002
- Condition: 30 ratifications
- Parties: 119
- Depositary: Director-General of the World Intellectual Property Organization
- Languages: English, Arabic, Chinese, French, Russian and Spanish

Full text
- WIPO Copyright Treaty at Wikisource

The World Intellectual Property Organization Copyright Treaty (WIPO Copyright Treaty or WCT) is an international treaty on copyright law adopted by the member states of the World Intellectual Property Organization (WIPO) in 1996. It provides additional protections for copyright to respond to advances in information technology since the formation of previous copyright treaties before it. As of August 2026, the treaty has 119 contracting parties. The WCT and WIPO Performances and Phonograms Treaty, are together termed WIPO Internet Treaties.

== History ==
During the earlier stages of negotiations, the WCT was seen as a protocol to the Berne Convention, constituting an update of that agreement since the 1971 Stockholm Conference. However, as any amendment to the Berne Convention required unanimous consent of all parties, the WCT was conceptualized as an additional treaty which supplemented the Berne Convention. The collapse of negotiations around the extension of the Berne Convention during the 1980s saw the shifting of the forum to the GATT, resulting in the TRIPS Agreement. Thus, the nature of any copyright treaty by the World Intellectual Property Organization became considerably narrower, being limited to addressing the challenges posed by digital technologies.

=== Development of the treaty ===
Beginning in 1989, the Contracting Parties to the Berne Convention, working through WIPO, agreed to establish a committee of experts to update the Convention for the digital age. In 1992, it was decided to divide the committee into two, following disagreements over the inclusion of sound recordings, since the United States sought to have them included in the new protocol, while the European Union and other countries argued that phonograms did not fall within the scope of their national copyright laws or the Berne Convention, since they were protected under the system of neighbouring rights and were covered by the 1961 Rome Convention. As consequence, the first committee focused on developing a "protocol" to the Berne Convention that would extend copyright protection to computer programs and databases, while the second was tasked with developing a new treaty on the rights of performers and producers of phonograms. The work of this second committee would eventually lead, years later, to the WIPO Performances and Phonograms Treaty.

Both committees met several times, separately as well as jointly. The negotiations continued until 1996, during which numerous proposals and amendments submitted by different countries were considered, particularly those from the United States, the European Union, and Japan.

During these discussions, in 1994, the TRIPS Agreement was adopted, by the members of the World Trade Organization. The agreement incorporated many of the protections established under the Berne, Rome, and Paris Conventions, and the Washington Treaty on Integrated Circuits, introducing rules concerning computer programs and databases. It also established a binding dispute settlement system supported by trade sanctions.

=== Diplomatic Conference and adoption ===
Between August and September 1996, WIPO’s committee of experts began circulating three draft treaties for discussion at the Geneva Diplomatic Conference: the first addressed the extension of copyright protection under the Berne Convention; the second dealt with related rights, particularly phonograms, drawing on the Rome Convention; and the third focused on the intellectual property protection of databases.

The Diplomatic Conference was held in Geneva, Switzerland, from December 2 to 20, 1996, with representatives from 157 WIPO Member States.

During the Diplomatic Conference, the three draft treaties presented a few months earlier were considered, but the proposed treaty on databases was ultimately set aside. On December 20, the conference adopted both the WIPO Copyright Treaty, commonly abbreviated as the WCT, and the WIPO Performances and Phonograms Treaty, or WPPT. Together, the two agreements would become known as the WIPO Internet Treaties.

The WIPO Copyright Treaty entered into force in March 2002. As of August 4, 2026, it had 119 Contracting Parties.

== Protection granted by the Treaty ==
The WCT emphasizes the incentive nature of copyright protection, claiming its importance to creative endeavours. It ensures that computer programs are protected as literary works (Article 4), and that the arrangement and selection of material in databases is protected (Article 5). It provides authors of works with control over their rental and distribution in Articles 6 to 8, which they may not have under the Berne Convention alone. It also prohibits circumvention of technological measures for the protection of works (Article 11) and unauthorized modification of rights management information contained in works (Article 12).

The treaty has been criticised for being too broad (for example in its prohibition of circumvention of technical protection measures, even where such circumvention is used in the pursuit of legal and fair use rights) and for applying a "one size fits all" standard to all signatory countries, despite their widely differing stages of economic development and knowledge industry.

== Implementation ==
The WIPO Copyright Treaty is implemented in United States law by the Digital Millennium Copyright Act (DMCA). By Decision 2000/278/EC of 16 March 2000, the Council of the European Union approved the treaty on behalf of the European Community. European Union Directives which largely cover the subject matter of the treaty are: Directive 91/250/EC, creating copyright protection for software; Directive 96/9/EC on copyright protection for databases; and Directive 2001/29/EC, prohibiting devices for circumventing "technical protection measures", such as digital rights management (also known as DRM).

== See also ==
- List of parties to international copyright agreements
- List of parties to international treaties protecting rights related to copyright
- Agreement on Trade-Related Aspects of Intellectual Property Rights (TRIPs)
- Software patents under TRIPs Agreement
- WIPO Performances and Phonograms Treaty (WPPT)
- Anti-Counterfeiting Trade Agreement

== External links and references ==
- The full text of the WIPO Copyright Treaty (adopted in Geneva on December 20, 1996) (in English) in the WIPO Lex database – official website of WIPO.
  - Parties to the Treaty
- Summary: https://www.wipo.int/treaties/en/ip/wct/summary_wct.html
