= Sound recording copyright symbol =

Typographical symbol (℗)

℗o

Sound recording copyright symbol
- In Unicode: U+2117 ℗ SOUND RECORDING COPYRIGHT (&copysr;)

Different from
- Different from: U+24C5 Ⓟ CIRCLED LATIN CAPITAL LETTER P U+24DF ⓟ CIRCLED LATIN SMALL LETTER P

Related
- See also: U+00A9 © COPYRIGHT SIGN; U+00AE ® REGISTERED SIGN

The sound recording copyright symbol or phonogram symbol, ℗ (letter P in a circle), is the copyright symbol used to provide notice of copyright or neighboring rights in a sound recording (phonogram) embodied in a phonorecord (LPs, audiotapes, cassette tapes, compact discs, etc.). It was first introduced in the Rome Convention for the Protection of Performers, Producers of Phonograms and Broadcasting Organisations in 1961.

The letter P in ℗ stands for phonogram, which is the legal term used in many countries to refer to such work. (In U.S. copyright law, the term used is sound recording.)

A sound recording has a separate copyright that is distinct from that of the underlying work (usually a musical work, expressible in musical notation and written lyrics), if any. The sound recording copyright extends only to a particular rendition of a work and not to any other sound recordings of the same underlying work, even if they are created by the same recording artist.

== International treaties ==
The symbol first appeared in the Rome Convention for the Protection of Performers, Producers of Phonograms and Broadcasting Organisations, a multilateral treaty relating to copyright, in 1961. Article 11 of the Rome Convention provided:

If, as a condition of protecting the rights of producers of phonograms, or of performers, or both, in relation to phonograms, a Contracting State, under its domestic law, requires compliance with formalities, these shall be considered as fulfilled if all the copies in commerce of the published phonogram or their containers bear a notice consisting of the symbol ℗, accompanied by the year date of the first publication, placed in such a manner as to give reasonable notice of claim of protection...

When the Geneva Phonograms Convention, another multilateral copyright treaty, was signed in 1971, it included a similar provision in its Article 5:

If, as a condition of protecting the producers of phonograms, a Contracting State, under its domestic law, requires compliance with formalities, these shall be considered as fulfilled if all the authorized duplicates of the phonogram distributed to the public or their containers bear a notice consisting of the symbol ℗, accompanied by the year date of the first publication, placed in such manner as to give reasonable notice of claim of protection...

== United States law ==
The symbol was introduced into United States copyright law in 1971, when the US extended limited copyright protection to sound recordings. The United States anticipated signing onto the Geneva Phonograms Convention, which it had helped draft. On October 15, 1971, Congress enacted the Sound Recording Act of 1971, also known as the Sound Recording Amendment of 1971, which amended the 1909 Copyright Act by adding protection for sound recordings and prescribed a copyright notice for sound recordings. The Sound Recording Act added a copyright notice provision specific to sound recordings, which incorporated the symbol prescribed in the Geneva Convention, to the end of section 19 of the 1909 Copyright Act:

In the case of reproductions of works specified in subsection (n) of section 5 of this title ["Sound recordings"], the notice shall consist of the symbol ℗, (the letter P in a circle), the year of first publication of the sound recording, and the name of the owner of copy right in the sound recording, or an abbreviation by which the name can be recognized, or a generally known alternative designation of the owner...

The provision that currently governs it is in 17 U.S.C. § 402, the codification of the Copyright Act of 1976. That section provides for the a non-mandatory copyright notice on sound recordings:

If a notice appears on the phonorecords, it shall consist of the following three elements:

(1) the symbol ℗ (the letter P in a circle); and
(2) the year of first publication of the sound recording; and
(3) the name of the owner of copyright in the sound recording, or an abbreviation by which the name can be recognized, or a generally known alternative designation of the owner; if the producer of the sound recording is named on the phonorecord labels or containers, and if no other name appears in conjunction with the notice, the producer’s name shall be considered a part of the notice.

== Encoding ==
The symbol has a code point in Unicode at U+2117 ℗ SOUND RECORDING COPYRIGHT, with the supplementary Unicode character property names, "published" and "phonorecord sign."

== See also ==
- Copyright symbol
- Enclosed Alphanumerics
- Related rights § Phonogram producers — the equivalent concept under international law
