= Intellectual Property Committee =

The Intellectual Property Committee was a coalition of thirteen US corporations "dedicated to the negotiation of a comprehensive agreement on intellectual property in the current GATT round of multilateral trade negotiations". The coalition was formed in March 1986 by Bristol-Myers, DuPont, FMC Corporation, General Electric, General Motors, Hewlett-Packard, IBM, Johnson & Johnson, Merck, Monsanto, Pfizer, Rockwell International and Warner Communications.

Members changed throughout 1986 to 1996. By 1994, CBS, DuPont and General Motors quit, and others like Digital Equipment Corporation, Procter & Gamble, and Time Warner had joined.

The agreement on intellectual property which IPC was dedicated to finally arrived in 1994, as the Agreement on Trade-Related Aspects of Intellectual Property Rights (TRIPS) approved by the World Trade Organization at the end of the Uruguay Round.

== See also ==
- Agreement on Trade-Related Aspects of Intellectual Property Rights
- International Intellectual Property Alliance
