= List of parties to international copyright agreements =

Below is a list of countries which have signed and ratified one or more multilateral international copyright treaties. This list covers only multilateral treaties (i.e., treaties by more than two countries). It does not include bilateral treaties (treaties between only two countries). Related rights provide intellectual property rights for performers, producers of sound recordings (phonograms) and broadcasting organisations. In some countries these rights are known simply as copyright, while other countries distinguish them from authors' rights: in either case, the international laws which are concerned with them are distinct from those concerned with literary and artistic works under the Berne Convention for the Protection of Literary and Artistic Works and other treaties.

== Treaties ==
Short name	Long name	Place/act	Date (of signature)	Date (into force)	Notes
Berne	Berne Convention for the Protection of Literary and Artistic Works	Berne	1886-09-09	1887-12-05	
Buenos Aires	Buenos Aires Convention	Buenos Aires	1910-08-11	1913-03-28	Largely deprecated since 2000-08-23, when the last Buenos Aires holdout joined Berne. The Dominican Republic was the first adherent to the Buenos Aires Convention, effective October 31, 1912. The convention came into force when Guatemala became the second adherent on March 28, 1913.
UCC Geneva	Universal Copyright Convention	Geneva Act	1952-09-06	1955-09-16	These have lost significance since almost all members are also members of TRIPS.
UCC Paris	Universal Copyright Convention	Paris Act	1971-07-24	1974-07-10	These have lost significance since almost all members are also members of TRIPS.
TRIPS	Agreement on Trade-Related Aspects of Intellectual Property Rights	Marrakech	1994-04-15	1995-01-01	Membership in TRIPS coincides with membership in the World Trade Organization except for least developed countries, which were granted a grace period; observer governments of the World Trade Organization are marked observer in the table below and painted blue in the third map below.
WCT	WIPO Copyright Treaty	Geneva	1996-12-20	2002-03-06	
MVT	Marrakesh VIP Treaty	Marrakesh	2013-06-28	2016-09-30	Full name is the Marrakesh Treaty to Facilitate Access to Published Works to Visually Impaired Persons and Persons with Print Disabilities.

In addition to these treaties, the Anti-Counterfeiting Trade Agreement (ACTA) is a multilateral treaty governing multiple aspects of intellectual property, including copyright. As of February 2012, ACTA has been signed by 31 countries, but only ratified by Japan. If ACTA is ratified by six or more signatories, it will enter into force thirty days later.

As of August 2024, Eritrea, Marshall Islands, Palau, and WTO Observer countries Iran, Iraq, Ethiopia, Somalia, and South Sudan are not parties to any copyright convention.

== Maps ==
Berne Convention
Ratifications of the Convention as of 2019

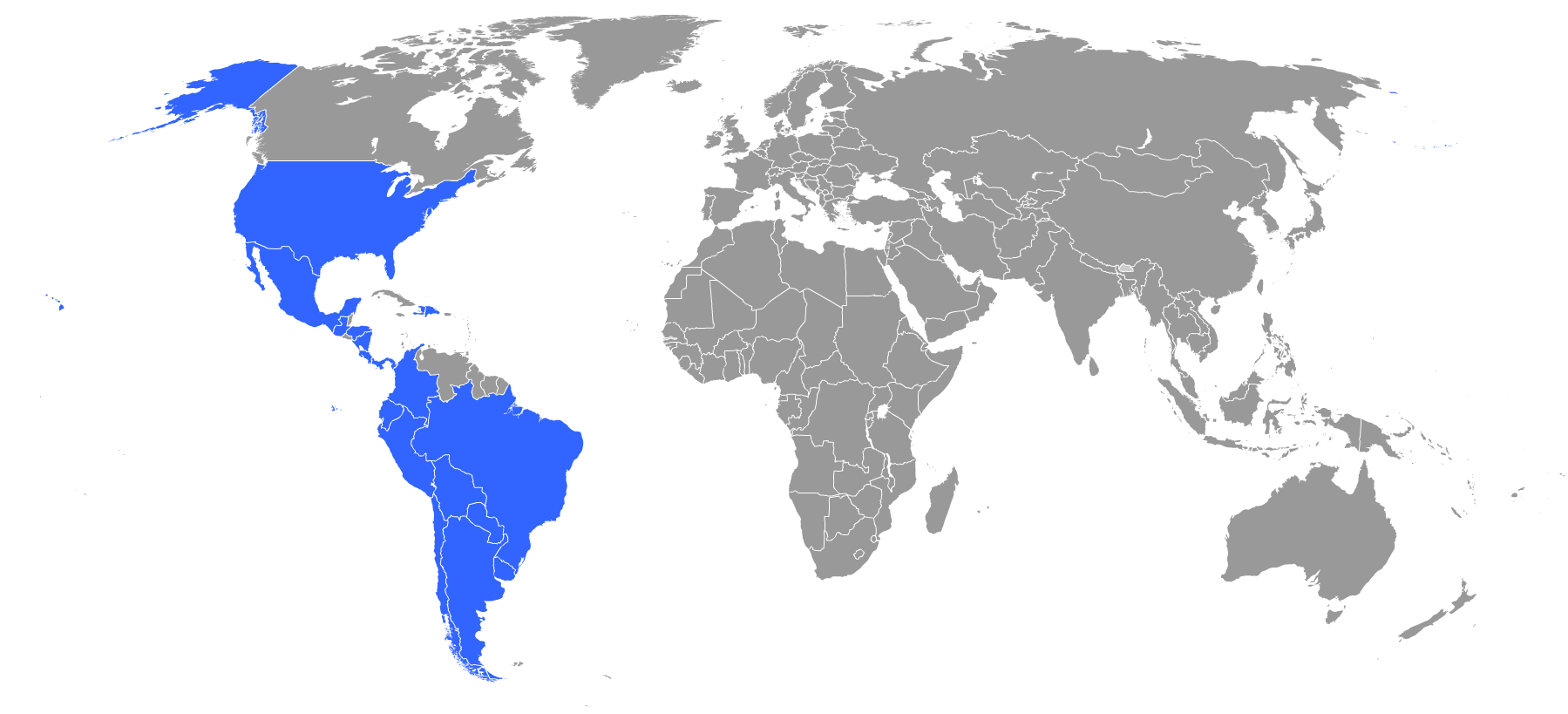
Buenos Aires Convention
Signatories to the Buenos Aires Convention

TRIPS
WTO members (where the TRIPS agreement applies)
Parties to the Agreement where also the membership of the European Union applies
Observers to the WTO

== Table of parties ==
The list below was taken from details supplied by WIPO, UNESCO and the WTO (see references): they are correct as of 2025-09-10 (2000-01-01 for the Universal Copyright Convention), and include some accessions after that date. Dates quoted are the date on which the treaty came into effect for a given country.

Country	Website	Berne	Buenos Aires	UCC Geneva	UCC Paris	TRIPS	WCT	MVT
Afghanistan		2018-06-02				2016-07-29	2021-02-09	2018-10-26
Albania		1994-03-06		2004-02-04		2000-09-08	2005-08-06	
Algeria		1998-04-19		1973-08-28	1974-07-10	Observer	2014-01-31	
Andorra		2004-06-02		1955-09-16		Observer		
Angola						1996-11-23		
Antigua and Barbuda		2000-03-17				1995-01-01		
Argentina		1967-06-10	1950-04-19	1958-12-13		1995-01-01	2002-03-06	2016-09-30
Armenia		2000-10-19				2003-02-05	2005-03-06	2022-09-01
Australia		1928-04-14 (Note: The United Kingdom extended application on 1887-12-05, dates given are those that declared the continue of application as a realm.)		1969-05-01	1978-02-29	1995-01-01	2007-07-26	2016-09-30
Austria		1920-10-01		1957-07-02	1982-08-14	1995-01-01	2010-03-14	
Azerbaijan		1999-06-04				Observer	2006-04-11	2018-12-24
Bahamas		1973-07-10 (Note: Declared the continue of application on 1976-07-05)		1976-10-13	1976-12-27	Observer	2026-10-11	
Bahrain		1997-03-02				1995-01-01	2005-12-15	
Bangladesh		1999-05-04		1975-08-05	1975-08-05	1995-01-01		2022-12-26
Barbados		1983-07-30		1983-06-18	1983-06-18	1995-01-01	2019-12-13	2023-05-20
Belarus		1997-12-12				Observer	2002-03-06	2020-10-22
Belgium		1887-12-05		1960-08-31		1995-01-01	2006-08-30	
Belize		2000-06-17		1983-03-01		1995-01-01	2019-02-09	2019-02-09
Benin		1960-08-01 (Note: Declared the continue of application on 1961-01-03)				1996-02-22	2006-04-16	
Bhutan		2004-11-25				Observer		
Bolivia		1993-11-04	1914-05-15	1990-03-22	1990-03-22	1995-09-12	Signed	2019-06-12
Bosnia and Herzegovina		1992-03-01 (Note: Formerly a part of Yugoslavia, which became a party of Berne Union on 1930-06-17, became an independent member on the date given, declared the continue of application on 1993-06-02)		1966-05-11 (as Yugoslavia)	1974-07-10 (as Yugoslavia)	Observer	2009-11-25	2021-04-20
Botswana		1998-04-15				1995-05-31	2005-01-27	2017-01-05
Brazil	Biblioteca National	1922-02-09	1915-08-31	1960-01-13	1975-12-11	1995-01-01		2016-09-30
Brunei		2006-08-30				1995-01-01	2017-5-2	
Bulgaria		1921-12-05		1975-06-07	1975-06-07	1996-12-01	2002-03-06	
Burkina Faso		1963-08-19				1995-06-03	2002-03-06	2017-10-31
Burundi		2016-04-12			1995-07-23	1995-07-23	2016-4-12	
Cambodia		2022-03-09		1955-09-16		2004-10-13		
Cameroon		1960-01-01 (Note: Declared the continue of application on 1964-09-21)		1973-05-01	1974-07-10	1995-12-13	2025-4-09	2022-01-05
Canada	Canadian Intellectual Property Office (CIPO)	1928-04-10		1962-08-10		1995-01-01	2014-08-13	2016-09-30
Cape Verde		1997-07-07				2008-07-23	2019-5-22	2019-05-22
Central African Republic		1977-09-03				1995-05-31		2020-11-19
Chad		1971-11-25				1996-10-19		
Chile		1970-06-05	1955-06-14	1955-09-16	1995-01-01	1995-01-01	2002-03-06	2016-09-30
China, People's Republic	National Copyright Administration; CNIPA	1992-10-15		1992-10-30	1992-10-30	2001-12-11	2007-06-09	2022-05-05
Colombia		1988-03-07	1936-12-23	1976-06-18	1976-06-18	1995-04-30	2002-03-06	2025-05-27
Comoros		2005-04-17				2024-08-21	2021-04-25	2021-04-25
Congo, Democratic Republic		1960-06-30 (Note: Declared the continue of application on 1963-10-08)				1997-01-01		
Congo, Republic		1960-08-15 (Note: Declared the continue of application on 1962-05-08)				1997-03-27		
Cook Islands		2017-08-03					2019-06-19	2019-06-19
Costa Rica		1978-06-10	1916-11-30	1955-09-16	1980-03-07	1995-01-01	2002-03-06	2018-01-09
Côte d'Ivoire		1962-01-01			1995-01-01	1995-01-01		2020-12-17
Croatia		1991-10-08 (Note: Formerly a part of Yugoslavia, which became a party of Berne Union on 1930-06-17, became an independent member on the date given, declared the succession on 1992-07-28)		1966-05-11 (as Yugoslavia)	1974-07-10 (as Yugoslavia)	2000-11-30	2002-03-06	
Cuba		1997-02-20		1957-06-18		1995-04-20		
Cyprus		1960-08-16 (Note: Declared the continue of application on 1964-02-24)		1990-12-19	1990-12-19	1995-07-30	2003-11-04	
Czech Republic		1993-01-01		1960-01-06 (as Czechoslovakia)	1980-04-17 (as Czechoslovakia)	1995-01-01	2002-03-06	
Denmark		1903-07-01		1962-02-09	1979-07-11	1995-01-01	2010-03-14	
Djibouti		2002-05-13				1995-05-31		
Dominica		1999-08-07				1995-01-01		
Dominican Republic		1997-12-24	1912-10-31	1983-05-08	1982-05-08	1995-03-09	2006-01-10	2018-09-05
Ecuador		1991-10-09	1914-04-27	1957-05-03	1991-09-06	1996-01-21	2002-03-06	2016-09-30
Egypt		1977-06-07				1995-06-30		
El Salvador		1994-02-19		1979-03-29	1979-03-29	1995-05-07	2002-03-06	2016-09-30
Equatorial Guinea		1997-06-26				Observer		
Eritrea								
Estonia		1994-10-26			1999-11-13	2010-03-14		
Eswatini		1998-12-14				1995-01-01		
Ethiopia						Observer		2021-02-02
European Union						1995-01-01	2010-03-14	2019-01-01
Fiji		1970-10-10 (Note: Declared the continue of application on 1971-12-01)		1972-03-13		1996-01-14		
Finland		1928-04-01		1963-04-16	1986-11-01	1995-01-01	2010-03-14	
France		1887-12-05		1956-01-14	1972-12-11	1995-01-01	2010-03-14	
Gabon		1962-03-26				1995-01-01	2002-03-06	
Gambia		1993-03-07				1996-10-23		
Georgia		1995-05-16				2000-06-14	2002-03-06	2025-02-26
Germany		1887-12-05		1955-09-16	1974-01-18	1995-01-01	2010-03-14	
Ghana		1991-10-11		1962-08-22		1995-01-01	2006-11-18	2018-08-11
Greece		1920-11-09		1963-08-24		1995-01-01	2010-03-14	
Grenada		1998-09-22				1996-02-22		
Guatemala		1997-07-28	1913-03-28	1964-10-28		1995-07-21	2003-02-04	2016-09-30
Guernsey		2014-11-21						2021-01-01
Guinea		1980-11-20		1981-11-13	1981-11-13	1995-10-25	2002-05-25	
Guinea-Bissau		1991-07-22				1995-05-31		
Guyana		1994-10-25		Unknown	Unknown	1995-01-01		
Haiti		1996-01-11	1919-11-27	1955-09-16		1996-01-30		
Honduras		1990-01-25	1914-04-27			1995-01-01	2002-05-20	2017-06-29
Hong Kong		1997-07-01 (Note: Was extended by United Kingdom on 1973-05-05, re-applied as a Special Administrative Region)		1997-09-30	1997-09-30	1995-01-01	2008-10-01	2022-05-05
Hungary		1922-02-14		1971-01-23	1974-07-10	1995-01-01	2002-03-06	
Iceland	Miðstöð Islenskra Bókmennta	1947-09-07		1956-12-18		1995-01-01		2022-03-09
India		1928-04-01 (Note: Declared the continue of application on 1928-04-23)		1958-01-21	1988-04-07	1995-01-01		2016-09-30
Indonesia		1997-09-05				1995-01-01	2002-03-06	2020-04-28
Iran						Observer		
Iraq						Observer		2024-07-23
Ireland		1927-10-05		1959-01-20		1995-01-01	2010-03-14	
Isle of Man		1996-03-18						2021-01-01
Israel		1950-03-24		1955-09-16		1995-04-21	Signed	2016-09-30
Italy		1887-12-05		1957-01-24	1980-01-25	1995-01-01	2010-03-14	
Jamaica		1994-01-01				1995-05-09	2002-06-12	2024-08-28
Japan		1899-07-15		1955-09-16	1977-10-21	1995-01-01	2002-03-06	2019-01-01
Jersey		2014-01-31						2021-01-01
Jordan		1999-07-28				2000-04-11	2004-04-27	2018-09-26
Kazakhstan		1999-04-12		1973-05-27		Observer	2004-11-12	2025-07-14
Kenya		1993-06-11		1966-09-07	1974-07-10	1995-01-01	Signed	2017-09-02
Kiribati		2018-01-02					2021-06-22	2019-10-31
Korea, Democratic People's Republic		2003-04-28					2024-04-30	2016-09-30
Korea, Republic		1996-08-21		1987-10-01	1987-10-01	1995-01-01	2004-06-24	2016-09-30
Kuwait		2014-12-02			1995-01-01			
Kyrgyzstan		1999-07-08				1998-12-20	2002-03-06	2017-08-15
Laos		2012-03-14		1955-09-16		2013-02-02		
Latvia		1995-08-11				1999-02-10	2002-03-06	
Lebanon		1947-09-30		1959-10-17		Observer		
Lesotho		1989-09-28				1995-05-31		2018-07-30
Liberia		1989-03-08		1956-07-27				2017-01-06
Libya		1976-09-28				Observer		
Liechtenstein		1931-07-30		1959-01-22	1999-11-11	1995-09-01	2007-04-30	2021-12-22
Lithuania		1994-12-14				2001-05-31	2002-03-06	
Luxembourg		1888-06-20		1955-10-15		1995-01-01	2010-03-14	
Macau		1999-12-20 (Note: Was extended by Portugal on 199-08-12, re-applied as a Special Administrative Region)				1995-01-01	2013-11-06	
Madagascar		1966-01-01 (Note: Declared the continue of application on 1966-02-11)				1995-11-17	2015-2-24	
Malawi		1991-10-12		1965-10-26		1995-05-31		2017-10-14
Malaysia		1990-10-01				1995-01-01	2012-12-27	2022-06-30
Maldives		2025-11-22				1995-05-31		
Mali		1962-03-19				1995-05-31	2002-04-24	2016-09-30
Malta		1964-09-21 (Note: Declared the continue of application on 1968-05-29)		1968-11-19		1995-01-01	2010-03-14	
Marshall Islands								2019-05-08
Mauritania		1973-02-06				1995-05-31		
Mauritius		1989-05-10		1970-11-20		1995-01-01		2021-04-11
Mexico		1967-06-11	1964-04-24	1957-05-12	1975-10-31	1995-01-01	2002-03-06	2016-09-30
Federated States of Micronesia		2003-10-07						
Moldova		1995-11-02				2001-07-26	2002-03-06	2018-05-19
Monaco		1889-05-30		1955-09-16	1974-12-13		Signed	
Mongolia		1998-03-12				1997-01-29	2002-10-25	2016-09-30
Montenegro		2006-06-03 (Note: Participated on 1893-07-01, before became a part of Yugoslavia, which became a party of Berne Union on 1930-06-17, resume an independent member on the date given, declared the continue of application on 2006-12-04)		1966-05-11 (as Yugoslavia)	1974-07-10 (as Yugoslavia)	2012-04-29	2003-06-13 (as Serbia and Montenegro)	2022-06-08
Morocco		1917-06-16			1976-01-28	1995-01-01	2011-07-20	2019-08-15
Mozambique		2013-11-22				1995-08-26		
Myanmar						1995-01-01		
Namibia		1990-03-21 (Note: Declared the continue of application on 1993-09-21)				1995-01-01	Signed	
Nauru		2020-05-11					2020-08-11	
Nepal		2006-01-11				2004-04-23		
Netherlands		1912-11-01		1967-06-22	1985-11-30	1995-01-01	2010-03-14	
New Zealand	https://www.iponz.govt.nz/	1928-04-24 (Note: Declared the continue of application on 1928-04-26)		1964-09-11	1964-09-11		1995-01-01	2020-01-04
Nicaragua		2000-08-23	1913-12-15	1961-08-16		1995-09-03	2003-03-06	2020-04-16
Niger		1960-08-03 (Note: Declared the continue of application on 1962-05-02)		1989-05-15	1989-05-15	1996-12-13		
Nigeria		1993-09-14		1962-02-14		1995-01-01	2018-01-04	2018-01-04
Niue		2016-09-24					2015-01-08	
North Macedonia		1991-09-08 (Note: Formerly a part of Yugoslavia, which became a party of Berne Union on 1930-06-17, became an independent member on the date given, declared the succession on 1993-07-23)		1966-05-11 (as Yugoslavia)	1974-07-10 (as Yugoslavia)	2003-04-04	2004-02-04	
Norway	Nasjonal Biblioteket	1896-04-13		1963-01-23	1974-08-07	1995-01-01		2021-11-30
Oman		1999-07-14				2000-11-09	2005-09-20	
Pakistan		1948-07-05		1955-09-16		1995-01-01		2024-06-12
Palau								
Panama		1996-06-08	1913-11-25	1962-10-17	1980-09-03	1997-09-06	2002-03-06	2017-05-10
Papua New Guinea						1996-06-09		
Paraguay		1992-01-02	1917-09-20	1962-03-11		1995-01-01	2002-03-06	2016-09-30
Peru		1988-08-20	1920-04-30	1963-10-16	1985-07-22	1995-01-01	2002-03-06	2016-09-30
Philippines	Intellectual Property Office of the Philippines (IPOPHL)	1951-08-01		1955-11-19		1995-01-01	2002-10-04	2019-03-18
Poland		1920-01-28		1977-03-09	1977-03-09	1995-07-01	2004-03-23	
Portugal		1911-03-29		1956-12-25	1981-07-30	1995-01-01	2010-03-14	
Qatar		2000-07-05				1996-01-13	2005-10-28	2019-01-24
Romania		1927-01-01				1995-01-01	2002-03-06	
Russia		1995-03-13		1973-05-27 (as the Soviet Union)	1994-12-09	2012-08-22	2009-02-05	2018-05-08
Rwanda		1984-03-01		1989-11-10	1989-11-10	1996-05-22		2022-01-25
Saint Kitts and Nevis		1995-04-09				1996-02-21		2024-10-08
Saint Lucia		1993-08-24				1995-01-01	2002-03-06	2020-09-11
Saint Vincent and the Grenadines		1995-08-29		1985-04-22	1985-04-22	1995-01-01	2023-07-06	2016-12-05
Samoa		2006-07-21				2012-05-10		
San Marino		2020-09-02					2020-09-02	2020-09-02
São Tomé and Príncipe		2016-06-14				Observer	2020-04-27	2021-01-15
Saudi Arabia		2004-03-11		1994-07-13	1994-07-13	2005-12-11		2019-02-21
Senegal		1962-08-25		1974-07-09	1974-07-09	1995-01-01	2002-05-18	
Serbia		1992-04-27 (Note: Formerly a part of Yugoslavia, which became a party of Berne Union on 1930-06-17, became an independent member on the date given, declared the continue of application on 2006-09-19)		1966-05-11 (as Yugoslavia)	1974-07-10 (as Yugoslavia)	Observer	2003-06-13 (as Serbia and Montenegro)	2020-05-24
Seychelles						2015-04-26		
Sierra Leone						1995-07-23		
Singapore		1998-12-21				1995-01-01	2005-04-17	2016-09-30
Slovakia		1993-01-01		1993-01-01	1960-01-06 (as Czechoslovakia)	1980-04-17 (as Czechoslovakia)	1995-01-01	
Slovenia		1991-06-25 (Note: Formerly a part of Yugoslavia, which became a party of Berne Union on 1930-06-17, became an independent member on the date given, declared the continue of application on 1992-06-12)		1930-06-17 (as Yugoslavia)	1966-05-11 (as Yugoslavia)	1974-07-10 (as Yugoslavia)	1995-07-30	
Solomon Islands		2019-07-04					1996-07-26	
Somalia						Observer		
South Africa		1928-10-03		1928-10-03			1995-01-01	
South Sudan						Observer		
Spain		1887-12-05		1887-12-05	1955-01-27	1974-07-10	1995-01-01	
Sri Lanka		1948-02-04 (Note: Declared the continue of application on 1959-07-20)		1984-01-25	1959-07-20	1984-01-25	1984-01-25	2017-01-05
Sudan		2000-12-28			2000-12-28			
Suriname		1977-02-23			1977-02-23			
Sweden		1904-08-01		1961-07-01	1974-07-10	1995-01-01	2010-03-14	
Switzerland		1887-12-05		1956-03-30	1993-09-21	1995-07-01	2008-07-01	2020-05-11
Syria		2004-06-11						
Taiwan						2002-01-01 (as "Chinese Taipei")		
Tajikistan		2000-03-09				2013-03-02	2009-04-05	2019-05-27
Tanzania		1994-07-25				1995-01-01		2020-07-08
Thailand		1931-07-17				1995-01-01	2002-10-13	2019-04-28
Timor-Leste					Observer	2024-08-30		
Togo		1975-04-30				1995-05-31	2003-05-21	
Tonga		2001-06-14				2007-07-27		
Trinidad and Tobago		1988-08-16		1988-08-19	1988-08-19	1995-03-01	2008-11-28	2020-01-04
Tunisia		1887-12-05		1969-06-19	1975-06-10	1995-03-29	2023-06-16	2016-12-07
Turkey		1952-01-01				1995-03-26	2008-11-28	
Turkmenistan		2016-05-29						2021-01-15
Tuvalu		2017-06-02					2014-06-04	
Uganda		2022-04-28				1995-01-01	2022-04-28	2018-07-23
Ukraine		1995-10-25		1994-01-17		2008-05-16	2002-03-06	2023-09-08
United Arab Emirates		2004-07-14				1996-04-10	2004-07-14	2016-09-30
United Kingdom	Intellectual Property Office	1887-12-05		1957-09-27	1974-07-10	1995-01-01	2010-03-14	2021-01-01
United States	United States Copyright Office	1989-03-01	1911-08-01	1955-09-16	1974-07-10	1995-01-01	2002-03-06	2019-05-08
Uruguay		1967-07-10	1919-05-11	1993-04-12	1993-04-12	1995-01-01	2009-06-05	2016-09-30
Uzbekistan		2005-04-19				Observer	2019-07-17	2022-06-07
Vanuatu		2012-12-27				2012-08-24	2020-08-06	2020-08-06
Holy See (Vatican City)		1935-09-12		1955-10-05	1980-05-06	Observer		
Venezuela		1982-12-30		1966-09-30	1996-04-11	1995-01-01	Signed	2020-01-02
Vietnam		2004-10-26				2007-01-11	2022-02-17	2023-03-06
Yemen		2008-07-14				2014-06-26		
Zambia		1992-01-02		1965-06-01		1995-01-01		
Zimbabwe		1980-04-18 (Note: Declared the succession on 1981-09-18)				1995-03-05		2019-12-12

== See also ==
- List of parties to international treaties protecting rights related to copyright
- List of parties to international patent treaties
