= List of parties to international treaties protecting rights related to copyright =

Below is a list of countries which have signed and ratified one or more international treaties protecting rights related to copyright. Related rights protect performers, producers of sound recordings (phonograms) and broadcasting organisations. In some countries these rights are known simply as copyright, while other countries distinguish them from authors' rights: in either case, their international protection is distinct from the protection of literary and artistic works under the Berne Convention and other treaties.

== Treaties ==
Short name	Long name	Place	Date (original signature)	Date (into force)
Rome	Rome Convention for the Protection of Performers, Producers of Phonograms and Broadcasting Organisations	Rome	1961-10-26	1964-05-18
Phonograms	Convention for the Protection of Producers of Phonograms Against Unauthorized Duplication of Their Phonograms (Geneva Phonograms Convention)	Geneva	1971-10-29	1973-04-17
Satellites	Convention Relating to the Distribution of Programme-Carrying Signals Transmitted by Satellite	Brussels	1974-05-21	1979-08-25
TRIPS	TRIPS Agreement	Marrakech	1994-04-15	1995-01-01
WPPT	WIPO Performances and Phonograms Treaty	Geneva	1996-12-20	2002-05-20
Beijing	Beijing Treaty on Audiovisual Performances	Beijing	2012-06-12	2020-04-28

In addition, a Protection of Broadcasts and Broadcasting Organizations Treaty has been proposed, but not yet signed.

As of August 2024, Eritrea, Marshall Islands, Palau, and WTO Observer countries Iran, Iraq, Ethiopia, Somalia, and South Sudan are not a party to any copyright convention.

== Maps ==
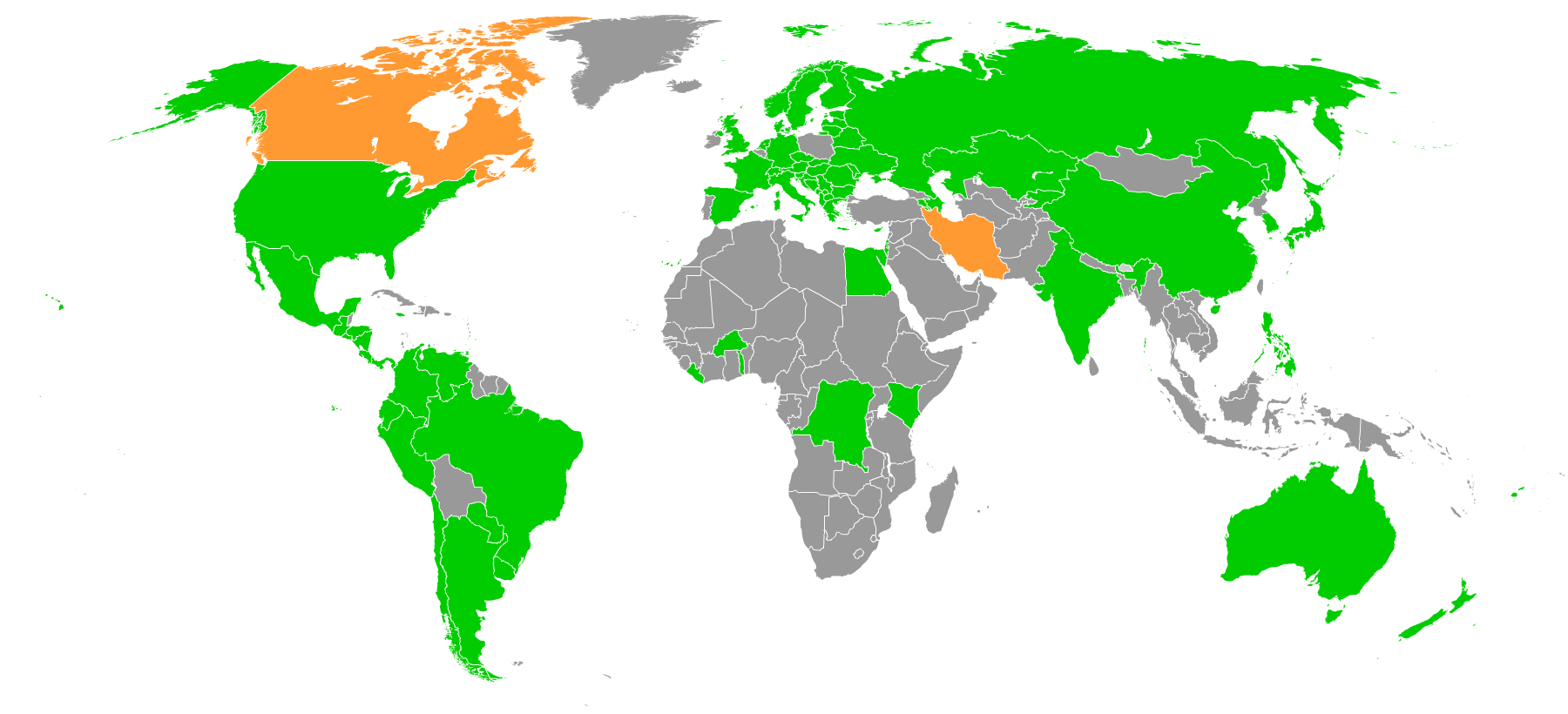
Geneva Phonograms Convention
Ratified
Signed but not ratified

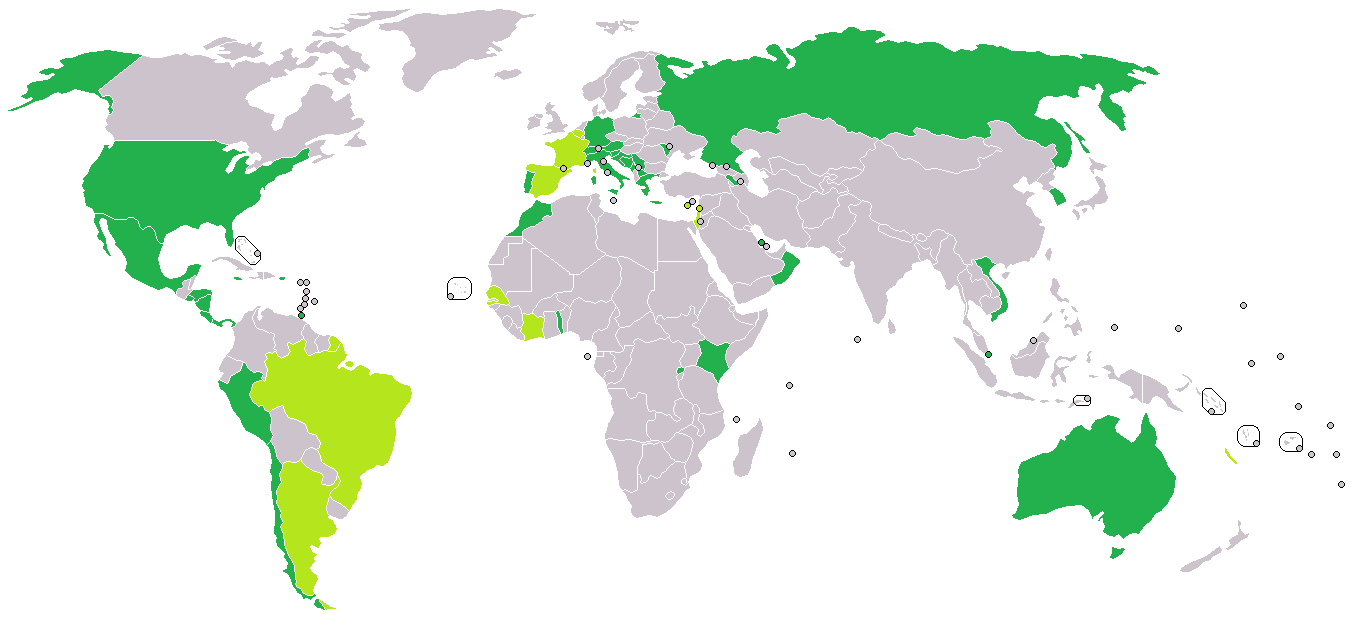
Satellites Convention
Ratified or acceded
Signed but not ratified

TRIPS
WTO members (where the TRIPS agreement applies)
Parties to the Agreement where also the membership of the European Union applies
Observers to the WTO

Beijing Treaty
Signatories to the Treaty

== List ==
The list below was taken from details supplied by WIPO and the WTO (see references): they are correct as of 2012-10-15, and include some accessions after that date. Dates quoted are the date on which the treaty came into effect for a given country.

Country		Rome	Phonograms	Satellites	TRIPS	WPPT	Beijing
(Afghanistan)	Afghanistan	—	—	—	2016-07-29	—	—
(Albania)	Albania	2000-09-01	2001-06-26	—	2000-09-08	2002-05-20	—
(Algeria)	Algeria	2007-04-22	—	—	observer	—	2017-07-25
(Andorra)	Andorra	2004-05-25	—	—	observer	—	—
(Angola)	Angola	—	—	—	1996-11-23	—	—
(Antigua and Barbuda)	Antigua and Barbuda	—	—	—	1995-01-01	—	—
(Argentina)	Argentina	1992-03-02	1973-06-30	—	1995-01-01	2002-05-20	—
(Armenia)	Armenia	2003-01-31	2003-01-31	1993-12-13	2003-02-05	2005-03-06	—
(Australia)	Australia	1992-09-30	1974-06-22	1990-10-26	1995-01-01	2007-07-26	—
(Austria)	Austria	1973-06-09	1982-08-21	1982-08-06	1995-01-01	2010-03-14	—
(Azerbaijan)	Azerbaijan	2005-10-08	2001-09-01	—	observer	2006-04-11	—
(The Bahamas)	Bahamas	—	—	—	observer	—	—
(Bahrain)	Bahrain	2006-01-18	—	2007-05-01	1995-01-01	2005-12-15	—
(Bangladesh)	Bangladesh	—	—	—	1995-01-01	—	—
(Barbados)	Barbados	1983-09-18	1983-07-29	—	1995-01-01	—	—
(Belarus)	Belarus	2003-05-27	2003-04-17	—	observer	—	—
(Belgium)	Belgium	1999-10-02	—	—	1995-01-01	2006-08-30	—
(Belize)	Belize	2018-11-01	—	—	1995-01-01	2018-11-01	2018-11-09
(Benin)	Benin	—	—	—	1996-02-22	2006-04-16	—
(Bhutan)	Bhutan	—	—	—	observer	—	—
(Bolivia)	Bolivia	1993-11-24	—	—	1995-09-12	—	—
(Bosnia and Herzegovina)	Bosnia and Herzegovina	2009-05-19	2009-05-25	1992-03-06	observer	2009-11-25	—
(Botswana)	Botswana	—	—	—	1995-05-31	2005-01-27	2013-11-20
(Brazil)	Brazil	1965-09-29	1975-11-28	—	1995-01-01	—	—
(Brunei)	Brunei	—	—	—	1995-01-01	—	—
(Bulgaria)	Bulgaria	1995-08-31	1995-09-06	—	1996-12-01	2002-05-20	—
(Burkina Faso)	Burkina Faso	1988-01-14	1988-01-30	—	1995-06-03	2002-05-20	2017-07-31
(Burundi)	Burundi	—	—	—	1995-07-23	—	—
(Cambodia)	Cambodia	—	—	—	2004-10-13	—	—
(Cameroon)	Cameroon	—	—	—	1995-12-13	—	—
(Canada)	Canada	1998-06-04	—	—	1995-01-01	—	—
(Cape Verde)	Cape Verde	1997-07-03	—	—	2008-07-23	—	—
(Central African Republic)	Central African Republic	—	—	—	1995-05-31	—	—
(Chad)	Chad	—	—	—	1996-10-19	—	—
(Chile)	Chile	1974-09-05	1977-03-24	2011-06-08	1995-01-01	2002-05-20	2015-06-22
(China)	China	—	1993-04-30	—	2001-12-11	2007-06-09	2014-07-04
(Colombia)	Colombia	1976-09-17	1994-05-16	—	1995-04-30	2002-05-20	—
(Comoros)	Comoros	—	—	—	2024-08-21	—	—
(Democratic Republic of the Congo)	Congo, Democratic Republic	—	1977-11-29	—	1997-01-01	—	—
(Republic of the Congo)	Congo, Republic	1964-05-18	—	—	1997-03-27	—	—
(Costa Rica)	Costa Rica	1971-09-09	1982-06-17	1999-06-25	1995-01-01	2002-05-20	—
(Ivory Coast)	Côte d'Ivoire	—	—	—	1995-01-01	—	—
(Croatia)	Croatia	2000-04-20	2000-04-20	1991-10-08	2000-11-30	2002-05-20	—
(Cuba)	Cuba	—	—	—	1995-04-20	—	—
(Cyprus)	Cyprus	2009-06-17	—	—	1995-07-30	2005-12-02	—
(Czech Republic)	Czech Republic	1993-01-01	1993-01-01	—	1995-01-01	2002-05-20	—
(Denmark)	Denmark	1965-09-23	1977-03-24	—	1995-01-01	2010-03-14	—
(Djibouti)	Djibouti	—	—	—	1995-05-31	—	—
(Dominica)	Dominica	1999-11-09	—	—	1995-01-01	—	—
(Dominican Republic)	Dominican Republic	1987-01-27	—	—	1995-03-09	2006-01-10	2018-06-05
(Ecuador)	Ecuador	1964-05-18	1974-09-14	—	1996-01-21	2002-05-20	—
(Egypt)	Egypt	—	—	—	1995-06-30	—	—
(El Salvador)	El Salvador	1979-06-29	1979-02-09	2008-07-22	1995-05-07	2002-05-20	2016-10-10
(Equatorial Guinea)	Equatorial Guinea	—	—	—	observer	—	—
(Eritrea)	Eritrea	—	—	—	—	—	—
(Estonia)	Estonia	2000-04-28	2000-05-28	—	1999-11-13	2010-03-14	—
(Ethiopia)	Ethiopia	—	—	—	observer	—	—
(Europe)	European Union	—	—	—	1995-01-01	2010-03-14	—
(Fiji)	Fiji	1972-04-11	1973-04-18	—	1996-01-14	—	—
(Finland)	Finland	1983-10-21	1973-04-18	—	1995-01-01	2010-03-14	—
(France)	France	1987-07-03	1973-04-18	—	1995-01-01	2010-03-14	—
(Gabon)	Gabon	—	—	—	1995-01-01	2002-05-20	2016-09-21
(The Gambia)	Gambia	—	—	—	1996-10-23	—	—
(Georgia (country))	Georgia	2004-08-14	—	—	2000-06-14	2002-05-20	—
(Germany)	Germany	1966-10-21	1974-05-18	1979-08-25	1995-01-01	2010-03-14	—
(Ghana)	Ghana	—	—	—	1995-01-01	—	—
(Greece)	Greece	1993-01-06	1994-02-09	1991-10-22	1995-01-01	2010-03-14	—
(Grenada)	Grenada	—	—	—	1996-02-22	—	—
(Guatemala)	Guatemala	1977-01-14	1977-02-01	—	1995-07-21	2003-01-08	—
(Guinea)	Guinea	—	—	—	1995-10-25	2002-05-25	—
(Guinea-Bissau)	Guinea-Bissau	—	—	—	1995-05-31	—	—
(Haiti)	Haiti	—	—	—	1996-01-30	—	—
(Honduras)	Honduras	1990-02-16	1990-03-06	2008-04-07	1995-01-01	2002-05-20	—
(Hong Kong)	Hong Kong	—	—	—	1995-01-01	2008-10-01	—
(Hungary)	Hungary	1995-02-10	1975-05-28	—	1995-01-01	2002-05-20	—
(Iceland)	Iceland	1994-06-15	—	—	1995-01-01	—	—
(India)	India	—	1975-02-12	—	1995-01-01	—	—
(Indonesia)	Indonesia	—	—	—	1995-01-01	2005-02-15	—
(Iran)	Iran	—	—	—	observer	—	—
(Iraq)	Iraq	—	—	—	observer	—	—
(Republic of Ireland)	Ireland	1979-09-19	—	—	1995-01-01	2010-03-14	—
(Israel)	Israel	2002-12-30	1978-05-01	—	1995-04-21	—	—
(Italy)	Italy	1975-04-08	1977-03-24	1981-07-07	1995-01-01	2010-03-14	—
(Jamaica)	Jamaica	1994-01-27	1994-01-11	2000-01-12	1995-05-09	2002-06-12	—
(Japan)	Japan	1989-10-26	1978-10-14	—	1995-01-01	2002-10-09	2014-06-10
(Jordan)	Jordan	—	—	—	2000-04-11	2004-05-24	—
(Kazakhstan)	Kazakhstan	—	2001-08-03	—	observer	2004-11-12	—
(Kenya)	Kenya	—	1976-04-21	1979-08-25	1995-01-01	—	—
(Kiribati)	Kiribati	—	—	—	—	—	—
(North Korea)	Korea, Democratic People's Republic	—	—	—	—	—	2016-02-19
(South Korea)	Korea, Republic	2009-03-18	1987-10-10	2012-03-19	1995-01-01	2009-03-18	—
(Kuwait)	Kuwait	—	—	—	1995-01-01	—	—
(Kyrgyzstan)	Kyrgyzstan	2003-08-13	2002-10-12	—	1998-12-20	2002-08-15	—
(Laos)	Laos	—	—	—	observer	—	—
(Latvia)	Latvia	1999-08-20	1997-08-23	—	1999-02-10	2002-05-20	—
(Lebanon)	Lebanon	1997-08-12	—	—	observer	—	—
(Lesotho)	Lesotho	1990-01-26	—	—	1995-05-31	—	—
(Liberia)	Liberia	—	2005-12-16	—	observer	—	—
(Libya)	Libya	—	—	—	observer	—	—
(Liechtenstein)	Liechtenstein	1999-10-12	1999-10-12	—	1995-09-01	2007-04-30	—
(Lithuania)	Lithuania	1999-07-22	2000-01-27	—	2001-05-31	2002-05-20	—
(Luxembourg)	Luxembourg	1976-02-25	1976-03-08	—	1995-01-01	2010-03-14	—
(Macau)	Macau	—	—	—	1995-01-01	—	—
(Madagascar)	Madagascar	—	—	—	1995-11-17	—	—
(Malawi)	Malawi	—	—	—	1995-05-31	—	—
(Malaysia)	Malaysia	—	—	—	1995-01-01	2012-12-27	—
(Maldives)	Maldives	—	—	—	1995-05-31	—	—
(Mali)	Mali	—	—	—	1995-05-31	2002-05-20	2018-10-23
(Malta)	Malta	—	—	—	1995-01-01	2010-03-14	—
(Mauritania)	Mauritania	—	—	—	1995-05-31	—	—
(Mauritius)	Mauritius	—	—	—	1995-01-01	—	—
(Mexico)	Mexico	1964-05-18	1973-12-21	1979-08-25	1995-01-01	2002-05-20	—
(Federated States of Micronesia)	Federated States of Micronesia	—	—	—	—	—	—
(Moldova)	Moldova	1995-12-05	2000-07-17	2008-10-28	2001-07-26	2002-05-20	2015-09-04
(Monaco)	Monaco	1985-12-06	1974-12-02	—	—	—	—
(Mongolia)	Mongolia	—	—	—	1997-01-29	2002-10-25	—
(Montenegro)	Montenegro	2006-06-03	2006-06-03	2006-06-03	2012-04-29	2006-06-03	—
(Morocco)	Morocco	—	—	1983-06-30	1995-01-01	2011-07-20	—
(Mozambique)	Mozambique	—	—	—	1995-08-26	—	—
(Myanmar)	Myanmar	—	—	—	1995-01-01	—	—
(Namibia)	Namibia	—	—	—	1995-01-01	—	—
(Nauru)	Nauru	—	—	—	—	—	—
(Nepal)	Nepal	—	—	—	2004-04-23	—	—
(Netherlands)	Netherlands	1993-10-07	1993-10-12	—	1995-01-01	2010-03-14	—
(New Zealand)	New Zealand	—	1976-08-13	—	1995-01-01	—	—
(Nicaragua)	Nicaragua	2000-08-10	2000-08-10	1979-08-25	1995-09-03	2003-03-06	—
(Niger)	Niger	1964-05-18	—	—	1996-12-13	—	—
(Nigeria)	Nigeria	1993-10-29	—	—	1995-01-01	—	2017-10-04
(North Macedonia)	North Macedonia	1998-03-02	1998-03-02	1991-11-17	2003-04-04	2005-03-20	—
(Norway)	Norway	1978-07-10	1978-08-01	—	1995-01-01	—	—
(Oman)	Oman	—	—	2008-03-18	2000-11-09	2005-09-20	—
(Pakistan)	Pakistan	—	—	—	1995-01-01	—	—
(Palau)	Palau	—	—	—	—	—	—
(Panama)	Panama	1983-09-02	1974-06-29	1985-09-25	1997-09-06	2002-05-20	—
(Papua New Guinea)	Papua New Guinea	—	—	—	1996-06-09	—	—
(Paraguay)	Paraguay	1970-02-26	1979-02-13	—	1995-01-01	2002-05-20	—
(Peru)	Peru	1985-08-07	1985-08-24	1985-08-07	1995-01-01	2002-07-18	2018-09-27
(Philippines)	Philippines	1984-09-25	—	—	1995-01-01	2002-10-04	—
(Poland)	Poland	1997-06-13	—	—	1995-07-01	2003-10-21	—
(Portugal)	Portugal	2002-07-17	—	1996-03-11	1995-01-01	2010-03-14	—
(Qatar)	Qatar	—	—	—	1996-01-13	2005-10-28	2015-07-03
(Romania)	Romania	1998-10-22	1998-10-01	—	1995-01-01	2002-05-20	—
(Russia)	Russia	2003-05-26	1995-03-13	1989-01-20	2012-08-22	2009-02-05	2015-10-19
(Rwanda)	Rwanda	—	—	2001-07-25	1996-05-22	—	—
(Saint Kitts and Nevis)	Saint Kitts and Nevis	—	—	—	1996-02-21	—	—
(Saint Lucia)	Saint Lucia	1996-08-17	2001-04-02	—	1995-01-01	2002-05-20	—
(Saint Vincent and the Grenadines)	St. Vincent & Grenadines	—	—	—	1995-01-01	2011-02-12	2016-09-05
(Samoa)	Samoa	—	—	—	2012-05-10	—	2017-05-09
(San Marino)	San Marino	—	—	—	—	—	—
(São Tomé and Príncipe)	São Tomé and Príncipe	—	—	—	—	—	—
(Saudi Arabia)	Saudi Arabia	—	—	—	2005-12-11	—	—
(Senegal)	Senegal	—	—	—	1995-01-01	2002-05-20	—
(Serbia)	Serbia	2003-06-10	2003-06-10	1992-04-27	observer	2003-06-13	—
(Seychelles)	Seychelles	—	—	—	observer	—	—
(Sierra Leone)	Sierra Leone	—	—	—	1995-07-23	—	—
(Singapore)	Singapore	—	—	2005-04-27	1995-01-01	2005-04-17	—
(Slovakia)	Slovakia	1993-01-01	1993-01-01	—	1995-01-01	2002-05-20	2014-05-22
(Slovenia)	Slovenia	1996-10-09	1996-10-15	1991-06-25	1995-07-30	2002-05-20	—
(Solomon Islands)	Solomon Islands	—	—	—	1996-07-26	—	—
(Somalia)	Somalia	—	—	—	observer	—	—
(South Africa)	South Africa	—	—	—	1995-01-01	—	—
(South Sudan)	South Sudan	—	—	—	—	—	—
(Spain)	Spain	1991-11-14	1974-08-24	—	1995-01-01	2010-03-14	—
(Sri Lanka)	Sri Lanka	—	—	—	1995-01-01	—	—
(Sudan)	Sudan	—	—	—	observer	—	—
(Suriname)	Suriname	—	—	—	1995-01-01	—	—
(Eswatini)	Swaziland	—	—	—	1995-01-01	—	—
(Sweden)	Sweden	1964-05-18	1973-04-18	—	1995-01-01	2010-03-14	—
(Switzerland)	Switzerland	1993-09-24	1993-09-30	1993-09-24	1995-07-01	2008-07-01	—
(Syria)	Syria	2006-05-13	—	—	observer	—	2013-03-18
(Taiwan)	Taiwan (Chinese Taipei)	—	—	—	2002-01-01	—	—
(Tajikistan)	Tajikistan	2008-05-19	—	—	observer	2011-08-24	—
(Tanzania)	Tanzania	—	—	—	1995-01-01	—	—
(Thailand)	Thailand	—	—	—	1995-01-01	—	—
(Timor-Leste)	Timor Leste	—	—	—	2024-08-30	—	—
(Togo)	Togo	2003-06-10	2003-06-10	2003-06-10	1995-05-31	2003-05-21	—
(Tonga)	Tonga	—	—	—	2007-07-27	—	—
(Trinidad and Tobago)	Trinidad and Tobago	—	1988-10-01	1996-11-01	1995-03-01	2008-11-28	—
(Tunisia)	Tunisia	—	—	—	1995-03-29	—	2016-07-21
(Turkey)	Turkey	2004-04-08	—	—	1995-03-26	2008-11-28	—
(Turkmenistan)	Turkmenistan	—	—	—	—	—	—
(Tuvalu)	Tuvalu	—	—	—	—	—	—
(Uganda)	Uganda	—	—	—	1995-01-01	—	—
(Ukraine)	Ukraine	2002-06-12	2000-02-18	—	2008-05-16	2002-05-20	—
(United Arab Emirates)	United Arab Emirates	2005-01-14	—	—	1996-04-10	2005-06-09	2014-10-15
(United Kingdom)	United Kingdom	1964-05-18	1973-04-18	—	1995-01-01	2010-03-14	—
(United States)	United States of America	—	1974-03-10	1985-03-07	1995-01-01	2002-05-20	—
(Uruguay)	Uruguay	1977-07-04	1983-01-18	—	1995-01-01	2008-08-28	—
(Uzbekistan)	Uzbekistan	—	—	—	observer	—	—
(Vanuatu)	Vanuatu	—	—	—	2012-08-24	—	—
(Vatican City)	Vatican City	—	1977-07-18	—	observer	—	—
(Venezuela)	Venezuela	1996-01-30	1982-11-18	—	1995-01-01	—	—
(Vietnam)	Vietnam	2007-03-01	2005-07-06	2006-01-12	2007-01-11	—	—
(Yemen)	Yemen	—	—	—	2014-06-26	—	—
(Zambia)	Zambia	—	—	—	1995-01-01	—	—
(Zimbabwe)	Zimbabwe	—	—	—	1995-03-05	—	—

== See also ==
- List of parties to international copyright agreements
- List of parties to international patent treaties

=== International organizations ===
- World Intellectual Property Organization
- World Trade Organization
- UNESCO
- International Labour Organization
