= List of parties to international patent treaties =

This is a list of parties to international patent treaties which are open to all states.

Paris
Paris Convention for the Protection of Industrial Property, Paris, 1883-03-20, came into force 1884-07-07
PCT
Patent Cooperation Treaty, Washington, 1970-06-19, came into force 1978-01-24
Budapest
Budapest Treaty on the International Recognition of the Deposit of Microorganisms for the Purposes of Patent Procedure, Budapest, 1977-04-28, came into force 1980-08-19
TRIPS
Agreement on Trade-Related Aspects of Intellectual Property Rights, Marrakech, 1994-04-15, came into force 1995-01-01
PLT
Patent Law Treaty, Geneva, 2000-06-01, came into force 2005-04-28

The list below was taken from details supplied by WIPO and the WTO. Dates quoted are the date on which the treaty came into effect for a given country.

Country		Paris	PCT	Budapest	TRIPS	PLT
(Afghanistan)	Afghanistan	2017-05-14	—	—	—	—
(Albania)	Albania	1995-10-04	1995-10-04	2003-09-19	2000-09-08	2010-05-17
(Algeria)	Algeria	1966-03-01	2000-03-08	—	—	—
(Andorra)	Andorra	2004-06-02	—	—	—	—
(Angola)	Angola	2007-12-27	2007-12-27	—	1996-11-23	—
(Antigua and Barbuda)	Antigua and Barbuda	2000-03-17	2000-03-17	2019-06-25	1995-01-01	—
(Argentina)	Argentina	1967-02-10	—	—	1995-01-01	—
(Armenia)	Armenia	1991-12-25 (Note: Ratification as the Soviet Union; states except Russian Federation declared continue application during the dissolution of the USSR)	1991-12-25	2005-03-06	2003-02-05	2013-09-17
(Australia)	Australia	1925-10-10	1980-03-31	1987-07-07	1995-01-01	2009-03-16
(Austria)	Austria	1909-01-01 (Note: Ratification as Austria-Hungary)	1979-04-23	1984-04-26	1995-01-01	—
(Azerbaijan)	Azerbaijan	1995-12-25	1995-12-25	2003-10-14	—	—
(The Bahamas)	Bahamas	1973-07-10	—	—	—	—
(Bahrain)	Bahrain	1997-10-29	2007-03-18	2012-11-20	1995-01-01	2005-12-15
(Bangladesh)	Bangladesh	1991-03-03	—	—	1995-01-01	—
(Barbados)	Barbados	1985-03-12	1985-03-12	—	1995-01-01	—
(Belarus)	Belarus	1991-12-25	1991-12-25	2001-10-19	—	2016-10-21
(Belgium)	Belgium	1884-07-07	1981-12-14	1983-12-15	1995-01-01	—
(Belize)	Belize	2000-06-17	2000-06-17	—	1995-01-01	—
(Benin)	Benin	1967-01-10	1987-02-26	—	1996-02-22	—
(Bhutan)	Bhutan	2000-08-04	—	—	—	—
(Bolivia)	Bolivia	1993-11-04	—	—	1995-09-12	—
(Bosnia and Herzegovina)	Bosnia and Herzegovina	1992-03-01	1996-09-07	2009-01-27	—	2012-05-09
(Botswana)	Botswana	1998-04-15	2003-10-30	—	1995-05-31	—
(Brazil)	Brazil	1884-07-07	1978-04-09	—	1995-01-01	—
(Brunei)	Brunei	2012-02-17	2012-07-24	2012-07-24	1995-01-01	—
(Bulgaria)	Bulgaria	1921-06-13	1984-05-21	1980-08-19	1996-12-01	—
(Burkina Faso)	Burkina Faso	1963-11-19	1989-03-21	—	1995-06-03	—
(Burundi)	Burundi	1977-09-03	—	—	1995-07-23	—
(Cambodia)	Cambodia	1998-09-22	2016-12-08	—	2004-10-13	—
(Cameroon)	Cameroon	1964-05-10	1978-01-24	—	1995-12-13	—
(Canada)	Canada	1923-09-01	1990-01-02	1996-09-21	1995-01-01	—
(Cape Verde)	Cape Verde	2022-07-06	2022-07-06	—	2008-07-23	—
(Central African Republic)	Central African Republic	1963-11-19	1978-01-24	—	1995-05-31	—
(Chad)	Chad	1963-11-19	1978-01-24	—	1996-10-19	—
(Chile)	Chile	1991-06-14	2009-06-02	2011-08-05	1995-01-01	—
(China)	China	1985-03-19	1994-01-01	1995-07-01	2001-12-11	—
(Colombia)	Colombia	1996-09-03	2001-02-28	2016-07-26	1995-04-30	—
(Comoros)	Comoros	2005-04-03	2005-04-03	—	—	—
(Democratic Republic of the Congo)	Congo, Democratic Republic	1975-01-31	—	—	1997-01-01	—
(Republic of the Congo)	Congo, Republic	1963-09-02	1978-01-24	—	1997-03-27	—
(Costa Rica)	Costa Rica	1995-10-31	1999-08-03	2008-09-30	1995-01-01	—
(Ivory Coast)	Côte d'Ivoire	1963-10-23	1991-04-30	—	1995-01-01	—
(Croatia)	Croatia	1991-10-08	1998-07-01	2000-02-25	2000-11-30	2005-04-28
(Cuba)	Cuba	1904-11-17	1996-07-16	1994-02-19	1995-04-20	—
(Cyprus)	Cyprus	1966-01-17	1998-04-01	—	1995-07-30	—
(Czech Republic)	Czech Republic	1993-01-01	1993-01-01	1993-01-01	1995-01-01	—
(Denmark)	Denmark	1894-10-01	1978-12-01	1985-07-01	1995-01-01	2005-04-28
(Djibouti)	Djibouti	2002-05-13	2016-09-23	—	1995-05-31	—
(Dominica)	Dominica	1999-08-07	1999-08-07	—	1995-01-01	—
(Dominican Republic)	Dominican Republic	1890-07-11	2007-05-28	2007-07-03	1995-03-09	—
(Ecuador)	Ecuador	1999-06-22	2001-05-07	—	1996-01-21	—
(Egypt)	Egypt	1951-07-01	2003-09-06	—	1995-06-30	—
(El Salvador)	El Salvador	1994-02-19	2006-08-17	2006-08-17	1995-05-07	—
(Equatorial Guinea)	Equatorial Guinea	1997-06-26	2001-07-17	—	—	—
(Eritrea)	Eritrea	—	—	—	—	—
(Ethiopia)	Ethiopia	2025-08-15	—	—	—	—
(Estonia)	Estonia	1994-08-24 (Note: Estonia was a member of the Paris Convention from 1924-02-12. However, it lost its independence on 1940-08-06.)	1994-08-24	1996-09-14	1999-11-13	2005-04-28
(Eswatini)	Eswatini	1991-05-12	1994-09-20	—	1995-01-01	—
(Europe)	European Union	—	—	—	1995-01-01	—
(Fiji)	Fiji	2024-01-19	—	—	1996-01-14	—
(Finland)	Finland	1921-09-20	1980-10-01	1985-09-01	1995-01-01	2006-03-06
(France)	France	1884-07-07	1978-02-25	1980-08-19	1995-01-01	2010-01-05
(Gabon)	Gabon	1964-02-29	1978-01-24	—	1995-01-01	—
(The Gambia)	Gambia	1992-01-21	1997-12-09	—	1996-10-23	—
(Georgia (country))	Georgia	1991-12-25	1991-12-25	2005-09-30	2000-06-14	—
(Germany)	Germany	1903-05-01	1978-01-24	1981-01-20	1995-01-01	—
(Ghana)	Ghana	1976-09-28	1997-02-26	—	1995-01-01	—
(Greece)	Greece	1924-10-02	1990-10-09	1993-10-30	1995-01-01	—
(Grenada)	Grenada	1998-09-22	1998-09-22	—	1996-02-22	—
(Guatemala)	Guatemala	1998-08-18	2006-10-14	2006-10-14	1995-07-21	—
(Guinea)	Guinea	1982-02-05	1991-05-27	—	1995-10-25	—
(Guinea-Bissau)	Guinea-Bissau	1988-06-28	1997-12-12	—	1995-05-31	—
(Guyana)	Guyana	1994-10-25	—	—	1995-01-01	—
(Haiti)	Haiti	1958-07-01	—	—	1996-01-30	—
(Honduras)	Honduras	1994-02-04	2006-06-20	2006-06-20	1995-01-01	—
(Hong Kong)	Hong Kong, China	1997-07-01 (Note: Ratification of China extended to Hong Kong)	1997-07-01	—	1995-01-01	—
(Hungary)	Hungary	1909-01-01	1980-06-27	1980-08-19	1995-01-01	2008-03-12
(Iceland)	Iceland	1962-05-05	1995-03-23	1995-03-23	1995-01-01	—
(India)	India	1998-12-07	1998-12-07	2001-12-17	1995-01-01	—
(Indonesia)	Indonesia	1950-12-24	1997-09-05	—	1995-01-01	—
(Iran)	Iran	1959-12-16	2013-10-04	—	—	—
(Iraq)	Iraq	1976-12-24	2022-04-30	—	—	—
(Republic of Ireland)	Ireland	1925-12-04	1992-08-01	1999-12-15	1995-01-01	2012-05-27
(Israel)	Israel	1950-03-24	1996-06-01	1996-04-26	1995-04-21	—
(Italy)	Italy	1884-07-07	1985-03-28	1986-03-23	1995-01-01	—
(Jamaica)	Jamaica	1999-12-24	2022-02-10	—	1995-05-09	—
(Japan)	Japan	1899-07-15	1978-10-01	1980-08-19	1995-01-01	—
(Jordan)	Jordan	1972-07-17	2017-06-09	2008-11-14	2000-04-11	—
(Kazakhstan)	Kazakhstan	1991-12-25	1991-12-25	2002-04-24	—	2011-10-19
(Kenya)	Kenya	1965-06-14	1994-06-08	—	1995-01-01	—
(Kiribati)	Kiribati	2022-02-05	—	—	—	—
(North Korea)	Korea, Democratic People's Republic	1980-06-10	1980-07-08	2002-02-21	—	—
(South Korea)	Korea, Republic	1980-05-04	1984-08-10	1988-03-28	1995-01-01	—
(Kuwait)	Kuwait	2014-12-02	2016-09-09	—	1995-01-01	—
(Kyrgyzstan)	Kyrgyzstan	1991-12-25	1991-12-25	2003-05-17	1998-12-20	2005-04-28
(Laos)	Laos	1998-10-08	2006-06-14	—	2013-02-02	—
(Latvia)	Latvia	1993-09-07 (Note: Latvia was a member of the Paris Convention from 1925-08-20. However, it lost its independence on 1940-07-21.)	1993-09-07	1994-12-29	1999-02-10	2010-06-12
(Lebanon)	Lebanon	1924-09-01	—	—	—	—
(Lesotho)	Lesotho	1989-09-28	1995-10-21	—	1995-05-31	—
(Liberia)	Liberia	1994-08-27	1994-08-27	—	—	2017-01-04
(Libya)	Libya	1976-09-28	2005-09-15	—	—	—
(Liechtenstein)	Liechtenstein	1933-07-14	1980-03-19	1981-08-19	1995-09-01	2009-12-18
(Lithuania)	Lithuania	1994-05-22	1994-07-05	1998-05-09	2001-05-31	2012-02-03
(Luxembourg)	Luxembourg	1922-06-30	1978-04-30	2010-07-29	1995-01-01	—
(Macau)	Macau, China	1999-12-20 (Note: Ratification of China extended to Macao)	—	—	1995-01-01	—
(Madagascar)	Madagascar	1963-12-21	1978-01-24	—	1995-11-17	—
(Malawi)	Malawi	1964-07-06	1978-01-24	—	1995-05-31	—
(Malaysia)	Malaysia	1989-01-01	2006-08-16	2022-06-30	1995-01-01	—
(Maldives)	Maldives	—	—	—	1995-05-31	—
(Mali)	Mali	1983-03-01	1984-10-19	—	1995-05-31	—
(Malta)	Malta	1967-10-20	2007-03-01	—	1995-01-01	—
(Mauritania)	Mauritania	1965-04-11	1983-04-13	—	1995-05-31	—
(Mauritius)	Mauritius	1976-09-24	2023-03-15	—	1995-01-01	—
(Mexico)	Mexico	1903-09-07	1995-01-01	2001-03-21	1995-01-01	—
(Federated States of Micronesia)	Federated States of Micronesia	—	—	—	—	—
(Moldova)	Moldova	1991-12-25	1991-12-25	1991-12-25	2001-07-26	2005-04-28
(Monaco)	Monaco	1956-04-29	1979-06-22	1999-01-23	—	—
(Mongolia)	Mongolia	1985-04-21	1991-05-27	—	1997-01-29	—
(Montenegro)	Montenegro	2006-06-03	2006-06-03	2006-06-03	2012-04-29	2012-03-09
(Morocco)	Morocco	1917-07-30	1999-10-08	2011-07-20	1995-01-01	—
(Mozambique)	Mozambique	1998-07-09	2000-05-18	—	1995-08-26	—
(Myanmar)	Myanmar	—	—	—	1995-01-01	—
(Namibia)	Namibia	2004-01-01	2004-01-01	—	1995-01-01	—
(Nauru)	Nauru	—	—	—	—	—
(Nepal)	Nepal	2001-06-22	—	—	2004-04-23	—
(Netherlands)	Netherlands	1884-07-07 (Note: Valid in all countries in the Kingdom: Aruba, Curaçao, Netherlands and Sint Maarten)	1979-07-10	1987-07-02	1995-01-01	2010-10-27 (Note: Valid in all countries in the Kingdom, except Aruba)
(New Zealand)	New Zealand	1931-07-29 (Note: Extended to the Cook Islands, Niue and Tokelau)	1992-12-01	2019-03-17	1995-01-01	—
(Nicaragua)	Nicaragua	1996-07-03	2003-03-06	2006-08-10	1995-09-03	—
(Niger)	Niger	1964-07-05	1993-03-21	—	1996-12-13	—
(Nigeria)	Nigeria	1963-09-02	2005-05-08	—	1995-01-01	2005-04-28
(North Macedonia)	North Macedonia	1991-09-08	1995-08-10	2002-08-30	2003-04-04	2010-04-22
(Norway)	Norway	1885-07-01	1980-01-01	1986-01-01	1995-01-01	—
(Oman)	Oman	1999-07-14	2001-10-26	2007-10-16	2000-11-09	2007-10-16
(Pakistan)	Pakistan	2004-07-22	—	—	1995-01-01	—
(Palau)	Palau	—	—	—	—	—
(Panama)	Panama	1996-10-19	2012-09-07	2012-09-07	1997-09-06	—
(Papua New Guinea)	Papua New Guinea	1999-06-15	2003-06-14	—	1996-06-09	—
(Paraguay)	Paraguay	1994-05-28	—	—	1995-01-01	—
(Peru)	Peru	1995-04-11	2009-06-06	2009-01-20	1995-01-01	—
(Philippines)	Philippines	1965-09-27	2001-08-17	1981-10-21	1995-01-01	—
(Poland)	Poland	1919-11-10	1990-12-25	1993-09-22	1995-07-01	—
(Portugal)	Portugal	1884-07-07	1992-11-24	1997-10-16	1995-01-01	—
(Qatar)	Qatar	2000-07-05	2011-08-03	2014-03-06	1996-01-13	—
(Romania)	Romania	1920-10-06	1979-07-23	1999-09-25	1995-01-01	2005-04-28
(Russia)	Russian Federation	1965-07-01	1978-03-29	1981-04-22	2012-08-22	2009-08-12
(Rwanda)	Rwanda	1984-03-01	2011-08-31	—	1996-05-22	—
(Saint Kitts and Nevis)	Saint Kitts and Nevis	1995-04-09	2005-10-27	—	1996-02-21	—
(Saint Lucia)	Saint Lucia	1995-06-09	1996-10-30	—	1995-01-01	—
(Saint Vincent and the Grenadines)	St. Vincent & Grenadines	1995-08-29	2002-08-06	—	1995-01-01	—
(Samoa)	Samoa	2013-09-21	2020-01-02	—	2012-05-10	—
(San Marino)	San Marino	1960-03-04	2004-12-14	—	—	—
(São Tomé and Príncipe)	São Tomé and Príncipe	1998-05-12	2008-07-03	—	—	—
(Saudi Arabia)	Saudi Arabia	2004-03-11	2013-08-03	2021-01-16	2005-12-11	2013-08-03
(Senegal)	Senegal	1963-12-21	1978-01-24	—	1995-01-01	—
(Serbia)	Serbia	1992-04-27 (Note: Ratification as Serbia and Montenegro)	1997-01-02	1994-02-25	—	2010-10-20
(Seychelles)	Seychelles	2002-11-07	2002-11-07	—	—	—
(Sierra Leone)	Sierra Leone	1997-06-17	1997-06-17	—	1995-07-23	—
(Singapore)	Singapore	1995-02-23	1995-02-23	1995-02-23	1995-01-01	—
(Slovakia)	Slovakia	1993-01-01	1993-01-01	1993-01-01	1995-01-01	2005-04-28
(Slovenia)	Slovenia	1991-06-25	1994-03-01	1998-03-12	1995-07-30	2005-04-28
(Solomon Islands)	Solomon Islands	—	—	—	1996-07-26	—
(Somalia)	Somalia	—	—	—	—	—
(South Africa)	South Africa	1947-12-01	1999-03-16	1997-07-14	1995-01-01	—
(South Sudan)	South Sudan	—	—	—	—	—
(Spain)	Spain	1884-07-07	1989-11-16	1981-03-19	1995-01-01	2013-11-06
(Sri Lanka)	Sri Lanka	1952-12-29	1982-02-26	—	1995-01-01	—
(Sudan)	Sudan	1984-04-16	1984-04-16	—	—	—
(Suriname)	Suriname	1975-11-25	—	—	1995-01-01	—
(Sweden)	Sweden	1885-07-01	1978-05-17	1983-10-01	1995-01-01	2007-12-27
(Switzerland)	Switzerland	1884-07-07	1978-01-24	1981-08-09	1995-07-01	2008-07-01
(Syria)	Syria	1924-09-01	2003-06-26	—	—	—
(Taiwan)	Taiwan (Republic of China)	—	—	—	2002-01-01	—
(Tajikistan)	Tajikistan	1991-12-25	1991-12-25	1991-12-25	2013-03-02	—
(Tanzania)	Tanzania	1963-06-16	1999-09-14	—	1995-01-01	—
(Thailand)	Thailand	2008-05-02	2009-09-24	—	1995-01-01	—
(Timor-Leste)	Timor Leste	—	—	—	—	—
(Togo)	Togo	1967-09-10	1978-01-24	—	1995-05-31	—
(Tonga)	Tonga	2001-06-14	—	—	2007-07-27	—
(Trinidad and Tobago)	Trinidad and Tobago	1964-08-01	1994-03-10	1994-03-10	1995-03-01	—
(Tunisia)	Tunisia	1884-07-07	2001-12-10	2004-05-23	1995-03-29	—
(Turkey)	Turkey	1925-10-10	1996-01-01	1998-11-30	1995-03-26	—
(Turkmenistan)	Turkmenistan	1991-12-25	1991-12-25	—	—	—
(Tuvalu)	Tuvalu	—	—	—	—	—
(Uganda)	Uganda	1965-06-14	1995-02-09	—	1995-01-01	—
(Ukraine)	Ukraine	1991-12-25	1991-12-25	1997-07-02	2008-05-16	2005-04-28
(United Arab Emirates)	United Arab Emirates	1996-09-19	1999-03-10	2021-05-17	1996-04-10	—
(United Kingdom)	United Kingdom	1884-07-07 (Note: Extended to the Isle of Man (1983), Guernsey (from November 2020), Bailiwick of Jersey (from November 2020) and Gibraltar (from January 2021).)	1978-01-24 (Note: Extended to the Isle of Man (from 29 October 1983), Hong Kong (1981-1997), Gibraltar (from 1 January 2021) and Guernsey (from 23 March 2021))	1980-12-29 (Note: Extended to Guernsey, the Isle of Man and Gibraltar from 1 January 2021.)	1995-01-01 (Note: Extended to the Isle of Man)	2006-03-22
(United States)	United States of America	1887-05-30	1978-01-24	1980-08-19	1995-01-01	2013-12-18
(Uruguay)	Uruguay	1967-03-18	2025-01-07	—	1995-01-01	—
(Uzbekistan)	Uzbekistan	1991-12-25	1991-12-25	2002-01-12	—	2006-07-19
(Vanuatu)	Vanuatu	—	—	—	2012-08-24	—
(Vatican City)	Holy See (Vatican City)	1960-09-29	—	—	—	—
(Venezuela)	Venezuela	1995-09-12	—	—	1995-01-01	—
(Vietnam)	Vietnam	1949-03-08	1993-03-10	2021-06-01	2007-01-11	—
(Yemen)	Yemen	2007-02-15	—	—	—	—
(Zambia)	Zambia	1965-04-06	2001-11-15	—	1995-01-01	—
(Zimbabwe)	Zimbabwe	1980-04-18	1997-06-11	—	1995-03-05	—

== See also ==
- African Regional Intellectual Property Organization (ARIPO)
- Eurasian Patent Organization (EAPO)
- European Patent Organisation (EPO)
- World Intellectual Property Organization (WIPO)
- World Trade Organization (WTO)
- List of parties to international copyright treaties
- List of parties to international related rights treaties
