= Convention Relating to the Distribution of Programme-Carrying Signals Transmitted by Satellite =

1974 United Nations treaty

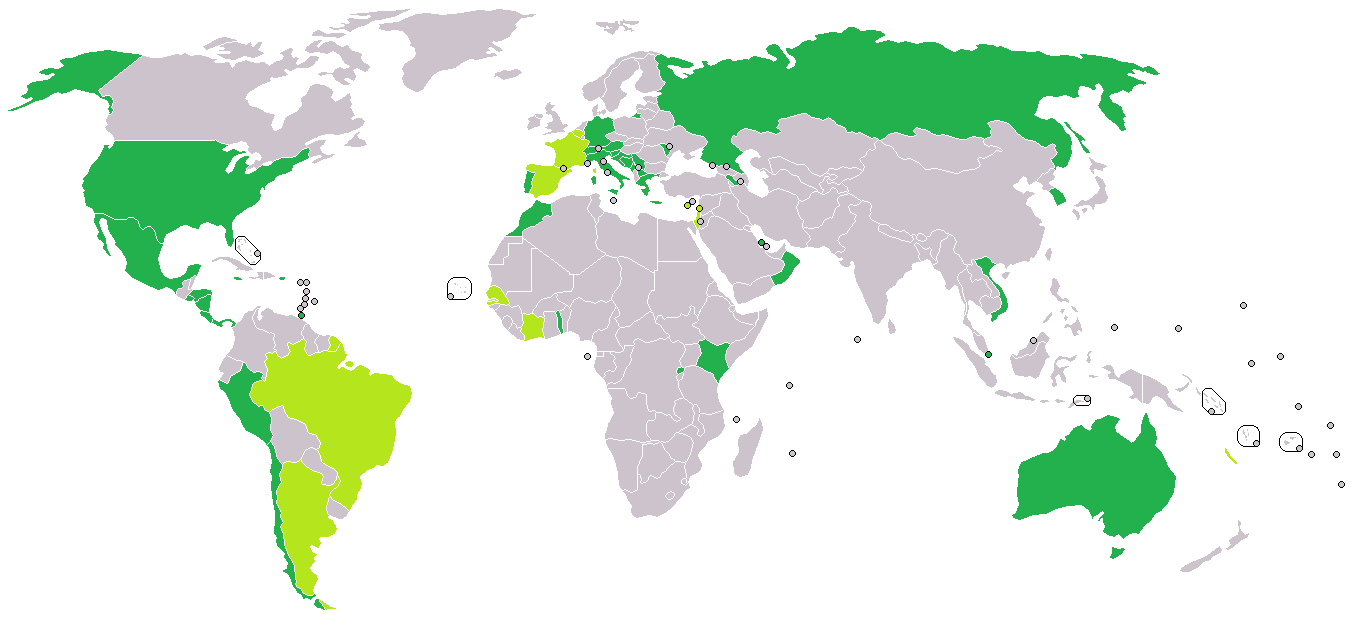
ratified signed, but not yet ratified

The Convention Relating to the Distribution of Programme-Carrying Signals Transmitted by Satellite was opened for signature on 21 May 1974 in Brussels and entered into force on 25 August 1979. It is overseen by the United Nations Committee on the Peaceful Uses of Outer Space.

== Provisions ==
Convention provides for the obligation of each Contracting State to take adequate measures to prevent the unauthorized distribution on or from its territory of any programme-carrying signal transmitted by satellite.

== Membership ==
As of 2025, the convention has been ratified by 40 states, there are 10 states signed the convention but not yet ratified.

== List of parties ==
Participant	Signature	Ratification	Accession	Succession	Entry into force
Argentina	Mar 26, 1975				
Armenia			Sep 13, 1993		Dec 13, 1993
Australia			Jul 26, 1990		Oct 26, 1990
Austria	Mar 26, 1975	May 6, 1982			Aug 6, 1982
Bahrain			Feb 1, 2007		May 1, 2007
Belgium	May 21, 1974				
Benin			May 18, 2017		Aug 18, 2017
Bosnia and Herzegovina				Jan 12, 1994	Mar 6, 1992
Brazil	May 21, 1974				
Canada			Mar 27, 2024		Jun 27, 2024
Chile			Mar 8, 2011		Jun 8, 2011
Colombia			Dec 20, 2013		Mar 20, 2014
Costa Rica			Mar 25, 1999		Jun 25, 1999
Côte d'Ivoire	May 21, 1974				
Croatia				Jul 26, 1993	Oct 8, 1991
Cyprus	May 21, 1974				
El Salvador			Apr 22, 2008		Jul 22, 2008
France	Mar 27, 1975				
Germany	May 21, 1975	May 25, 1979			Aug 25, 1979
Greece			Jul 22, 1991		Oct 22, 1991
Honduras			Jan 7, 2008		Apr 7, 2008
Israel	May 21, 1974				
Italy	May 21, 1974	Apr 7, 1981			Jul 7, 1981
Jamaica			Oct 12, 1999		Jan 12, 2000
Kenya	May 21, 1974	Jan 6, 1976			Aug 25, 1979
Lebanon	May 21, 1974				
Mexico	May 21, 1974	Mar 18, 1976			Aug 25, 1979
Montenegro				Oct 23, 2006	Jun 3, 2006
Morocco	May 21, 1974	Mar 31, 1983			Jun 30, 1983
Nicaragua			Dec 1, 1975		Aug 25, 1979
North Macedonia				Sep 2, 1997	Nov 17, 1991
Oman			Dec 18, 2007		Mar 18, 2008
Panama			Jun 25, 1985		Sep 25, 1985
Peru			May 7, 1985		Aug 7, 1985
Portugal			Dec 11, 1995		Mar 11, 1996
Qatar			Apr 12, 2023		Jul 12, 2023
South Korea			Dec 19, 2011		Mar 19, 2012
Republic of Moldova			Jul 28, 2008		Oct 28, 2008
Russian Federation			Oct 20, 1988		Jan 20, 1989
Rwanda			Apr 25, 2001		Jul 25, 2001
Senegal	May 21, 1974				
Serbia				Jun 14, 2001	Apr 27, 1992
Singapore			Jan 27, 2005		Apr 27, 2005
Slovenia				Nov 3, 1992	Jun 25, 1991
Spain	May 21, 1974				
Switzerland	May 21, 1974	Jun 24, 1993			Sep 24, 1993
Togo			Mar 10, 2003		Jun 10, 2003
Trinidad and Tobago			Aug 1, 1996		Nov 1, 1996
United States of America	May 21, 1974	Dec 7, 1984			Mar 7, 1985
Viet Nam			Oct 12, 2005		Jan 12, 2006

== See also ==
- List of parties to the Convention Relating to the Distribution of Programme-Carrying Signals Transmitted by Satellite
