= Geneva Phonograms Convention =

1971 international copyright treaty

Convention for the Protection of Producers of Phonograms Against Unauthorized Duplication of Their Phonograms
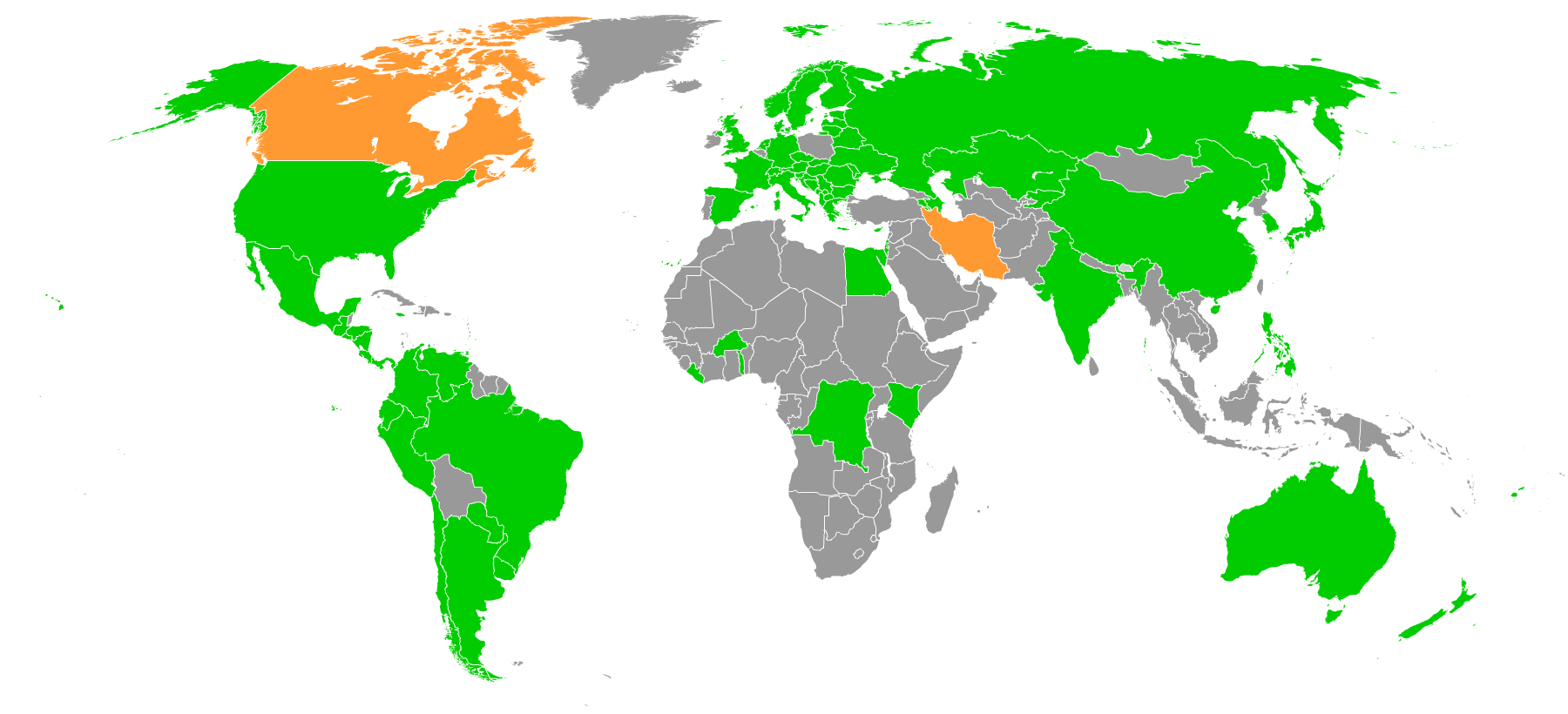
- Ratifications of the Convention (countries in orange have signed, but not ratified)
- Signed: 29 October 1971
- Location: Geneva
- Effective: 18 April 1973
- Condition: 5 ratifications
- Signatories: 32
- Parties: 79
- Depositary: Secretary–General of the United Nations
- Citations: 25 U.S.T. 309; T.I.A.S. 7808; 866 U.N.T.S. 67
- Languages: English, French, Russian and Spanish

Full text
- Convention for the Protection of Producers of Phonograms Against Unauthorized Duplication of Their Phonograms at Wikisource

The Convention for the Protection of Producers of Phonograms Against Unauthorized Duplication of Their Phonograms, also known as the Geneva Phonograms Convention, is a 1971 international agreement relating to copyright protection for sound recordings.

== Legal context ==
By the mid-1950s, the Berne Convention for the Protection of Literary and Artistic Works, the Buenos Aires Convention and Universal Copyright Convention granted strong rights to creators of printed or artistic content – and also to composers and performers of music – in most first world countries. The publisher of a book could prosecute a maker of unauthorized copies even if they operated in a different country. But there was no equivalent protection for sound recordings.

The 1961 Rome Convention for the first time granted international recognition for copyright in sound recordings. Now music labels were recognized as having a copyright interest in the recording itself, separately from the composer and performer. This gave them standing to prosecute makers of unauthorized copies of their tapes or records in other countries.

== Technological context ==
In the mid-1960s music labels began producing pre-recorded compact cassettes, a technology developed in the late 1950s which offered relatively compact players and space-efficient storage compared to vinyl records. It was also very much cheaper and simpler to make unauthorized copies compared to vinyl records. By the late 1960s copyright infringement and counterfeiting of these recordings had become common, and the music industry lobbied for a new international treaty which would give them additional powers to combat copyright infringement.

== The 1971 convention ==
The 1971 convention granted record producers the international right to block imports of counterfeit music recordings, and to take action against distributors and retailers who sold them.

== Specific requirement for protection ==
Unlike the Berne Convention, which does not require formalities to obtain protection, the Geneva Phonograms convention does provide one formality. To secure protection under this convention, copies of the sound recording must carry a copyright notice, one exclusively for sound recordings. The notice consists of the phonogram copyright symbol, "℗" which is the upper case letter "P" in a circle, the year of publication, and the copyright owner's name. In this way, the Geneva Phonograms Convention is similar to the notice requirement of the Universal Copyright Convention.

== See also ==
- List of parties to international treaties protecting rights related to copyright
- Sound recording copyright symbol
- Related rights
- Rome Convention for the Protection of Performers, Producers of Phonograms and Broadcasting Organisations
- WIPO Performances and Phonograms Treaty
