= Rome Convention for the Protection of Performers, Producers of Phonograms and Broadcasting Organisations =

1961 multilateral copyright treaty

Rome Convention
International Convention for the Protection of Performers, Producers of Phonograms and Broadcasting Organisations
- Signed: 26 October 1961
- Location: Rome
- Effective: 18 May 1964
- Condition: Ratification by Germany and three Principal Allied Powers
- Signatories: 26
- Parties: 100
- Depositary: Secretary-General of the United Nations
- Citations: 496 U.N.T.S 43
- Languages: English, French and Spanish (original)

The Rome Convention for the Protection of Performers, Producers of Phonograms and Broadcasting Organisations also known as the International Convention for the Protection of Performers, Producers of Phonograms and Broadcasting Organisations and the Rome Convention, secures protection in performances for performers, in phonograms for producers of phonograms (also known as sound recordings) and in broadcasts for broadcasting organisations. It was adopted in Rome on October 26, 1961.

As of July 2026, the treaty has 99 contracting parties, with a party defined as a State which has consented to be bound by the treaty and for which the treaty is in force.

The World Intellectual Property Organization is responsible for the administration of the convention jointly with the International Labour Organization (ILO) and the United Nations Educational, Scientific and Cultural Organization (UNESCO).

== History and scope ==
The Rome Convention was accepted by members of the United International Bureaux for the Protection of Intellectual Property (BIRPI), the predecessor to the modern World Intellectual Property Organization, on 26 October 1961. The Diplomatic Conference was jointly convened by BIRPI, the International Labour Organisation, and the United Nations Educational, Scientific and Cultural Organization.

The agreement extended copyright related rights protection for the first time to entities or individuals who are not the author but have a close relationship to a copyrighted work, including performers, sound recording producers and broadcasting organisations.

Nations drew up the Convention in response to new technologies like tape recorders that made the reproduction of sounds and images easier and cheaper than ever before. Whereas earlier copyright law, including international agreements like the 1886 Berne Convention, had been written to regulate the circulation of printed materials, the Rome Convention responded to the new circumstance of ideas variously represented in easily reproduced units by covering performers and producers of recordings under copyright:

1. Performers (actors, singers, musicians, dancers and other persons who perform literary or artistic works) are protected against certain acts they have not consented to. Such acts are: the broadcasting and the communication to the public of their live performance; the fixation of their live performance; the reproduction of such a fixation if the original fixation was made without their consent or if the reproduction is made for purposes different from those for which they gave their consent.
2. Producers of phonograms enjoy the right to authorise or prohibit the direct or indirect reproduction of their phonograms. Phonograms are defined in the Rome Convention as meaning any exclusively aural fixation of sounds of a performance or of other sounds. When a phonogram published for commercial purposes gives rise to secondary uses (such as broadcasting or communication to the public in any form), a single equitable remuneration must be paid by the user to the performers, or to the producers of phonograms, or to both; contracting States are free, however, not to apply this rule or to limit its application.
3. Broadcasting organisations enjoy the right to authorise or prohibit certain acts, namely: the rebroadcasting of their broadcasts; the fixation of their broadcasts; the reproduction of such fixations; the communication to the public of their television broadcasts if such communication is made in places accessible to the public against payment of an entrance fee.

The Rome Convention, 496 U.N.T.S 43, allows the following exceptions in national laws to the above-mentioned rights:

- private use
- use of short excerpts in connection with the reporting of current events
- ephemeral fixation by a broadcasting organisation by means of its own facilities and for its own broadcasts
- use solely for the purpose of teaching or scientific research
- in any other cases—except for compulsory licences that would be incompatible with the Berne Convention—where the national law provides exceptions to copyright in literary and artistic works.

Furthermore, once a performer has consented to the incorporation of his performance in a visual or audiovisual fixation, the provisions on performers' rights have no further application.

As to duration, protection must last at least until the end of a 20-year period computed from the end of the year in which:

- (a) the fixation was made, for phonograms and for performances incorporated therein;
- (b) the performance took place, for performances not incorporated in phonograms;
- (c) the broadcast took place.

However, national laws increasingly provide for a 50-year term of protection, at least for phonograms and performances.

== See also ==
- Geneva Phonograms Convention
- List of parties to the Rome Convention for the Protection of Performers, Producers of Phonograms and Broadcasting Organisations
