= Copyright law of the Russian Federation =

Copyright in Russia
• Copyright law of the Soviet Union
• Copyright law of the Russian Federation
• International copyright relations of Russia

The current Copyright law of the Russian Federation is codified in part IV of the Civil Code of the Russian Federation. It entered in force on January 1, 2008.

The first post-Soviet copyright law of the Russian Federation became effective on August 3, 1993. It completely replaced the older Soviet legislation that had been in effect until then. The new Copyright law of 1993 was based upon WIPO model laws and followed the continental European tradition: it clearly separated economic and moral rights, and it included detailed provisions for neighbouring rights.

The Copyright law of 1993 had specified a general duration of copyrights of 50 years beyond an author's death, or 50 years since the publication of an anonymous work. The implementation act for the law made the new law apply retroactively, restoring copyrights (and neighbouring rights) on works on which the shorter copyright terms from the Soviet-era had already expired or which had not been copyrighted at all under Soviet law. In 2004, this copyright term was extended to 70 years for all works still copyrighted as of the law's effective date.

In 2006, completely rewritten intellectual property laws were included in part IV of a new Civil Code of the Russian Federation. These new laws entered into force on January 1, 2008, replacing all previous intellectual property legislation, including the separate copyright law from 1993. Under Law of the Russian Federation No. 72-FZ of July 20, 2004, the copyright term was extended to 70 years, but only for works that had not already entered the public domain as of the effective date of that law. For works that have been created or published in other countries, the law now implements the rule of the shorter term, matching Russian copyright term with those existing in the country of origin.

== Transition from Soviet law ==
When the Soviet Union was dissolved and the fifteen republics of the Soviet Union became independent states, the copyright law of the USSR also split into fifteen independent copyright laws, each with its own jurisdiction defined by the territory of the new successor state of the Soviet Union. All these successor states initially took over the old Soviet legislation.

At the time of the disintegration of the USSR, the copyright law in force was defined by chapter IV of the union-wide 1961 Fundamentals of Civil Legislation, amended in 1973, when the USSR had joined the Universal Copyright Convention (UCC). Each of the republics implemented these Fundamentals in their own local laws. In the Russian SFSR, the Russian Civil Code had been adapted to the 1961 Fundamentals in 1964, and the 1973 changes due to the accession to the UCC entered in force in Russia on March 1, 1974. Since 1973, the USSR had had a general copyright term of the lifetime of the author of a work plus 25 years—the minimum prescribed the UCC.

Shortly before its demise, the Supreme Soviet of the Soviet Union had initiated an omnibus revision of the copyright law of the USSR to adapt it to a market economy. The new legislation on copyrights in chapter IV of 1991 Fundamentals was passed as law on March 31, 1991 and scheduled to enter in force on January 1, 1992. The 1991 Fundamentals extended the copyright term to 50 years p.m.a. and introduced neighbouring rights for the first time in Soviet legislation. But the USSR ceased to exist before the new 1991 law became effective.

In Russia, the Supreme Soviet of the Russian Federation passed a decree that made the USSR 1991 Fundamentals effective in Russia from August 3, 1992, on insofar as these Fundamentals contradicted neither the Constitution of the Russian Federation nor other legislative acts of Russia passed after June 12, 1990, and only on a temporary basis until the Russian Federation would have adopted a new, own Civil Code. The original USSR executive decree for the 1991 Fundamentals, which laid down the transitory provisions, did not enter in force in Russia, though, and the old Russian Civil Code remained in force insofar as it didn't contradict the 1991 Fundamentals. Chapter IV of the 1991 Fundamentals was thus in effect for exactly one year until on August 3, 1993, the new Copyright law of Russia entered in force.

== Copyright law of 1993 ==
The copyright law of 1993 was inspired by WIPO model laws and in some of its provisions heavily drew upon the formulations of the Conventions of Berne and Rome. The main innovations were much more detailed regulations on neighbouring rights, the adaptation of the law to new technologies, an expansion of contractual freedom, and provisions on collecting societies.

=== Objects of copyright ===
Under the 1993 law, copyright covers works of the sciences, literature, and the arts that are the result of creative activity and that exist in objective form. Neither the value nor the purpose of a work is a criterion for copyrightability. An "objective form" is any realization of a work such that it can be perceived by others in any way. Mere ideas are not copyrightable.

Copyright is vested in an author automatically upon the creation of a work (§9(1)). Both disclosed and undisclosed works are covered by copyright. "Disclosure" is a concept newly introduced in the copyright law of 1993 to put an end to the ambiguities surrounding the term "publication" in the old Soviet copyright law. In Soviet copyright, publication included ephemerally making available a work, such as through a performance, a speech, or a broadcast. However, for foreign works protected under Soviet law indirectly through international agreements (in particular the UCC), the definition of "publication" laid down by these agreements (typically the "making available of copies", which excluded ephemeral reproduction and required the physical fixation of a work) was used. The new law tried to resolve this confusion by using "disclosure" for the broader sense (making accessible of a work to the general public through publication, performance, broadcast, or any other means), and using "publication" generally only in the sense of distribution of copies of a work to the general public.

The law contains a non-exhaustive list of objective forms, which includes oral realizations. Speeches and jazz improvisations are covered by copyright, and so are interviews. Derivative works and collections or composite works are also eligible to copyright, regardless of whether or not the base works themselves are copyrighted. Among the examples of derivative works listed in the law are translations, abstracts, reviews, dramatizations, and arrangements. For collections, the originality in the selection and presentation of the collected works gives rise to copyright. Collections such as encyclopedias or databases are a special case of composite works, which also include newspapers, magazines, series of scientific works, or other periodicals.

Excluded from copyright are official documents such as laws, judicial decisions, and similar administrative texts, as well as the official translations of such documents. Also deemed uncopyrightable are state symbols and marks (flags, coats of arms, medals, monetary symbols, etc.). This also applies to the symbols of local or municipal authorities. Works of folklore are also not subject to copyright. Finally, purely informational reports on events and facts are not copyrightable, a provision corresponding to article 2(8) of the Berne Convention. If such a report goes beyond the purely factual and includes any commentary, analysis, prediction or other interpretation it is subject to copyright again.

The Russian copyright law of 1993 covered works first disclosed on Russian territory, as well as undisclosed works that existed in objective form within Russia, regardless of the nationality of the author. It also covered works of Russian authors that were first disclosed outside of Russia or that, if undisclosed, existed only abroad. Foreign works (i.e., works not disclosed in Russia or not existing there of an author who did not have Russian citizenship) were subject to the Russian copyright law according to the provisions of the international treaties Russia was a member of. In 2004, article 5, which laid down these definitions, was amended with a new sub-paragraph 5(4) to cover also foreign works that were still copyrighted in their foreign country of origin, but had never been copyrighted in Russia. Such restored copyrights on foreign works were limited to at most the copyright term they enjoyed in the foreign country.

=== Subjects of copyright ===
The original copyright holder on a work is always the natural person who created the work. Legal entities cannot be original copyright holders. For anonymously published works, the publisher is assumed (until proof to the contrary) to be the author's legal representative who may exercise the copyrights on the work.

If an employee creates a copyrightable work in the course of his duties vis-à-vis his employer, it is the employee who initially holds the copyright. The law stipulates, however, an automatic transfer of the economic rights to the employer, unless proven otherwise. Employers are required to pay the author royalties for each and every use of the work, but the parties are free to determine this fee and may set it arbitrarily low. If the work created is not connected with the duties of the employee, it does not fall under this special rule, even if the work was created on company time.

If several authors jointly create a work, they are all considered co-authors and initial copyright holders on the work. If their separate contributions to the work can be used independently, each author may use his part of the whole as he sees fit to do, unless there are contractual obligations to the contrary among the co-authors.

Movies are treated separately by the law as part of the category "audiovisual works". Russian law does not require "moving images": according to Elst, a slide show may be a "audiovisual work" if its internal consistency amongst the images is high enough. The law does, however, require that the images be recorded somehow: a live television broadcast is not an audiovisual work (but is covered by the broadcaster's neighbouring rights). For movies, the law exhaustively enumerates all the initial copyright holders: the director, the author of the script, and the composer of the film music, if any. The law stipulates a transfer of the economic rights relating to publishing the film (including the rights to subtitling and redubbing) to the producer, unless the contract specifies otherwise. Although not considered authors, other individuals such as the camera director or the set designer do have a copyright on their individual works. They may exploit their works independently of the film: a set designer may authorize the use of the set design for a theatre production, and a composer retains his right to remuneration if the music is performed. If the authors or other co-creators of a movie are employed by the producer, their works are subject to the rules for employee-created works. In this case, all economic rights are transferred by default to the producer.

In collective works such as encyclopedias, dictionaries, but also newspapers, magazines, periodicals, or also databases, the compiler is granted a copyright on the selection or arrangement, if either are creative. The compiler holds the exclusive economic rights on the use of the collection as a whole. Individual contributors keep their copyright on the parts they created, unless they transfer their rights by contract to the compiler.

=== Extent of copyrights ===
The 1993 copyright law of Russia recognizes both moral rights and economic rights. The moral rights of an author are:

- The right to paternity: the right to be recognized as an author and to attribution, including the right to have one's name withdrawn.
- The right to disclosure of the work. Disclosure again has the broad meaning of making the work accessible to the general public with the consent of the author through publication, public display, performance, broadcast, or other means. Publication is the distribution of copies of a work to the general public with the author's consent.
- The right to withdraw a work (except for employee-created works). The author must indemnify all exploiters of the (already disclosed) work if he chooses to exercise this option.
- The right to the integrity of the work protects an author's works from distortions or other modifications that would be deemed detrimental to the author's reputation or honor or outright libelous.

The exclusive economic rights, also called patrimonial rights, are:

- The right to reproduction of the work, including the rights to make three-dimensional copies of a two-dimensional work such as a blueprint (e.g., works of architecture) or to make two-dimensional copies (such as photos) from a three-dimensional work. In order to exercise this right, the copyright holder is also granted a right to access the original work, even if that physical original has passed into someone else's hands.
- The right to distribution, including sale and rental.
- The right to exhibition of a work, i.e., the right to public display.
- The rights to translation and adaptation.
- The right to communication of the work to the public, which includes public performances and broadcasts, including cable broadcasts.

The law does not recognize a general right of an author to receive a remuneration for the use of a work of his, since authors exclusively hold all the economic rights and can enforce a remuneration in the contracts they conclude with third parties. But the law does recognize two specialized remuneration rights:

- The right to remuneration for home copying of audio or audiovisual works. The royalties are levied on records and recording media such as tapes or disks and are collected and distributed by collecting societies.
- The resale right (droit de suite), which entitles an author to receive 5% of the new resale price for a work of art if that price is at least 20% higher than the last (re-)sale price. This applies only to works of the visual arts: paintings, sculptures, engravings, comics, and such, but not to photographs or manuscripts. This right is, like the moral rights, inalienable. It can be inherited.

These exclusive right of an author on his works are limited by a number of allowed free uses and one case of a compulsory license (home copying of records). All these free uses limit only the economic rights, the moral rights of an author remain in force. Furthermore, any such free use must not be harmful to the normal exploitation of a work and not harm the legitimate interests of authors.

The reproduction of a lawfully disclosed work is allowed for purely personal purposes, without paying royalties and without the consent of the author of the work. Exempted from this are reproductions of architectural works, databases, computer programs (but archive copies, i.e., backups are allowed), and musical scores. The copying of whole books, even if done only for personal purposes, is also not a free use but is subject to the author's economic rights.

Quotation is another free use. As in the Berne Convention, reproducing extracts from a legally disclosed work as a quote is allowed, but the amount copied must be more than necessary for the intended purpose (news reporting, teaching, criticism, reviews, and so on).

Libraries benefit of two free use provisions. The first allows them to make archival copies of works, and the second permits them to make single reprographic copies for the personal use of their clients. Several free uses relate to news reporting. Besides the general quotation, the Russian copyright law also has a provision that allows articles on current issues of economy, politics, social matters, or religion that have been published in newspapers or magazines to be freely reproduced by other newspapers.

Another free use concerns the freedom of panorama: works of the visual arts, photography, or architecture that are permanently installed in publicly accessible places (which includes museums or exhibition halls) may be reproduced if the work is not the main subject of the reproduction and if the reproduction is used only non-commercially.

=== Neighbouring rights ===
The neighbouring rights, introduced for the first time in the 1991 Fundamentals, were much expanded and clarified in the 1993 copyright law, following the provisions of the Rome Convention and in some cases also the WIPO Performances and Phonograms Treaty (WPPT). The law covers performances, phonograms, and broadcasts (including cable broadcasts). Neighbouring rights are, like the copyrights, automatic and not subject to formalities except the observance of any rights of the authors (or performers) of the works performed, recorded, or broadcast.

Performers are granted the exclusive rights to their performance, including a right to remuneration for any uses of a performance or a recording thereof. Besides the right to perform a performance and to deny others to perform it, these exclusive rights cover also the live broadcasting of a performance, and the video or audio recording of a previously unfixed performance. As in article 7(1)(c) of the Rome Convention for the Protection of Performers, Producers of Phonograms and Broadcasting Organisations, performers' rights also cover the reproduction of non-authorized recordings, and also the reproduction of recordings for purposes other than those agreed upon, including the broadcast of a recording made for non-commercial purposes only. For broadcasts of records made for commercial purposes, the performers, together with the phonogram producer, have only a remuneration right on this secondary use of phonograms.

Phonogram producers have exclusive rights on the use of their phonograms, again including a right to remuneration. Their exclusive rights cover the reproduction of the phonogram, the right to distribute the phonogram by sale or rental, and the right to import copies of the phonogram. The distribution right extends only to the first sale of a copy. The law does not recognize a non-commercial public lending right on phonograms.

Both artists and phonogram producers have a right to remuneration for secondary uses of a phonogram made for commercial purposes, such as public performance or terrestrial transmission of the recording. A collecting society shall collect the royalties for these uses and distributes them equally amongst the performers and phonogram producers.

=== Duration of copyrights ===
The 1993 copyright law reaffirmed the prolonged copyright term of generally 50 years from the 1991 Fundamentals, applicable to all kinds of works. Works of known authors were copyrighted until 50 years after the author's death (50 years p.m.a.). Anonymous or pseudonymous works were copyrighted until fifty years after the first disclosure, unless the identity of the author became known during that time and the term of 50 years p.m.a. thus applied. For works with several authors, the copyright term was calculated from the death of the longest-living of the co-authors. For authors who had worked during or fought in the Great Patriotic War, the duration of copyrights was extended by four years. For posthumously published works, copyrights were defined to last until fifty years after the publication, and for posthumously rehabilitated authors, the fifty-year term began running at the date of the rehabilitation. All terms were to be calculated from January 1 following the date the fact occurred that caused the term to begin running. The moral rights to authorship, name, and integrity of the work were defined to be perpetual.

Concerning the neighbouring rights, the term of protection was fifty years since the original performance or broadcast. For phonograms, the term was fifty years since the first publication, or fifty years since the fixation of the phonogram if not published within that time. Similar rules as for copyright concerning posthumously published works or authors who had lived during the Great Patriotic War or who were posthumously rehabilitated existed also for the neighbouring rights.

In 2004, the 50-year term was extended to 70 years for all works still copyrighted.

=== Contractual regulations ===
The copyright law of 1993 also contained, similar to other European copyright laws, contract provisions regulating the transfer of copyrights. Contracts have to be in writing, except for contracts about the use of a work in a periodical, which may be concluded orally. Shrink-wrap licenses for software are allowed. The law distinguishes between exclusive and non-exclusive transfers of rights. Only patrimonial rights can be transferred, but not moral rights, the resale right, or the right to remuneration for home-copying. In any contract, only those rights explicitly mentioned are transferred, and a transfer is only considered exclusive if the contract explicitly says so. Any contract must specify for which uses the rights on a work are transferred, for which term this transfer is valid, for which territory it applies, and it must define the remuneration the author receives. If no term is specified, an author may revoke the contract after five years with six months notice. If the territory in unspecified, the contract applies only to the territory of the Russian Federation. The remuneration must in general be given as a percentage of the gross income (sale price) generated by the use of the work, if the contract does not contain a remuneration clause, government-defined minimum schedules apply. The law prohibits the transfer of rights on future works or for future methods of exploitations. Unless the contract explicitly includes a sub-licensing permission, a licensee may not transfer some or all of the licensed rights to a third party.

=== Retroactivity ===
The implementation act for the new copyright law, law no. 5352-1 of July 9, 1993, stated that the copyright provisions from the 1991 Fundamentals were invalidated. It also stated that the new copyright law applied to all works on which the 50-year term for copyrights and neighbouring rights had not yet elapsed in 1993. Subsequently, a discussion amongst copyright specialists erupted about the precise meaning of this.

Many Russian scholars agreed that this provision from the implementation act made the law apply retroactively, restoring copyrights on Soviet works on which the much shorter copyright terms from Soviet times had already expired. This also applied to neighbouring rights on performances, phonograms, and broadcasts. Gavrilov presented a dissenting opinion, stating that while this might have been the intention, the wording did not actually have that effect. Elst argued that the 1993 law would have been inconsistent and contain several meaningless provisions if it were not retroactive. In the United States, the general consensus was that the Russian 1993 law was retroactive. In a ruling in 2006, the Supreme Court of the Russian Federation confirmed the retroactivity of the 1993 law, explaining that it placed even works under copyright again if their old, Soviet 25-year term had already expired. Under the 1993 copyright law, all Russian or Soviet works from the RSFSR published in 1943 or later, as well as works of authors who died in 1943 or later, became thus copyrighted in Russia in 1993. Because of the term extension of four years for authors who had lived during the Great Patriotic War, even some earlier works became subject to copyright. In the case of works formerly copyrighted under Soviet law, this amounted to a restoration of copyright; for the neighbouring rights, which hadn't existed in Soviet times, the law granted those rights retroactively. The 1993 copyright law thus rendered the old Soviet legislation largely obsolete in Russia; the former laws remained applicable only to copyright violations that had occurred before August 3, 1993.

Examples of works that became copyrighted again in 1993 include the works of Boris Pilniak (executed in 1938, rehabilitated in 1957), Isaac Babel (executed 1940, rehabilitated 1954), or also Osip Mandelstam (died 1938, rehabilitated 1956/1987). Other authors on whose works copyright was restored were Anna Akhmatova (died 1966), Vera Mukhina (died 1953, sculptor of the statue "Worker and Kolkhoz Woman"), Aleksey Shchusev (died 1949, architect of the Lenin Mausoleum), Aleksey Tolstoy (died 1945), and many others. An extreme example is Mikhail Bulgakov's The Master and Margarita: the work was first published posthumously in 1966. At that time, the Soviet copyright term of then 15 years p.m.a. had already expired as Bulgakov had died in 1940. The new Russian copyright law from 1993 placed this work under copyright again, because the 50-year term was calculated from 1966 on.

=== Amendments of the 1993 Copyright law ===
On July 19, 1995, Federal Law 110-FL changed the copyright law, strengthening the measures for protecting copyrights against infringements. Law 110-FL also made corresponding amendments in the Criminal Code of the Russian Federation and in related laws.

Governmental decree no. 524 of May 29, 1998, which was published on June 16, 1998, clarified that for movies created before August 3, 1992, the film studios were no longer considered the authors, as had been the case under the old Soviet law. Instead, the authors of these cinematographic works were the natural persons identified in the 1993 law as such. The decree explicitly declared that these authors were entitled to receive royalties for uses of these films (broadcast, whether by cable or wireless, reproduction, distribution (including rental), and showing to the public) and defined a remuneration schedule expressed in percentages of the income generated by the use of the works. The decree also clarified that the copyright on such Soviet films was subject to the rules of the 1993 law: the authors were the initial rights holders, and there was a presumption of a transfer of rights to the studios unless there existed an agreement to the contrary. (See also "Subjects of copyright" above.)

On August 8, 2004, the copyright law of Russia was amended by federal law no. 72-FL, by which the general copyright term was extended from 50 to 70 years. This term extension applied only to works that were still copyrighted in Russia in 2004.

The same law also modified the provisions on the copyright of foreign works. It added an article 5(4) to the law that defined that a foreign work was eligible to copyright in Russia if its copyright had not expired in the source country and it had not fallen into the public domain in Russia through the expiry of its copyright term. Previously, foreign works published before May 27, 1973, when the USSR had joined the Universal Copyright Convention (UCC), had not been copyrighted at all in the Soviet Union or in Russia, even after Russia had joined the Berne Convention in 1995. When Russia had signed the Berne Convention, it had made a reservation regarding article 18 of the Berne Convention by stating that it would not consider the Berne Convention applicable to any works in the public domain in Russia. Foreign pre-1973 works thus remained uncopyrighted in Russia, although they should have become subject to copyright according to article 18(2) of the Berne Convention because that article only exempted works that once were copyrighted, but on which that copyright already had expired, which didn't apply to pre-1973 foreign works in Russia. Russia faced severe criticism for this, especially from Western countries. The new article 5(4) of the Russian copyright law was supposed to resolve the situation by restoring copyright on such foreign works and making Russia's copyright law fully compliant with the Berne Convention. Nevertheless, the common practice in Russia did not change; pre-1973 foreign works were still commonly considered to be uncopyrighted in Russia due to this reservation.

Other provisions of law 72-FL amended the 1993 copyright law of Russia in several areas, especially concerning neighbouring rights, to make the legislation compliant with the WIPO Copyright Treaty and the WIPO Performances and Phonograms Treaty.

== 2008–present: Part IV of the Civil Code ==
Since its foundation as an independent successor state of the former Soviet Union, the Russian Federation had been engaged in a large legislative project of developing a new Civil Code. Part I of this new Civil Code of the Russian Federation was signed into law on November 30, 1994, by President Boris Yeltsin and became effective on January 1, 1995. In article 2, it situates the copyright law within the Civil law. Copyright legislation was originally planned to be included in part III of this new Civil Code. Several drafts for new chapters on copyrights were prepared, but the matter proved so difficult that part III of the Civil Code was delayed several times. It was finally adopted on November 26, 2001 without the chapter on intellectual property, which was postponed to part IV.

Part IV of the Civil Code took several years to work out and was submitted to the State Duma in July 2006. The draft of the new intellectual property legislation was heavily criticized for being too unclear and for conflicting with Russia's international obligations, and also for introducing several untested novelties. In the following months, about 500 changes were made to the draft, before it passed its final reading in the Duma on November 24, 2006. After it had also passed through the Federation Council, part IV of the new Russian Civil Code, containing articles 1225 to 1551, was signed into law as Federal Law no. 230-FL by Vladimir Putin on December 18, 2006. The implementation act (Federal Law no. 231-FL) was signed on the same day; it declared part IV of the Civil Code to enter in force on January 1, 2008 with the effect of invalidating and replacing all previous intellectual property legislation.

Part IV of the Civil Code was a comprehensive intellectual property legislation. It contained the copyright law proper in chapters 70 (authors' rights) and 71 (neighbouring rights); chapter 69 contained general provisions also applicable to copyright. Other chapters dealt with patent law (chapter 72), the protection of breeders' rights (ch. 73), of integrated circuits (mask works; ch. 74), of trade secrets (know-how; ch. 75), and also of trade marks, brands, and geographical indications (ch. 76). Chapter 77 detailed rules for technological applications, in particular those developed on a federal budget. A provision for the protection of domain names was removed from the draft before it was adopted.

Although the new intellectual property legislation was a complete rewrite from scratch and was structured quite differently than the previous 1993 Copyright Act, there were actually only minor changes in substance concerning copyright proper in the new legislation. With the exception of the Implementation Act discussed below, most changes were clarifications of omissions or of disputed points in the 1993 law. Among the true novelties introduced by the new legislation in the area of copyrights were a publication right (a copyright granted to the publisher of a previously unpublished, uncopyrighted work with a period of 25 years from the publication), and the definition of two kinds of contracts: one for copyright transfers, and licenses for granting usage rights. Newly, gratis licences were explicitly allowed (article 1235). A subtle change concerned the calculation of the copyright term for posthumously published works, which began newly from the disclosure instead of from the publication. (See above for the difference.) For a work that was disclosed during the author's lifetime, the copyright term of 70 years thus runs from the year the author died (or was rehabilitated, if the rehabilitation was posthumous), even if the work is published only later. The new legislation also no longer contained a provision for a "domaine publique payant" as the 1993 Copyright Act did in its article 28(3).

The Implementation Act 231-FL made the new legislation applicable also to legal relations from before the coming in force of the new law, as far as new rights granted by the new law were concerned (retroactivity). In article 5 of the implementation act, the new law was made applicable to all new works, as well as to new rights that arose on pre-existing works. Existing rights on already existing works were henceforth governed by the rules of the new law, but initial authorship was to be determined by the laws in effect at the time a work was created. Article 6 of the implementation act specified that the 70-year copyright term was applicable in all cases where the old 50-year copyright term had not yet expired by January 1, 1993, and to all cases from before August 3, 1993 where a legal entity was the copyright holder - this applies to "whole works" in the form of cinematographic, television, radio works, as well as print periodicals and compilations, which were created by a state corporation, but individual authors such as script writers, artists, composers etc. retain copyright for their respective parts of the work. In this latter case, the copyright was to expire 70 years after the work was first lawfully disclosed, or 70 years after the creation of the work, if the work was undisclosed. Previously, the 70-year copyright term had applied only to works whose 50-year term had not yet expired in 2004, and thus the new Part IV of the Civil Code removed a number of works from the public domain, namely all those where the 50-year term had expired in the years 1994-2003: these became copyrighted again (with a 70-year term) under the new intellectual property legislation.

Russia had committed in a trade agreement with the U.S. in November 2006 to ensure that new legislation, including part IV of the Civil Code, would be fully TRIPS compliant, even if such legislation was passed before an eventual accession of Russia to the WTO. After part IV of the Civil Code had entered in force on January 1, 2008, the Russian Federation also acceded on November 5, 2008, to the WIPO Copyright Treaty and to the WIPO Performances and Phonograms Treaty (entry in force of both accessions on February 5, 2009). On August 22, 2012, the Russian Federation also became a member of the World Trade Organization.

A small but significant amendment to Part IV of the Civil Code came into effect on October 1, 2014, after lobbying by members of the Russian Wikipedia community. The new amendment recognized free licenses, giving authors of freely-licensed works legal protection against misuse of their works. Freedom of panorama was also expanded for works of architecture in public spaces, guaranteeing legal protection to reusers wishing to use images of architecture for commercial purposes.

== See also ==
- Public Domain in the Russian Federation tags list from Wikimedia Commons
- Gevorkyan v. Moshkov
- International copyright
