= Copyright law of Russia =

Copyright in Russia
• Copyright law of the Soviet Union
• Copyright law of the Russian Federation
• International copyright relations of Russia

Copyright in Russia developed originally along the same lines as in Western European countries. A first copyright statute dated back to 1828, and in 1857, a general copyright term of fifty years was instituted. The copyright law of 1911 was inspired by Western laws of the continental European tradition. One noteworthy exception in Russian copyright law was the "freedom of translation"—any work could be freely translated into another language.

Under the Soviet Union, the copyright law was changed to conform more to Socialist ideology and economics. The duration of copyright was reduced, first to 25 years from the first publication of a work and then changed in 1928 to 15 years after the author's death, before it was increased to 25 years p.m.a. in 1973, when the USSR joined the Universal Copyright Convention. After the demise of the Soviet Union, the Russian Federation at first took over the last Soviet legislation from 1991, which hadn't even become effective anymore in the USSR. In 1993, a new, modernized copyright law of Russia entered in force, which was in-line with the leading international copyright treaties. As part of a project to develop a new Civil Code of Russia, the copyright law was completely rewritten and integrated into the Civil Code in 2006, with the new provisions becoming effective on January 1, 2008.

On an international level, the Soviets pursued until the late 1960s an isolationist policy. While the Tsars had concluded several short-lived bilateral copyright treaties with Western nations, the Soviet Union had no external copyright relations at all until 1967, when it concluded a first bilateral treaty with Hungary. A major change occurred in 1973, when the USSR joined the Universal Copyright Convention. Subsequently, more bilateral treaties were concluded, amongst them two with Western countries (Austria and Sweden). After its foundation as an independent successor state of the USSR, the Russian Federation joined the Berne Convention in 1995. The negotiations about the adherence of Russia to the World Trade Organization (WTO) led to several amendments of the Russian copyright law in order to meet the adherence requirements.

== History of domestic copyright legislation ==
The origins of copyright

Copyright—the idea that an author of a work has rights on the uses and the reproduction of the work—originated in the field of literature. With the inventions of the printing press and of movable type, copies of literary works could be made quicker and cheaper than before, and the works could be disseminated more widely. But the unrestricted rivalry amongst print shops led quickly to the dissemination of competing and unauthorized editions of various works, which diminished prospects of any payment, or even entailed loss, for the authors, editors, and printers of the original issue, and thus discouraged further undertaking. European rulers also quickly realized that the granting of legal monopolies on wide distribution of printed works could be employed for political purposes—not only by themselves, but also by their opponents. The printing business was soon regulated through printing prerogatives granted by the rulers to print shops, authorizing them to print certain works and giving them a monopoly on these works. Such monopolies not only served as a market regulator but also as a censorship device, as they could be revoked if the printed works were not to the liking of the ruler.

The development of copyright in Russia followed the same lines as in Western Europe, only about a century later. The first printing press was installed in Moscow in the late 1550s with the support of Tsar Ivan IV; the first dated book was printed there in 1564. Printing was strictly controlled by the Tsars and remained reserved mostly for religious works. Tsar Peter the Great was the first to grant printing privileges for printing secular works in Russian to a few select printers, both from Russia and from abroad. Under Peter's reign, the print production in Russia rose tremendously, but except for the printers of the Eastern Orthodox Church, most print shops remained state owned. The first printing privilege granted to a private (and non-Russian) printer for the printing of literature in foreign languages was granted by Catherine II of Russia in 1771 to a printer in St. Petersburg. At the same time, a decree also installed censorship measures for the control of foreign-language works. The first private press with the right to print in Russian was founded in 1776, and in 1783, Russian printed works were also subjected to censorship. The events of the French Revolution led Catherine to have most private print shops closed down again; and her successor Paul I prohibited in 1808 the importation of foreign books again.

=== Copyright in Tsarist Russia ===
The printing prerogatives granted until then were rights accorded to the printers, not to the authors of a work. The first copyright provisions in a modern sense as rights an author has over uses of his work appeared in the reign of Alexander I, when he issued on April 22, 1828 a "Statute on censorship" (Ustav o tsenzure; Russian: Устав о цензуре) that contained five articles on copyright. This law granted authors or translators the exclusive rights to reproduce, publish, and distribute their works, and recognized their right to be paid for uses or reproductions of their works. Copyright was automatic and was vested in the author or translator upon the creation of the work and without any need for a registration. The law defined a copyright term of the lifetime of the author plus 25 years (25 years p.m.a.—Latin: post mortem auctoris). It also defined a "freedom of translation": any work was free to be translated without the consent of its author, and the translator got a new copyright on the translation. Copyright was extinguished if the work didn't meet the censorship regulations (i.e., was censored).

On February 4, 1830, a decree modified these provisions slightly. It defined that the copyright term was extended by additional ten years to 35 years p.m.a. if a work was republished in the last five years of the original 25-year term. In 1845, the Council of State extended copyright to cover also music, and in 1846, works of the visual arts became subject to copyright. Two major changes occurred in 1857. Upon a request by the widow of Aleksandr Pushkin, the Council of State extended the copyright term from 25 to 50 years p.m.a. The same year, it also extended copyright to cover works of foreign authors that were first published on the territory of Russia.

An imperial decree in 1897 tasked a commission to revise the copyright law. After nine years of work, a draft that was based on the German copyright law of 1901 was presented to the Duma in 1906. After lengthy proceedings, the new law was passed in 1909 and finally approved by Tsar Nicholas II on March 20, 1911. For the first time, copyright was expressed truly independently from censorship regulations. Censorship was not linked anymore in any way to the existence or the exercise of copyrights on a work.

The 1911 copyright contained 75 articles in seven chapters. It granted copyright to works of Russian subjects and to works by foreigners that were first published on Russian territory. Unpublished foreign works were also copyrighted. Foreign works first published abroad could be freely translated and then published, but publishing such a foreign work in the original language or performing music composed by foreigners abroad was only allowed with the consent of the foreign copyright holder.

Copyright covered literary, musical, dramatic, artistic, and photographic works. The new law recognized the moral rights of paternity (attribution right) and integrity of the work. Authors were granted the exclusive rights to reproduce, publish, and distribute a work, to perform dramatic and musical works in public, to record a musical work, and to produce a novel from a dramatic work or vice versa. These rights were automatic, came into existence upon the creation of the work, and were not subject to any formalities requirements.

=== Copyright in the Soviet Union ===
After the October Revolution, the Tsarist copyright law from 1911 remained initially in force, although it was partly invalidated by numerous decrees. The copyright term was reduced from 50 years p.m.a. to the lifetime of an author. Many works were nationalized, first only works of deceased authors, but later also works of still living authors. The nationalizations of the publishing houses restricted the possibilities of authors to publish their works, effectively restricting their exclusive rights.

On January 30, 1925, the Central Executive Committee passed a new copyright law. These "Fundamentals of Copyright Law" were replaced already three years later, on May 16, 1928, by a second version that then remained in effect essentially unchanged for thirty years. In 1961, the copyright law was incorporated into the Civil Law. On December 8, 1961, the Supreme Soviet of the USSR passed the Fundamentals of Civil Legislation, which entered in force on May 1, 1962. Chapter IV of these Fundamentals contained the eleven articles that constituted the copyright law.

In the Soviet legislation, these union-wide Fundamentals (Osnovy; Основы) were only a binding framework; the individual republics of the Soviet Union then had to implement the provisions of the Fundamentals in their own republic laws. Although these different versions of the law differed in some details, the basic characteristics of Soviet copyright remained more or less constant throughout these revisions, and also across the various republics' laws. Copyright was granted on the creative works of Soviet citizens, whether published or unpublished. Foreign works were copyrighted only if they were first published in the USSR or, if unpublished, existed in objective form on the territory of the USSR. Copyright was automatic and came into existence upon the creation of the work; no formalities were required (with the exception of photographs, which were only copyrighted if they bore the name of the studio or the photographer, the address, and the year).

Authors were granted the personal rights to attribution and to the integrity of the work; these rights were perpetual and linked to the author (they could not be inherited); they were enforced after the author's death by the VUOAP (see below). Furthermore, the law recognized the rights of an author to reproduce, publish, and disseminate a work, and to be remunerated for uses of his work. Until 1961, these rights were nominally "exclusive" rights of the author, but the common view of Soviet legal theorists and the actual practices had always maintained that an author actually did not enjoy exclusive publishing rights on his works and could not publish his works himself, but was only entitled to receive remuneration if the official bodies approved the publication of a work. Consequently, the 1961 Fundamentals did no longer call these rights "exclusive".

The general copyright term changed with each revision of the law. The 1925 Fundamentals had defined that copyrights subsisted for 25 years since the first publication of a work. In 1928, this was changed to the lifetime of the author plus 15 years (15 years p.m.a.). The 1961 Fundamentals reduced this to the lifetime of the author, but allowed individual republics to devise their own rules. The Fundamentals also made mention of the inheritance of copyrights. The Russian SFSR defined in its chapter IV of the 1964 RSFSR Civil Code a copyright term of 15 years p.m.a.

The copyrights of an author were limited by a broad array of uses allowed without the author's consent that were defined not to be copyright infringements. The law provided for "free uses" and also for compulsory licenses. Free uses of a work allowed anyone to use a published, copyrighted work without the original author's consent and without the payment of royalties, while compulsory licenses were those cases where the use was also allowed without the author's consent, but only if royalties were paid. Both the free uses and the compulsory licenses were subject only to the proper attribution of the author. The state also reserved the right to execute a compulsory purchase of the copyrights on a work. This provision was rarely applied, usually to prevent an "excessive unearned income" of the heirs of the author of a successful work.

Amongst the free uses, Soviet copyright continued to grant the freedom of translation. Any work could be translated without the author's consent, and the translator was granted a separate and independent copyright on the translation. With the entry in force of the 1961 Fundamentals, translators were required to maintain the meaning and the integrity of the original work.

Copyrights were non-transferable under Soviet law. Authors could only grant a publisher a time-limited right to use a work through mandatory author's contracts defined by the state. These contracts were limited to at most five years, the intended use of the work had to be clearly spelled out, and if the publisher accepted the delivered work, he was obliged to actually publish it within at most two years. The contract also specified the remuneration the author was entitled to. The allowed range of the amount of royalties was prescribed in governmental remuneration schedules. Individual republics of the USSR were free to devise their own rules for standard publication contracts and royalty tariffs. A union-wide collecting society called the "All-Union Administration for the Protection of Copyrights" (VUOAP – Vsesoiuznoe upravlenie po ochrane avtorskich prav; Всесоюзное управление по охране авторских прав, ВУОАП) was founded in the 1930s to centralize all collection and payments of royalties.

The exercise of copyright in the Soviet Union was subject to the rules of censorship and the literary controls, the press legislation, the laws on printing, publishing, and selling, and Party directives. In general, only authors of "socially useful" works were granted full copyrights; on "useless works" such as Church hymns no economic rights could be enforced; and authors of undesirable works faced administrative, or social, or even penal sanctions. As a way to bypass this governmental control for literary works samizdat developed: the non-commercial dissemination of works in chain-letter fashion through carbon-copies produced by readers on their typewriters. Many samizdat works were considered to be "anti-Soviet agitation" by the authorities and the authors were prosecuted under article 58(10) (later articles 70 and 190(1)) of the RSFSR Criminal Code or corresponding provisions of the other republics' penal laws.

In 1973, the USSR joined the Universal Copyright Convention (UCC), ending its self-imposed isolation (but also its independence) in copyright matters. The treaty entered in force with respect the USSR on May 27, 1973. Foreign works published after that date outside of the USSR became copyrighted in the Soviet Union if the author was a national of any other signatory country of the UCC or if the work was first published in any other UCC country, and vice versa: Soviet works published after this date became copyrighted in other UCC countries. The Soviet Union had to adapt its copyright laws to meet the requirements of the UCC. It did so by increasing the copyright term to 25 years p.m.a. and by abolishing the freedom of translation: translations henceforth were subject to the consent of the author of the original work. In exchange, two new free uses were included in the law in 1973, one of which was a very broad free use permission allowing newspapers to reproduce any published report or scientific, artistic, literary, or oral work; either in the original or as a translation.

The VUOAP was replaced by a new agency, the "All-Union Agency on Copyright" (VAAP – Vsesoiuznoe agentstvo po avtorskim pravam; Всесоюзное агентство по авторским правам, ВААП). The VAAP took over the VUOAP's function as a collecting society, but additionally held the state monopoly on foreign trade in copyrights. All licensing contracts with foreign publishers had to be concluded through VAAP; authors and Soviet publishers were forbidden to negotiate directly with foreign publishers.

The monopoly of the VAAP was abolished in 1989. Also during Perestroika, a work group was formed with the task to adapt the Soviet copyright law to a market economy. These efforts culminated in the passing of a profoundly revised copyright law on March 31, 1991. This new law was a radical break with the previous Socialist practice. Author's rights were exclusive again, the copyright term was increased to 50 years p.m.a., neighbouring rights were introduced for the first time in Soviet legislation, and the free uses were reduced considerably and defined much narrower. Compulsory licenses were abolished altogether. The initial copyright owner in a work in all cases was the natural person who created the work; the copyright of legal entities no longer existed. The provisions of the 1991 Fundamentals, which were scheduled to enter in force on January 1, 1992, never became effective in the Soviet Union, as the USSR was dissolved before that date.

=== Copyright in the Russian Federation ===
In Russia, the Supreme Soviet of the Russian Federation passed a decree that made the USSR 1991 Fundamentals effective in Russia from August 3, 1992 on, insofar as these Fundamentals contradicted neither the Constitution of the Russian Federation nor other legislative acts of Russia passed after June 12, 1990. Section IV of the 1991 Fundamentals was in effect for exactly one year until the new Copyright law of the Russian Federation entered in force on August 3, 1993.

==== The Copyright Law of 1993 ====
The copyright law of 1993 was inspired by WIPO model laws and in some of its provisions heavily drew upon the formulations of the Conventions of Berne and Rome. The main innovations were much more detailed regulations on neighbouring rights, the adaptation of the law to new technologies, an expansion of contractual freedom, and provisions on collecting societies.

Like its predecessors, the new law granted copyrights on creative works that existed in some objective form. This objective form needed not be tangible, any form by which the work could be perceived by others sufficed, including an oral form. Mere ideas that had not been externalized were excluded from copyright, as were simple facts and instructions and such. Also excluded from copyright were official documents, state symbols (including money), and folklore; this also covered the symbols of local or municipal authorities. Computer programs were copyrighted as literary works, databases as collective works.

Copyrights were not subject to any formalities and arose upon the creation of a work. The rights were always vested in the natural person who had created the work; legal entities could no longer be original copyright owners. As before, the law covered all works first published on the territory of the Russian Federation, as well as unpublished works that existed there in an objective form, regardless of the nationality of the author. Works of Russian citizens, whether published or unpublished, were also covered. On other works first published in a foreign country, or, if unpublished, existed in objective form only abroad, the law specified they were subject to copyright in Russia according to the provisions of the international treaties the Russian Federation was a member of. If a work was published within thirty days in a foreign country and in Russia, it was considered to have been first published in Russia. (Article 5 of the law, which laid down these definitions, was modified in 2004 by law no. 72-FL.)

Following the continental European tradition of author's rights, the law recognized moral and economic (patrimonial) rights. A special right of the author to remuneration was no longer mentioned: it was not needed anymore since the author's rights were exclusive and authors could freely negotiate contracts. On contracts, the law provided that only the rights explicitly mentioned in a contract were transferred, and that the new rights holder could sub-license these rights to a third party only if the contract explicitly provided for this. Furthermore, contracts were not allowed to cover the future works of an author.

The neighbouring rights, introduced for the first time in the 1991 Fundamentals, were much expanded and clarified in the 1993 copyright law. The law covered performances, phonograms, and broadcasts (including cable broadcasts). Visual fixations (videograms) were not covered. Neighbouring rights were, like the copyrights, automatic and not subject to formalities except the observance of any rights of the authors (or performers) of the works performed, recorded, or broadcast. Performers were granted the moral rights to attribution and to the integrity of the work. The exclusive economic rights comprised the rights to (re-)perform a performance, including a right to be remunerated for any reuses of a performance, and the rights to reproduction, recording, distribution, broadcasts, and rebroadcasts of a performance, a phonogram, or a broadcast. Phonogram producers were even granted an exclusive right to adaptations of their recordings, a provision that goes even beyond the WIPO Performances and Phonograms Treaty. The 1993 law covered phonograms first published in Russia or created by a Russian person or company, broadcasts of broadcasting organizations having their legal residence in Russia, and performances of Russian artists, as wells as performances first performed in Russia, and also performances recorded or broadcast in Russia, if the record or broadcast was covered by the law.

The law specified a copyright term of fifty years, applicable to all kinds of works. Works of known authors were copyrighted until 50 years after the author's death (50 years p.m.a.). Anonymous or pseudonymous works were copyrighted until fifty years after the first publication, unless the identity of the author became known during that time and the term of 50 years p.m.a. thus applied. For works with several authors, the copyright term was calculated from the death of the longest-living of the co-authors. For authors who had worked during or fought in the Great Patriotic War, the duration of copyrights was extended by four years. For posthumously published works, copyrights were defined to last until fifty years after the publication, and for posthumously rehabilitated authors, the fifty-year term began running at the date of the rehabilitation. All terms were to be calculated from January 1 following the date the fact occurred that caused the term to begin running. The moral rights to authorship, name, and integrity of the work were defined to be perpetual.

Concerning the neighbouring rights, the term of protection was fifty years since the original performance or broadcast. For phonograms, the term was fifty years since the first publication, or fifty years since the fixation of the phonogram if not published within that time. Similar rules as for copyright concerning posthumously published works or authors who had lived during the Great Patriotic War or who were posthumously rehabilitated existed also for the neighbouring rights.

The 1993 copyright law contained a list of allowed free uses of copyrighted works, similar to may other countries' laws. Free uses only related to limitations on the patrimonial rights of an author on a work; his moral rights remained untouched. Any free use was subject to the condition that it did not impede an author's legitimate rights and did not harm the normal exploitation of a work. The free uses contained provisions on reproductions made purely for personal uses and on archival copies (backups), as well as quotation rights, and provisions on news reporting (including a provision allowing the reproduction of previously published news reports in other newspapers or broadcasts.)

==== Implementation Act for the Copyright Law of 1993 ====
The implementation act for the new copyright law, law no. 5352-1 of July 9, 1993, stated that the copyright provisions from the 1991 Fundamentals were invalidated. It also stated that the new copyright law applied to all works on which the 50-year term for copyrights and neighbouring rights had not yet elapsed in 1993. Subsequently, a discussion amongst copyright specialists erupted about whether this made the law applied retroactively, restoring copyrights on works on which the shorter copyright terms from the Soviet-era had already expired or which had not been copyrighted at all under Soviet law. The question was resolved definitively only in 2006, when the Supreme Court of the Russian Federation confirmed the retroactivity of the 1993 law, explaining that it placed even works under copyright again if their old, Soviet 25-year term had already expired. For the neighbouring rights, which hadn't existed in Soviet times, the law granted those rights retroactively. The 1993 copyright law thus rendered the old Soviet legislation largely obsolete in Russia; it remained applicable only to copyright violations that had occurred before August 3, 1993.

==== Amendments of the 1993 law ====
On July 19, 1995, Federal Law 110-FL changed the copyright law, strengthening the measures for protecting copyrights against infringements. Law 110-FL also made corresponding amendments in the Criminal Code of the Russian Federation and in related laws. Three years later, a governmental decree clarified that for Soviet films, the director and other persons identified by the 1993 law as authors were indeed to be considered the authors and entitled to royalties for uses of these films, and not, as had been the case under the old Soviet law, the film studios.

On August 8, 2004, the copyright law of Russia was amended by federal law no. 72-FL, by which the general copyright term was extended from 50 to 70 years. This term extension applied only to works that were still copyrighted in Russia in 2004. The same law also modified the provisions on the copyright of foreign works. (See "Berne Convention" below.) It added an article 5(4) to the law that defined that a foreign work was eligible to copyright in Russia if its copyright had not expired in the source country and it had not fallen into the public domain in Russia through the expiry of its copyright term. Other provisions of law 72-FL amended the 1993 copyright law of Russia in several areas, especially concerning neighbouring rights, to make the legislation compliant with the WIPO Copyright Treaty and the WIPO Performances and Phonograms Treaty.

==== Part IV of the Russian Civil Code ====
Since its foundation as an independent successor state of the former Soviet Union, the Russian Federation had been engaged in a large legislative project of developing a new Civil Code, which was also to encompass the intellectual property laws. Several drafts for new chapters on intellectual property rights including copyrights were prepared, but the matter proved so difficult that this legislation was postponed several times. The draft of the new intellectual property legislation was heavily criticized for being too unclear and for conflicting with Russia's international obligations, and also for introducing several untested novelties. Finally, the new intellectual property laws were included in part IV of the Russian Civil Code as articles 1225 to 1551. Part IV was signed into law as Federal Law no. 230-FL by Vladimir Putin on December 18, 2006. The implementation act (Federal Law no. 231-FL) was signed on the same day; it declared part IV of the Civil Code to enter in force on January 1, 2008 with the effect of invalidating and replacing all previous intellectual property legislation.

Part IV of the Civil Code was a comprehensive intellectual property legislation. It contained the copyright law proper in chapters 70 (authors' rights) and 71 (neighbouring rights); chapter 69 contained general provisions also applicable to copyright. Other chapters dealt with patent law (chapter 72), the protection of breeders' rights (ch. 73), of integrated circuits (mask works; ch. 74), of trade secrets (know-how; ch. 75), and also of trade marks, brands, and geographical indications (ch. 76). Chapter 77 detailed rules for technological applications, in particular those developed on a federal budget. Among the novelties introduced by this new legislation in the area of copyrights were a publication right (a copyright granted to the publisher of a previously unpublished, no longer copyrighted work; with a period of 25 years from the publication), and the definition of two kinds of contracts: one for copyright transfers, and licenses for granting usage rights. The new law was given retroactive effect by the implementation act, which also specified that the 70-year copyright term was applicable to all works on which the 50-year copyright had not expired yet on January 1, 1993, instead of on January 1, 2004, as had been the case until then.

Russia had committed in a trade agreement with the U.S. in November 2006 to ensure that new legislation, including part IV of the Civil Code, would be fully TRIPS compliant, even if such legislation was passed before an eventual accession of Russia to the WTO.

== International copyright relations ==
International copyright treaties

International copyright is based on national treatment: signatory countries of a treaty are obliged to grant copyright on foreign works according to their own national laws. In the field of "classic" copyright (or author's rights), three main treaties exist:

- The Berne Convention (BC) dates to 1886 and was amended several times. It defined the minimal rights of those who produced creative scientific, literary, and artistic works, prescribing a general minimum duration of copyright of 50 years p.m.a.
- The Universal Copyright Convention (UCC) was adopted in 1952 (and revised in 1971) as a less stringent alternative to the BC for countries who considered the BC too demanding. If a country signed both the UCC and the BC, the BC had precedence in dealings with other BC countries.
- The WIPO Copyright Treaty (WCT) of 1996 became effective in 2002. It was an extension of the BC covering computer programs and databases.

In the field of neighbouring rights, two important treaties are:

- The Rome Convention of 1961 was the equivalent to the BC for performers, phonogram producers, and broadcasting institutions.
- The WIPO Performances and Phonograms Treaty (WPPT) of 1996 entered in force in 2002. It was an update on the Rome Convention.

Additionally, the TRIPS agreement from 1994 defined minimum standards for the protection of intellectual property rights for WTO member countries.

Tsarist Russia and the USSR had a history of near-isolation concerning international copyright relations. Under the Tsars, only a few bilateral copyright treaties with other nations were concluded; these treaties moreover were weak and of short duration. Under Western pressure, Russia planned to join the Berne Convention in the early 20th century, but that was, according to Stoyanovitch, prevented by the outbreak of World War I. The treaties from Tsarist times had all run out by end of the war.

=== International copyright relations of the USSR ===
After the October Revolution, the Soviet Union had no international copyright relations until 1967, when a first treaty with Hungary was concluded. A second treaty with Bulgaria followed 1971. In 1973, the USSR then joined the Universal Copyright Convention (UCC), establishing copyright relations with Western countries. With the accession of the Soviet Union to the UCC, Soviet works published on or after May 27, 1973 became eligible to copyright in all other signatory countries of the UCC. Conversely, foreign works became copyrighted in the Soviet Union by virtue of the UCC if they were published on or after May 27, 1973 and the publication occurred in a UCC country or the author was a citizen of a UCC country.

More bilateral treaties followed, with the German Democratic Republic (effective November 21, 1973), with Poland (October 4, 1974), and with Czechoslovakia (March 18, 1975). The 1967 treaty with Hungary had already been prolonged in 1971 and was again renewed in 1977, the treaty with Bulgaria was renewed in 1975. In 1981, the first bilateral treaty with a Western country was signed: the copyright treaty with Austria entered in force on December 16, 1981. On May 30, 1985, a treaty with Cuba followed, and in 1986 the second treaty with a Western country was concluded with Sweden. All these post-UCC treaties went beyond the provisions of the UCC because they were applied retroactively and explicitly applied also to works published before the USSR had joined the UCC and that were still copyrighted in their source country in 1973. (The treaty with Austria was amended to cover such pre-1973 works in 1989.) On April 19, 1989, another copyright treaty with Madagascar was concluded. The treaty with the German Democratic Republic was rescinded by the USSR on June 2, 1991, following confusions about its continued applicability after the German reunification.

On October 20, 1988, the USSR acceded to the Brussels Convention about measures against the unauthorized (re-)distribution of satellite transmissions. The treaty became effective for Russia from January 20, 1989 on.

=== International copyright relations of Russia ===
When the Soviet Union was dissolved, Russia as the largest successor state adopted all international obligations of the former USSR, including its membership to the UCC. Consequently, Russia was henceforth considered a member of the UCC (in the 1952 Geneva text) since the date of the adherence of the USSR to that treaty, i.e., since May 27, 1973. The membership of the USSR in the Brussels Convention was equally continued by the Russian Federation as from December 25, 1991.

On June 25, 1993, Russia and Armenia signed a treaty on the mutual protection of copyrights. To clarify the copyright situation amongst the states that had made up the former Soviet Union, the CIS nations agreed on a cooperation agreement in the field of copyrights on September 24, 1993. This "Moscow agreement" declared that all signatory countries considered themselves bound by the UCC as of the date the USSR had joined and would confirm this state with the UNESCO, which administered the UCC. The treaty also defined that the treaty states would apply the UCC amongst themselves, also for works published before May 27, 1973 if those works had been copyrighted before this date according to the national laws of the successor states. The intent of the Moscow agreement was to avoid that older Soviet works became copyrighted in only some of the successor states, but would become part of the public domain in some of the others. The 1993 Moscow agreement entered in force in Russia on May 6, 1995.

Also in 1993, Russia and Switzerland concluded a trade agreement in which they granted each other most-favoured-nation status concerning intellectual property rights. This treaty entered in force on July 1, 1995. A comprehensive trade treaty with the European Union that was signed on June 24, 1994, contained similar provisions regarding intellectual property. The intellectual property part of that treaty entered in force on February 1, 1996.

On November 3, 1994, the Russian government announced that the country would join three international treaties in the field of copyrights: the 1971 Paris version of the UCC including its annexes, the Geneva Phonograms Convention on unauthorized duplication and parallel import of phonograms, and the Berne Convention. The accession documents to all three treaties were deposited on December 9, 1994. The UCC (Paris 1971 version) became effective for Russia on March 9, 1995. The Geneva Convention entered in force with respect to Russia on March 13, 1995 and was not retroactive: it covered only phonograms recorded after that date.

==== Berne Convention ====
The Berne Convention also became effective for Russia on March 13, 1995. Russian or Soviet works that were copyrighted on that date became copyrighted in all other Berne Countries on that date.

In its declaration of accession, Russia made a reservation regarding article 18 of the Berne Convention, stating that the treaty "shall not extend to the works which, at the date of entry into force of the said Convention in respect of the Russian Federation, are already in the public domain in its territory." This statement effectively denied the retroactivity of the Berne Convention for foreign works within Russia. This was of some importance because of the issue of foreign works published before May 27, 1973, when the USSR had joined the UCC. Such works had never been eligible to copyright in the Soviet Union or in Russia. Under §18(2) of the Berne Convention, they should have become copyrighted in 1995 because that article only exempted works that once were copyrighted, but on which that copyright already had expired, which didn't apply to pre-1973 foreign works in Russia. The reservation made by Russia used a slightly different phrasing, just stating that works that were in the public domain in Russia in 1995 would not be reprotected. As pre-1973 foreign works were not copyrighted at all and thus in the public domain in Russia in 1995, such foreign works remained in the public domain in Russia.

Russian scholars have disputed this retroactivity issue at length. Gavrilov, for instance, who had argued for the Russian reservation to the Berne Convention, kept defending it, while others disagreed. Maggs and Sergeyev, for instance, pointed out in 2000 that the reservation was inadmissible under article 30(1) of the Berne Convention; Podshibikhin and Leontiev agreed in 2002. The modification of the copyright law through law 72-FL in 2004 refuelled the discussion, because this law added a new paragraph 4 to article 5 of the 1993 copyright law which clearly stated under which conditions foreign works were copyrighted in Russia, using a wording that corresponded in essence to articles 18(1) and 18(2) of the Berne Convention. Although law 72-FL indeed was intended to rescind the non-retroactivity reservation, thereby restoring copyrights on pre-1973 foreign works, the common practice in Russia continued treating pre-1973 foreign works as uncopyrighted.

In 2012 Russia withdrew reservation in its declaration of accession, which was main argument in position of supporters of uncopyrightability of pre-1973 foreign works.

==== Other treaties ====
In 2003, Russia also joined the Rome Convention, the analogue of the Berne Convention for neighbouring rights. The adherence of Russia to the Rome Convention became effective on May 26, 2003. The Rome convention covered performances, phonograms, and broadcasts. The Rome Convention is non-retroactive and applies only to phonograms created after and to performances or broadcasts that occurred after a country jointed the convention (article 20).

After part IV of the Civil Code had entered in force on January 1, 2008, the Russian Federation also acceded on November 5, 2008 to the WIPO Copyright Treaty and to the WIPO Performances and Phonograms Treaty (entry in force of both accessions on February 5, 2009). On August 22, 2012, the Russian Federation also became a member of the World Trade Organization.

=== Copyright on foreign works in the USSR and in Russia ===
Prior to the accession of the Soviet Union to the UCC, only works by foreign authors that were first published in the USSR and unpublished works of foreign authors that existed in an objective form on the territory of the USSR were eligible to copyright. When the USSR joined the UCC in 1973 and the treaty entered in force with respect to the USSR on May 27, 1973, foreign works first published on or after that date outside of the USSR became copyrighted in the Soviet Union if

- the author was a national of any other signatory country of the UCC, irrespective of where this publication occurred, or if
- the work was first published in any other UCC country, regardless of the nationality of the author.

In addition to the UCC, the bilateral treaties the USSR concluded with several countries, amongst them also two Western countries, made works of nationals of these countries eligible for copyright in the Soviet Union, even works published before May 27, 1973. In the case of Austria, Poland, and Sweden, this even applied to any work first published there, irrespective of the nationality of the author.

Since its accession to the Berne Convention in 1995, the following foreign works were copyrighted in Russia:

- Soviet works published in the Russian SFSR, as well as works of authors who became citizens of the Russian federation after the demise of the USSR became subject to the copyright law of the Russian Federation of 1993 (and its amendments) due to the strict territoriality of copyright law.
- Soviet works that were first published in one of the other fourteen republics of the USSR and created by authors who did not become nationals of the Russian Federation were subject to the Russian copyright law per the Moscow agreement.
- Works by nationals of countries that adhered to the Berne Convention, but not to the UCC, or works published in such a country, became eligible to copyright in Russia if they were published on or after March 13, 1995, the date the Berne Convention became effective with respect to Russia.
- Works of nationals of UCC countries, or works first published in such a country (regardless of the author's nationality), were subject to copyright in Russia if the works were first published on or after May 27, 1973. Because of the Russian reservation concerning the retroactivity of the Berne Convention, this applied whether or not the UCC country had also signed the Berne Convention.
- Pre-1973 works of nationals of one of the countries the USSR or Russia concluded bilateral treaties with were subject to copyright in Russia insofar as these treaties remained effective. This concerned works of nationals of Austria, Armenia, Bulgaria, Cuba, the Czech Republic, Hungary, Madagascar, Poland, Slovakia, and Sweden, regardless of the place of first publication. It also applied generally to works first published in Austria, Poland, or Sweden, regardless of the author's nationality, as the bilateral treaties with these states explicitly stated so.

Since the entry in force of federal law 72-FL of August 8, 2004, pre-1973 works subject to the Berne Convention are copyrighted in Russia if they were copyrighted in the source country in 1995. Russia implements the rule of the shorter term: the copyright term in Russia runs to the shorter of the term in the source country and the term granted by Russian law. The amendments made by law 72-FL were also taken over by the new copyright law in Part IV of the Civil Code.

=== Copyright on Soviet and Russian works in other countries ===
Even before the accession of the Soviet Union to the UCC in 1973, some Soviet works were copyrighted in some other countries. One well-known case concerned the actions of the four Soviet composers Shostakovich, Khachaturian, Prokofiev, and Myaskovsky against the movie company 20th Century Fox. While the U.S. courts dismissed their case in Shostakovich v. Twentieth Century-Fox, the French Court of Cassation in 1959 ruled that works of foreign authors were entitled to copyright in France, and that the works of these four Soviet composers were thus copyrighted in France. It found their moral rights violated and ordered the film to be confiscated.

Another way by which Soviet works could become copyrighted outside of the Soviet Union was the smuggling of manuscripts out of the USSR to have the work first published abroad. This practice, known as tamizdat in the Soviet Union, could result in serious repercussions for the authors in the USSR, but was still employed as one of the few ways the governmental censorship could be bypassed. As a side effect, tamizdat works were granted copyright in the foreign country of first publication. If that country was a signatory of the UCC or the Berne Convention, the work was also granted copyright in all other signatories of these treaties, because they both extended copyright to works of citizens of non-member states, if these works were first published in a member state. A very famous case of a tamizdat publication was Boris Pasternak's novel Doctor Zhivago, which, after it had been refused by Soviet publishers, was first published in an Italian translation in Italy in 1957. Because Italy was a member of both the UCC and the Berne Convention, the work was entitled to full copyright in all other member states of these two conventions.

Early Soviet authors sometimes benefited from international copyright on their works just naturally. Maxim Gorky and Sergei Prokofiev, for instance, both had lived for some time abroad and published works in other countries that were members of the Berne Convention. These works of theirs were copyrighted in all other signatory countries of the Berne Convention. After the case of Doctor Zhivago, Soviet publishers became more aware of this possibility to have Soviet works covered by the Berne Convention. Soviet state organizations began to arrange for (simultaneous) first publication of some Soviet works in a country of the Berne Convention. For instance, Mikhail Sholokov's novel They Fought for Their Country was officially first published in Italy.

When the Soviet Union joined to the UCC, all Soviet works published on or after May 27, 1973 became eligible to copyright in all other signatory countries of the UCC. This state persisted until the dissolution of the USSR. When the USSR disintegrated, so did its copyright law. The split into fifteen independent states translated into a split into fifteen independent copyright laws, each with its own jurisdiction defined by the territory of the new successor state of the Soviet Union. Through the Moscow agreement, Soviet works first published in the RSFSR, which were thus subject to the Russian law, became eligible for copyright is all other CIS nations, even if they had been published before 1973.

With the accession of Russia to the Berne Convention, Soviet and Russian works that were copyrighted in Russia in 1995 became copyrighted outside of Russia. By virtue of the retroactivity of the Russian copyright law of 1993, this also included many pre-1973 Soviet works. In the United States, these works became copyrighted on January 1, 1996, the effective date of the U.S. Uruguay Round Agreements Act, if they were still copyrighted in Russia on that date. In the countries that had bilateral treaties with the USSR, pre-1973 Soviet works (from any of the fifteen SSRs) were copyrighted even before.
