= International copyright relations of Russia =

Copyright in Russia
• Copyright law of the Soviet Union
• Copyright law of the Russian Federation
• International copyright relations of Russia

The international copyright relations of Russia were virtually non-existent for much of the Imperial era continuing into the history of the Soviet Union until the Cold War. The Russian Empire had only a few bilateral copyright treaties with other nations were concluded; these treaties moreover were weak and of short duration. The treaties from Imperial times had all expired by the time of the Russian Revolution.

After the October Revolution, the Soviet Union had no international copyright relations until 1967, when a first treaty with Hungary was concluded. In 1973, the USSR then joined the Universal Copyright Convention (UCC), establishing copyright relations with Western countries. More bilateral treaties followed, including two with Western countries (Austria in 1981 and Sweden in 1986), until the government announced its intention to join the Berne Convention in 1989. The USSR was dissolved before that plan could be realized. The Russian Federation acceded to the Berne Convention in 1994; the treaty entered in force in Russia on March 13, 1995.

== Imperial Russia ==
International copyright treaties

International copyright is based on national treatment: signatory countries of a treaty are obliged to grant copyright on foreign works according to their own national laws. In the field of "classic" copyright (or author's rights), three main treaties exist:

- The Berne Convention (BC) dates to 1886 and was amended several times. It defined the minimal rights of those who produced creative scientific, literary, and artistic works, prescribing a general minimum duration of copyright of 50 years p.m.a.
- The Universal Copyright Convention (UCC) was adopted in 1952 (and revised in 1971) as a less stringent alternative to the BC for countries who considered the BC too demanding. If a country signed both the UCC and the BC, the BC had precedence in dealings with other BC countries.
- The WIPO Copyright Treaty (WCT) of 1996 became effective in 2002. It was an extension of the BC covering computer programs and databases.

In the field of neighbouring rights, two important treaties are:

- The Rome Convention of 1961 was the equivalent to the BC for performers, phonogram producers, and broadcasting institutions.
- The WIPO Performances and Phonograms Treaty (WPPT) of 1996 entered in force in 2002. It was an update on the Rome Convention.

Additionally, the TRIPS agreement from 1994 defined minimum standards for the protection of intellectual property rights for WTO member countries.

First international copyright treaties were concluded in Spring 1861 with France and in July 1862 with Belgium. Both treaties provided for reciprocal copyright protection, but were limited to literature only; translation rights were not covered, and censorship was explicitly allowed. Both treaties were abrogated in 1887.

Under Western pressure, new treaties were concluded in 1904 with Germany, in 1905 with France, and in 1906 with Austria-Hungary. After the new copyright law of 1911 was passed, new or renewed treaties were concluded with Germany (1911), France (1911), Belgium (1913/14), and Denmark (1915). All these treaties provided for reciprocal copyright protection and also included the author's translation rights, which were protected for a period of ten years from the original publication of a work. These treaties were of short duration only and expired after three to five years. Tsarist Russia even planned to join the Berne Convention in the early 20th century, but that was, according to Stoyanovitch, prevented by the outbreak of World War I.

== USSR ==
See also Accession of the USSR to the UCC in 1973

After the October Revolution, the Soviet Union initially had no international copyright relations at all. During the period of the New Economic Policy (NEP), the Soviet regime unsuccessfully tried to conclude new bilateral copyright treaties with Great Britain, Germany, and Italy. After these failed attempts, the USSR maintained an isolationist policy in copyright matters until the late 1960s. A first bilateral copyright treaty with Hungary became effective on November 17, 1967, and on October 8, 1971, a second treaty with Bulgaria followed. Both treaties provided for reciprocal copyright protection with a general term of 15 years p.m.a. and also explicitly defined reciprocity for free uses.

On February 27, 1973, the Soviet Union deposited with the UNESCO its declaration of accession to the Geneva version of 1952 of the Universal Copyright Convention (UCC). Three months later, on May 27, 1973, the UCC entered in force with respect to the USSR, establishing copyright relations with Western countries. The USSR timed its accession to the UCC to occur before the 1971 Paris version of the UCC entered in force. Once the Paris version had become effective, accessions to the earlier Geneva version were no longer possible. The USSR would then have been forced to implement the somewhat stronger provisions of the 1971 Paris version, which in particular explicitly recognized an author's exclusive rights to reproduction, performance, and broadcast of a work. Such neighbouring rights did not exist in Soviet law.

With the accession of the Soviet Union to the UCC, Soviet works published on or after May 27, 1973 became eligible to copyright in all other signatory countries of the UCC. Conversely, foreign works became copyrighted in the Soviet Union by virtue of the UCC if they were published on or after May 27, 1973 and the publication occurred in a UCC country or the author was a citizen of a UCC country.

There were initially fears in the West that the Soviet authorities could misuse the provisions of the UCC to censor undesirable works abroad: the regime could compulsorily purchase the copyright on such works without the authors' consent and then sue in foreign courts against the publication of Soviet works abroad, since the copyright would be owned by the state. However, this did not occur. Evidently, the Soviet authorities considered the measures provided by its other laws—in particular articles 70 and 190(1) of the RSFSR Criminal Code on anti-Soviet agitation—sufficient to deal with dissidents without needing to resort to actions based on the copyright law. Furthermore, such actions would have badly damaged the prestige of the USSR abroad, and it was doubtful whether foreign countries would have honored such nationalizations. The U.S. included in its Copyright law of 1976 an article 201(e) that explicitly invalidated all involuntary transfers of copyright. This provision was included in the U.S. Copyright Act of 1976 precisely to prevent attempts of the Soviet government to employ the UCC to censor dissidents' works in the U.S.—although no such attempts had occurred yet and didn't occur afterwards.

Despite having joined the UCC, the Soviet Union continued its policy of bilateral agreements. New treaties with the German Democratic Republic (effective November 21, 1973), Poland (October 4, 1974), and Czechoslovakia (March 18, 1975) were concluded. The 1967 treaty with Hungary had already been prolonged in 1971 and was again renewed in 1977, the treaty with Bulgaria was renewed in 1975. The treaties with Hungary and Czechoslovakia also included a provision for the protection of the moral rights "without limitation in time". In 1981, the first bilateral treaty with a Western country was signed: the copyright treaty with Austria entered in force on December 16, 1981. On May 30, 1985, a treaty with Cuba followed, and in 1986 the second treaty with a Western country was concluded with Sweden. All these post-UCC treaties went beyond the provisions of the UCC because they were applied retroactively and explicitly applied also to works published before the USSR had joined the UCC and that were still copyrighted in their source country in 1973. (The treaty with Austria was amended to cover such pre-1973 works in 1989.) On April 19, 1989, another copyright treaty with Madagascar was concluded. The treaty with the German Democratic Republic was rescinded by the USSR on June 2, 1991, following confusions about its continued applicability after the German reunification.

On October 20, 1988, the USSR acceded to the Brussels Convention about measures against the unauthorized (re-)distribution of satellite transmissions. The treaty became effective for Russia from January 20, 1989 on. Also in 1989, the Soviet government announced its intention to join the Berne Convention, but the USSR was dissolved before that plan could be realized.

The changing economy in the Soviet Union led to the conclusion of a trade treaty between the USSR and the United States, signed by presidents Gorbachev and Bush on June 1, 1990. In this treaty, the U.S. imposed a number of measures in the field of intellectual property in exchange for granting the USSR most-favoured-nation status. The treaty obliged the USSR to accede to the Berne Convention and to implement in its law a neighbouring rights scheme similar to what the Rome Convention laid down. The USSR agreed in the treaty to take substantive steps to amend its legislation in that sense by 1991. The treaty was ratified by the U.S. on December 23, 1991. The Soviet side no longer could do so, but the Russian Federation did so on June 12, 1992.

== Russian Federation ==
When the Soviet Union was dissolved, Russia as the largest successor state adopted all international obligations of the former USSR, including its membership to the UCC. Consequently, Russia was henceforth considered a member of the UCC (in the 1952 Geneva text) since the date of the adherence of the USSR to that treaty, i.e., since May 27, 1973. The membership of the USSR in the Brussels Convention was equally continued by the Russian Federation as from December 25, 1991.

On June 25, 1993, Russia and Armenia signed a treaty on the mutual protection of copyrights. To clarify the copyright situation amongst the states that had made up the former Soviet Union, the Commonwealth of Independent States (CIS) nations agreed on a cooperation agreement in the field of copyrights on September 24, 1993. This "Moscow agreement" declared that all signatory countries considered themselves bound by the UCC as of the date the USSR had joined and would confirm this state with the UNESCO, which administered the UCC. The treaty also defined that the treaty states would apply the UCC amongst themselves, also for works published before May 27, 1973 if those works had been copyrighted before this date according to the national laws of the successor states. This provision was subject to the rule of the shorter term. The intent of the Moscow agreement was to avoid that older Soviet works became copyrighted in only some of the successor states, but would become part of the public domain in some of the others. The 1993 Moscow agreement entered in force in Russia on May 6, 1995.

During the same year, Russia and Switzerland concluded a trade agreement in which they granted each other most-favoured-nation status concerning intellectual property rights, i.e., they agreed to grant the other treaty partner automatically and without conditions any trade advantage they'd grant a third country. This treaty entered in force on July 1, 1995. In a comprehensive trade treaty with the European Union that was signed on June 24, 1994, Russia granted this most-favoured-nation status also to the EU member countries, excepting only trade advantages granted amongst the successor states of the USSR and also those Russia would grant a third country on an effective reciprocal basis. Because the ratification of this treaty was delayed as it had to be ratified by all EU members, an interim agreement containing only the provisions on intellectual property and the most-favoured-nation status was signed on July 17, 1995. It entered in force on February 1, 1996.

On November 3, 1994, the Russian government announced that the country would join three international treaties in the field of copyrights: the 1971 Paris version of the UCC including its annexes, the Geneva Phonograms Convention on unauthorized duplication and parallel import of phonograms, and the Berne Convention. The accession documents to all three treaties were deposited on December 9, 1994. The UCC (Paris 1971 version) became effective for Russia on March 9, 1995. The Geneva Convention entered in force with respect to Russia on March 13, 1995 and was not retroactive: it covered only phonograms recorded after that date.

=== Berne Convention ===
The Berne Convention also became effective for Russia on March 13, 1995. The Berne Convention is retroactive in principle: according to its article 18, it applies to all works that are copyrighted in their source country (the country where the first publication of the work occurred) on the day the treaty enters in force with respect to a joining country such as Russia. Article 18(2) adds that if "through the expiry of the term of protection which was previously granted, a work has fallen into the public domain of the country where protection is claimed, that work shall not be protected anew." Hence works that were copyrighted in Russia on March 13, 1995 became copyrighted in all other Berne Countries on that date. Under these provisions, foreign works not formerly copyrighted in Russia should also have become copyrighted in Russia. Russian legal scholars had warned of this, and the government feared the impacts on the trade balance with Western countries if Russian publishers would suddenly have to pay royalties for foreign works. In its declaration of accession, Russia therefore made a reservation regarding article 18 of the Berne Convention, stating that the treaty "shall not extend to the works which, at the date of entry into force of the said Convention in respect of the Russian Federation, are already in the public domain in its territory." For Russian and Soviet work that originated in Russia, this was just a restatement of article 18(1) of the Berne Convention; but as far as foreign works were concerned, this reservation effectively denied the retroactivity of the Berne Convention within Russia. This was of some importance because of the issue of foreign works published before May 27, 1973, when the USSR had joined the UCC. Such works had never been eligible to copyright in the Soviet Union or in Russia. Under §18(2) of the Berne Convention, they should have become copyrighted in 1995 because that article only exempted works that once were copyrighted, but on which that copyright already had expired, which didn't apply to pre-1973 foreign works in Russia. The reservation made by Russia used a slightly different phrasing, just stating that works that were in the public domain in Russia in 1995 would not be reprotected. As pre-1973 foreign works were not copyrighted at all and thus in the public domain in Russia in 1995, such works remained in the public domain in Russia. Russia thus got rather favorable conditions when it joined Berne Convention: Russian and Soviet works became copyrighted retroactively in other Berne countries, but pre-1973 works from those other countries did not become copyrighted in Russia.

This Russian interpretation was heavily criticized by Western countries and in particular by the United States. Russian scholars, however, repeatedly (and, in the opinion of Elst, rightly) pointed out that there had been a very prominent precedent: in 1989, when the U.S. had joined the Berne Convention, they also had denied the retroactivity of the treaty. From 1989 until 1995, the U.S. only respected the copyrights under the Berne Convention on foreign works from another country that were published on or after the later of that country's adherence date to the Berne Convention and March 1, 1989 (the adherence date of U.S.), and on foreign works from a UCC country according to the provisions of the UCC, which meant on works that were published after the later of September 16, 1955 (the date the UCC entered in force for the U.S. and the other initial signatories) and the adherence date of the foreign UCC country. In the case of Russian or Soviet works, this meant that until 1996, the U.S. continued to recognize only copyrights on Soviet works published after May 27, 1973. The U.S. faced harsh critique for its unilateral denouncement of the retroactivity of the Berne Convention defined in article 18(1) BC. Ultimately, the U.S. had to reverse its position on that issue. It implemented the TRIPS agreement (a precondition to becoming a WTO member) in its Uruguay Round Agreements Act (URAA), which was signed into law on December 8, 1994. The URAA effectively restored the copyright in the U.S. on foreign works on January 1, 1996, if those works were until then not copyrighted in the U.S. because of a failure to meet the U.S. formalities (such as not bearing a copyright notice, or lacking registration with the U.S. Copyright Office) or because of a lack of international treaties between the U.S. and the source country of the work, if the work was still copyrighted in its source country on January 1, 1996.

Russian scholars have disputed this retroactivity issue at length. Gavrilov, for instance, who had argued for the Russian reservation to the Berne Convention, kept defending it, while others disagreed. Maggs and Sergeyev, for instance, pointed out in 2000 that the reservation was inadmissible under article 30(1) of the Berne Convention; Podshibikhin and Leontiev agreed in 2002. The modification of the copyright law through law 72-FL in 2004 refuelled the discussion, because this law added a new paragraph 4 to article 5 of the 1993 copyright law which clearly stated under which conditions foreign works were copyrighted in Russia, using a wording that corresponded in essence to articles 18(1) and 18(2) of the Berne Convention. Nevertheless, Gavrilov continued arguing in favour of the non-protection of pre-1973 foreign works, arguing that this was not so much a reservation to the Berne Convention but merely an interpretation, whereas others considered the 2004 amendments to finally do away with this reservation and claimed that law 72-FL restored copyright in Russia on pre-1973 foreign works. According to the Russian representative at the negotiations on Russia's accession to the WTO, law 72-FL indeed was intended to rescind the non-retroactivity reservation, thereby restoring copyrights on pre-1973 foreign works. The Russian copyright law (already before 2004) also considered international treaties self-executing and to take precedence over the Russian law (article 3). The common practice in Russia nevertheless did not change; pre-1973 foreign works were commonly considered to be uncopyrighted in Russia due to this reservation.

=== Other treaties ===
In 2003, Russia also joined the Rome Convention, the analogue of the Berne Convention for neighbouring rights. The adherence of Russia to the Rome Convention became effective on May 26, 2003. The Rome convention covered performances, phonograms, and broadcasts. For phonograms, it stipulated that phonograms produced by a national of a contracting state, or fixated in a contracting state, or published in a contracting state were covered, but allowed signatory countries to choose among the latter two (article 5). Russia chose to apply the criteria of nationality and publication, declaring the criterion of fixation as inapplicable in its adherence to the treaty. The Rome Convention is non-retroactive and applies only to phonograms created after and to performances or broadcasts that occurred after a country jointed the convention (article 20).

After part IV of the Civil Code had entered in force on January 1, 2008, the Russian Federation also acceded on November 5, 2008 to the WIPO Copyright Treaty and to the WIPO Performances and Phonograms Treaty (entry in force of both accessions on February 5, 2009). On August 22, 2012, the Russian Federation also became a member of the World Trade Organization.

=== 2022 invasion of Ukraine ===
In response to sanctions during the 2022 invasion of Ukraine an unfriendly countries list was developed by Russia. Copyright infringement is authorized for Russian citizens against any country on the unfriendly countries list. The Russian Association for Electronic Communications projects that online piracy in Russia will likely double in 2023. In response, the U.S. Department of Justice and Federal Bureau of Investigation took down Z-Library.

Theatre owners in Russia who are affected by boycotts from Western studios have begun screening foreign films which were downloaded from anonymous BitTorrent sources or whose Digital Cinema Packages were obtained illicitly from friendly neighbouring countries such as Kazakhstan where Russian dubs of foreign films are still legally distributed. Moviegoers who would watch illicitly-screened foreign films in Russia nominally pay tickets for an obscure domestic short film at the box office, with the actual Hollywood feature being screened as a "free preview" to get around bootlegging concerns, though former Prime Minister and later secretary Dmitry Medvedev stated "If Netflix and others have left us, we'll just download their stuff for free," in response to Western content providers' boycott of the Russian entertainment market.

== International copyright ==
The international copyright relations of the Soviet Union and of Russia gave rise to copyright on Soviet works abroad and also to some foreign works becoming copyrighted in the USSR or in Russia. In some cases, Soviet works even became copyrighted in other countries in the absence of any international copyright treaties.

=== Copyright on foreign works in the USSR and in Russia ===
Prior to the accession of the Soviet Union to the UCC, only works by foreign authors that were first published in the USSR and unpublished works of foreign authors that existed in an objective form on the territory of the USSR were eligible to copyright. When the USSR joined the UCC in 1973 and the treaty entered in force with respect to the USSR on May 27, 1973, foreign works first published on or after that date outside of the USSR became copyrighted in the Soviet Union if

- the author was a national of any other signatory country of the UCC, irrespective of where this publication occurred, or if
- the work was first published in any other UCC country, regardless of the nationality of the author.

In addition to the UCC, the bilateral treaties the USSR concluded with several countries, amongst them also two Western countries, made works of nationals of these countries eligible for copyright in the Soviet Union, even works published before May 27, 1973. In the case of Austria, Poland, and Sweden, this even applied to any work first published there, irrespective of the nationality of the author.

Since its accession to the Berne Convention in 1995, the following foreign works were copyrighted in Russia:

- Soviet works published in the Russian SFSR, as well as works of authors who became citizens of the Russian federation after the demise of the USSR became subject to the copyright law of the Russian Federation of 1993 (and its amendments) due to the strict territoriality of copyright law.
- Soviet works that were first published in one of the other fourteen republics of the USSR and created by authors who did not become nationals of the Russian Federation were subject to the Russian copyright law per the Moscow agreement.
- Works by nationals of countries that adhered to the Berne Convention, but not to the UCC, or works published in such a country, became eligible to copyright in Russia if they were published on or after March 13, 1995, the date the Berne Convention became effective with respect to Russia.
- Works of nationals of UCC countries, or works first published in such a country (regardless of the author's nationality), were subject to copyright in Russia if the works were first published on or after May 27, 1973. Because of the Russian reservation concerning the retroactivity of the Berne Convention, this applied whether or not the UCC country had also signed the Berne Convention.
- Pre-1973 works of nationals of one of the countries the USSR or Russia concluded bilateral treaties with were subject to copyright in Russia insofar as these treaties remained effective. This concerned works of nationals of Austria, Armenia, Bulgaria, Cuba, the Czech Republic, Hungary, Madagascar, Poland, Slovakia, and Sweden, regardless of the place of first publication. It also applied generally to works first published in Austria, Poland, or Sweden, regardless of the author's nationality, as the bilateral treaties with these states explicitly stated so.

Pre-1973 foreign works of other countries initially were not covered by copyright in Russia. That changed with federal law 72-FL of August 8, 2004, which brought the Russian copyright law in full compliance with the Berne Convention. Since then, foreign works subject to the Berne Convention are copyrighted in Russia if they were copyrighted in the source country when Russia joined the Berne convention (i.e., in 1995). Russia implements the rule of the shorter term: the copyright term of a foreign work in Russia is the shorter of the copyright term in the source country and the normal 70-years p.m.a. accorded by Russian law. This situation remained unchanged with the entry in force of the new Part IV of the Russian Civil Code which included a complete rewrite of the copyright law; article 1256 embodies the amendments from law 72-FL.

=== Copyright on Soviet and Russian works in other countries ===
Even before the accession of the Soviet Union to the UCC in 1973, some Soviet works were copyrighted in some other countries. One well-known case concerned the actions of the four Soviet composers Shostakovich, Khachaturian, Prokofiev, and Myaskovsky against the movie company 20th Century Fox. 20th Century Fox had published a movie called The Iron Curtain, using music of these four composers as background music and crediting the composers. The four Soviet composers initiated legal actions against the movie company, claiming that the use of their names and music in a movie whose theme was objectionable to them and that was unsympathetic to the Soviet ideology libeled them and violated their civil rights. In the U.S., the courts dismissed these claims in Shostakovich v. Twentieth Century-Fox (80 N.Y.S.2d 575 (N.Y. Sup. Ct. 1948), affirmed, 87 N.Y.S.2d 430 (N.Y. App. Div. 1949)), in particular because the works of these composers were in the public domain in the U.S. at that time because there were no international treaties relating to copyright between the U.S. and the USSR. The compositions themselves also had not been distorted, so the court found that the composers' moral right to the integrity of the work was not violated.

The four plaintiffs also went to court over this issue in France. Up to 1964, the French legislation treated both French authors and foreign authors exactly the same; works of both were granted exactly the same copyright protection. In a lawsuit that was ultimately decided by the French Court of Cassation in 1959, the plaintiffs won: the court ruled that works of foreign authors were entitled to copyright in France, and that the works of these four Soviet composers were thus copyrighted in France. It found their moral rights violated and ordered the film to be confiscated.

Another way by which Soviet works could become copyrighted outside of the Soviet Union was the smuggling of manuscripts out of the USSR to have the work first published abroad. This practice, known as tamizdat in the Soviet Union, could result in serious repercussions for the authors in the USSR, but was still employed as one of the few ways the governmental censorship could be bypassed. As a side effect, tamizdat works were granted copyright in the foreign country of first publication. If that country was a signatory of the UCC or the Berne Convention, the work was also granted copyright in all other signatories of these treaties, because they both extended copyright to works of citizens of non-member states, if these works were first published in a member state. A very famous case of a tamizdat publication was Boris Pasternak's novel Doctor Zhivago, which, after it had been refused by Soviet publishers, was first published in an Italian translation in Italy in 1957. Because Italy was a member of both the UCC and the Berne Convention, the work was entitled to full copyright in all other member states of these two conventions. Pasternak was expelled from the Writers' Union and, after he had been awarded the Nobel Prize in Literature in 1958, forced to decline acceptance of the award.

Early Soviet authors sometimes benefited from international copyright on their works just naturally. Maxim Gorky and Sergei Prokofiev, for instance, both had lived for some time abroad and published works in other countries that were members of the Berne Convention. These works of theirs were copyrighted in all other signatory countries of the Berne Convention. After the case of Doctor Zhivago, Soviet publishers became more aware of this possibility to have Soviet works covered by the Berne Convention. Soviet state organizations began to arrange for (simultaneous) first publication of some Soviet works in a country of the Berne Convention. For instance, Mikhail Sholokov's novel They Fought for Their Country was officially first published in Italy.

When the Soviet Union joined to the UCC, all Soviet works published on or after May 27, 1973 became eligible to copyright in all other signatory countries of the UCC. This state persisted until the dissolution of the USSR. When the USSR disintegrated, so did its copyright law. The split into fifteen independent states translated into a split into fifteen independent copyright laws, each with its own jurisdiction defined by the territory of the new successor state of the Soviet Union. Through the Moscow agreement, Soviet works first published in the RSFSR, which were thus subject to the Russian law, became eligible for copyright is all other CIS nations, even if they had been published before 1973.

Since its accession to the Berne Convention in 1995, the following Russian and Soviet works were copyrighted outside of Russia:

- All works copyrighted in Russia in 1995, when Russia joined the Berne Convention, became copyrighted in other Berne countries. By virtue of the retroactivity of the Russian copyright law of 1993, this also included many pre-1973 Soviet works, namely all works published in 1945 or later and also older works of authors who died or were rehabilitated in 1945 or later (or 1941 for authors who lived during the Great Patriotic War), if these works were first published in the Russian SFSR (or later in Russia) or the author had become a citizen of the Russian Federation after the demise of the Soviet Union.
- All works copyrighted in Russia on January 1, 1996, the effective date of the U.S. Uruguay Round Agreements Act, became copyrighted in the U.S. on that date. This essentially concerned all the same works as above, but using the years 1946 or 1942 instead of 1945 and 1941, respectively.
- In the countries that had bilateral treaties with the USSR, pre-1973 Soviet works (from any of the fifteen SSRs) were copyrighted even before.
