= Copyright law of the Soviet Union =

Copyright in Russia
• Copyright law of the Soviet Union
• Copyright law of the Russian Federation
• International copyright relations of Russia

The Copyright law of the Soviet Union went through several major revisions during its existence. The first Socialist copyright law was passed in 1925. Three years later, it was superseded by a second version that remained in force for more than three decades, until it was replaced in 1961.

Throughout these various revisions of the law, some characteristics remained constant. Copyright was automatic in the USSR: a work was copyrighted from its creation, and registration was not needed. Only creative works expressed in some objective form were subject to copyright. The duration of copyright was much shorter than customary in the West. Copyright was, from the beginning, limited to works of Soviet citizens and to works by foreign authors that were first published in the USSR (or, if unpublished, existed in objective form on the territory of the Soviet Union). The economic rights of authors were limited by a long list of uses that did not constitute copyright infringements, and mandatory official royalty rates limited the income of authors. Soviet copyright law also granted the freedom of translation (until 1973): any work could be freely translated and then published without the original author's consent.

The accession of the USSR to the Universal Copyright Convention, which became effective on May 27, 1973, was a major turning point. Copyright was extended to also cover works of foreign authors that were first published abroad after that date, and the freedom of translation had to be abolished. For the first time in history, Russia (as a republic within the Soviet Union) had joined a multilateral, international copyright treaty, ending the country's self-imposed isolation (but also its independence) in copyright matters.

During Perestroika, the law and the administrative procedures were changed piece by piece, relaxing the governmental control over authors' exercises of their copyright. The official royalty rates were dropped, and the state monopoly on foreign trade on copyrights was abolished. Authors for the first time could legally negotiate publication contracts with foreign publishers themselves. A new, profoundly revised Soviet copyright law was passed in 1991, but the Soviet Union was dissolved before it could enter in force.

== Revolutionary Copyright ==
The old Tsarist Copyright law of 1911 was not immediately invalidated after the October Revolution. The old law, with its copyright term of 50 years after the author's death and its possibility of transferring copyrights in their entirety from an author to a publisher, continued to be valid initially. But the nationalizations in all areas of the economy soon considerably restricted the avenues through which an author could publish her or his work, even if her or his copyright remained initially untouched. All publishing activities were placed under the supervision of the State Publishing house by a decree of May 21, 1919. On July 29, 1919, the government declared a state monopoly on unpublished works of deceased authors; and on April 20, 1920, all books (including those in private possession) were nationalized, except those in public libraries. Theatres and film studios as well as the photographic industry were nationalized in August 1919. Private publishing houses were eventually liquidated as well. The right to translate foreign publications into Russian was also monopolized by the government.

=== Nationalizations of works ===
In the interest of public education, the new Communist regime wanted to widely (and inexpensively) disseminate classic Russian literature to the masses. Toward this end, a decree was issued December 29, 1917 (Gregorian date) enabling the People's Commissariat for Education to nationalize works of deceased authors (including composers). On February 14, 1918, the works of 58 deceased authors were nationalized—including, among others, Chekhov, Chernyshevsky, Dostoyevsky, Gogol, Herzen, Lermontov, Pushkin, Tolstoy, and Turgenev. The government established a state monopoly on the publication of these authors' works for a period of five years, which was later extended by another five years. A second nationalization decree of November 26, 1918 extended the powers of the People's Commissariat for Education to nationalize also works of living authors. The decree granted the commissariat a perpetual monopoly to the publication rights of such nationalized works; living authors were to receive royalties based on the standard remuneration schedules established by the government, while the royalties on works by deceased authors went to the state. Based upon this second decree, a number of nationalizations occurred in the following years. On August 16, 1919, the works of the seventeen composers Arensky, Borodin, Tchaikovsky, Balakirev, Cui, Kalinnikov, Laroche, Lyadov, Mussorgsky, Rimsky-Korsakov, Rubinstein, Sakketi, Scriabin, Serov, Smolensky, Stasov, and Taneyev were nationalized. On January 18, 1923, the works of Mikhail Bakunin and 46 further authors were nationalized. A third decree on May 14, 1925 nationalized the works of Georgi Plekhanov and also the Russian translations of the works of Upton Sinclair, and finally, on June 28, 1927, the Marx-Engels Institute was granted a publication monopoly on the works of Karl Marx and Friedrich Engels.

=== Legislative changes ===
Legislative decrees invalidated some—but not all—of the provisions of the Tsarist copyright law. In the context of the general abolition of legal and testimonial succession rights, the nationalization decree of November 26, 1918 also reduced the copyright term from the 50 years p.m.a. (Latin: post mortem auctoris—"after the author's death") of the Tsarist copyright law to the lifetime of the author. Assignments of copyrights in their entirety were invalidated by a decree of October 10, 1919. Under the Tsarist law, an author could transfer his copyrights to a publisher; under Soviet doctrine, this was not possible: an author could only grant a publisher a time-limited publication right, a principle that would hold throughout the existence of the Soviet Union. Furthermore, the contracts to be used were standardized and a fixed schedule for royalties was defined by a decree of October 25, 1918.

Copyright in itself was upheld, though: works that had not been nationalized could only be used or reproduced with the consent of the author. Nationalized works could only be published with the consent of the People's Commissariat for Education, to which a publisher also had to pay a fee according to a fixed schedule.

== Copyright Act of 1925 ==
The legal situation concerning copyright in the Soviet Union in the early 1920s was confused. The Tsarist copyright law was still partially in effect, but its status was unclear. There were a number of decrees affecting copyright, but there was no unified legal treatment. The new Civil Law of the Russian SFSR, which became effective on January 1, 1923, did not contain any provisions on copyright either. In 1924, the Council of People's Commissars launched a project to develop a new copyright statute. On January 30, 1925, the Central Executive Committee passed the new Fundamentals of Copyright Law. These "Fundamentals" (Osnovy—Основы) were to serve as a model law for the laws of the individual republics of the Soviet Union, which all—with the exception of the Ukrainian SSR—passed laws implementing the Fundamentals at the republic level in 1925/26; the RSFSR Copyright Act was passed on October 11, 1926. All these republics' laws did not deviate from the Fundamentals. Only in the Azerbaijan SSR were the copyright provisions included in the Civil Code of the republic; in all other SSRs, the act was a separate ad-hoc piece of legislation.

The 1925 Copyright Act provided for a general copyright term of 25 years since the first publication of a work. If an author died before that period had expired, the heirs were granted the right to receive royalties according to the schedules established by the government for the shorter of the remaining part of the 25-year term or during 15 years. If a work was published after the author's death, this right was limited to a term of 15 years from the posthumous publication. For some specific classes of works, such as encyclopedias, photographs, or also choreographic and pantomimic works the copyright term was shorter than the general 25-year period.

The law recognized the exclusive right of the author to publish, reproduce, and distribute his work, and also his right to remuneration, i.e., the right to receive royalties for uses of a work. The law included provisions enabling authors to transfer copyrights for a limited time (five years) to a publisher by contract; only publishing contracts with state, trade union, or Party publishing houses could be of unlimited duration. The contract had to specify precisely the intended use of the work, the number of copies printed, the royalties to be paid, etc. The allowed range of the amount of royalties was prescribed in governmental remuneration schedules.

The copyrights of an author were limited by a large array of free uses allowed without the author's consent. Amongst these free uses was the "freedom of translation", which had already existed in the old Tsarist copyright law. A translation of any work could be done without the author's consent, and the translator was granted a separate and independent copyright on the translation. This provision was, already before Soviet times, motivated by the desire to ensure an economically viable way to translate works between the many national languages of the country. A decree on March 16, 1927 clarified that radio broadcasts of theater or concert performances were also admissible free uses. Compulsory licenses also existed in the 1925 Copyright Act. Public performances of a published work, for instance, were allowed without the author's consent, but were subject to the payment of the standard royalties. The government also reserved the right to forcibly nationalize any work.

Another characteristic that Soviet copyright law inherited from the Tsarist law was that copyright was automatic: copyright began with the creation of the work (not its completion or publication), and was not subject to registration. Copyright covered all literary and musical works as well as works of the arts and scientific works and also films by Soviet citizens, as well as works by foreign authors that were first published in the Soviet Union or, if unpublished, existed there in some objective form, irrespective of the author's nationality. An "objective form" was any form that permitted the reproduction of the work without any involvement of the original author. Only creative works were subject to copyright; works of a purely technical nature such as telephone directories, business correspondence, accountants' statements, but also court decisions or decrees, did not fall under copyright. Soviet courts interpreted this creativity requirement liberally; requiring only a minimal creative effort. A work created by a minimal paraphrase of an existing text could already be considered a new work eligible to copyright.

== 1928 Fundamentals ==
Implementation of the 1928 Fundamentals in the republics of the USSR
Turkmen SSR	September 26, 1928
Russian SFSR	October 8, 1928
Byelorussian SSR	January 14, 1929
Ukrainian SSR	February 6, 1929
Georgian SSR	August 30, 1929
Armenian SSR	February 10, 1930
Uzbek SSR	October 14, 1936
Azerbaijan SSR	?
Kazakh SSR	applied the law of the RSFSR
Kirgiz SSR	ditto
Tajik SSR	ditto
Lithuanian SSR	ditto
Estonian SSR	ditto
Moldavian SSR	applied the law of Ukrainian SSR
Latvian SSR	May 22, 1941

After only three years, new Fundamentals of Copyright Law superseded the 1925 version. The new Fundamentals were passed on May 16, 1928, and again the Union republics implemented them by passing their own compliant copyright acts afterwards. The 1928 law was similar to the 1925 one. It maintained the author's exclusive rights to publish, reproduce, distribute, and perform his works, and also his right to derive an income from such uses of his work. It took over from the 1925 law the list of free uses, including the freedom of translation, and also the cases involving compulsory licenses. The government reserved the right to nationalize a work without consent of the author. In practice, an author's exclusive rights to publish and distribute his works was restricted by the requirement to do so through official channels and by the state monopoly over the printing and publishing industries.

The copyright term was changed from 25 years following the first publication of a work to the lifetime of the author plus 15 years (15 years p.m.a.). This change was applied retroactively also to works that had already entered the public domain under the old term. Upon the death of an author, copyright passed onto his heirs or other legal successors. For certain kinds of works, shorter copyright terms applied. Periodicals, encyclopedias, choreographic works, movies and movie scripts, and collections of photographs were copyrighted for ten years from their first publication. Individual photographs were copyrighted for five years since their publication. Photographs were only copyrighted if they bore the name of the studio or the photographer, the address, and the year.

Individual republics of the USSR were free to devise their own rules for standard publication contracts and royalty schedules. Royalty collection and payment was centralized through a state agency founded in 1932 and named in 1938 the "All-Union Administration for the Protection of Copyrights", (VUOAP – Vsesoiuznoe upravlenie po ochrane avtorskich prav; Всесоюзное управление по охране авторских прав, ВУОАП). The VUOAP was placed under the auspices of the Union of Soviet Writers and managed literary works. Similar collecting societies existed for other kinds of works, such as compositions, movies, or works of the visual arts.

Under the 1928 Copyright Act, courts did not grant any damage claims by private persons for copyright infringement. The payment of fines to citizens instead of to the state was seen as contrary to communist doctrine. When damages were granted, they were to be paid to the state. Furthermore, the courts limited damage claims in copyright infringement cases to the sums defined by the existing standard schedules of remuneration issued by the government. If no schedule existed, no damages were awarded at all, even if the works were confirmed to be copyrighted.

Although Soviet law, from 1925 on until the demise of the Soviet Union (and also beyond in the successor states of the USSR), has always maintained that copyrights existed on a work regardless of its purpose or its value, the exercise of copyright in the Soviet Union was subject to the rules of censorship and the literary controls, the press legislation, the laws on printing, publishing, and selling, and Party directives. In general, only authors of "socially useful" works could exploit their copyrights; on "useless works" such as Church hymns no economic rights could be enforced; and authors of undesirable works faced administrative, or social, or even penal sanctions. What was "socially useful" was defined in a number of Party decrees (from 1925 to 1963, there were thirty-three such decrees). Publishers, film studios, and so on, were expected to refuse to publish works that were considered non-compliant to the currently valid definitions of the goals of artistic activity as defined by these decrees. In this way, the nominally exclusive rights of authors to publication were restricted by the need to go through the official channels and state-controlled publishing houses. As a way to bypass this governmental control for literary works samizdat developed: the non-commercial dissemination of a work in chain-letter fashion through carbon-copies produced by readers on their typewriters. Many samizdat works were considered to be "anti-Soviet agitation" by the authorities and the authors were prosecuted under article 58(10) (later articles 70 and 190(1)) of the RSFSR Criminal Code or corresponding provisions of the other republics' penal laws.

The copyright law of 1928 remained in effect essentially unchanged for more than thirty years. The numerous copyright-related decrees issued during this time concerned mostly administrative matters, such as the definition of the standard author's contracts for publication or the standard royalty tariffs. In 1957, a decree declared that for a posthumously rehabilitated author, the copyright term of 15 years was to begin to run at the date of his rehabilitation, not at the date of his death.

== 1961 Fundamentals ==
In 1961, the copyright law of the Soviet Union was completely restructured. For the first time, copyright law was incorporated into the federal Civil Code and no longer formed a separate piece of legislation. On December 8, 1961, the Supreme Soviet of the USSR passed the Fundamentals of Civil Legislation, which entered in force on May 1, 1962. The eleven articles of Chapter IV of these Fundamentals covered the copyright law. The overhaul of the copyright law was to settle doctrinal disputes by clarifying the old law and to adapt the law to the current practice. Again, these new Fundamentals of Civil Legislation formed a statutory framework only (what is called a loi-cadre in French, or a Rahmengesetz in German); the fifteen Union republics then passed their own legislation in conformity with this union-wide framework. New republic laws entered in force in all republics in 1964/65; in the RSFSR, the new Russian Civil Code, including the copyright provisions of chapter IV, became effective on June 11, 1964. All these republics' laws were very similar, there were only minor differences.

=== Extent of copyright ===
The 1961 Fundamentals recognized two distinct classes of rights an author was granted under copyright, termed "personal rights" and "property rights" in Soviet legal doctrine. Personal rights comprised the right of attribution (i.e., to be named as the author), the right to maintain the integrity of a work, and the right to publish, reproduce, and distribute a work. The property rights essentially were the right to derive material benefits if a work was used. The personal rights were no longer declared "exclusive" rights of the author. Soviet legal theorists had argued since the 1930s that despite the text of the 1928 Fundamentals, an author actually did not enjoy exclusive publishing rights on his works and could not publish his works himself, but was only entitled to receive remuneration if the official bodies approved the publication of a work.

Copyright was automatic and not subject to registration; in fact, a long-ignored registration paragraph of the 1928 law had been abolished already in 1959. Copyright arose with the creation of the work. As before, the only requirements for a copyright were that the work was creative and existed in an objective form on the territory of the USSR. If a work met these two conditions, it was copyrighted regardless of the nationality of the author. Works of Soviet authors were copyrighted in all cases, even if they existed only abroad or were first published outside of the Soviet Union. The list of copyrightable works in the law was only indicative, but included explicitly for the first time also sound recordings ("mechanical or magnetic recording"). Oral works such as speeches were copyrightable works, although such copyrights were virtually unenforceable in practice and largely nullified anyway by a "free use" provision allowing their free reproduction. Architectural works were also copyrighted, but that copyright extended only to the plans, blueprints, and models, not to the actual building itself. Photographs still were subject to the rule from the 1928 Fundamentals that they needed to be marked with the name of the studio, its address, and the year in order to be copyrighted. Employees for the first time were granted a copyright on works they created as part of their duties, but their right to remuneration was limited to their salary. Legal documents and in general works created by civil servants in their line of duty were not subject to copyright.

The Fundamentals defined that copyright lasted throughout the life of the author; individual republics of the union were free to define shorter terms. The Fundamentals also contained provisions dealing with the inheritance of copyright, and indeed the RSFSR defined in its 1964 Civil Code implementation of the fundamentals a general copyright term of 15 years p.m.a. The shorter terms for certain classes of works that had been defined by the previous Fundamentals of 1928 were abandoned. The personal rights of authorship and to the integrity of the work did not pass to the heirs; these rights were perpetually linked to the author and enforced after the authors' death by VUOAP. Heirs of an author could inherit copyright; their rights essentially comprised the right to be remunerated for uses of the work. In the RSFSR, the maximum royalties heirs were entitled to had been limited already by two decrees in 1957/58 to 50% of the standard royalty schedule. This limit was in 1961 prescribed on a union-wide basis in article 105 of the Fundamentals. Another RSFSR decree from 1962 went even further and reduced the royalties of heirs of authors of non-fictional works to 20% of the standard tariff.

Under the 1961 Fundamentals, legal entities such as companies could also hold copyrights. Examples of such corporate copyright ownership included photo studios who held the copyright on their photos, publishers of encyclopedias or periodicals, who held a copyright on the compilation as a whole, film studios, who owned the copyrights on movie scripts and the movies they produced, and select news agencies (TASS, on January 15, 1935, was granted the copyright on all the information it disseminated. Novosti was later also granted this right.). In the case of compilations such as encyclopedias or periodicals, the publishing company owned only a copyright on the work in its entirety; the copyright on the individual contributions that made up the compilation remained with the individual authors. Copyrights held by legal entities were defined to be perpetual; if a company was reorganized, its legal successor entity took over the copyrights, and if a company ceased to exist, the copyrights passed to the state.

=== Limitations of copyright ===
The 1961 Fundamentals, like its predecessor laws, allowed for a wide selection of free uses and compulsory licenses, subject only to the attribution of the original author of a work. Free uses of a work allowed anyone to use a published, copyrighted work without the original author's consent and without the payment of royalties, while compulsory licenses were those cases where the use was also allowed without the author's consent, but only if royalties were paid. The free uses comprised:

- The permission to create new, creatively independent derived works (article 103(1)). Excepted were only the adaptation of a literary work into a drama or a film and the making of a film from a play, as well as the two inverse cases.
- The permission to reproduce published scientific, artistic, or literary works as excerpts (or even entirely) in scientific, critical, or educational publications (article 103(2)).
- The permission to use scientific, artistic, or literary works in news reporting (article 103(3)).
- The permission to use scientific, artistic, literary, or oral works (speeches) in film, radio, and on television, provided the original work existed already in a form amenable to such use. (article 103(4)).

Among the free uses, the 1961 Fundamentals also maintained the freedom of translation, but the translator was newly required to maintain the meaning and the integrity of the original work (article 102). The Civil Code of the RSFSR of 1964 contained an additional free use provision in article 493 that allowed the reproduction or other use of a published work for personal purposes.

There were four compulsory licenses in the 1961 Fundamentals:

- The performance of published dramatic, musical, and literary works was allowed without the author's consent. Since a performance constituted "publication" under Soviet law, an author's contract was only needed for the first performance of a hitherto unpublished work.
- Previously published works could be recorded by any means for the purpose of public reproduction or circulation of the work without the author's consent. (Recordings for the use in film, radio, and on television were already covered by the free use in article 103(4).)
- A composer could use a published literary work to compose a musical work with lyrics without the consent of the author of the text. When the composition was performed or recorded, the author of the text was entitled to royalties.
- Artistic or photographic works could be used in industrial articles without the original author's consent (and in this case, even his name needed not be given). This provision was intended for the manufacturing of items such as wallpapers or fabrics; it did not permit industrial mass-copying of a work (such as a sculpture).

Finally, the government also continued to reserve the right of compulsory purchase of copyrights, but this right was not often exercised. It was employed mostly to prevent "unjustified enrichment" of the heirs of authors of successful works.

== Accession to the UCC in 1973 ==
The Universal Copyright Convention

The Universal Copyright Convention (UCC) was developed under the lead of the UNESCO as an international copyright treaty that offered an alternative to the Berne Convention. The initial version of the UCC was adopted in Geneva on September 6, 1952; it entered in force on September 16, 1955. Before this, between 1917 and 1950, approximately one billion foreign books that were protected by copyright were published. A revision of the UCC was adopted in Paris on July 24, 1971 and entered in force on July 10, 1974. These changes concerned the introduction of special advantages for developing countries and the explicit acknowledgment of an author's exclusive rights to reproduction, performance, and broadcast of a work.

The UCC was designed to demand less stringent copyright requirements than the Berne Convention with the goal of achieving international copyright recognition for countries that considered the Berne Convention too demanding. The UCC required a minimum general copyright term of 25 years p.m.a. or, for works where copyright began upon the publication, of 25 years since the first publication. Shorter durations were allowed for a few kinds of works. The UCC gave signatory countries more leeway than the Berne Convention to keep the idiosyncrasies of their laws (such as requirements for copyright registrations, or a two-term scheme as it was used until 1978 in the United States). The UCC applied only to works that were not permanently in the public domain in the country where copyright was claimed. The provisions of the Berne Convention supersede those of the UCC in countries that are signatories of both treaties. Of all the signatory countries of the UCC by 2006, only Laos was not also a signatory of the Berne Convention.

On February 27, 1973, the Soviet Union joined the Geneva version of 1952 of the Universal Copyright Convention (UCC). The UCC became effective in the USSR on May 27, 1973. Until then, the USSR had not participated in any multilateral international copyright treaties; it had only concluded two bilateral contracts with Hungary (in 1967) and Bulgaria (in 1971). The USSR timed its accession to the UCC to occur before the 1971 Paris version of the UCC entered into force. Once the Paris version had become effective, accessions to the earlier Geneva version were no longer possible. The USSR would then have been forced to implement the somewhat stronger provisions of the 1971 Paris version, which in particular explicitly recognized an author's exclusive rights to reproduction, performance, and broadcast of a work.

By virtue of the UCC, foreign works first published after May 27, 1973 outside of the USSR became copyrighted in the Soviet Union if

- the author was a national of any other signatory country of the UCC, irrespective of where this publication occurred, or if
- the work was first published in any other UCC country, regardless of the nationality of the author.

Soviet works first published after this date also became copyrighted in other UCC countries.

On February 21, 1973, six days before the USSR deposited its declaration of accession to the UCC, the Presidium of the Supreme Soviet of the USSR enacted a series of amendments to chapter IV of the 1961 Fundamentals to bring the Soviet copyright law in line with the minimum requirements the UCC imposed. The Union republics adapted their own laws accordingly; the RSFSR as the largest of the republics did so on March 1, 1974. In 1978, the USSR declared its agreement with the use of Soviet copyrighted works in developing countries according to the rules laid down in the 1971 Paris edition of the UCC.

=== Adaptation of the Soviet law ===
Since the UCC prescribed a minimum copyright term of 25 years, chapter IV of the Fundamentals was changed accordingly. Copyright henceforth ran generally for the lifetime of the author plus 25 years, only for photographic works and works of applied art, there were shorter terms in some of the republics. In the Georgian SSR, these kinds of works were copyrighted for 20 years since their publication or creation, in the Moldavian and Uzbek SSR, for 15 years, and in Azerbaijan for ten years. In Kazakhstan, photographic works were protected for ten years and collections of photos for 15 years. These reduced terms took advantage of a provision in the UCC that set a minimum term of ten years since publication for these kinds of works. The law of the Russian SSR did not contain any such reduced copyright terms for these kinds of works. The new, longer copyright term only applied to works that were still copyrighted in the USSR in 1973.

Copyrights could be inherited. The rights of heirs and other legal successors were restored: they were entitled to receive the full royalties on a work. The reduced rates for heirs of at most 50% of the standard schedule were abandoned, but increased taxation of royalties received by heirs offset this benefit again. If no heirs existed, or the author had disinherited them or had willed his works to the state, copyright ceased with the author's death (this had already been the case under the 1961/1964 laws). Parallel to the new laws, the republics also issued new royalty schedules, generally with decreasing remuneration scales: an author was, for instance, entitled to more money on the first print run than on subsequent runs.

Another major change was that the freedom of translation was revoked. Translations were from 1973 on subject to the consent of the copyright owner of the original work. The copyright on a translation belonged to the translator.

In exchange, two new free uses were included in the law in 1973. The first was a very broad free use permission allowing newspapers to reproduce any published report or scientific, artistic, literary, or oral work; either in the original or as a translation. This broad permission was exploited by some publications such as Literaturnaya Gazeta, which published on October 24, 1973 long translated excerpts of Marilyn, Norman Mailer's biography of Marilyn Monroe, and again on January 1, 1974 a large translated excerpt from Breakfast of Champions by Kurt Vonnegut. This practice caused sufficient negative publicity for the USSR in the West that Soviet publishers purchased the publication rights in Russian language on these works shortly afterwards.

The second new free use provision permitted non-commercial reproduction of printed works for scientific or educational purposes. According to Newcity, this permission was limited to reproduction by photocopying. In 1976, another additional free use permission was added, which allowed free republication in Braille of a published work.

=== Licensing ===
Until 1973, copyright in the Soviet Union was non-transferable. Authors could not sign away their copyrights; they only could grant a publisher a limited right to use a work for a specific purpose for a limited time (typically five years). For publication, authors had to use standard authors' contracts that were prescribed by the government. Slightly different standard contracts existed for different kinds of works, but they all shared this same basic characteristic. In all cases, the intended use of the work by a publisher was exactly described (e.g. including the size of a print run for print publications), and if the publisher accepted the delivered work, he was obliged to actually publish it within a set time frame (the first edition had to appear after at most one or two years, depending on the kind of work).

When the Soviet Union joined the UCC, a new type of freely negotiable licences was introduced to facilitate dealing with publishers abroad, and in particular in the West. Copyrights, especially the right to publish a work, became transferable through these licenses. The intention clearly was that the old-style authors' contracts were to be used amongst Soviet partners for domestic publication, whereas the new licensing scheme was to be employed towards foreign publishers. Upon a decree of August 16, 1973, the "All-Union Agency on Copyrights" (VAAP – Vsesoiuznoe agentstvo po avtorskim pravam; Всесоюзное агентство по авторским правам, ВААП) was founded on September 20, 1973. The VAAP replaced the several previously existing collecting societies (such as the VUOAP), taking over their tasks and additionally managing copyrights on foreign works in the USSR and also the copyrights on Soviet works abroad. Officially, the VAAP was a non-governmental organization sponsored by creative unions (such as the Union of Soviet Writers) and seven state organs; but for all practical purposes, it was a state agency. All contracts with foreign publishers had to be concluded through VAAP; authors were forbidden to negotiate directly with foreign publishers. In the standard authors' publishing contracts, an author transferred the right to use the work abroad to the first publisher; and publishers were also obliged to go through VAAP for international copyright deals. The VAAP held the state monopoly on the import and export of copyrights. Only the state organs for cinematography (Goskino, through its Soveksportfilm agency) and television and radio broadcasts (Gosteleradio), as well as the news agency Novosti were exempted from that monopoly, but even they had to register all contracts with foreign partners with VAAP.

The accession to the UCC caused a dual system in Soviet copyright law, with the effect that foreign works published after May 27, 1973, were actually granted a stronger copyright protection than Soviet works because for foreign works the definition of the UCC of "publication" applied, which was narrower than the definition of "publication" in Soviet law, which continued to be applied to Soviet works. The duality was also emphasized by the new licensing scheme. In the years following the accession to the UCC, considerable doctrinal confusion ensued amongst Soviet scholars on how to reconcile such dual treatment with the Soviet ideology or ideals. Scholars proposed further changes and clarifications beyond the changes necessary to conform to the UCC. Elst concludes that the accession to the UCC questioned the internal consistency of Soviet law and undermined several of its basic principles, and that the myriad of improvement suggestions by scholars actually caused new legal uncertainties.

== 1991 Fundamentals ==
Gorbachev's Perestroika also had repercussions on the copyright law. From 1987 to 1990, a number of decrees modified the legislation on copyright and related areas. New remuneration rates that defined much higher royalties than the previous schedules were issued in 1987; the decreasing scales were given up at the same time: the royalties for all subsequent printings of a work were defined uniformly to amount to 70% of the rates for the first publication. Important changes occurred two years later, when the monopoly of the VAAP on foreign trade in copyrights was broken. Authors henceforth could negotiate directly with foreign publishers; and even the clause in the mandatory model contracts for publication that assigned this right from the author to his publisher was abolished. Likewise, Soviet publishers were free to negotiate with foreign authors or publishers licenses to publish foreign works in the Soviet Union.

Also in 1987, a work group tasked with adapting the Soviet copyright law to a market economy was formed. In early 1990, the work group presented a draft for a revised section IV of the Fundamentals on copyright and a new section IV A on neighbouring rights. But the proposal, comprising 32 articles, remained unused; the Supreme Soviet's Committee for legislation published in March 1990 its own draft version of the new Fundamentals that ignored many of the innovations found in the work group's proposal. This draft was, with some modifications, passed as law on March 31, 1991. Despite the briefness of chapter IV of the new 1991 Fundamentals—it consisted of only 10 articles, of which 2 covered neighbouring rights and one was on measures against copyright infringements—it was a radical break with the previous practice.

The new law aimed at harmonizing the Soviet republics' copyright laws, which had in some areas drifted apart over the years. This was achieved by making the 1991 Fundamentals more explicit and giving the republics less leeway to devise their own rules.

The author of a work again was granted a set of exclusive rights: the personal (or moral) rights to authorship, name, and the integrity of the work, and the property (or economic) rights to the work: the right to publish or use the work, and the right to remuneration for use of the work or for granting permission to use the work. A "use" of a work was defined by a non-exhaustive list that included broadcasting, performance, modification, adaptation, recording, and distribution. "Publication" was clearly defined to be subject to the author's permission.

The initial copyright owner in all cases was the "citizen" (i.e., the natural person) who had created the work. The copyright of legal entities was abolished; publishers of scientific collections or encyclopedias as well as film studios were only granted a derived right to use the work in its entirety, subject to the remuneration of the authors. For works made for hire, the employer was granted a similar right to use the work, limited to at most three years since the delivery of the work. Shorter terms could be defined contractually. The state's authors' contracts for publication were no longer mandatory, and the upper limits to remuneration were dropped: contractual freedom was established.

The copyright term was extended from 25 years to generally 50 years p.m.a. for all kinds of works, and the law for the first time made explicit that no formalities were required for a work to be copyrighted. Anonymous or pseudonymous works were copyrighted for 50 years since their initial publication, unless the real identity of the author became known during that time and thus 50 years p.m.a. applied. The moral rights to authorship, name, and integrity of the work were perpetual; and authors could only transfer usage rights on a work (but not their right to remuneration for such uses, which always remained a personal right of the author).

The list of free uses was reduced considerably, and the remaining allowed free uses were defined much more narrowly than before. Similar to fair use, any such free use was only allowed if it didn't infringe upon the normal exploitation of the work or the legitimate interests of the author. Compulsory licenses were abolished altogether.

Neighbouring rights were introduced for the first time in Soviet legislation. Broadcasters, performers, and producers of phono- or videograms were granted exclusive neighbouring rights for a period of 50 years since the first broadcast, performance, or distribution of a phono- or videogram. They were also granted—in excess of the provisions of the Rome Convention—the moral rights to name and integrity of the work.

Before the new 1991 Fundamentals could enter in force on January 1, 1992, the USSR had been dissolved. The provisions of the 1991 legislation never became effective in the Soviet Union.

== Transition to post-Soviet legislation in Russia ==
In Russia, the Supreme Soviet of the Russian Federation passed a decree that made the USSR 1991 Fundamentals effective in Russia from August 3, 1992 on, insofar as these Fundamentals contradicted neither the Constitution of the Russian Federation nor other legislative acts of Russia passed after June 12, 1990, and only on a temporary basis until the Russian Federation would have adopted a new, own Civil Code. The original USSR executive decree for the 1991 Fundamentals, which laid down the transitory provisions, did not enter in force in Russia, though, and the old Russian Civil Code remained in force insofar as it didn't contradict the 1991 Fundamentals. Section IV of the 1991 Fundamentals was thus in effect for exactly one year until on August 3, 1993, the new Copyright law of Russia entered in Force.

That new Russian law had a general copyright term of 50 years p.m.a. and was retroactive, restoring copyright on works on which the shorter Soviet copyright terms had already expired and even copyrighting works that had until then not been considered copyrightable works at all (such as performances, which under the 1993 law were subject to a neighbouring right that had not existed under Soviet legislation). The new Russian copyright terms from the 1993 law became applicable to all works of authors who had died 1943 or later, or to works published in 1943 or later. For authors who had lived and worked during the Great Patriotic War, the copyright term was extended by four years; the corresponding year for such authors and their works was thus 1939. For work first published after the death of the author, the term started at the posthumous publication of the work, and for posthumously rehabilitated authors, the copyright term of the 1993 law began to run with their rehabilitation, making it possible that even older works were placed under copyright again in these cases—examples include the works of Boris Pilniak (executed in 1938, rehabilitated in 1957), Isaac Babel (executed 1940, rehabilitated 1954), or also Osip Mandelstam (died 1938, rehabilitated 1956/1987). Other authors on whose works copyright was restored were Anna Akhmatova (died 1966), Vera Mukhina (died 1953, sculptor of the statue "Worker and Kolkhoz Woman"), Aleksey Shchusev (died 1949, architect of the Lenin Mausoleum), Aleksey Tolstoy (died 1945), and many others. An extreme example is Mikhail Bulgakov's The Master and Margarita: the work was first published posthumously in 1966. At that time, the Soviet copyright term of then 15 years p.m.a. had already expired as Bulgakov had died in 1940. The new Russian copyright law from 1993 placed this work under copyright again, because the 50-year term was calculated from 1966 on.

The old Soviet law was thus rendered largely obsolete in Russia; it remained applicable only to copyright violations that had occurred before August 3, 1993.
