= Givi Orjonikidze =

Georgian music critic, publicist and scholar (1929–1984)

Givi Orjonikidze (German: Givi Ordzhonikidze; Georgian: გივი ორჯონიკიძე; June 9, 1929, Tbilisi – May 17, 1984, Moscow) was a Georgian music critic, publicist and scholar. He served as the chairman of the Georgian Composers’ Union from 1974 to 1984. Giya Kancheli’s liturgy “Mourned by the Wind” is dedicated to the memory of Givi Orjonikidze.

== Biography ==
Givi Orjonikidze was born in Tbilisi, Georgian SSR. In 1937, during the Great Purge, his father Shio Orjonikidze, a party worker, was executed, while his mother, Nino Laperashvili, a pianist, was exiled to Kazakhstan, to the Akmolinsk Camp for the Wives of Traitors to the Motherland (Alzhir) from which she returned eight years later. In the absence of his parents, Givi was raised by grandmother, Vera Ambriashvili. In 1947 he graduated from high school with a gold medal.

In 1952 Orjonikidze graduated Tbilisi State University, specializing in the history of Georgia under the supervision of academician Nikoloz Berdzenishvili. As the son of an "enemy of the people", he was not allowed to work in this field; therefore, a year later, he enrolled in the Tbilisi State Conservatory, specializing in musicology under the supervision of Vladimer Donadze. In 1959 he defended his PhD on the Georgian composer Andria Balanchivadze. Later, he audited lecture courses led by the eminent scholars Victor Abramovich Zuckerman and Lev Abramovich Mazel in Moscow.

From 1956 to 1968 he taught a course on the history of Western European and Soviet music at the Tbilisi State Conservatoire. In 1963 he became an associate professor. From 1968 to 1984 Orjonikidze served as a senior research fellow at the Institute of Philosophy of the Georgian National Academy of Sciences.

From 1974 to 1984 he was the Chairman of the Georgian Composers' Union and the Secretary of the USSR Composers' Union. He was also a deputy of the 9th and 10th convocations of the Supreme Soviet of the Georgian Soviet Socialist Republic and a member of the Legal Commission of the UNESCO International Music Council. In the last two decades of his life, he participated in numerous international conferences and symposia in the Soviet Union and various European countries (primarily Germany), as well as in Canada, Japan, and Australia. In May 1984, at the culmination of one of these trips to the Federal Republic of Germany, he fell seriously ill, and passed away upon returning to Moscow. Givi Orjonikidze is interred in Tbilisi, at the Didube Pantheon of public figures.

After Orjonikidze's death, his friend and well-known Georgian composer Giya Kancheli dedicated "Mourned by the Wind" to his memory. This liturgy has been performed by renowned musicians from around the world, including Yuri Bashmet, Kim Kashkashian and others.

== Creative work ==
Givi Orjonikidze is the author of over 250 works in Georgian, Russian, and German languages. His creative legacy includes monographs, contributions to scientific collections, articles in musical and publicistic journals, newspaper publications, introductory letters and annotations to scores and audio recordings, scripts for documentary films, as well as autobiographical stories. He was also the author of several radio and television programs about Georgian folk songs and Soviet music on Cologne Radio (Germany). Among his notable books is "Beitrage zur Musikkultur in der Sowjetunion und in der Bundesrepublik Deutschland" co-written together with prominent musicologist Carl Dahlhaus. He also co-wrote a book "Sozialistische Musikkultur" with another well-known German musicologist Jurgen Elsner.

Givi Orjonikidze's research was mainly focused on Andria Balanchivadze, Giya Kancheli, Sergei Prokofiev, Dimitri Shostakovich, Beethoven, Verdi, Wagner, and Richard Strauss. He viewed music not only in the context of culture, but also emphasized its connections with other spheres of artistic thought and with the society in which it is created and exists. Therefore, he studied not only the composers’ works, but also the problems of music function and perception, the sound environment of the modern city, and the means of mass communication. Despite prohibitions, he was well-versed in the 20th-century Western perspectives on these issues.

His scholarly interests encompassed nearly all areas of music culture – folklore and professional music, so-called “Estrada” (pop) music, performance, aesthetics, philosophy, sociology, and psychology of music. He was particularly attracted to theater, writing not only about music theater but also about drama theater and cinema.

During his work at the Georgian Institute of Philosophy (1967-1984), under the pretext of critical discussion, he produced scientific papers discussing the philosophical and aesthetic concepts of Wagner, Hanslick, Dahlhaus, Langer, Adorno, etc., focusing on categories of beauty, tragedy, and time in music. Additionally, he was the editor of several Russian-German scientific collections.

In the early 1950s, Orjonikidze was one of the first to engage in interdisciplinary research, becoming a pioneer of the most popular interdisciplinary methods in modern science within the Soviet Union. In 1957, the budding musicologist published his first essay on the psychology of music, “On Some Issues of Musical Image and Musical Thinking,” in the journal "Sabchota Khelovneba,” followed by one of his first Russian-language publications, “On the Specifics of Musical Thinking,” in the prestigious collection "Voprosi Muzikovedenia” in 1960, and the article “On Musical Perception” in the journal "Muzikalnaya Zhizn” in 1965. His last article, “Value in Music”, was published posthumously in 1988 in the major Russian music magazine “Sovetskaya Muzika”.

Writing in Russian was a necessity; under totalitarian conditions, it was the only way for a small country like Georgia, within the Soviet Union, to export its culture and science beyond its borders. This led Givi Orjonikidze to collaborate closely with Russian, music publishers and magazines from the very beginning. As renowned Russian musicologist Valentina Konen writes: “He managed to achieve not only equal standing with others but, in many instances, even surpassed most of his colleagues, both peers and non-peers”.

Givi Orjonikidze's proficiency is also noted by German musicologist Konrad Niemann, who undertook numerous joint projects with Givi Orjonikidze. He recalls their heated debates about Richard Strauss, who was reviled in East Germany and the Soviet Union for collaborating with Adolph Hitler. Orjonikidze was one of the few in the Soviet Union and globally to study the composer’s work. Orjonikidze even encouraged Tbilisi Opera House to stage the opera “Salome” in 1983. Particularly noteworthy is Niemann’s remark: “His command of the German language was remarkable. Raised on complex German philosophical texts, when translating articles into German, he sought to capture the subtlest nuances.”

Givi Orjonikidze’s life experiences made him a diplomat capable of speaking Aesop’s language and expressing ideologically unacceptable thoughts even under the conditions of a totalitarian regime. This boldness did not go unnoticed by Wolfgang Sandner, a German researcher of Giya Kancheli’s work in the 1990s, who wrote: “Even at that time, it was enough to slightly scrape official terminology to reveal the astonishingly rebellious words of G. Kancheli’s friend, musicologist Givi Orjonikidze. For 1982 and the context in which these words were spoken, such a statement was blasphemous”.

With his innovative scientific ideas and extensive research, Givi Orjonikidze enriched Georgian and Soviet musicology, marking a new stage in the development of this field, which would be associated with his name in subsequent years.

== Public activities ==
Givi Orjonikidze entered the scene during the heyday of Georgian culture and music when the so-called "1960s artists" (Bidzina Kvernadze, Sulkhan Nasidze, Nodar Gabunia, Giya Kancheli, Jansug Kakhidze, and later Ioseb Kechakmadze, Ioseb Bardanashvili, and others) emerged. At the same time, representatives of the older generation (Aleksi Machavariani, Andria Balanchivadze, Revaz Lagidze, Sulkhan Tsintsadze, and others) continued their work. It was a “battle of generations” with different artistic tendencies and aesthetic positions confronting one another. The new generation regarded Orjonikidze as their main “ideologist”, since he actively supported renewing Georgian music through his publications and public speeches.

Orjonikidze’s public activity took on special significance after his appointment as Chairman of the Georgian Composers’ Union (1974–1984). He participated in festivals, conferences, and colloquia in various countries, where he often defended national interests regardless of the topics addressed. He gave a German-language talk about Georgian folk songs and contemporary professional music on Cologne Radio and worked with the Columbia University library, which he helped enrich with Georgian gramophone records and sheet music. Of particular note are the national and international forums he organized in Tbilisi: “Transcaucasia Musical Spring” (1975); the All-Union Festival of Soviet Music (1981); and the Chamber Music Festival of Young Composers of Transcaucasia and the Baltic Republics (Moscow and Leningrad, 1982). He also invited foreign music publishers, philharmonic societies, and recording companies through the All-Union Agency on Copyright; many acted as impresarios, bringing Georgian composers and performers to the international stage. At his initiative, children’s international choirs were created in Akhaltsikhe, Tskhinvali, and Sokhumi. One of his last initiatives was inviting Ulrich Eckhardt, the director-general of Berliner Festspiele to Tbilisi. Eckhard’s travels and his familiarity with ancient and modern history, music, painting, cinema, and theater helped lay the foundation for the exhibition of Georgian culture held in West Berlin in the fall of 1988.

== Works dedicated to Orjonikidze's memory ==
- Giya Kancheli - "Mourned by the Wind"
- Giya Kancheli - "Letters to Friends"
- Sukhan Nasidze - string quartet N4
- Josef Bardanashvili - "Mtsukhris Lotsvani"
- Zinaida Khabalova - symphony N3

== Bibliography ==
Books in German:

- Beiträge zur Musikkultur in der Sowjetunion und in der Bundesrepublik Deutchland - co-written with Carl Dahlhaus
- Sozialistische Musikkultur - co-written with Jurgen Elsner

Books in Russian:

- „Отелло“ А. Мачавариани - 1958, Москва, „Государственное музыкальное издательство“
- „А. Баланчивадзе“ -1959, Москва, „Государственное музыкальное издательство“
- „Фортепианные сонаты Прокофьева“ — 1962, Москва, «Государственное музыкальное издательство“
- „Андрей Баланчивадзе“ – Очерк жизни и творчества. 1967, Тбилиси, „Литература да хеловнеба“
- „Оперы Верди на сюжеты Шекспира“ — 1967, Москва, „Музыка“

Books in Georgian:

- „აღმავლობის გზის პრობლემები“. (ქართული მუსიკის შესახებ 1974-77 წლებში შექმნილი მასალების კრებული) — 1978, თბილისი, „ხელოვნება“
- „თანამედროვე ქართული მუსიკა ესთეტიკისა და სოციოლოგიის შუქზე“ — 1985, თბილისი, „ხელოვნება“
