= International copyright treaties =

Treaties which provide protection for creative works

While no creative work is automatically protected worldwide, there are international treaties which provide protection automatically for all creative works as soon as they are fixed in a medium. Two of the most important international copyright treaties include the Berne Convention and the Universal Copyright Convention (UCC).

== Berne Convention ==
The Berne Convention for the Protection of Literary and Artistic Works (also referred to as just the Berne Convention) requires protection for all creative works in a fixed medium be automatic, and last for at least 50 years after the author's death for any work except for photographic and cinematographic works. Photographic works are tied to a minimum of 25 years. Cinematographic works are protected for 50 years after first showing, or 50 years after creation if it has not been shown within 50 years after the creation. The Berne Convention also allows for the rule of the shorter term, stating that "unless the legislation of that country otherwise provides, the term shall not exceed the term fixed in the country of origin of the work". Not all countries have applied this rule however.

== Buenos Aires Convention ==
The Buenos Aires Convention (Third Pan-American Convention) was a treaty signed by most North and South American countries, which allows for protection of all creative works as long as they contain a notice informing that the creator claims copyright on it. The Buenos Aires Convention also instituted the rule of the shorter term, where the length of the copyright term for the work in a country was whichever was shorter - the length of the term in the source country, or the protecting country of the work.

All Buenos Aires countries are now also parties to the Berne Convention, but elements from Buenos Aires are still used in the modern era, such as the rule of the shorter term.

== See also ==
- Category on Copyright treaties
- International Copyright Act of 1891
- Copyright
- Copyright law by country
- History of copyright law
- Intellectual property organization
- List of parties to international copyright treaties
- Philosophy of copyright
