= All-Union Agency on Copyright =

The All-Union Agency for Copyright or VAAP (Russian: Всесоюзное агентство по авторским правам, ВААП, romanized: Vsesoiuznoe agentstvo po avtorskim pravam) was a public organization for the protection of copyright in the USSR that existed from 1973 to 1991.

== History ==
The All-Union Copyright Agency was established by the Council of Ministers of the USSR on the basis of the All-Union Copyright Agency and the All-Union Copyright Agency of the Union of Artists of the USSR in 1973 in connection with the accession of the USSR to the Universal Copyright Convention (in the Geneva version of 1952), which followed on February 27, 1973 and was valid from May 27, 1973. Texts published in the USSR before 1973 were not subject to international copyright, and could be reproduced in other countries without the authors' permission or the payment of royalties.

Beginning in 1974, VAAP was a member of CISAC — the International Confederation of Societies of Authors and Composers. VAAP was one of the three founders and organizers of the Moscow Book Fair, which has been held every 2 years in September since 1977.

All licensing contracts with foreign publishers had to be concluded through VAAP; authors and Soviet publishers were forbidden to negotiate directly with foreign publishers.

The monopoly of the VAAP was abolished in 1989, during Perestroika.

== Criticism ==
VAAP was often seen as an attempt to control the flow of manuscripts reaching the West as tamizdat. By forbidding authors of negotiating directly with publishers, the government hoped to stop hostile publications abroad. The standard VAAP contract also gave them the right to control all paratext, including prefaces, notes and information in the dust jacket.

In an open letter dated October 1, 1973, Vladimir Voynovich ironically suggested giving VAAP a more appropriate name: VAPAP — the All-Union Agency for the Appropriation of Author's Rights (Russian: ВАПАП — Всесоюзное агентство по присвоению авторских прав). Voynovich's letter was published abroad in the magazine "Posev" (No. 11, 1973) and became the reason for examining the writer's personal case at a meeting of the Moscow Writers' Organization, as a result of which V. Voynovich was expelled from the Writers' Union.
