= Rule of the shorter term =

Provision of international copyright law

The rule of the shorter term, also called the comparison of terms, is a provision in international copyright treaties. The provision allows that signatory countries can limit the duration of copyright they grant to foreign works under national treatment to not more than the copyright term granted in the country of origin of the work.

== Fundamentals ==
International copyright treaties such as the Berne Convention (BC) or the Universal Copyright Convention (UCC) work through national treatment: signatory countries agree to grant copyright to foreign works under their local laws and by the same rules they grant copyright to domestic works. Whether a work is eligible to copyright, and if so, for how long that copyright exists, is governed by the laws of the country where copyright on the work is claimed. The Berne Convention and also the UCC define only the minimum requirements for copyrights that all signatory countries must meet, but any country is free to go beyond this minimal common denominator in its legislation. This is most noticeable in the duration for which copyrights are upheld. The Berne Convention lays down a minimal general copyright term of 50 years beyond the death of an author (50 years p.m.a.). But many countries have a longer term, such as 70 years p.m.a., or even 100 years p.m.a.

One and the same work may thus be copyrighted for different times in different countries (since, per lex loci protectionis, the copyright rules of each country apply within its jurisdiction, regardless of the work's country of origin). Its copyright may have expired already in countries with a minimum term, but at the same time, it may still be copyrighted in other countries that have longer copyright terms. National treatment may thus lead to an imbalance: works originating from countries with minimal copyright terms are copyrighted longer in other countries that have longer copyright terms. In that situation, works from a country that goes beyond the minimum requirements of a treaty may already have entered the public domain in foreign countries with shorter copyright term while still being copyrighted at home.

In such cases, the rule of the shorter term makes allowance for reciprocity in exception to the normal national treatment. Countries with a long copyright term may apply only the shorter foreign term to works from countries that have such a shorter term.

Hypothetical case where rule of shorter term applies
	Protection in Country A (70 years pma)	Protection in Country A (70 years pma, rule of shorter term)	Protection in Country B (50 years pma)
Works from Country A	70 years pma	70 years pma	50 years pma
Works from Country B	70 years pma	Country B's 50 years pma	50 years pma

== Universal Copyright Convention ==
In the Universal Copyright Convention, the comparison of terms is spelled out in article IV(4)(a), which reads:

No Contracting State shall be obliged to grant protection to a work for a period longer than that fixed for the class of works to which the work in question belongs, in the case of unpublished works by the law of the Contracting State of which the author is a national, and in the case of published works by the law of the Contracting State in which the work has been first published. — UCC, article IV(4)(a).

Addressing concerns of the Japanese delegation, the conference chair clarified that this subsumed the case of classes of works that were not copyrightable at all in their country of origin (as specified), as these would have a copyright term equal to zero. Thus other countries would not be obliged to grant copyright on such foreign works, even if similar domestic works were granted copyright.

The application of article IV(4)(a) is not mandatory: "not being obliged to" is not equivalent to "being obliged not to".

== Berne Convention ==
In the Berne Convention for the Protection of Literary and Artistic Works, a similar rule exists, but not for "classes of works" but considering individual works. Article 7(8) of the Berne Convention reads:

In any case, the term shall be governed by the legislation of the country where protection is claimed; however, unless the legislation of that country otherwise provides, the term shall not exceed the term fixed in the country of origin of the work. — Berne Convention, article 7(8).

Again, application of this rule is not mandatory. Any country may "provide otherwise" in its legislation. To do so, it is not necessary to include an explicit exception in the domestic copyright law, as the example of the United States shows.

The Berne Convention also states in article 5(2) that the enjoyment and exercise of copyright

... shall be independent of the existence of protection in the country of origin of the work. Consequently, apart from the provisions of this Convention, the extent of protection, as well as the means of redress afforded to the author to protect his rights, shall be governed exclusively by the laws of the country where protection is claimed. — Berne Convention, article 5(2).

This specifies national treatment, and also makes the existence of copyright on a work in one country independent from the existence of copyright on the work in other countries (lex loci protectionis).

A WIPO study in 2011 recommended that «The difficulty of the rule of the comparison of terms applicable to the duration for protection, as provided by Article 7(8) of the Berne Convention, should at least be assessed».

== Bilateral copyright treaties ==
The terms of existing or new bilateral treaties may moreover override these conventions, as long as such bilateral treaties meet the minimum requirements of the conventions. This is defined in article 20 of the Berne Convention and in articles XVIII and XIX of the UCC.

== Worldwide situation ==
Worldwide Status of the Rule of the Shorter Term
Countries and areas	Rule of the shorter term?
Afghanistan	No
Albania	Yes
Algeria	Yes
Andorra	No, unless public domain in the country of origin on the date the transitional provision entered into force
Angola	Yes
Antigua and Barbuda	Yes
Argentina	Yes
Armenia	No, unless public domain in the country of origin on the date article 45 entered into force
Australia	No, except for "Published Editions"
Bangladesh	Yes
Belarus	Yes, while party to Berne Convention
Berne Convention signatories	Yes, unless specified by signatory's legislation
Bhutan	Yes
Brazil	No
Canada	No. Before 2022, it was implemented for works of joint authorship with an exception for countries party to the Canada–United States–Mexico Agreement, i.e. U.S. and Mexico.
China (People's Republic, Mainland only)	No, unless public domain in the country of origin on the date of commencement of the Act
Colombia	No
Democratic Republic of the Congo	No
Dominican Republic	Yes
European Union members (to the extent that uniform)	Yes (with exceptions; only towards non-European Union members)
Guatemala	Yes
Guinea-Bissau	Yes
Honduras	Yes
Hong Kong	Yes
Iceland	No
India	Yes
Indonesia	No
Israel	Yes
Ivory Coast	No
Jamaica	No
Japan	Yes, unless the author is a Japanese national
Korea, Republic of (South)	Yes
Lebanon	No
Libya	Yes, since foreign works can only be protected if they are protected in their source country
Macau	Yes
Malaysia	No
Mexico	No
Mozambique	Yes
Nepal	No, also only protects works of WTO members
New Zealand	No, unless public domain in the country of origin on the date of commencement of the Act (15 Dec 1994)
Nigeria	No
Norway	Yes
Oman	No
Pakistan	Yes for countries designated in official schedule
Paraguay	No
Philippines	No, though "Reverse Reciprocity" of section 231 may apply
Russia	Yes
Saint Vincent and the Grenadines	No
Singapore	Yes
Suriname	Yes
Switzerland	No
Taiwan	Yes
Tanzania	Yes
Thailand	Yes
Timor-Leste	Yes
Turkey	No, unless public domain in the country of origin on the date the amendment to article 88 entered into force
United Kingdom	Yes, unless simultaneously published in the United Kingdom
United States	No, unless public domain in the "source country" on the "date of restoration"
Venezuela	No
Vietnam	No

== Situation in the United States ==
When the United States joined the Berne Convention, Congress explicitly declared that the treaty was not self-executing in the United States in the Berne Convention Implementation Act of 1988, section 2 (BCIA, Pub. L. 100–568). The BCIA made clear that within the U.S., only U.S. copyright law applied, and that U.S. copyright law, as amended by the BCIA, implemented the requirements of the Berne Convention (although it did not implement §18(1) of the Berne Convention, a deviation that was corrected by the Uruguay Round Agreements Act (URAA) in 1994).

This statement from public law 100-568 is repeated in the U.S. Copyright law in 17 USC 104, which assimilates foreign works to domestic works and which furthermore states in 17 USC 104(c) that

No right or interest in a work eligible for protection under this title may be claimed by virtue of, or in reliance upon; the provisions of the Berne Convention, or the adherence of the United States thereto. Any rights in a work eligible for protection under this title that derive from this title, other Federal or State statutes, or the common law, shall not be expanded or reduced by virtue of, or in reliance upon, the provisions of the Berne Convention, or the adherence of the United States thereto. – 17 USC 104(c)

Any requirements from the Berne Convention thus needed to be spelled out explicitly in the U.S. Copyright law to make them effective in the United States. But Title 17 of the United States Code does not contain any article on the rule of the shorter term. The only mention of such a rule was added in 1994 with the URAA in 17 USC 104A, which automatically restored copyrights on many foreign works, unless these works had already fallen in the public domain in their country of origin on the URAA date, which is January 1, 1996 for most foreign countries. Because there is no general rule of the shorter term in U.S. Copyright law, U.S. courts have declined to apply that rule on several occasions.

=== US case law ===
A notable pre-Berne American case involving the rule of the shorter term was Hasbro Bradley, Inc. v. Sparkle Toys, Inc. (780 F.2d 189 (2d Cir 1985)). Hasbro was distributing Japanese action figures in the U.S. under an exclusive license and claimed copyright on these toys. Sparkle Toys, which distributed exact copies of the toy figures, contested Hasbro's copyright claims. The court concluded that Hasbro was entitled to copyright despite the fact that the figures were not copyrighted at all in Japan and did not bear a copyright notice. William F. Patry has opined that the judge mistakenly concluded that the U.S. was required to grant copyright on these toys. Patry also concedes that under the Berne Convention, the U.S. would indeed be required to grant copyright to foreign works, even if such works were not copyrighted in their country of origin as per article 5(2) of the Berne Convention.

While the Hasbro case considered a special case of the applicability of rule of the shorter term in the context of the UCC, the case of Capitol Records, Inc. v. Naxos of America, Inc. (4 N.Y.3d 540, 2nd Cir. 2005) occurred after the Berne Convention. Capitol Records claimed copyright on old British sound recordings from the 1930s for which the copyright in the United Kingdom had expired in the late 1980s. Naxos Records, which distributed restored versions of the recordings, challenged the copyright claim. Sound recordings fall under special rules because before 2018, pre-1972 sound recordings in the U.S. were not covered by federal law but by state law. The court concluded that as federal law did not apply, and because neither the Berne Convention (which is inapplicable to sound recordings in any event) nor the Rome Convention usurped New York law, the works copyrighted pursuant to New York common law. The Uruguay Round Agreements Act and U.S. statutes did not, and had never, offered protection to these works, and the fact that they were not under copyright in the UK as of 1996 was completely irrelevant.

In Golan v. Holder, the Supreme Court wrote:

Title 17 U. S. C. §104A(h)(6)(B) defines a "restored work" to exclude "an original work of authorship" that is "in the public domain in its source country through expiration of [its] term of protection." This provision tracks Berne's denial of protection for any work that has "fallen into the public domain in the country of origin through the expiry of the term of protection." Art. 18(1), 828 U. N. T. S., at 251.

—

=== Bilateral treaties ===
Following the Chace International Copyright Act, which was signed into law on March 3, 1891 and became effective on July 1 of the same year, the United States concluded a number of bilateral copyright treaties with foreign countries. In 1891, treaties with Belgium, France, Switzerland, and the United Kingdom became effective; treaties followed in 1892 with Germany and Italy; in 1893 with Denmark and Portugal; in 1895 with Spain; in 1896 with Chile and Mexico; and in 1899 with Costa Rica and the Netherlands. These treaties remained effective even after the United States Copyright Act of 1976 unless "terminated, suspended, or revised by the President". The treaty from 1892 with Germany was applied in a court case in Germany in 2003.

== Situation in the European Union ==
In the European Union, copyrights have been harmonized amongst the member states by the EU directive 93/98/EEC on harmonising the term of copyright protection. This binding directive, which became effective on July 1, 1995, has raised the duration of copyrights throughout the union to 70 years p.m.a. It also includes in its article 7 a mandatory rule of the shorter term for works from non-EU countries. Within the EU, no comparison of terms is applied, and—as in the Berne Convention or in the UCC—existing international obligations (such as bilateral treaties) may override this rule of the shorter term. Directive 93/98/EEC was repealed and replaced by Directive 2006/116/EC of the European Parliament and of the Council of 12 December 2006 on the term of protection of copyright and certain related rights.

Germany extends the non-applicability of the rule of the shorter term to all members of the European Economic Area in §120 of its Urheberrechtsgesetz. It also does not apply the comparison of terms to U.S. works. In a case decided on October 7, 2003 by the Oberlandesgericht of Hesse in Frankfurt am Main, the court ruled that a U.S. work that had fallen in the public domain in the U.S. was still copyrighted in Germany. The court considered the rule of the shorter term inapplicable because of the bilateral copyright treaty between Germany and the United States, which had become effective on January 15, 1892 and which was still in effect. That treaty did not contain a rule of the shorter term, but just stated that works of either country were copyrighted in the other country by the other country's laws.

The EU member states implemented Directive 93/98/EEC and Directive 2006/116/EC in their national law; however, it is not guaranteed that such national implementations are either "comprehensive or in conformity" with the Directives.

=== EU case law ===
Even before article 7 of directive 93/98/EC explicitly prohibited the application of the rule of the shorter term amongst EU countries, the comparison of terms within the EU was not allowed. The Treaty instituting the European Community, which in its original version became effective in 1958, defined in article 7, paragraph 1, that within the union, any discrimination on grounds of nationality was prohibited. (Since 2002, when the treaty was amended by the Treaty of Maastricht, this is article 12, paragraph 1.) Application of the rule of the shorter term is such a discrimination, as it results in granting domestic authors longer copyright terms for their works than foreign authors from other EU countries.

This issue was settled decisively in 1993 (i.e., two years before directive 93/98/EC became effective) by the European Court of Justice (ECJ) in what became known as the Phil Collins decision. In that case, Phil Collins sued a German phonogram distributor who was marketing records of a concert Collins (a national of the United Kingdom, which was an EC member state at the time) had given in the U.S. German law of that time granted German performers full neighbouring rights, and in particular the right to prohibit the distribution of recordings made without their consent, regardless of the place the performance had occurred. At the same time, German law granted the same right to foreign performers only for their performances that had occurred in Germany. The ECJ decided on October 20, 1993 that this was a violation of the non-discrimination clause of article 7 of the EC treaty. It also clarified that the non-discrimination clause was indeed applicable to copyright.

The court stated that

In prohibiting "any discrimination on the grounds of nationality" Article 7 requires each Member State to ensure that persons in a situation governed by Community law be placed on a completely equal footing with its own nationals and therefore precludes a Member State from making the grant of an exclusive right subject to the requirement that the person concerned be a national of that State.

and clarified that this non-discrimination clause was not about differences between national laws, but to ensure that in any EU country, citizens and foreigners from other EU countries were treated equally:

Article 7 is not concerned with any disparities in treatment or the distortions which may result, for the persons and undertakings subject to the jurisdiction of the Community, from divergences existing between the laws of the various Member States, so long as those laws affect all persons subject to them, in accordance with objective criteria and without regard to their nationality.

In 2002, the ECJ then ruled in the Puccini case (or La Bohème case) that the non-discrimination clause was even applicable to nationals of EU member countries who had died before the EU came into existence, and it also explicitly reiterated that the comparison of terms was a violation of said non-discrimination rule. This case was about a performance of the opera La Bohème by Puccini by a state-owned theatre in Wiesbaden in the German state of Hesse in the seasons 1993/94 and 1994/95. Under the German laws of the time, the rule of the shorter term applied to foreign works and the opera was thus in the public domain in Germany since the end of 1980, when its 56-year Italian copyright term had run out. (Puccini had died on November 29, 1924.) Domestic works at the same time enjoyed a copyright term of 70 years after the authors death in Germany. A publisher of musical works claimed to hold the rights to Puccini's works in Germany, and took the state of Hesse to court, based on the non-discrimination clause, which he claimed prescribed a copyright term of 70 years in Germany also for foreign works. The Federal Court of Justice of Germany had doubts about whether the non-discrimination clause could be applied to authors deceased before the EU existed and referred the question to the ECJ, who fully confirmed the plaintiff's reading. The court flatly rejected the interpretation brought forth by the state of Hesse that the comparison of terms was based on the country of origin of a work, not on the nationality of an author, and thus was an objective criterion and not discrimination of the grounds of nationality. The court concluded that

The prohibition of discrimination ... precludes the term of protection granted by the legislation of a Member State to the works of an author who is a national of another Member State being shorter than the term granted to the works of its own nationals.
