= Universal Copyright Convention =

1952 international copyright treaty

Universal Copyright Convention (UCC) is an international instrument which was drawn up in 1952 under the auspices of UNESCO. The UCC was adopted in Geneva, Switzerland, in 1952, and enforced in 1955. It is one of the two principal international conventions protecting copyright; the other is the Berne Convention.

== History ==
The UCC was developed by UNESCO in 1952, adopted at Geneva, Switzerland, and came into force in 1955. It was developed as an alternative to the Berne Convention for those states that disagreed with aspects of the Berne Convention but still wished to participate in some form of multilateral copyright protection. These states included countries such as the United States and most of Latin America. The developing countries thought that the strong copyright protections granted by the Berne Convention overly benefited Western, developed, copyright-exporting nations; whereas the United States and Latin America were already members of the Buenos Aires Convention, a Pan-American copyright convention that was weaker than the Berne Convention. The Berne Convention states also became party to the UCC, so that their copyrights would exist in non-Berne convention states. In 1973 the Soviet Union joined the UCC.

The United States only provided copyright protection for a fixed renewable term, and required that, for a work to be copyrighted, it must contain a copyright notice and be registered at the Copyright Office. The Berne Convention, on the other hand, provided for copyright protection for a single term based on the life of the author, and did not require registration or the inclusion of a copyright notice for copyright to exist. Thus the United States would have to make several major modifications to its copyright law to become a party to the Berne Convention. At the time, the United States was unwilling to do so. The UCC thus permits those states that had a system of protection similar to the United States for fixed terms at the time of signature to retain them. Eventually, the United States became willing to participate in the Berne Convention and change its national copyright law as required. In 1989 it became a party to the Berne Convention as a result of the Berne Convention Implementation Act of 1988.

Under the Second Protocol of the Universal Copyright Convention (Paris text), protection under U.S. copyright law is expressly required for works published by the United Nations, by UN specialized agencies and by the Organization of American States (OAS). The same requirement applies to other contracting states as well.

Berne Convention states were concerned that the existence of the UCC would encourage parties to the Berne Convention to leave that convention and adopt the UCC instead. So the UCC included a clause stating that parties which were also Berne Convention parties need not apply the provisions of the convention to any former Berne Convention state that renounced the Berne Convention after 1951. Thus, any state that has once adopted the Berne Convention is penalised if it then decides to renounce the Berne Convention and use the UCC protections instead, as its copyrights might no longer exist in Berne Convention states.

Since almost all countries are either members or aspiring members of the World Trade Organization (WTO), and thus comply with the Agreement on Trade-Related Aspects of Intellectual Property Rights Agreement (TRIPS), the UCC has lost significance.

== See also ==
- International copyright
- List of parties to the Universal Copyright Convention
