= Fair use (Poland) =

Concept in Polish copyright law

Fair use (Polish: dozwolony użytek) is a concept in Polish copyright law that allows the use of copyrighted works without the author's economic rights or rights holder's permission and, in principle, without remuneration. This limitation restricts the exclusive rights of the copyright holder to use the work and to derive benefits from its use. The restriction of these exclusive rights is justified either by private interests (private fair use) or public interests (public fair use).

The term "fair use" is specific to the Polish Copyright Act of 1994. It does not appear in the legislation or legal scholarship of other countries and was not present in Poland's previous copyright laws of 1926 and 1952. Fair use serves as the Polish equivalent of limitations and exceptions to copyright.

Certain rules apply to all forms of fair use. The work must have been previously made publicly available. Additionally, moral rights must be respected – whenever possible, the author and source should be credited. Furthermore, the user's activities must not be in competition with those of the copyright holder.

== Essence ==
The copyright holder has the exclusive right to use, dispose of, and receive remuneration for the use of a work. In certain cases, this monopoly may be limited by statutory provisions. Some legal experts argue that this is not limited to the copyright and related rights act but also includes, among others, the civil code and treaties.

One such institution is fair use, regulated in Chapter III, Section 3 of the Copyright Act. Its purpose is to allow users free (to a certain extent) access to creative works, enabling the use of works without the need for explicit permission from the copyright holder and, as a rule, without payment of remuneration.

The justification for fair use is both practical (personal interests of users in the case of private fair use) and purposive (public interest in the case of public fair use). Fair use (exceptions and limitations to copyright in general) is considered a "classic institution of copyright law".

== Fair use among copyright exceptions and limitations ==
The term "fair use" does not originate from legal writing. It was introduced as the title of a group of provisions in the Polish Copyright and Related Rights Act of 1994. Previously, in the acts of 1926 and 1952, such a term did not exist. Some have expressed the view that "fair use" is a functional rather than a strictly legal concept. Thus, it encompasses provisions that are connected not by their nature but by their intended purpose.

Since fair use is such a specific concept, discussions about the relationship between "fair use" and "copyright limitations" are not pursued. The distinction between terms such as "fair use" and "statutory licenses" also remains unclear. Scholars who propose a clear classification of broadly understood copyright limitations agree that it cannot be directly applied to existing regulations. While standardizing terminology would not affect the application of the provisions, it would be convenient.

== History ==
Provisions on fair use were included in the copyright acts of 1926 and 1952. In the former, they were outlined in Articles from 13 to 17, within Chapter II, titled Limitations on Copyright. These provisions allowed, among other things, private use, reprinting, and the broadcasting of works on the radio. In the 1952 act, fair use provisions were found in Articles from 18 to 22, within Chapter III, titled Content of Copyright. The amendments made to this act were flawed – internally inconsistent and not adapted to technological developments. It was during the enforcement of the 1952 act that mass copying onto magnetic tapes emerged, leading to proposals for the introduction of private copying levys.

The fair use provisions of the 1994 Copyright Act have been amended multiple times. In 2004 and 2015, changes were introduced to align Polish law with European Union regulations (Directive 2001/29/EC). For private fair use, a requirement was added that only "single copies" of works could be used. Additionally, several new provisions regarding public fair use were introduced.

== Principles of fair use ==
=== General concept ===
Fair use applies only to certain ways of using specific groups of works. These uses are difficult to systematize or generalize. It is widely accepted that there are no universal criteria for fair use, and formulating them appears impossible. However, some legal scholars disagree. Although the provisions vary in terms of permitted use, they share a common regulatory approach. Based on this, eight legal principles have been proposed to aid in interpreting the provisions:

- Principle of a closed list of fair use forms
- Principle of using a published work
- Principle of universality – fair use must be accessible to all (e.g., private fair use) or to everyone within a defined group (e.g., library fair use)
- Principle of loyalty – fair use must not interfere with the normal exploitation of a work (the Berne three-step test)
- Principle of respecting moral rights
- Principle of use without remuneration
- Principles of either limiting freedom or limiting the scope of copyright enforcement, depending on the adopted concept
- Principle of the user's subjective right – a proposal from one scholar

Since no general concept of fair use exists, some propose aligning Polish regulations with the American fair use doctrine. However, adopting a foreign legal concept would slow down court proceedings. A potential solution could be drawing from Canada's experience, where fair dealing has been adapted to resemble the American fair use.

=== Closed set of exceptional cases ===
The Polish Copyright Act, like the laws of other droit d'auteur systems and European Union law, employs a case-specific approach to regulating copyright exceptions and limitations. Experts conclude that, since the principle is the exclusivity of the author's rights, fair use is an exception to this rule. Therefore, the legal maxim exceptiones non sunt extendae applies, meaning that exceptions should be interpreted strictly, without drawing analogies between different forms of fair use. Some legal scholars, however, allow for analogy, provided that the legitimate interests of creators and the function of a given provision are taken into account. They argue that the prohibition of analogy "lacks normative grounds and is not justified on axiological grounds".

=== Use of published works ===
Fair use does not infringe upon moral rights, including the author's right to decide on the first public release of a work (the right of dissemination). In other words, fair use applies only to published works. This rule has traditionally been upheld in droit d'auteur systems. During the enforcement of the 1926 Polish Copyright Act, legal scholars were uncertain whether this rule applied, as it was not explicitly stated in the legislation. The 1994 Act introduced various fair use provisions requiring prior dissemination, publication, or public display of a work. However, amendments in 2004 and 2015 reduced the number of fair use provisions that required prior publication (i.e., the availability of physical copies such as books or CDs).

There is uncertainty regarding the use of works received directly from the author that have not been previously published. It could be argued that such works fall under fair use only for the recipient but not for others. Another question arises as to whether, by privately sharing a work, the author implicitly grants the recipient the right to decide on its first public release. A further issue concerns cases where a user is unaware that a work has not been published with the author's consent – particularly regarding quotation rights and reprinting. A strict interpretation would deem such use illegal, even if the user cannot determine whether the work has been disseminated. However, some argue that such use could be legal if the user is not at fault (i.e., they have no reasonable way of verifying the work's publication status).

=== Non-interference with normal use ===
The Berne three-step test is included in copyright law acts and regulates the creation and interpretation of provisions related to exceptions and limitations (fair use). In 1994, it was included in Article 35 of the Polish Copyright Act. The wording "fair use must not interfere with" (normal use of a work or harm the legitimate interests of the creator) means that Article 35 limits the scope of fair use provisions. A copyright holder can invoke it if a user infringes on copyright, even if this does not arise directly from the provision regulating that particular form of fair use.

Although this regulation has been part of Polish copyright law for many years, it still raises doubts and presents interpretive challenges due to the lack of legal definitions and the vagueness of the terms used. Legal scholars' views on the subject are not uniform, leading to different conclusions. Courts also do not provide a clear answer.

=== Respect for moral rights ===
Limitations and exceptions to copyright only concern economic rights, not moral rights. Legal experts agree on this, although it is not explicitly stated in the provisions. In the 1926 Act, this could be inferred from the public fair use provision, which required the attribution of the creator and source of the work and prohibited altering the work. It was unclear whether this rule applied to private use as well. In the 1994 Act, the requirement to mention the creator and the source of the work is stipulated in Article 34. The principle of respecting moral rights is so firmly established that it has been argued that explicitly stating the obligation to mention the author and source in the law is "somewhat redundant".

Article 34 applies to all forms of fair use. This assessment is not changed by the difficulty of ensuring the creator and source are mentioned in private use cases.

Attributing the creator means providing their full name or pseudonym. If the work is published anonymously, revealing the creator's identity might infringe upon their moral rights. For collaborative works, such as films, it is unnecessary to list all co-creators. The term "source" can refer to different information. In the case of a citation, it refers to the title of the work, but it may also refer to the location of the work (e.g., the name and issue number of a journal, or a website address). Citing the source may involve providing the name of the editor of a collective work or the publisher's name. These examples are not exhaustive, and it is not necessary to provide all of them simultaneously.

In practice, attributing the author and source can vary depending on the available information. In some cases, full knowledge of authorship or source may not be accessible, while in others, it may not be possible to convey such information when using the work (e.g., citing during a concert). The way the author and source are provided also depends on customary practices.

=== No payment for fair use ===
As a general rule, users are not required to pay the copyright holder for using works under fair use provisions. This principle is established in Article 34 of the Copyright Act. Exceptions are designed to balance the protection of both user and copyright holder interests. One way of balancing these interests is the implementation of private copying levys. These levys serve as compensation to copyright holders for mass private fair use. Some provisions of public fair use allow copyright holders to receive remuneration. These include the right of reproduction, permission for using works in creating textbooks, excerpts, and anthologies, as well as encyclopedias and atlases, and library fair use provisions.

The issue of no payment is tied to the user's financial gain. Certain provisions require that the use be non-commercial. Some legal experts interpret this to mean that, in such cases, the user not only does not pay the copyright holder but also cannot use the work for commercial purposes (to gain financial benefit). Some specialists argue that this principle applies to all forms of fair use.

Others assert that this conclusion is incorrect, as the requirement for no payment is specified only in some provisions. Furthermore, it is pointed out that certain forms of fair use typically involve gaining benefits (e.g., creating an anthology). Therefore, it is concluded that earning a profit is legal as long as the relevant provision does not prohibit it and as long as the three-step test is not violated. Courts also permit legal situations where the user gains profit, provided the profit is not the sole purpose of using the work.

=== Limitation of content or exercise of copyright ===
A limitation (or boundary) of the content of copyright refers to what lies outside the scope of the copyright holder's rights. On the other hand, a limitation on the freedom to exercise copyright is what the author cannot effectively enforce (in court). During the period of the 1926 Act, there was an interpretation suggesting that private fair use was considered a limitation of the content of copyright, while public fair use was a limitation on the exercise of copyright. In the period of the 1952 Act, various opinions were presented on this matter. Some legal experts believe that under the 1994 Act, fair use is a limitation on the exercise of copyright, while others strongly advocate for the alternative view.

=== Entitlement to fair use ===
A proposal has been made to grant an entitlement to fair use, or even more broadly, an entitlement for users to the copyrights. Currently, users do not have such a right and cannot demand permission to use a work.

Practical advantages of granting users an entitlement would include, for instance, enabling them to present a positive claim of fair use (shifting the burden of proof to those who assert legal consequences due to the absence of fair use). Fair use would be assessed in light of Article 5 of the Civil Code. This would resolve uncertainties related to circumstances such as removing technical protection measures that prevent copying works and the effectiveness of contractual modifications to fair use.

However, the disadvantages of this solution are substantial. It would marginalize the author and other rights holders. It would also be difficult to define the scope of such a right. Users granted an entitlement would have greater potential to weaken their own rights (simply making the entitlement inalienable would not suffice). Furthermore, there is the issue of contractual modification of the scope of fair use, which could reduce rights deliberately granted by the legislator. Granting an entitlement to fair use would increase transactional costs, particularly those related to users seeking protection.

== Classification ==
The basic division of fair use provisions is based on the addressees and the types of interests being satisfied. This is the division into private and public fair use. Private fair use allows individuals to use works in the private sphere. In addition to the user, people close to them may also use the work. The manner of use is generally at the user's discretion. Before the mass copying of works for private use began, it was assumed that copyright protection did not naturally apply to users' private sphere. On the other hand, public fair use allows specific entities to use others' works for the cultural and educational needs of society. The scope of public fair use provisions is based on current social needs, including usage for informational and educational purposes.

Another criterion is the possibility of obtaining compensation for fair use by the copyright holder. Yet another is the manner of use: some provisions relate only to traditional use, while others apply to both traditional and digital use.

=== Public fair use ===
The first Polish copyright law was the Act of 1926, organizing public fair use by creative fields to meet informational, scientific, educational, and cultural needs while respecting authors' rights. The 1952 Act retained this structure (Articles 18–21) but faced criticism for interpretive difficulties, lack of uniformity, and loopholes. The 1994 Act replaced it with a purpose-based system distinguishing informational, educational, scientific, and cultural uses. Amendments in 2004 aligned with EU law (Directive 2001/29/EC), introducing digital reproduction and accessibility provisions, while 2015 changes further refined regulations, including remuneration for library loans.

==== Use of works broadcast via radio and television ====
Article 232 of the Act on Copyright and Related Rights limits an author's exclusive right to reproduce copies of a work, aligning with Article 5(2)(d) of Directive 2001/29/EC and Article 11 bis(3) of the Paris version of the Berne Convention. It allows radio and television broadcasters to fix and use works for a short time, legalizing the common practice of broadcasting pre-recorded content. This applies only to wireless broadcasters, excluding cable broadcasters, and requires the destruction of fixations, though the timing of destruction is unspecified. Before 2015, fixations of programs with exceptional documentary value could be archived, but the amendment clarified that only fixations entering national archives are exempt from destruction.

Article 24(1) of the Act on Copyright and Related Rights limits an author's right to publicly distribute a work, facilitating access to radio and television broadcasts, supporting commercial cable networks, reducing infrastructure costs, and improving urban aesthetics by minimizing antennas. This fair use also relates to the private sphere of users. Recipients must form a closed group, restricting applicability. While the provision mentions "another radio or television organization", re-broadcasting is not limited to such entities; anyone can re-broadcast under its terms. Re-broadcasting must be simultaneous and unaltered, distinct from fragmented or pre-recorded broadcasts, or programs offering user choice. If users incur costs or fees are charged, re-broadcasting is considered paid, though defining permissible actions remains complex. Some legal experts view this provision as reaffirming a copyright holder’s right to share in user benefits.

Article 24(2) of the Act on Copyright and Related Rights regulates "receptive" fair use, distinguishing it from "broadcasting" use. It covers users who receive radio or television broadcasts, but prohibits financial gains, whether direct or indirect. In business settings, consumer influence matters, as seen in shopping malls playing music, which likely extends to transport and hospitality services.

==== Use for informational purposes ====
Based on Article 25 of the Copyright and Related Rights Act, the press, radio, and television can use specific categories of others' works related to topics of current public interest. Unlike other forms of fair use, creators can prohibit the use of certain categories of works and have the right to receive remuneration for their use.

Article 26 of the Copyright and Related Rights Act introduces an exception allowing individuals preparing reports on events to quote works made available at those events. This regulation is based on Article 10bis(2) of the Berne Convention and Article 5(3)(c) of Directive 2001/29/EC. The provision can be invoked by anyone preparing a report on a current event, provided the report serves an informational purpose and is published immediately. While the provision appears broad, it mainly applies when works serve as background to the event, as interpreted in the Berne Convention. The ability to quote works aims to prevent the removal of elements of reality.

As part of the 2015 amendment, Article 25(1)(4) of the Copyright and Related Rights Act was repealed, and Article 26^{1}was added to align Polish regulations with Article 5(3)(f) of Directive 2001/29/EC. This provision can now be invoked by anyone, not just the press, radio, and television. It permits the use of certain types of publicly delivered speeches, including political speeches, those made at public hearings, and excerpts from public addresses, lectures, and sermons. A speech is considered public when the audience is an open group, and it is not deemed delivered if recorded for public reproduction. The use of such speeches is permitted within limits justified by the purpose of information, including live broadcasts and publishing summaries. However, any dissemination of collections of such works is excluded.

==== Use for educational and scientific purposes ====
Article 27 of the Copyright and Related Rights Act allows institutions engaged in educational or scientific activities to use works to a certain extent. This facilitates the dissemination of knowledge and scientific development. Educational institutions, universities, and scientific entities may invoke this provision, while non-governmental organizations that do not operate such institutions cannot.

Article 27¹ of the Copyright and Related Rights Act aims to facilitate access to small creative educational materials used for teaching or scientific research. Before 2015, this form of fair use was regulated under Article 29(2–3), and it is not considered a special form of the right of quotation, which is why it was moved to Article 27¹. The law does not define textbooks, extracts, or anthologies, but legal experts generally view the purpose of a work as the decisive factor in classifying it, rather than its title. The regulation uses the term "chrestomathy" from the Brussels revision of the Berne Convention, equating extracts with educational and scientific anthologies. Educational materials created for personal learning or hobbies are excluded from this provision. Textbooks, extracts, and anthologies may include published minor works or excerpts from larger works, and the size of the included work depends on the purpose of use. The citation of creative databases is excluded under Article 30¹, and some legal experts argue that omitting this exclusion could violate the Berne three-step test. Authors are entitled to compensation for the inclusion of their work in these materials.

Under Article 28 of the Copyright and Related Rights Act, certain institutions may, without the consent of copyright holders, provide non-commercial access to works (loan copies of works) as part of their statutory activities. As part of the 2015 amendment, a right to remuneration for copyright holders was introduced for public lending. This remuneration applies only to printed copies of literary works expressed in Polish, loaned externally by public libraries, with the exception of the National Library of Poland.

==== Right to quote and similar concepts ====
Article 29 of the Copyright and Related Rights Act permits the inclusion of "excerpts" from other works within one's own, including entire visual, photographic, and "minor" works. An "excerpt" refers to a small portion of a work, smaller than a fragment, and must be placed within a work that remains independent without the quotations. Quotation is allowed when justified by the citation's function. The 2015 amendment removed the exhaustive list of permissible citation purposes.

Until the 2015 amendment, the fair use of works for parody, pastiche, and caricature was derived from the fair use of quotations within the artistic genre's limits. Parodies humorously reference existing works, while pastiches reference a style without being humorous, and caricatures exaggerate features of the subject. The 2015 amendment introduced Article 29¹ of the Copyright and Related Rights Act, aligning with Directive 2001/29/EC. The Court of Justice of the European Union ruled that parodies must be distinguishable and cannot replace the original work, and must not discriminate based on race or ethnicity. Pastiche and caricature, which do not rely on quoting but on modifying works, were previously flawed under the "right to quote" framework. Since 2015, the scope of these genres has become more clearly defined, especially for parody.

Article 292 of the Copyright and Related Rights Act aligns with Article 5(3)(i) of Directive 2001/29/EC and is related to the right to quote under Article 29. It allows for the intentional inclusion of a work, similar to "informational quotation" (Article 26), without requiring the user to remove elements of the work. This applies when the included work serves as background for the main elements of the new work, meaning the external work can be replaced without affecting the use of the incorporated work.

==== Temporary digital reproduction of works ====
Article 23^{1}of the Copyright and Related Rights Act, based on Article 5(1) of Directive 2001/29/EC, regulates the creation of temporary copies of digital works. Revised in 2015, it clarifies that such copies, necessary for accessing digital works, may infringe copyright. The regulation sets three key conditions for permissibility:

- Temporary, incidental, or necessary reproduction within a technological process.
- Reproduction without independent economic significance.
- Reproduction for lawful transmission or use.

These conditions have been interpreted by the European Court of Justice, especially in relation to temporary or incidental reproduction, such as caching on servers. The 2015 revision improved implementation by adjusting terminology, making the provision more flexible for IT services. The conditions ensure that temporary copies are not used for independent economic gain and do not replace the use of the final work.

==== Religious ceremonies, official events, and academic functions ====
Article 31 of the Copyright and Related Rights Act permits the use of copyrighted works during certain public events. It distinguishes between two forms of fair use:

- §1 aligns with Article 5(3)(g) of Directive 2001/29/EC, allowing the use of works at religious ceremonies and official public authority events without financial gain. It also permits various forms of use (e.g., public performance, reproduction, and public display).
- §2 allows the use of publicly disseminated works at school and academic events, including live performances and prior recordings, as long as there is no financial gain or remuneration for performers.

Both sections emphasize non-commercial use. §3 excludes uses tied to commercial purposes or political affiliation. Some argue this provision is unnecessary, as the list of allowed events is now non-exhaustive.

==== Public exhibition of a copy of a visual work ====
Article 32 of the Copyright and Related Rights Act addresses the use of copies of visual works. It contains two provisions:

- §1 allows the owner of a copy of a visual work to publicly disseminate it, including photographic works and industrial designs (proposed for extension). This provision is an exception to the rule in Article 50(3) and aligns with the principle of exhaustion of rights. It prohibits financial gain but permits fees for covering operational costs.
- §2 governs the exercise of ownership rights over a copy of a work, mainly protecting the personal interests of the creator and is not considered fair use.

The financial gain restriction in §1 is debated, with some experts arguing it applies only to the owner, while others believe it extends to indirect profits.

==== Dissemination of works available in certain public places ====
Article 33(1) of the Copyright and Related Rights Act allows for the dissemination of works permanently displayed in publicly accessible roads, streets, squares, or gardens. Freedom of panorama in Poland does not extend to works located indoors or on private property that is not open to the public. The perspective from which an image is captured is irrelevant – an aerial view is just as permissible as a ground-level perspective.

==== Dissemination of works in encyclopedias and atlases ====
Article 33(3) of the Copyright and Related Rights Act permits, under certain conditions, the dissemination of visual and photographic works in encyclopedias and atlases without the author's consent. The term "atlas" is interpreted broadly. This use is only allowed when the user encounters "difficult-to-overcome obstacles". This can mean either an inability to establish any contact with the author or a failure to reach an agreement. The first interpretation links this regulation to orphan works and the concept of "diligent searches". Some experts, however, advocate for the second interpretation.

==== Use for the benefit of persons with disabilities ====
Article 33^{1}of the Copyright and Related Rights Act aligns with Article 5(3)(b) of Directive 2001/29/EC and the Marrakesh Treaty of WIPO (2013). It aims to reduce social exclusion and enhance access to knowledge and culture for people with disabilities. The provision does not specify which works are covered but excludes computer programs based on Article 77.

The provision is meant for use by entities acting on behalf of persons with disabilities (not necessarily the disabled individuals themselves). It overlaps with private fair use regulations, and a disability certificate is not required. The two main conditions are that the use must depend on the type of disability, and the number and size of the works should enable access to them. There are concerns about the ambiguity of these conditions, particularly regarding non-profit organizations. However, charging fees to cover expenses is allowed.

==== Use for public safety purposes and in administrative, judicial, or legislative proceedings ====
Article 33^{2} aligns with Article 5(3)(e) of Directive 2001/29/EC and allows the use of works for public safety and legal proceedings. It applies to all works except computer programs and does not require distribution, preventing moral rights violations. The provision can be invoked by entities ensuring public safety or involved in legal proceedings. It does not cover preparatory proceedings, and works can be used as evidence or in reports, but case materials cannot be disclosed to unauthorized persons.

==== Use for advertising publicly accessible exhibitions or public sale of works ====
Article 33^{3}implements Article 5(3)(j) of Directive 2001/29/EC and allows the use of works for advertising publicly accessible exhibitions or the public sale of copies, excluding computer programs. Before the 2015 amendment, this provision partially overlapped with Article 33(2), which was repealed and consolidated. The use of works for advertising exhibitions or online sales was previously unclear. The current regulation allows promoting the sale of copies or copyrights but excludes other commercial uses. It limits use to promoting the exhibition or sale itself, not related events or entities.

==== Use in connection with the presentation or repair of equipment ====
Article 33^{4} corresponds to Article 5(3)(l) of Directive 2001/29/EC and applies to all works, except computer programs. It permits the use of works for presenting or repairing equipment used for accessing them, including technical works like manuals and designs. Some view this provision as overly protective of copyright holders. The use of works in this context is seen as a means to demonstrate equipment functionality rather than an end itself. The provision clarifies issues related to equipment presentation or repair but doesn't address playing music in stores.

==== Use for the reconstruction or renovation of a building ====
Article 33^{5} corresponds to Article 5(3)(m) of Directive 2001/29/EC, regulating the use of works for construction purposes. However, the directive's provision was not fully implemented. The term "building structure" in the act, defined by Construction Law, is broader than the "architectural work" mentioned in the directive. This leads to inconsistencies, as the act allows the use of works for both reconstruction and renovation, while the directive only permits reconstruction. These differences may cause contradictions in application, with the directive's provisions taking precedence in such cases.

== See also ==
- Private fair use (Poland)
- Fair use

== Bibliography ==
- Barta, J.; Markiewicz, R. (2016). Prawo autorskie [Copyright Law] (in Polish). Warsaw: Wolters Kluwer. ISBN 978-83-264-9694-3.
- Gienas, K. (2016). "Dozwolony użytek chronionych utworów" [Fair Use of Protected Works]. In Drzewiecki, A. (ed.). Ustawa o prawie autorskim i prawach pokrewnych: komentarz [The Copyright and Related Rights Act: Commentary] (in Polish). Warsaw: C. H. Beck. ISBN 978-83-255-8504-4.
- Golat, R. (2002). Komentarz do ustawy o prawie autorskim i prawach pokrewnych [Commentary on the Copyright and Related Rights Act] (in Polish). Warsaw: Tur. ISBN 83-86212-70-5.
- Klafkowska-Waśniowska, K. (2008). Prawa do nadań programów radiowych i telewizyjnych w prawie autorskim [Rights to Broadcasts of Radio and Television Programs in Copyright Law] (in Polish). Warsaw: Wolters Kluwer. ISBN 978-83-264-2886-9.
- Machała, W. (2003). Dozwolony użytek prywatny w polskim prawie autorskim [Private Fair Use in Polish Copyright Law] (in Polish). Warsaw: Liber. ISBN 83-7206-097-5.
- Małek, L. (2011). Cytat w świetle prawa autorskiego [Quotation in the Light of Copyright Law] (in Polish). Warsaw: Wolters Kluwer. ISBN 978-83-264-1276-9.
- Marcinkowska, J. (2004). "Dozwolony użytek w prawie autorskim" [Fair Use in Copyright Law]. Prace Instytutu Prawa Własności Intelektualnej UJ (in Polish). Kraków: Zakamycze. ISSN 0137-236X.
- Preussner-Zamorska, J.; Marcinkowska, J.; Laskowska, E. (2017). "Dozwolony użytek chronionych utworów" [Fair Use of Protected Works]. In Barta, J. (ed.). Prawo autorskie [Copyright Law] (in Polish). Warsaw: C.H. Beck. ISBN 978-83-255-8754-3.
- Szczotka, J. (2007). "Autorskie prawa majątkowe" [Economic Copyright Rights]. In Poźniak-Niedzielska, M.; Szczotka, J.; Mozgawa, M. (eds.). Prawo autorskie i prawa pokrewne: zarys wykładu [Copyright and Related Rights: An Outline of the Lecture] (in Polish). Bydgoszcz: Branta. ISBN 978-83-60186-34-3.
- Szczotka, J. (2013). Najem i użyczenie egzemplarzy utworu jako odrębne pola eksploatacji [Rental and Lending of Copies of a Work as Separate Fields of Exploitation] (in Polish). Warsaw: Wolters Kluwer Polska. ISBN 978-83-264-4142-4.
- Traple, E. (2011). "Dozwolony użytek chronionych utworów" [Fair Use of Protected Works]. In Czajkowska-Dąbrowska, M. (ed.). Prawo autorskie i prawa pokrewne [Copyright and Related Rights] (in Polish) (5th ed.). Warsaw: Wolters Kluwer. ISBN 978-83-264-1493-0.
