= Private fair use (Poland) =

Concept in Polish copyright law

Private fair use in Polish law refers to a statutory authorization that allows users to privately utilize copyrighted works without obtaining permission from copyright holders or paying them. It is a form of fair use and serves as one of the limitations (or exceptions) regulated by international and EU law.

Copyright protection primarily concerns the public use of a work and does not interfere with the private sphere. To adapt the law to the private use of works by individual users, legislators have introduced provisions similar to private fair use. It is a fundamental institution of copyright law with significant social importance. Similar provisions were included in the 1926 and 1952 acts and are also present in the laws of all European countries. In the Polish Copyright Act of 1994, private fair use is regulated in Article 23. Although this institution has deep-rooted traditions and its essence remains constant, its scope is subject to change.

Since fair use is an exception to the principle of monopoly, its scope is strictly defined. However, it is also broad. Users may utilize nearly all categories of works in any manner – they can save, copy, and distribute them. It does not matter whether the copy of the work they use was created legally. Users are free to use the entire work, not just parts of it, for any purpose, provided they respect the author's moral rights, use the work personally or within a circle of people with whom they have personal ties, and do not use it in a way that competes with the copyright holder. Exceptionally, private fair use does not apply to the use of creative databases and computer programs, nor to constructing buildings based on architectural or urban-architectural works.

== History ==
The first Polish copyright law was the Act of 1926. Its Article 17 allowed copying and other reproductions "exclusively for personal use". Private fair use was excluded with regard to building according to someone else's architectural work. Apart from that, private fair use encompassed all categories of works. The requirement to credit the creator and the prohibition of modifying the work were in place. There were no limitations on the extent of allowed use. At that time, it was considered that private fair use did not belong to the sphere of the author's exclusive rights. However, this was not an external exception or limitation, but rather a consequence of the limited nature of copyright itself.

In the subsequent Act of 1952, private fair use was regulated in Article 22. A similar exclusion applied to building according to someone else's architectural work. Although the provision only mentioned copying and other reproductions, the user could also distribute the work by making it available to people with whom they had social ties. It was assumed that the user could not derive financial benefits from such distribution.

During the period of the 1952 Act, technological advancements occurred. The phenomenon of mass copying to magnetic tapes emerged. It was noted that such copying had an impact on the income of creators. According to the German Federal Court of Justice, private copying of works required the consent of the copyright holder. Although this line of thinking was accepted, it was acknowledged that making copies contingent on obtaining consent each time was impossible. It was then proposed to introduce private copying levys.

== Premises ==
=== Users ===
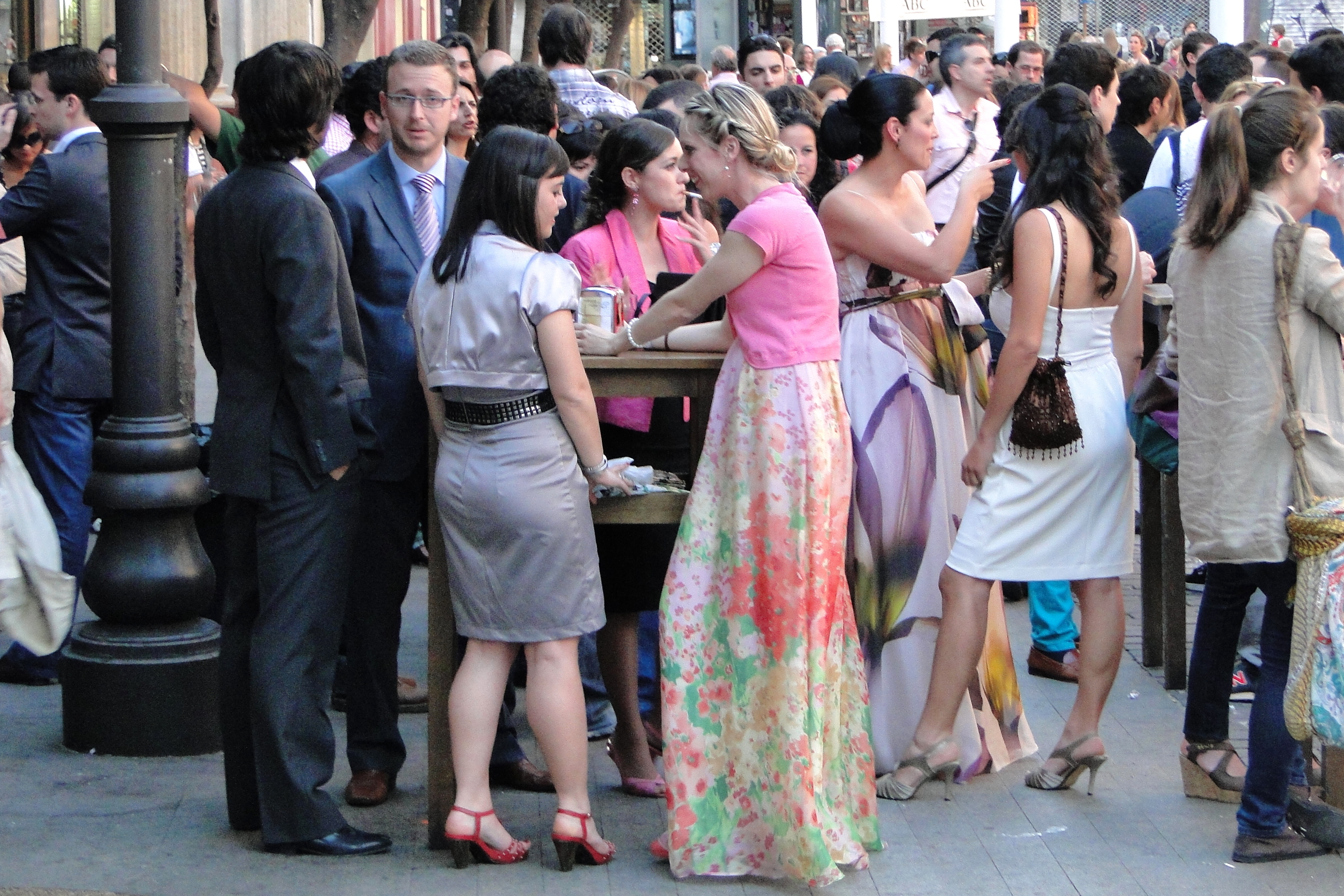
In the case of events such as weddings, it is difficult to determine whether the use falls within the limits of private fair use

Private fair use applies to natural persons, regardless of their legal competence. It does not apply to juridical persons or unincorporated entities. This is because only natural persons create personal relationships. The Supreme Court of Poland has ruled that "the use of a reproduced work by an enterprise for the purposes of that enterprise" is by definition not within the scope of private fair use.

For practical reasons, private fair use does not only apply to the user but extends to those within a personal relationship with the user. The Copyright Act provides examples of interpersonal relationships that fall under the concept of "personal relationship": family, affinity, and social relationships. The first two are defined in the Family and Guardianship Code, and their meaning is clear. There are uncertainties regarding the undefined terms in the Act, such as "other personal relationship" and "social relationship".

When interpreting these terms, it is important to keep in mind the purpose of private fair use, which is to allow use in the private sphere rather than the public sphere. Private use of a work that is simultaneously made publicly available (for example, via peer-to-peer networks) exceeds the scope of fair use. A personal relationship involves emotional bonds and frequent contact, regardless of the form of communication. It does not matter if these relationships have been formed or are maintained primarily through the Internet. What matters is a constant, informal, private bond. Strictly professional relationships, as well as those stemming from social or political functions, are excluded from private fair use.

There is no limitation on the number of people using the work collectively under private fair use. There are customary forms of use, such as at social events, where it is difficult to definitively decide whether the use falls within the limits of fair use.

=== Use of works ===
==== Concept of use ====
The Copyright Act does not specify in which fields of exploitation (in what ways) works may be used. Generally speaking, the use of works includes their fixation, reproduction, and distribution. In principle, all forms of use across all known fields of exploitation are covered by private fair use. There is also a view that fair use extends to future fields of exploitation. Thus, the legislature granted users greater freedom compared to the laws of 1926 and 1952, which explicitly allowed only copying and other forms of reproduction. In practice, the most significant aspect of fair use is the reproduction (copying) of protected works.

==== Prior distribution of a work ====
Private fair use applies only to works that have been distributed (made available to the public with the author's consent). Fair use does not infringe on moral rights, including the right to decide on the first public disclosure of a work. Therefore, using a copy of a work (even a fragment) that has "leaked" from a closed screening is not permitted. The situation becomes more complex when using works on a computer network. A work is not considered distributed if it has only been introduced into a closed network.

==== Legality of the source copy ====
The legal systems of some European countries (e.g., Germany, Finland) prohibit invoking fair use when using a copy of a work that was created or made available in violation of copyright law. The Polish Copyright Act does not include a requirement for the legality of the source copy. Determining whether a copy is legal would be difficult for users.

In 2014, the Court of Justice of the European Union ruled that national laws failing to differentiate between "a situation where the source used to make a private copy is legal and a situation where the source is illegal" are incompatible with Directive 2001/29/EC on the harmonization of certain aspects of copyright and related rights in the information society. The Polish legislature should introduce such a distinction. One proposal suggests allowing the use of illegal copies of a work that are not "obviously unlawful". This would protect users acting in good faith. However, the criterion of a legal source copy is vague, and a general definition of it is impossible.

==== Limiting the number or volume of copies used ====
In 2004, an amendment to the 1994 Copyright Act introduced a requirement in Article 23, Section 2, that users could only use "individual copies" of works. A strict interpretation of the terms used could lead to the conclusion that the law excludes copying works from the scope of fair use. Some lawyers argue that it is permissible to make a single copy of a work on one medium. However, most experts believe that this formulation is grammatically incorrect. The requirement to use "individual copies" of works should be interpreted as a prohibition on making an unlimited number of copies of works. Any other terms that could replace "individual copies" are also ambiguous.

The Copyright Act does not limit fair use to using only specific parts of a work or a certain number of pages in a book, nor does it set other "reasonable limits". Such limitations would need to be justified by the losses copyright holders incur due to decreased demand for original copies. The phenomenon of unlimited copying should be regulated by the Berne three-step test. It is also possible to argue that the absence of a limit is intentional.

==== Reproduction by third parties ====
Fair use involves the individual use of someone else's work. Reproductions can only be made by natural persons. It applies only to those who intend to use copies of the works. Some lawyers allow for assistance that does not interfere with the exclusive rights of the author.

A socially significant activity is paid reproduction made at the request of a user for their personal use (e.g., photocopying services, data archiving). Fair use does not cover such activities. This is regulated by Article 201 of the Copyright Act.

==== Use of digital forms of works ====
The use of the term "copy" in Article 23, Section 2 of the Copyright Act may lead to the conclusion that fair use does not extend to digital forms of works. This position has been known for some time, with arguments claiming that digital reproduction is mechanical and impersonal. It has also been argued that fair use provisions cannot cover exploitation fields that were unknown when the law was enacted. Some have proposed treating digital forms of works similarly to computer programs, which are excluded from fair use. However, the prevailing view is that the form of the work (analog vs. digital) is a technical issue and does not affect the scope of fair use.

==== Purpose of use ====
The Copyright Act does not define the purpose of using a protected work, except that it must be personal. The purpose can be recreational, hobby-related, scientific, or archival. However, copying a work for hobby purposes by someone previously unknown, without payment, falls outside the scope of fair use. It seems that "own professional purpose" is also permissible, as long as the user uses the work on their own initiative and for their own needs, i.e., without direct orders from a superior.

The condition of non-commercial use in the case of private fair use means that charging fees for the use of the work by the user from associated persons is not allowed. Interpretation of the Copyright Act in accordance with Article 5, Section 2(b) of Directive 2001/29/EC leads to the conclusion that this requirement has a broader meaning. According to this provision, use for directly or indirectly commercial purposes is not allowed. As noted, almost any use of a work that is not purely recreational can be considered indirectly commercial, especially when it is linked to the user's professional activity.

== Legal nature ==
=== Admissibility of contractual modification ===
The admissibility of contractual modifications of fair use primarily depends on whether Article 23 of the Copyright Act is considered a peremptory norm or a default rule. This is especially relevant to the possibility of limiting the scope of private fair use in contracts.

For a long time, copyright holders did not interfere with users' private domain. It was only professional video rental services that typically included contracts with consumers prohibiting copying and distributing works. The same practice is followed by creators of digital works, such as electronic databases and software. This situation arises from the dual aim of ensuring flexibility in the allowed use of works while also seeking to control their use.

Article 23 of the Copyright Act does not address this issue, and the absence of a specific provision is typical in European legal systems. Exceptionally, Directive 2009/24/EC on the legal protection of computer programs, and consequently Article 76 of the Copyright Act, provides that contracts limiting "fair use of computer programs" are invalid. The argumentum e contrario and the principle of freedom of contract suggest that contractual modifications of fair use are permissible.

Most legal doctrine seems to support this view. A provision modifying the scope of fair use would be binding only on the parties to the contract, and its violation would lead to liability for breach of contract. Relevant to this is point 45 of Directive 2001/29/EC, which states that "exceptions and limitations should not prevent the establishment of contractual arrangements aiming at providing fair compensation to copyright holders as permitted by national law". Furthermore, the provisions of Directive 2001/29/EC do not require the establishment of private fair use in national law.

There is also a concept that justifies the possibility of both limiting and excluding private fair use contractually. According to this, users would have a subjective right to fair use and could agree to change the scope of their right. Rejecting this concept means that a user can only commit to refraining from exercising their rights. Another view holds that fair use cannot be modified and that the freedom of contract is limited.

There are limits to the freedom of modifying private fair use contractually. An agreement should not contradict the statutory balance of interests between the copyright holder and the user. It should not undermine the values protected by the law through the institution of fair use. A separate issue is the relationship between modifications of fair use and competition and consumer protection laws. For instance, contractual modifications should not allow the abuse of the copyright holder's monopoly position. Flexible, individually negotiated concessions between licensors and licensees are viewed positively. Lowering license fees or providing users with conveniences in their use of fair use may be considered an "equivalent" to modifying the scope of fair use. A particularly effective approach is the differentiation of prices related to specific modifications.

=== Compensation for private fair use ===
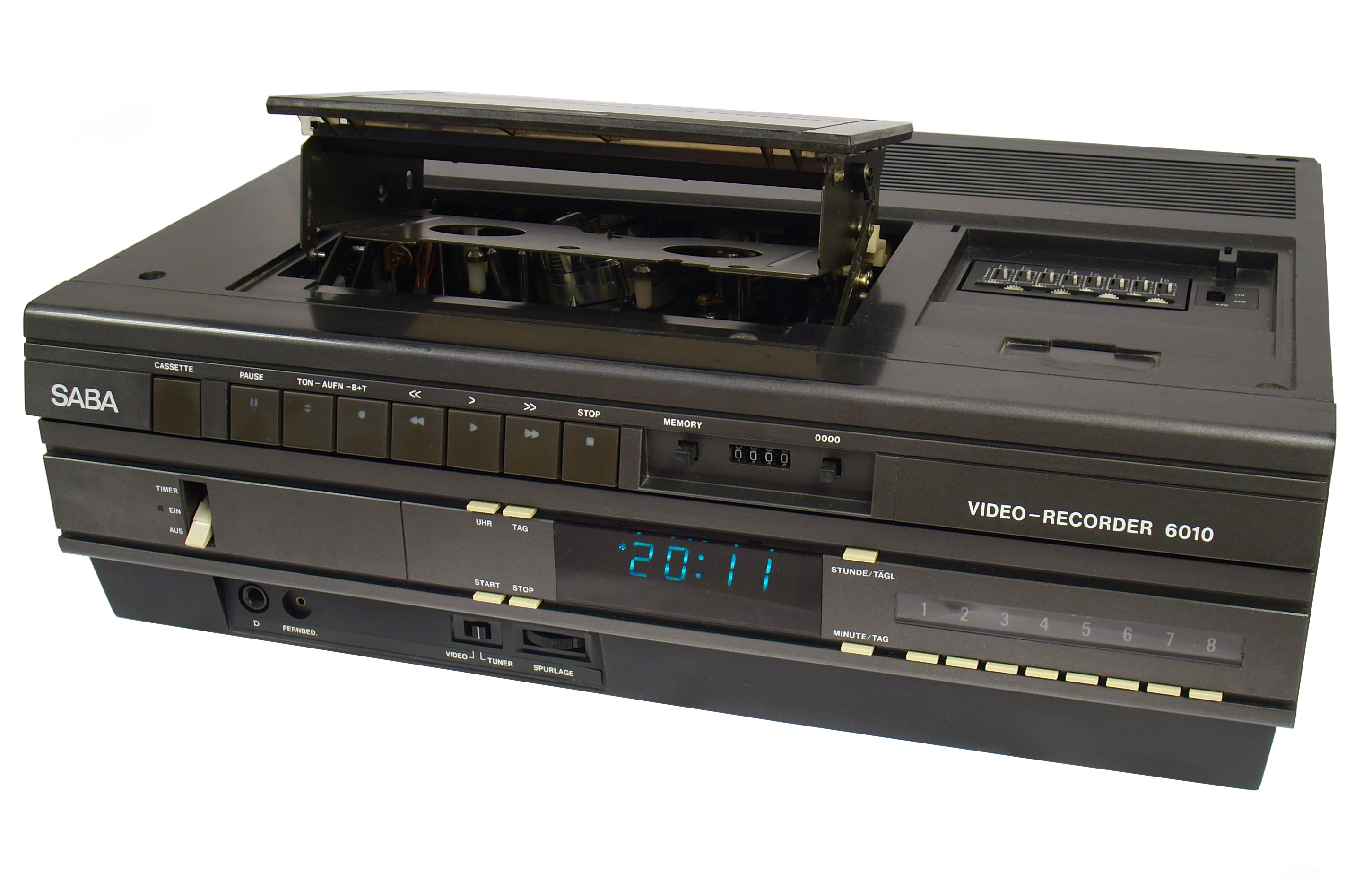
In the 20th century, it was observed that private copying to video tapes reduced the income of creators

In most national legal systems, private fair use is not linked to the obligation to compensate copyright holders. In Polish law, the principle of no compensation for fair use is established in Article 34 of the Copyright Act. However, under European Union law, there is a specific provision that obliges national legislators to ensure "fair compensation" for copyright holders.

This concept of compensation arises from the accepted theory of lost sales, where reproducing a work can cause harm to the copyright holder. In the case of Padawan SL v. Sociedad General de Autores y Editores de España, the European Court of Justice ruled that the user is generally responsible for compensating the harm caused by reproduction, often by financing the compensation. The entities required to pay the "private use license fee" can include those providing equipment for the reproduction of works, and they may pass on this cost to users. These fees are called private copying levys. The Copyright Act mandates reprographic fees in Articles 20 and 201, with Article 20(5) leading to the issuance of a relevant executive regulation.

Legal experts do not agree on the legal nature of private copying levys. The prevailing view is that these levys are a special form of author compensation. Some argue that only levys paid under Article 201 of the Copyright Act are a form of compensation, while others claim that Article 20 of the same law breaks the declared non-payment rule for fair use. It has even been noted that Article 34 "does not fully reflect reality". Some argue that these levys are author compensation, even though they do not meet the characteristics of traditional author compensation. The affiliation of these levys with exclusive rights may stem from the fact that the three-step test does not apply to private use of works.

=== Private fair use and criminal law ===
Using someone else's work under fair use excludes the unlawfulness of the act, which might otherwise be considered a crime under Chapter 14 of the Copyright Act, titled "Criminal Liability". It can be argued that private fair use is a "special form of justification". Acting within the limits of private fair use is not considered distributing someone else's work without authorization, as stated in Article 116(1) of the Copyright Act. Possessing devices or components intended to remove or bypass technical protection measures of works may still be used for actions within the scope of private fair use. Proving this fact practically prevents the application of Article 1181 of the Copyright Act.

== Exclusions ==
=== Electronic databases ===
The definition of databases and their protection is provided in a separate law. This protection covers the systematic collection of elements (content), while copyright protection covers the creative compilation (form). Therefore, databases that are not creative are not subject to copyright laws.

The protection of electronic, creative databases is broad because it generally covers all forms of use, with the legal user benefiting from statutory licensing. However, this protection does not extend to elements of databases that may be independent works, nor does it apply to use within the scope defined in Article 7 of the Database Protection Act. The Copyright Act's Article 171 additionally defines a certain scope of freedom. According to some lawyers, this provision should be included under the fair use rules.

The exclusion from private fair use means that it does not cover the use of electronic databases that are considered works. This exclusion protects the interests of the entity that made a "substantial investment in the creation, verification, or presentation of the database content". On the other hand, Article 8(1)(1) of the Database Protection Act, relating to non-electronic databases, grants the user some freedom regarding private use.

The exclusion from private fair use does not apply to the scientific use of creative electronic databases that is not for commercial purposes. The exclusion of commercial purposes has been criticized, as it could be assumed that academic employees or institutions could not invoke fair use. However, taking into account Recital 36 of Directive 96/9/EC, use for educational and scientific purposes is allowed. The absence of this exception would limit the possibility of scientific activity.

=== Computer programs ===
Computer programs are protected similarly to literary works, but they form a distinct category and are subject to a special (separate) protection model. These issues are regulated by the provisions of Directive 2009/24/EC on the legal protection of computer programs and Chapter 7 of the Copyright Act. The scope of protection for computer programs is broader than that for other categories of works, including the exclusion of private fair use, the prohibition of adaptations, and modifications of computer programs.

Article 75 of the Copyright Act allows some freedom in the private use of a program. The legal nature of these specific provisions is unclear. The provisions of Article 75 are referred to as statutory licenses, "private fair use concerning computer programs", or "forms of fair use". They compensate (to some extent) the lack of private fair use. There is an opinion that the general limitations of fair use from Articles 34 and 35 should also apply to the provisions of Article 75.

The "private fair use of a computer program" (similarly to the provisions allowing the use of electronic creative databases and unlike "traditional", analog fair use) applies to the legal user. Under certain conditions, the user may perform some actions within the scope of copyright monopolies. These conditions include the absence of another regulation in the licensing agreement and the necessity to use the program according to its intended purpose. If the legal user is a licensee, they may have no influence over the licensing agreement's content (such as shrink-wrap agreements). Moreover, the vague term "intended purpose" should be interpreted in each specific case. Importantly, the legal user is entitled to create a backup copy of the computer program, observe, study, and test its final version, and decompile the program to ensure compatibility.

There are products in which the essential element is a computer program, such as multimedia products, electronic databases, or video games. Some experts advocate extending the protection principles of computer programs to such complex products. This is supported by a restrictive interpretation of the provisions limiting the copyright monopoly. Others refer to this reasoning as "contamination by regulation" and propose separate treatment of the computer program and other creative elements of a complex work. However, such a solution does not resolve practical issues.

=== Architectural works ===
Article 23 of the Copyright Act excludes architectural and architectural-urban works from private fair use in one field of exploitation – construction based on such works. This exclusion was also present in the copyright acts of 1926 and 1952, where it applied to construction based on an architectural work.

Various considerations support this exclusion. The primary factor appears to be financial: granting a license for construction is one of the main elements of a building investment and the principal way of exploiting an architectural or architectural-urban work under copyright. Proponents of this view argue that granting users the freedom of fair use in this regard would contradict the restriction imposed by the three-step test. No less important are the personal needs of licensees, particularly the uniqueness of a building and the need to ensure the privacy of its users.

Opponents argue that economic analysis does not justify such an exclusion. According to this view, the provision applies in practice only when constructing a building without the author's consent does not involve exposing the work to public view. Furthermore, they question the need to extend the exclusion to architectural-urban works.

The use of the term "construction" suggests that the exclusion applies only to those forms of architectural and architectural-urban works that can be used to erect buildings within the meaning of a building code. Therefore, miniatures are not subject to this exclusion. Excluding one field of exploitation – perhaps "practically the only one" – leads to the conclusion that, theoretically, fair use covers all other forms of use, such as reproducing the design of a work or photographing an architectural work.

== See also ==
- Fair use (Poland)
- Fair use

== Bibliography ==
- Barta, J.; Markiewicz, R. (2016). Prawo autorskie [Copyright Law] (in Polish). Warsaw: Wolters Kluwer. ISBN 978-83-264-9694-3.
- Gienas, K. (2016). "Komentarz do art. 23" [Commentary on Article 23]. In Drzewiecki, A. (ed.). Ustawa o prawie autorskim i prawach pokrewnych: komentarz [The Copyright and Related Rights Act: Commentary] (in Polish). Warsaw: C. H. Beck. ISBN 978-83-255-8504-4.
- Machała, W. (2003). Dozwolony użytek prywatny w polskim prawie autorskim [Private Fair Use in Polish Copyright Law] (in Polish). Warsaw: Liber. ISBN 83-7206-097-5.
- Preussner-Zamorska, J.; Marcinkowska, J.; Laskowska, E. (2017). "Dozwolony użytek chronionych utworów" [Fair Use of Protected Works]. In Barta, J. (ed.). Prawo autorskie [Copyright Law] (in Polish). Warsaw: C.H. Beck. ISBN 978-83-255-8754-3.
- Szczotka, J. (2013). Najem i użyczenie egzemplarzy utworu jako odrębne pola eksploatacji [Rental and Lending of Copies of a Work as Separate Fields of Exploitation] (in Polish). Warsaw: Wolters Kluwer Polska. ISBN 978-83-264-4142-4.
