= Man of Many =

Australian independent digital lifestyle magazine

- Website type: Digital Media, News
- Available in: English
- Founded: 2012
- Headquarters: Darlinghurst, New South Wales
- Country of origin: Australia
- Owner: Man of Many Pty Ltd
- Founders: Scott Purcell; Frank Arthur
- Key people: (2020 - present) Nick Hall, Editor; (2015–2019) Joe Cutcliffe, Editor
- Industry: Online Media
- Website: manofmany.com
- Commercial: Yes
- Current status: Active

Man of Many is an Australian independent digital lifestyle publication and website founded by Scott Purcell and Frank Arthur in 2012 that focuses on men's lifestyle, technology and consumer product news.

== History ==
Man of Many was founded in December 2012 by Scott Purcell and Frank Arthur as a publication covering consumer product news, technology and pop-culture content. The original concept behind the website was to report product news and announcements but the platform has since expanded to feature long-form editorials, interviews and local news and lifestyle content, on community issues such as men's mental health and sustainability.

In 2018, the publication announced a rebrand and launched a new website design in partnership with Sydney-based creative agency Canvas Group.

In January 2021, Man of Many publicly expressed concern about the impact of the proposed News Media Bargaining Code on independent publishers in Australia as well as in its formal submission to the Senate Economics Legislation Committee. The publication was also strongly opposed to Facebook blocking news content on its platform in Australia in February 2021 as a response to the proposed code.

In April 2021, Man of Many launched an e-commerce store called the Man of Many Shop. In July 2021, the publication partnered with other large digital publishers in the Australian market to pledge to publish clear and concise messaging to help drive COVID-19 vaccinations.

In September 2021, Man of Many won Media Brand of the Year in the 2021 Mumbrella Publish Awards and was announced as a founding member of the Digital Publishers' Alliance (DPA) which collectively advocates for leading independent publications in Australia around key industry issues.

In January 2022, Man of Many became the first Australian publisher to sign on with Ipsos, the new exclusive and preferred source of digital audience measurement data to the national Interactive Advertising Bureau (IAB). In April 2022, the publication released a limited-edition single-barrel whiskey in partnership with Oregon distillery Westward Whiskey.

In its submission to the federal treasury's review of the Media Bargaining Code, Man of Many argued that small publishers were at a severe disadvantage to the large media players as a result of the code.

In June 2022, Man of Many was appointed as a member of the Australian Press Council. In August 2022, Man of Many partnered with the Waves of Wellness Foundation, a mental health surf-therapy charity, funding a surfing programme for at-risk youth in New South Wales.

In August 2022, the Australian Communications and Media Authority (ACMA) found Man of Many eligible as a registered news business under the News Media Bargaining Code (the Code).

In September 2022, Man of Many became the first digital publisher to achieve a 100 percent carbon-neutral certification under the Australian Federal Government's Climate Active standard. By its tenth anniversary in December 2022, the publication reported over 40 million unique visitors and 75 million pageviews globally over the preceding year.

In June 2023, Man of Many launched a ChatGPT plugin. The following month, it introduced an on-site AI chatbot, "Ask Man of Many", built with Chatling.ai.

In late 2024, the publication launched a redesigned website in collaboration with New Zealand-based agency Daylight Creative. Around the same time, it began releasing themed digital editions, featuring cover stars such as Alexandra Daddario, Patrick Dempsey, G Flip, and Max Verstappen on editions like 'Creation', 'Trailblazers', and 'ICONS'. In April 2025, it was recertified under the Climate Active standard for the third consecutive year. In June 2025, Man of Many announced partnerships with TollBit and ProRata.AI to monitor and license its content for use by AI crawlers.

The publication launched its 'Man of Many 2.0' strategy in July 2025, which introduced a Podcast Network, user sign-in system and eight new newsletter verticals.

== Awards and recognition ==
Man of Many has been recognised with several industry awards. Notable among them include:

- Media Brand of the Year | Mumbrella Awards, 2025
- Website of the Year | Mumbrella Publish Awards, 2024
- B&T Award for the Planet | B&T Awards, 2024
- Gold, Best Native Advertising | Digital Media Awards Asia, 2024
- Best Media Platform | B&T Awards, 2023
- Website of the Year | Mumbrella Publish Awards, 2023
- Best Engagement Strategy | Mumbrella Publish Awards, 2023
- Publish Leader of the Year | Mumbrella Publish Awards, 2023
- Finalist, Best Media Platform | B&T Awards, 2022 & 2023
- Best Publisher-Led Advertising Campaign | Mumbrella Publish Awards, 2022
- High-Growth Companies Asia-Pacific 2022 | Financial Times, 2022
- AFR Fast 100 List | Australian Financial Review, 2021
- Media Brand of the Year | Mumbrella Publish Awards, 2021
- Consumer Publication of the Year | Mumbrella Publish Awards, 2021
- Newsletter of the Year | Mumbrella Publish Awards, 2021
- Website of the Year | Mumbrella Publish Awards, 2020
