= Copyright law of Poland =

In Poland, copyright is regulated by the act from 1994.

The first Polish copyright law act has been enacted in 1926 (although copyright issues have been regulated on territories of partitioned Poland in the 19th century by governments of the German Empire, the Russian Empire and Austro-Hungary, beginning with the 1828 copyright law passed in Tsarist Russia). Poland signed the Berne Convention in 1919, soon after regaining its independence in 1918.

The main acts that have regulated Polish copyright law have been:

- Polish Copyright Law from 1926 (Polish original, amended version from 1935) (Dz.U. RP 1935; Pos. 260)
- Polish Copyright Law from 1926 (Polish original, amended in 1952) (Dz.U.52.34.234)
- Polish Copyright Law from 4 February 1994 (Polish original) (Dz. U. nr 80 z 2000r. poz. 904)
- Polish Copyright Law from 4 February 1994 (English)

Polish copyright law complies to a large extent with legislation in European Union, see EU Copyright Directive.

According to the Art.3 of copyright law of 29 March 1926 (valid until 1952) and Art. 2 of copyright law of 10 July 1952 of the People's Republic of Poland, all photographs by Polish photographers (or published for the first time in Poland or simultaneously in Poland and abroad) printed without a clear copyright notice before the law was changed on 23 May 1994 are public domain. Status of those photographs did not change after Polish Copyright Law of 4 February 1994 was enacted. (See: Template:PD-Polish)

According to the Polish Copyright Law of 4 February 1994 (Article 4, case 2) "governmental symbols, documents, materials and signs are not subject to copyrights". However, in some instances the use of this image in Poland might be regulated by other laws. It is being debated if postage stamps fall into this category. (See: Template:PD-Polishsymbol)

According to the Art.21 of copyright law of 29 March 1926 (valid until 1952) photographs lose copyright protection ten years after picture was taken. Series of scientific or artistic pictures lose copyright protection after 50 years. According to Art. 27 of copyright law of 10 July 1952 (valid until 23 May 1994) photographs and series of photographs lose copyright protection ten years after publication date.

The copyright act from 4 February 1994 in article 33 point 1 allows the propagation of works that are permanently exhibited on the publicly accessible roads, streets, squares or gardens provided that the propagation is not for the same use. The name of the creator and source should be provided if it is possible by article 34. This use is royalty free, provided that it does not harm the legitimate interests of the creator by article 34.

Polish copyright law prohibits copyright for:

1. legislative acts and their official drafts,
2. official documents, materials, logos and symbols,
3. published patent specifications and industrial design specifications,
4. simple press information.

== Freedom of panorama ==
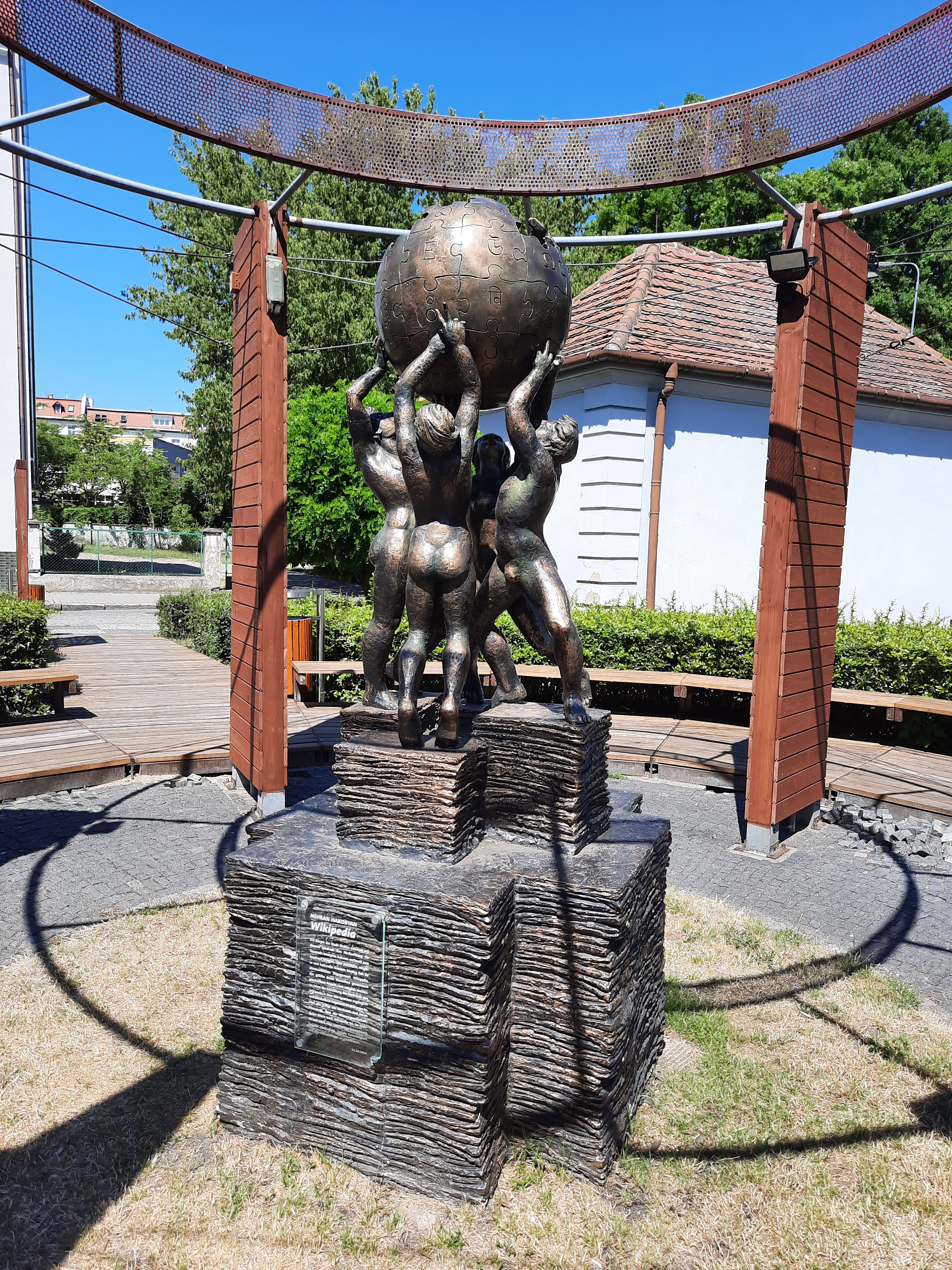
Wikipedia Monument, unveiled in 2014 and authored by Armenian sculptor Mihran Hakobyan

There is adequate freedom of panorama in Poland, guaranteed by Article 33(1) of the Act on Copyright and Related Rights. It states that "it is permissible to disseminate works permanently displayed in generally accessible roads, streets, squares or gardens, but not for the same use." Distribution is through the use of photographs or pictorial representations of works (such as buildings and public sculptures) in any media, including commercial video games and apps. Because the purpose of a photograph of such a work (such as an office building, a shopping mall, or a bridge) is not the same as the original purpose of establishing a work, it is a permissible use under national copyright law.

== See also ==
- Copyright
- Fair use (Poland)
- Public domain
