= GIM Trading =

Company linked to scams

Global Investment Marketing Pty Ltd (also known as GIM Trading) has been linked to losses of almost $8 million since early 2024, according to reports filed with the National Anti-Scam Centre. The firm sold fake bonds to ordinary investors who thought they were purchasing low-risk government and corporate securities.

An office address at 80 Ann Street was described as the Queensland office of GIM Trading in promotional material sent to customers. The company also paid for a virtual office on Level 10 of 440 Collins Street in Melbourne to mislead investors. In a press release, GIM Trading said it was also opening three new offices in Sydney, Brisbane and Adelaide.

== Key Personnel ==
The original owner of GIM Trading was Hilton Wood. Mr Wood said he sold the business to "a buyer by the name of Stephen Cubis", and it was transferred without any clients, before any money was raised. But this was denied by Mr Cubis.

Stephen Cubis, a Gold Coast-based musician from New Zealand, was the public face and director of GIM Trading for six months ending in late October 2024. During this period, he was the sole shareholder. Company materials described him as the CEO. Mr Cubis said he was paid a weekly retainer of $500, plus 1 per cent of the transfers made from the business bank account, to move money on instructions from two men, including one based overseas, whom he knew only by the man's initials. His instructions came via an encrypted messaging app called Signal. Cubis admitted he suspected fraudulent activity was occurring. He claimed his involvement ended after he changed the company's bank account password, causing a falling out with two men. Court records show Mr Cubis is also facing nine criminal charges on unrelated matters, including driving offences. He was arrested in Brisbane for failing to appear in court.

Company records show 57-year-old Darren Michael Geddes took over as GIM's director in late October 2024. Following orders granted by the Federal Court of Australia, the Gold Coast-based businessman cannot leave Australia until March 2026, after the Australian Securities and Investments Commission (ASIC) sought restraint orders. He is also prohibited from applying for new travel documents and must hand over any international travel tickets purchased for the next 12 months. He faces "imprisonment, sequestration of property or other punishment" if he disobeys. Anyone who knowingly helps him breach the travel restrictions could face similar consequences.

== Misconduct ==
A misconduct report about Stephen Cubis and GIM Trading was made to the ASIC in September 2024. It was alleged that GIM trading was "making claims that are untrue" and was likely "a scam operated by Stephen Cubis" or someone else. The report included screenshots of a LinkedIn profile for Mr Cubis, which is no longer online, allegedly showing a fake work history as an investment banking analyst with Macquarie and as a financial analyst with CMC Markets. Both Macquarie and CMC Markets have no records of Mr Cubis working there. Mr Cubis denied being involved in creating a fraudulent resume or saying he had a finance background.

An affidavit alleged that approximately $23 million was paid to GIM's Australian bank accounts between April 2024 and March 2025 by approximately 80 Australian consumers. Their funds were sent to a Gold Coast money exchange called TorFx, then sent to companies in Hong Kong. The bank accounts were controlled either by Stephen Cubis or Darren Geddes. They were responsible for transferring approximately $17 million to offshore bank accounts. The company became part of a broader investigation by the Australian Federal Police across South-East Asia and Eastern Europe, named Operation Firestorm, which was responsible for probing offshore criminal syndicates operating large call centres known as "boiler rooms" to take money from Australians and send it offshore. ASIC placed the company on the Investor Alert List and obtained travel restraint orders against Darren Geddes in September 2025.

The National Anti-Scam Centre received 38 reports to Scamwatch of almost $8 million in losses related to the company since the beginning of 2024.

== Fake credentials ==
The website for GIM Trading listed a financial services licence (or AFSL) which belonged to Pulse Markets. They were acting as an authorised representative and used their licence for four months until early January 2025. When GIM became unlicensed, ASIC issued a warning to investors in mid-February.

The 16-page investment guide for the company also mentioned bonds with the Canadian government and major Australian and international companies, including HSBC Bank, Barclays, JP Morgan, Ford and WA mining company MinRes. None said they had a relationship with GIM. Some confirmed bonds in the guide were real products, but details were incorrect, such as the rate of return.

Cybercrime investigator Ken Gamble, from IFW Global, was hired by seven clients to investigate Stephen Cubis and others associated with GIM. His resume lists him as having graduated from Sydney University with a Bachelor of Commerce and worked as an investment banking analyst with Macquarie — however, neither Sydney University nor Macquarie has any records of Mr Cubis.

Bank records show that between October and December 2024, customers paid their life savings to a Commonwealth Bank (CBA) account operated by GIM Trading. CBA received information that GIM may not be a genuine financial services business, and stopped the account. Two days later, CBA wrote to other banks, warning them about suspicious transactions and asking them to investigate. Macquarie also posted on its website in December, accusing GIM Trading of running a bond scam. Payments to GIM were also being made into another company account with National Australia Bank (NAB). GIM Trading was also using a money exchange based at Surfers Paradise on the Gold Coast called TorFx.

== Offshore criminal syndicate ==
According to a private investigator, an offshore criminal syndicate was involved in buying the company and impersonating a company director during the sale process. Hilton Wood said that together with his business partner, they advertised the company and agreed to sell it to Mr Cubis for $220,000 after communicating over phone and email. He was told to expect payment from an overseas company. The payment arrived in his lawyer's trust account from a Hong Kong company called Aoding Trade Limited with a Chinese director from Hunan Province.
