= National Anti-Scam Centre =

Consumer protection agency of the Australian Government

Agency overview
- Formed: 2023
- Jurisdiction: Australia
- Minister responsible: Stephen Jones, Assistant Treasurer
- Agency executive: Catriona Lowe, Chair
- Parent agency: Australian Competition & Consumer Commission
- Website: nasc.gov.au

The National Anti-Scam Centre (NASC) is a consumer protection subagency of the Government of Australia, located within the Australian Competition & Consumer Commission. Established in 2023, the mandate of the NASC is to address scams and online fraud by collaborating with domestic and international government agencies, law enforcement and industry bodies.

== History ==
In 2022, the Australian economy lost $3.1 billion in reported losses to scams, almost doubling by 80% from those recorded in the previous year. The creation of the NASC was a commitment of the Labor Shadow Minister for Financial Services Stephen Jones prior to the 2022 Australian federal election, with a stated aim of bringing together banks, law enforcement, telecommunications, regulators and technology companies to share information to disrupt scam activity. The NASC was established in July 2023, following a $58 million investment by the Albanese government.

== Functions ==
The NASC runs annual taskforces named "fusion cells" to develop solutions to specific scam trends with government agencies and industry partners. The first fusion cell, targeting investment scams, received involvement from the Australian Competition & Consumer Commission (ACCC), Australian Securities & Investments Commission (ASIC) and banks, telecoms and digital platforms. In June 2024, the NASC entered an industry intelligence sharing partnership with the Australian Financial Crimes Exchange, allowing the Centre to receive scam information reported to participating banks and vice-versa.

== Notable cases ==
The National Anti-Scam Centre received 38 reports to Scamwatch of almost $8 million in losses related to the GIM Trading since the beginning of 2024.
