= Copyright expiration in Australia =

Terms of copyright duration in Australia

Copyright expiry in Australia depends on when a work was created, and on the type of work. Under the Copyright Act 1968, copyright usually expires 70 years after the calendar year in which the author died, or for anonymous works, 70 years after the calendar year in which the work was first published. Copyright in a work owned by the Commonwealth of Australia or a state or territory expires 50 years after the calendar year in which the material was made or first published. When the author of a literary, dramatic or musical work (other than a computer program or a photograph) is known, copyright expires 50 years after the calendar year in which the author died.

== Entry of photos into the public domain ==
Photographs taken before 1955 are now in the public domain.

- Photographs taken since 1955 will not be in the public domain until 1 January 2026 at the earliest, unless under crown copyright which expires 50 years after first publication.

Any photo, published or unpublished, anonymous or attributed, taken before 1 January 1955 is out of copyright and in the public domain. The Australian Copyright Council is quite specific and unambiguous in regard to copyright law on photographs taken prior to 1 January 1955:

"If photographs were taken prior to 1 January 1955, copyright has now expired."

"The duration of copyright in photographs has changed significantly as a result of Australia implementing its obligations under the Australia-US Free Trade Agreement (AUSFTA). New rules have been introduced to determine the duration of photographs that were still protected by copyright on 1 January 2005 or that were taken after that date. These rules came into effect on 1 January 2005:

"For photographs which were still in copyright on 1 January 2005, or which were created on or after that date, copyright now lasts until 70 years from the end of the year the photographer died.

"If the photographer is unknown or used a pseudonym, duration continues indefinitely until the photograph is published. Once it is published, duration will then last until 70 years from the end of the year in which it was published

"All photographs taken before 1 January 1955 are now out of copyright and do not benefit from the new rules."

== Copyright term ==
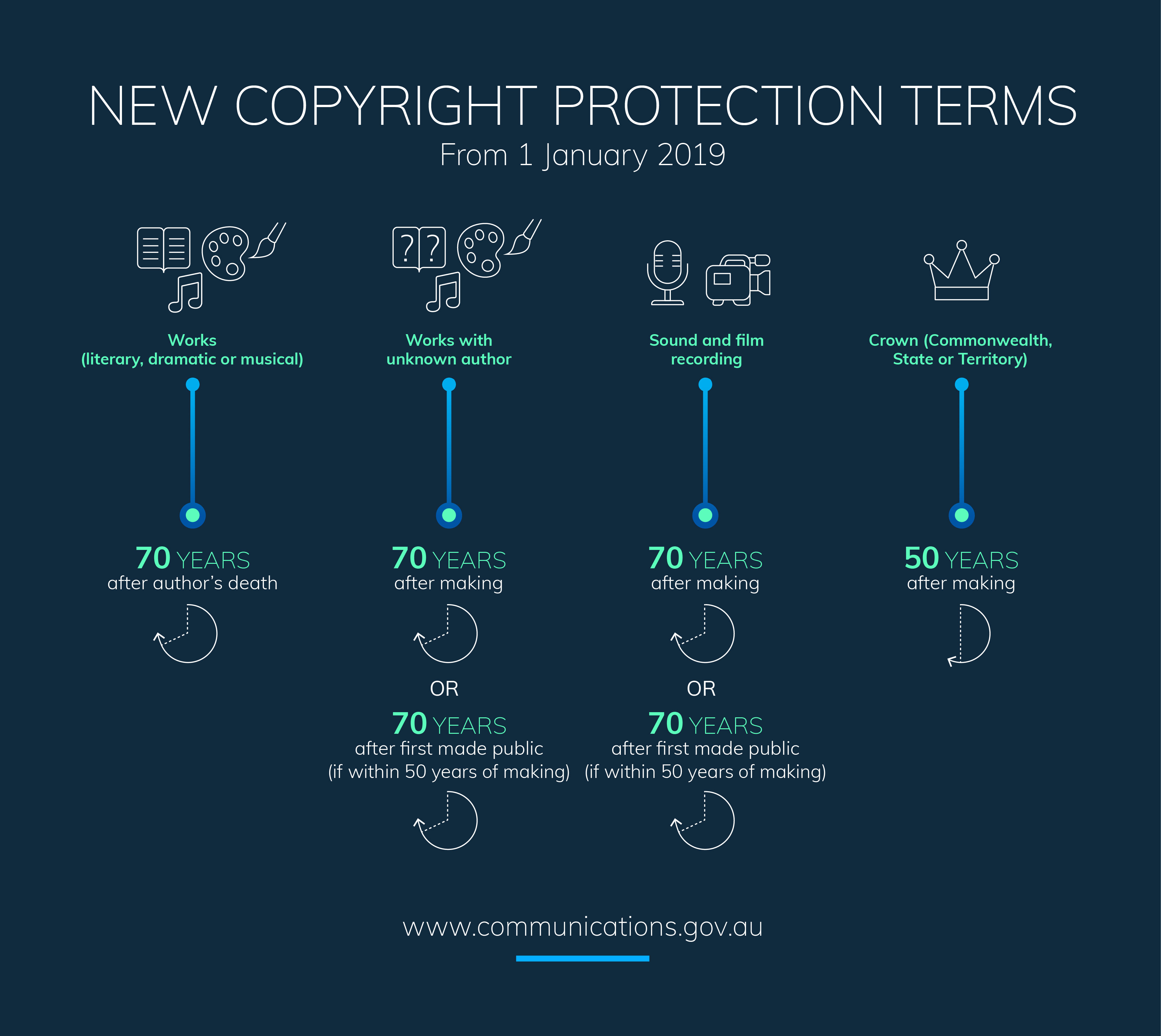
For material created or published since 1 January 2019, the rules are simpler.

Under the old pre-FTA system, all photos taken before 1 January 1969 were out of copyright 50 years from when taken. After 1 January 1969, it was 50 years from the end of the year it was first published. Thus, when the FTA came into effect on 1 January 2005, only photos taken before 1 January 1955 were out of copyright under the old system. Now, for a photo taken on or after 1 January 1955, copyright for non-Crown Copyright photos is "life of creator plus 70".

Copyright in the words for a newspaper article (or in a drawing) is owned by the writer (or illustrator, et al.). If the writer died before 1 January 1955, the work is out of copyright; alternatively if the author is unknown (and cannot be discovered by reasonable enquiry), and if first published before 1 January 1955, the work is out of copyright. Copyright in the layout expires 25 years after the end of the year in which it was first published. For artistic works other than photographs and engravings (so including drawings, paintings, sculpture) it was "life plus 50" and is now "life plus 70". If the creator is unknown, it was "first published plus 50" and is now "first published plus 70". So if the creator died before 1 January 1955 or is unknown and the work was first published before 1 January 1955, the work is out of copyright. This in general applies even if the creator was an employee of the newspaper which holds the actual copyright.

For artistic works other than photographs and engravings (therefore including drawings, paintings, sculpture) it was "life plus 50" and is now "life plus 70". If the creator is unknown, it was "first published plus 50" and is now "first published plus 70". So if the creator died before 1 January 1955 or is unknown and the work was first published on or before 31 December 1954, the work is out of copyright. This in general applies even if the creator was an employee of the newspaper that owns the copyright.

For works whose copyright is owned by the Commonwealth of Australia or an Australian state or territory, including photographs, copyright expires 50 years from the end of the year in which they were made or first published. Thus in 2026, government-owned images made or first published on or before 31 December 1975 are out of copyright. (Note: The year shown in this sentence is automatically updated on 1 January each year.) The Australian Government has declared that the expiry of such copyrights applies worldwide. (Note: This has been confirmed to the Wikimedia Foundation in VRTS ticket # 2017062010010417.)

In 2015, ALIA announced a campaign called "Cooking for Copyright", highlighting the perpetual copyright status of unpublished works such as diaries, letters, company records and handwritten recipes. Recipes including Captain Cook's carrot marmalade were published on FAIR's website, breaking the existing law. In June 2017, a law was passed which included a "life of the author plus 70 years" copyright term for unpublished works, which came into effect on 1 January 2019.

== Works held in libraries ==
The National Library Picture Catalogue states that permission must be asked to copy photos from their site. However, in the case of images taken before 1955, it is seen as possibly being a request with no legal basis because the images are public domain (when copied within Australia). Once something is in the public domain, the copyright belongs to everyone. An argument given by the British Library online is that "The original work(s) are in the public domain, the copies the Library supplies are in copyright as they are new copies of the original materials which are what copyright is held. This is why you will need to clear permission." The National Library, for its part, states that photographs taken before 1 January 1955 are indeed "all out of copyright", but requires a formal declaration of intent to publish, and an acknowledgement of the National Library "as custodian of the material" The State Library of Victoria, which does not hold copyright for some of its works says that "It must be stressed that obtaining permission to reproduce an item is not the same as copyright. The State Library of Victoria often does not hold the copyright for items in its collections"

== Foreign works ==
Under lex loci protectionis, a court in a particular country will apply its own copyright laws when determining expiry dates. Under Part VIII, Division 1, of Australian copyright law, foreign works, foreign citizens, and foreign residents are treated as though Australian, provided the foreign country is party to a relevant international agreement and gives "adequate protection" to owners of copyright. Australia does not apply the rule of the shorter term, so the expiry date of a work in its country of origin has no effect on its status in Australia.

== Comparison with United States copyright law ==
- Works published outside the United States before 1978 without compliance with US formalities that are in the public domain in their home country as of 1 January 1996 are in the public domain in the United States.

American Fair Use entitles the use of copyrighted material in articles directly about the copyrighted material, for such uses as parody or critique. A question has arisen as to what the status of copyright law is for material which is loaded onto an American site, from Australia, whether it falls under Australian or American copyright law. It has been regarded that images in the public domain in Australia are not necessarily so in the U.S. An image being in the public domain in Australia may not necessarily imply that it is in the public domain in the U.S.

== See also ==
- Copyright law of Australia
- Berne Convention
- History of fair use proposals in Australia
