= News Media Bargaining Code =

Australian law

Treasury Laws Amendment (News Media and Digital Platforms Mandatory Bargaining Code) Act 2021

Parliament of Australia
- Long title: A Bill for an Act to amend the Competition and Consumer Act 2010 in relation to digital platforms, and for related purposes
- Citation: Treasury Laws Amendment (News Media and Digital Platforms Mandatory Bargaining Code) Act 2021 (Cth) No. 21, 2021
- Territorial extent: Australia
- Passed by: Australian House of Representatives
- Passed: 17 February 2021
- Enacted: 25 February 2021 (with amendments from the Senate)
- Passed by: Australian Senate
- Passed: 24 February 2021
- Assented to by: Governor-General David Hurley
- Assented to: 2 March 2021
- Commenced: 3 March 2021

Legislative history

Initiating chamber: Australian House of Representatives
- Bill title: Treasury Laws Amendment (News Media and Digital Platforms Mandatory Bargaining Code) Bill 2020
- Bill citation: Treasury Laws Amendment (News Media and Digital Platforms Mandatory Bargaining Code) Bill 2021 (Cth)
- Introduced by: Josh Frydenberg
- First reading: 9 December 2020
- Second reading: 17 February 2021
- Third reading: 17 February 2021

Revising chamber: Australian Senate
- Bill title: Treasury Laws Amendment (News Media and Digital Platforms Mandatory Bargaining Code) Bill 2021
- Member(s) in charge: Zed Seselja
- First reading: 22 February 2021
- Second reading: 23 February 2021
- Third reading: 24 February 2021

Amends
- Competition and Consumer Act 2010

Summary
- Establish a mandatory code of conduct that applies to news media businesses and digital platform corporations when bargaining in relation to news content made available by digital platform services.
- Status: Current legislation

The News Media Bargaining Code (NMBC, or News Media and Digital Platforms Mandatory Bargaining Code) is a law designed to have large technology platforms that operate in Australia pay local news publishers for the news content made available or linked on their platforms. The law's definition of news is broad, including "content that reports, investigates or explains ... current issues or events of public significance for Australians at a local, regional or national level." Originating in April 2020, when the Australian Government asked the Australian Competition & Consumer Commission (ACCC) to begin drafting it, it achieved broad support in the Australian Parliament but staunch opposition from Facebook and Google.

Due to Australia taking the lead pushing for sustainability of the news industry, the News Media Bargaining Code greatly influenced the legislation in other countries.

Under the law, there are two ways for the eligible news organisations (the ones registered with the Australian Communications and Media Authority (the ACMA) to extract fees from the platforms:

- the news providers can directly negotiate agreements with the platforms;
- if negotiations are unsuccessful, the Treasurer of Australia can "designate" the platform, imposing mandatory fees.

As of November 2024, no platforms were designated and no designations were pending.

== Purpose ==
The Act seeks to "address a bargaining power imbalance that exists between digital platforms and Australian news businesses" which the ACCC identified in its Digital Platforms Inquiry report. The Australian government hopes it "will ensure that news media businesses are fairly remunerated for the content they generate, helping to sustain public interest journalism in Australia".

It requires stakeholders to agree to a dollar value of the news content distributed by the platforms, pay that revenue to registered news publishers, and agree to final offer arbitration in the case of a dispute between a publisher and a platform on the value of the news content. The Bill defined making "content available" by "if the content is reproduced on the service, or is otherwise placed on the service, or if a link to the content or an extract of the content is provided on the service." Nine Network estimated this amount to be $432 million. The code would also require digital platforms give 28 days notice to Australian news publishers about algorithm changes that could affect links to their news content.

Proponents of the law argue that the profitability of social media companies is partly attributable to the fact that users can receive news updates even when they do not view the ads on the page of the original publisher.

== Reception ==
The code was supported by media companies based outside Australia The Guardian, the Daily Mail, and News Corp. The bill was also supported by the Australian Press Council. The Bill also saw support from public broadcasters, the Australian Broadcasting Corporation and the Special Broadcasting Service, following their amended inclusion in the remuneration stages of the code. The bill also saw support from Microsoft, which issued a statement suggesting that the code would be made to work with its search engine Bing. This followed a comment from Google Australia which said the company would pull out of the Australian market if the code was enacted.

Smaller journalistic entities including The New Daily, Crikey and Country Press Australia argued that the code favours dominant media companies at the expense of smaller publishers.

The policy director of the Australian Taxpayers' Alliance called the measure protectionism. Other notable technologists including World Wide Web inventor Tim Berners-Lee, journalism professor Jeff Jarvis, New York Times technology journalist Kara Swisher and Stratechery writer Ben Thompson criticised the code for being technically unworkable. Former Australian Prime Minister Kevin Rudd, who is a prominent activist against News Corp, argued that the code was designed to favour the company's properties. Crikey political editor Bernard Keane criticised Australian mainstream media for allegedly "systematically misleading [their] audiences" over the code and the legislation.

While originally unified in their rejection of NMBC and issuance of threats to remove Australian News from their platforms, Google and Meta ended up with different approaches to the problem. This reflects difference in their positioning with respect to the news: Meta's interest in dissemination of the news had diminished since the late 2010s to the point where the news tabs in Facebook were removed for some countries, while Google has kept interest in the Google News.

=== Google ===
Google was funding the news sector through its Google News Initiative to the tune of approximately $600 million since 2018, with $1 billion allocated for Google News Showcase, to be paid to selected new outlets. While these payment numbers are global, some monetary contributions were made to Australian news providers before NMBC. Google, however, mostly relied on in-kind support, like free GSuite licenses and training via the Google News Academy.

Google originally criticised the idea of NMBC as unfeasible, especially the restrictions on when they can change the algorithms for how various sources are ranked.

Due to the confidentiality of the agreements, it is hard to estimate the post-NMBC amounts, although rumors have it that Google is paying more than Meta, provides discounts on its technology and additional revenue-sharing income streams. Google moved fast, signing more deals for a higher total amount than Meta, but tried to structure the contracts to encourage the production of content for the News Showcase, prioritising the podcasts. For the smaller media outlets, Google was able to dictate what kind of content is expected, even though the NMBC was not intended as a means for the platforms paying for content specifically generated for them. This appears to be a result of Google trying to use the (voluntary) "significant contribution" clauses of NMBC in order to avoid the "mandatory designation" option.

=== Meta ===
Meta's approach pre-NMBC was mostly of a philanthropic nature, with millions of dollars flowing to regional news providers and public interest news. In-kind support was also provided, for example, through engagement with the Walkley Foundation (Google also was involved).

Since the percentage of the news content on Canadian Facebook is quite low (less than 1% of posts contain URL of Australian news sites), late in 2024, as Meta was avoiding entering new contracts with Australian media, Bruns et al. predicted that Meta would enact a permanent ban on Australian news following the approach it took in Canada (in August 2023, after the Canada's Online News Act) to avoid getting entangled with NMBC. The concern about Meta withdrawing its news coverage contributed to the absence of any designations as of November 2024.

== History ==
In December 2017, the Turnbull government directed the ACCC to conduct an inquiry into "competition in media and advertising services markets", focusing in large part on Google and Facebook. The final report published in July 2019 made several conclusions regarding the state of competition in the news and media landscape:

[We're seeing] reduced production of particular types of news and journalism, including local government and local court reporting, which are important for the healthy functioning of the democratic process. There is not yet any indication of a business model that can effectively replace the advertiser model, which has historically funded the production of these types of journalism in Australia.

In April 2020, the Morrison government directed the ACCC to develop a mandatory code "to address bargaining power imbalances between digital platforms and media companies". The draft News Media Bargaining Code was published by the ACCC in July 2020, and interested parties were invited to make submissions regarding the proposed code.

In August 2020, Google users in Australia were directed to an open letter protesting the law, which the ACCC characterised as misleading. The letter stated that Google already complies with existing reimbursement programs that are less broad. While in submission phase in Parliament, Google Australia director Mel Silva said the bill was "untenable" and that the company would discontinue access to its search engine within Australia if the code was enacted without changes.

On 28 August 2020, the ACCC closed the consultation period on the proposal. The code was converted to a bill and sent to Parliament in December 2020.

The bill caused digital platforms to negotiate payments to local news publishers. By February 2021, Google established deals in anticipation of the code's enactment and negotiated lump sum deals with Seven West Media, Nine Entertainment, and News Corp to provide content for the company's new "News Showcase" feature. These deals would mean Google can avoid entering the arbitration stages of the code.

=== Facebook blocks news ===
In August 2020 Facebook stated that the proposed legislation left them "with a choice of either removing news entirely or accepting a system that lets publishers charge us for as much content as they want at a price with no clear limits". Facebook warned that if the "draft code becomes law, we will reluctantly stop allowing publishers and people in Australia from sharing local and international news on Facebook and Instagram". Following the Senate committee endorsing the legislation without pushing for any amendments, on 17 February 2021 Facebook claimed "the proposed law fundamentally misunderstands the relationship between our platform and publishers who use it to share news content" and blocked all Australian news from being shared by anyone on their platform and blocked all news from being seen or shared by users in Australia. Facebook also blocked pages of some government, community, union, charity, political, and emergency services, which were later reinstated. The company said this was a result of the bill having a broad definition of news content. For example, as the main provider of weather forecasts, warnings and observations to the Australian public, the Bureau of Meteorology by definition "reports, investigates or explains ... current issues or events of public significance for Australians at a local, regional or national level", and was one of the services initially affected.

In a Facebook post, Australian Prime Minister Scott Morrison said that "Facebook's actions to unfriend Australia, cutting off essential information services on health and emergency services, were as arrogant as they were disappointing." The move by the company saw widespread condemnation by Australian political leaders, and a mixed reaction from Australian residents and experts. The Australian government strongly criticised the move, saying it demonstrated the "immense market power of these digital social giants". The federal government announced it is stopping all its advertising campaigns on Facebook, worth millions of dollars. Days after Facebook's response to the bill and experts predicting that misinformation on Facebook will spread more rapidly, with a spokesperson for Nine Entertainment saying "Facebook will now be a platform for misinformation to rapidly spread without balance". In late February, technology companies including Facebook and Google released the final version of an industry code to address the spread of misinformation on their services in Australia.

On 22 February 2021, Facebook said it reached an agreement with the Australian government that would see news returning to Australian users in the coming days.

=== News Bargaining Incentive ===
On 12 December 2024, the Albanese government announced the introduction of the News Bargaining Incentive scheme whereby technology platforms with annual revenues of AU$270 million or higher would be required to either pay the federal government a fixed charge which would then be distributed to news publishers, or enter into direct deals with news publishers and offset the fixed charge. All technology platforms meeting the revenue criterion would be affected by the scheme regardless of whether they display news content or not. The scheme intends to provide a financial incentive for platforms to negotiate deals with media publishers and subsequently avoid a government fee, increasing the bargaining power of news publishers. The design of the scheme is yet to be finalised but it will apply to sites such as Facebook, Google and TikTok. It was introduced after the announcement from Meta Platforms in March 2024 that the company would not renew any contracts it had with Australian media publishers.

Meta noted that it agrees with the government on the NMBC being flawed, yet sees any attempt of "charging one industry to subsidise another" as problematic.

In the first half of 2025, the government of Australia was going slowly with regard to NMBC, probably fearing a potential retaliation from Donald Trump.

== Results ==
The evaluation of the NMBC implementation is hampered by its "murky" nature, "with critical details guarded like they're nuclear launch codes". Still, by 2023 it was considered a success by the journalism researchers and the Australian government. Media outlets had expanded their newsrooms following the agreement on funding deals.

More than 30 deals have been reached after the first year of operation, with the number of media companies much higher: NMBC allows collective bargaining for the companies with revenues below 10 million Australian dollars; one of the agreements involved 84 smaller companies, another 24. The total value of the deals was 200 million Australian dollars. Notable failures include the inability of the Special Broadcasting Service and The Conversation to reach an agreement with Facebook. The Australian Department of Treasury was considering extending the NMBC to Instagram and TikTok (YouTube is sharing its revenues already).

In March 2024, Meta stopped renewing the Facebook contracts related to News Media Bargaining Code, resulting in calls for Facebook to be designated under the Act. Axel Bruns expects the Australian government at some point to "designate" Meta, leading to Meta going for a permanent ban on Australian news content on its sites (so it can plausibly argue in court that it no longer is subject to NMBC). In turn, the government might pass the "must-carry" legislation that would force Meta to carry news content.

In May 2025, Google also refused to renew multiple contracts with Australian news publishers.

== Influence on international legislation ==
Following the introduction of the News Media Bargaining Code in Australia, several other governments explored or passed similar reforms.

=== Canada ===
Canada enacted the Online News Act in 2023, modelling its approach on the Australian code by requiring platforms to negotiate payment agreements with news publishers. The legislation included several refinements, notably a more structured designation process and requirements that platforms fund a range of media voices, including Indigenous communities, minority-language outlets, and smaller independent publishers. In response, Meta withdrew all news content from its platforms in Canada in October 2023, a ban that remained in place in the late 2025. Google, after initially threatening a similar news blackout, negotiated a $100 million CAD payment to the Canadian Radio-television and Telecommunications Commission in exchange for being exempt from the Act's requirements. This was much lower than the amount expected by the proponents of the Act ($170–300 million CAD).

=== New Zealand ===
New Zealand began exploring a bargaining code shortly after Australia's apparent early success in 2021. Google pre-empted regulatory action by launching its News Showcase product there in 2022, offering funding to selected outlets on its own terms. When the government revived the proposal in July 2024, Google again warned it might stop linking to New Zealand news content.

=== United States ===
California pursued a bill that, while not identical to the Australian code, relied on comparable competition law logic: it would have enabled news organisations to collectively negotiate with platforms and seek arbitration if talks failed. Google headed off the measure by committing US$250 million in funding to Californian newsrooms.

== See also ==
- Copyright aspects of hyperlinking and framing
- Disruptive innovation
- History of fair use proposals in Australia
- Internet neutrality
- Mass media in Australia
- Online News Act, similar legislation in Canada
