= Australian Competition and Consumer Commission =

Competition regulation agency of the Australian Government

Commission overview
- Formed: 1995
- Preceding agencies: Australian Trade Practices Commission; Prices Surveillance Authority
- Jurisdiction: Australia
- Headquarters: 23 Marcus Clarke Street, Canberra
- Employees: 1,486 (2022–23)
- Annual budget: $569.7 million (2024–25)
- Minister responsible: Jim Chalmers, Treasurer
- Commission executives: Gina Cass-Gottlieb, Chair; Delia Rickard, Deputy Chair; Mick Keogh, Deputy Chair; Stephen Ridgeway, Commissioner; Anna Brakey, Commissioner; Peter Crone, Commissioner; Liza Carver, Commissioner
- Parent department: Treasury
- Child agencies: Australian Energy Regulator; National Anti-Scam Centre
- Key document: Competition and Consumer Act 2010
- Website: accc.gov.au

The Australian Competition and Consumer Commission (ACCC) is the chief competition regulator of the Government of Australia, located within the Department of the Treasury. It was established in 1995 with the amalgamation of the Australian Trade Practices Commission and the Prices Surveillance Authority to administer the Trade Practices Act 1974, which was replaced by the Competition and Consumer Act 2010 on 1 January 2011. The ACCC's mandate is to protect consumer rights, business rights and obligations, to perform industry regulation and price monitoring, and to prevent illegal anti-competitive behaviour.

== Historical origins ==
The ACCC's deeper origins are found in the Restrictive Trade Practices Act 1965 of Sir Garfield Barwick, Attorney-General in the Liberal government of Sir Robert Menzies in 1965.

Though recognised as a failure, Barwick's legislation established in Australian law "the principle of legislative coverage of trade practices". The area badly needed reform. Lionel Murphy, the Attorney-General in the Whitlam Labor government, solicited the advice of the economist and business commentator, Professor Ted Wheelwright. In April 1973, Wheelwright produced a report for Murphy which became the blueprint of new legislation. He recommended, among other things, that the Act be clearly focused on protecting the consumer.

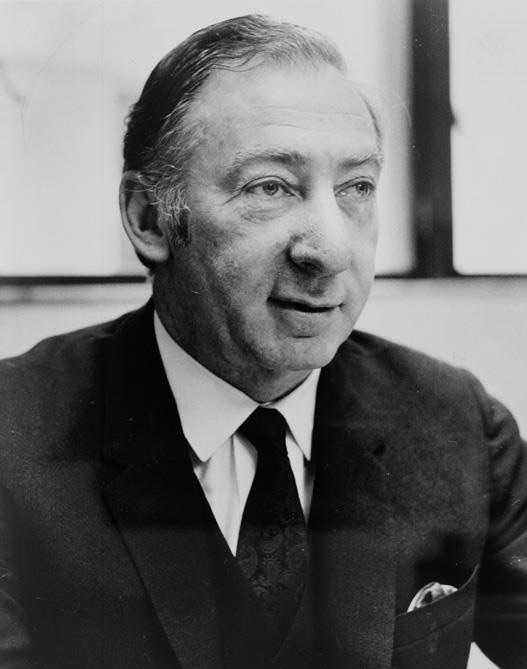
Senator, Attorney-General and High Court Justice Lionel Murphy

Murphy is acknowledged as having completely changed the previous approach regarding trade practices in Australia. For the first time in Australian federal law, his Trade Practices Bill, which was passed on 6 August 1974, introduced offences related to monopolisation, exclusive dealing, price discrimination, resale price maintenance, restraints of trade by agreement, anti-competitive mergers, misleading advertising, coercive sales conduct, pyramid selling, and the sale of unsolicited goods.

Though the Act included substantial penalties, Murphy's initiative received very little opposition in the Parliament or the business community.

== Roles ==
The ACCC administers the Competition and Consumer Act, and has standing to take action in the Federal Court of Australia to enforce its provision. The Competition and Consumer Act contains a broad range of provisions, such as provisions on anti-competitive conduct, the Australian Consumer Law and regulation of telecommunications and energy industries. The ACCC, under the Act, also regulates certain industries by providing access to national infrastructure. The ACCC also has an educative role and seeks to educate both consumers and businesses as to their rights and responsibilities under the Act.

The Australian Energy Regulator is a constituent but separate part of the ACCC and is responsible for economic energy regulation. It shares staff and premises with the ACCC, but has a separate board, although at least one board member must also be a Commissioner at the ACCC.

== Restrictive trade practices ==
In most cases the spirit of the Act, and thus the actions of the ACCC, favours neither consumer nor supplier, but strives to achieve a competitive market without artificial restrictions. For example, refusal to deal – a producer refusing to supply a potential retailer or customer with a product – is not itself illegal unless the action would have an anti-competitive effect on the market as a whole.

== Penalties ==
The ACCC brings court action against companies that breach the Competition and Consumer Act 2010, which can result in the application of fines and other penalties.

The maximum fine for a corporation is calculated as the larger of: $50,000,000; or three times the value of the illegal benefit; or (if the value of the benefit cannot be ascertained) 30% of turnover for the preceding 12 months. Individuals may be fined up to $2,500,000 under the Competition and Consumer Act for offences such as price fixing or participation in a cartel.

The ACCC also has power to accept, on its own behalf, court enforceable undertakings under section 87B of the Competition and Consumer Act. Such undertakings may include a wide range of remedies to the conduct.

A range of other remedies can be ordered by the court. For example, companies are frequently forced to publish retractions of false advertising claims in national newspapers and at their places of business. Companies found in breach of the CCA are usually bound to implement a compliance program to ensure future compliance with the Act.

== Consumer confidence ==
In regard to its role of safeguarding consumer rights, there has been occasional criticism of the ACCC for being "all-talk-no-action". This criticism is most likely due to the inherent difficulty in obtaining sufficient evidence to prove breaches of the restrictive trade practices provisions of the Competition and Consumer Act.

The ACCC has exercised its authority in a number of retail areas, including fining retailer Target for false advertising and Woolworths (including some Safeway-branded supermarkets in Victoria) for anti-competitive liquor deals.

In 2008, the ACCC published findings of its inquiry into the competitiveness of retail prices for groceries in Australia. The report found that the Australian supermarket sector is "workably competitive", but price competition is limited by barriers to entry and a lack of incentive for the two major players, Coles and Woolworths, to compete on price. The report also noted that Coles and Woolworths engage in deliberate strategies designed to ensure they maintain exclusive access to prime sites such as shopping centres to prevent centre managers leasing space to competing supermarkets.

In September 2009, the ACCC reached agreement with Coles and Woolworths to phase out restrictive lease agreements. The ACCC has enforced the law against producers of quack devices with medical claims like Power Balance. It won a case on 24 March 2016 against Valve for failing to provide refunds for faulty products, and making representations that domestic consumer guarantees did not apply to purchases using the Steam client.

In August 2023 the ACCC commenced proceedings in the Federal Court against Qantas, alleging that the airline had continued to advertise and sell tickets for thousands of flights after deciding to cancel them and had not promptly notified existing ticketholders. Qantas admitted contravening the Australian Consumer Law in May 2024 and gave the ACCC a court-enforceable undertaking to pay about $20 million to the 86,597 consumers who had booked, or been re-accommodated onto, flights it had already decided to cancel, and to change its cancellation processes. A further 883,977 consumers held bookings that continued to display flights Qantas had decided to cancel. On 8 October 2024 the Court declared that Qantas had made false or misleading representations between 21 May 2021 and 26 August 2023 and, on joint submissions by the parties, ordered it to pay a pecuniary penalty of $100 million. ACCC chair Gina Cass-Gottlieb described this as "a substantial penalty, which sets a strong signal to all businesses, big or small", while Justice Rofe observed that although Qantas's behaviour had been "intolerable", the contraventions were "not at the highest level" within the spectrum of offending, and had regard to the airline's cooperation and to the changes it had made to its systems.

== Product safety and recalls ==
The ACCC maintains a website listing all Australian product recalls. The following organisations are commissioned to assist with the surveillance and monitoring of product safety in relevant areas:

- Food products – Food Standards Australia New Zealand
- Motor vehicles – Department of Infrastructure, Transport, Regional Development, Communications, Sport and the Arts
- Therapeutic goods – Therapeutic Goods Administration
- Agricultural and veterinary products – Australian Pesticides and Veterinary Medicines Authority
- Electrical goods – Australian Electrical Equipment Safety Regulators
- Gas and appliance – Gas Technical Regulators Committee Australia New Zealand

The ACCC, in conjunction with state and territory offices of fair trading, is responsible for developing and enforcing mandatory consumer product safety standards except where the product falls into the jurisdiction of one of the specialist regulators mentioned above

== News Media Bargaining Code ==
The News Media Bargaining Code (NMBC, or News Media and Digital Platforms Mandatory Bargaining Code) is a law designed to have large technology platforms that operate in Australia pay local news publishers for the news content made available or linked on their platforms. The law's definition of news is broad, including "content that reports, investigates or explains ... current issues or events of public significance for Australians at a local, regional or national level." Originating in April 2020, when the Australian Government asked the Australian Competition & Consumer Commission (ACCC) to begin drafting it, it achieved broad support in the Australian Parliament but staunch opposition from Facebook and Google.

- the news providers can directly negotiate agreements with the platforms;
- if negotiations are unsuccessful, the Treasurer of Australia can "designate" the platform, imposing mandatory fees.

== See also ==
- Economy of Australia
- Australian Consumers' Association
- List of Australian Commonwealth Government entities
- Two-price advertising § Australia

General:

- Competition law
- Competition policy
- Competition regulator
- Consumer protection
