= Two-price advertising =

Form of deceptive advertising

Two-price advertising is the sales and marketing practice of showing customers two prices, a supposed normal price and a lower price, which is claimed to be a special offer or discount, but in fact, the stated normal price is a fiction.

The idea of two-price advertising is to present an apparent saving, usually very substantial, as a way to attract customers. The term two-price advertising refers only to those cases where the "normal" price claimed is designed to deceive.

Regulatory treatment of the practice varies around the world. A clear deception, it is likely to come under false advertising or fair trading laws. The practice normally takes place only in retail marketing. Certain industries tend to be more prone to it than others.

== Australia ==
In Australia, two-price advertising comes under the Competition and Consumer Act 2010 as misleading conduct. The Australian Competition & Consumer Commission (ACCC) is responsible for enforcing that act and cooperates with the various state-government departments of fair trading or consumer protection which also investigate such matters. For example, ahead of Mother's Day, in 2006, the ACCC and state authorities issued joint warnings about jewelry prices shown in catalogues. Jewelry and carpet rugs seem to be industries frequently associated with two-price advertising.

In 2002, the now-defunct retail chain Allans Music was prosecuted by the ACCC over a catalogue that it issued in 2000, showing musical instruments at prices heavily discounted from stated normal prices. They pleaded guilty to 9 of the 18 counts and were fined $80,000. The court was satisfied the "was" prices shown were not prices that had been offered prior to the sale.

One point the case illustrated was that a disclaimer in a catalogue may not be a defence. Allans had fine print saying the savings were off recommended retail prices (RRPs) but that was only suppliers' recommendations. Allans chose not to rely on it as a defence or as mitigation on legal advice. Justice Tamberlin described that fine print as "obscure and totally inadequate". In fact, the disclaimer worked against the company, as it indicated to the judge that Allans knew that their claims needed an explanation, and so were not an accident.
