= Right to quote =

Copyright exception under the Berne Convention

Right to quote or right of quotation or quotation right is one of the copyright exceptions provided by the Berne Convention, article 10: "It shall be permissible to make quotations ... provided that their making is compatible with fair practice, and their extent does not exceed that justified by the purpose." With different language, it was already present in the 1908 revision of the treaty.

== Implementation ==
National legislations usually embody the Berne Convention limits in one or more of the following requirements:

- the cited paragraphs are within a reasonable limit (varying from country to country),
- clearly marked as quotations and fully referenced,
- the resulting new work is not just a collection of quotations, but constitutes a fully original work in itself.

In some countries the intended use of the work (educational, scientific, parodist, etc.) may also be a factor determining the scope of this right.

== Europe ==
The right to quote is especially important in continental Europe copyright law, where it covers some of the practices known elsewhere as fair dealing. European jurisprudence is gradually extending the number of uses permitted under the right to quote, with some limits.

=== France ===
In France, it is illegal to reproduce someone's work without their approval. But if the work is published, i.e. no longer being edited prior to release, small quotations are legal.

=== Germany ===
In Germany, the right to quote is extended considerably for research purposes and may even encompass complete works (e. g. texts, pictures, music or videos).

=== Poland ===
In Poland, the right to quote allows quotation of excerpts of works and small works as a whole, provided that this is justified by teaching, review, explanation or caricatural motivation. Such use can be also justified by polemic or critical analysis of the work. In order for the use to be lawful, the user has to mention the name and surname of the author and the source. Additionally, such use cannot interfere with the legitimate interests of the author and exceed the normal exploitation of the work being quoted. However, typically, the author of the work is not entitled to remuneration for quotation.

== See also ==
- Fair dealing
- Fair use
- Quotation
