= Berne three-step test =

International legal principle regarding intellectual property

In international law, the Berne three-step test is a clause that is included in several international treaties on intellectual property. Signatories of those treaties agree to standardize possible limitations and exceptions to exclusive rights under their respective national copyright laws.

== Berne Convention ==
The three-step test was first established in relation to the exclusive right of reproduction under Article 9(2) of the Berne Convention for the Protection of Literary and Artistic Works in 1967. Article 9 of the Berne Convention states that:

Right of Reproduction: 1. Generally; 2. Possible exceptions; 3. Sound and visual recordings - (1) Authors of literary and artistic works protected by this Convention shall have the exclusive right of authorizing the reproduction of these works, in any manner or form. (2) It shall be a matter for legislation in the countries of the Union to permit the reproduction of such works in certain special cases, provided that such reproduction does not conflict with a normal exploitation of the work and does not unreasonably prejudice the legitimate interests of the author. (3) Any sound or visual recording shall be considered as a reproduction for the purposes of this Convention.

The test is vague; But, spelled out in the formulation of Hugenholtz and Okediji, the three steps are:

1. Limitations and exceptions cannot be "overly broad" [= "certain special cases"]
2. Limitations and exceptions cannot "rob right holders of a real or potential source of income that is substantive" [= "conflicting with normal exploitation of the work"]
3. Limitations and exceptions cannot "do disproportional harm to the rights holders" [= "prejudice legitimate interests"]

The three-step test in Article 9(2) of the Berne does not apply to copyright exceptions that are implemented under other parts of the Berne convention that have a separate standard, such as those in articles 2(4), 2(7), 2(8), 2 bis, 10, 10 bis and 13(1), or the Berne Appendix.

=== Other copyright treaties ===
The three-step test has been modified and transplanted into the Agreement on Trade-Related Aspects of Intellectual Property Rights, the WIPO Copyright Treaty (Article 10), the WIPO Performances and Phonograms Treaty (Article 16(2)), the EU Computer Programs Directive (Article 6(3)), the EU Database Directive (Article 6(3)), and the EU Copyright Directive (Article 5(5)).

The test as included in Article 13 of TRIPs reads:

"Members shall confine limitations and exceptions to exclusive rights to certain special cases which do not conflict with a normal exploitation of the work and do not unreasonably prejudice the legitimate interests of the rights holder."

The WTO three-step test does not apply to cases where the Berne or Rome Conventions provide separate standards for exceptions, or for rights not covered in the TRIPS Agreement.

== Interpretation ==
The technical legal reasoning which has been applied to suggest how this wording should be interpreted is arcane (see the references below). To date, only one legal case (before a WTO dispute settlement panel, involving U.S. copyright exemptions allowing restaurants, bars and shops to play radio and TV broadcasts without paying licensing fees, passed in 1998 as a rider to the Sonny Bono Copyright Term Extension Act) has actually required an interpretation of the test.

The three-step test may prove to be extremely important if any nations attempt to reduce the scope of copyright law, because unless the WTO decides that their modifications comply with the test, such states are likely to face trade sanctions. Exceptions to copyright protection are required to be clearly defined and narrow in scope and reach. For instance, the three-step test was invoked as a justification for refusing certain exceptions to copyright wished for by members of the French parliament during the examination of the controversial DADVSI copyright bill.

== Patents ==
TRIPs Article 30, covering limitations and exemptions to patent law, is also derived from a somewhat different three-step test, that includes "taking account of the legitimate interests of third parties." Exceptions to exclusive patent rights are not subject to this test if they are implemented through Article 31 of the TRIPS, or Articles 6, 40 or 44.2.

== See also ==
- Fair use
- Fair dealing
