= History of fair use proposals in Australia =

The history of fair-use proposals in Australia is a series of Australian government enquiries into the introduction of a "flexible and open" fair use system into Australian copyright law. Between 1998 and 2016, eight enquiries examined, and in most cases recommended, the introduction of fair use in place of the current "fair dealing" system which allows copyrighted material to be used only if it meets one of four specific purposes as set out in the Act.

A change to a fair-use system would allow copyright material to be used without the copyright owner's consent in any circumstances where the use is fair, as judged against four "fairness factors". A re-user need only address the four fairness factors proposed by the Australian Law Reform Commission and Productivity Commission, which are:

- The purpose and character of the use;
- The nature of the copyright material;
- The amount and substantiality of the part used; and
- The effect of the use on the potential market for, or value of, the copyright material.

Proponents of the proposed fair-use system describe it as a system which would "...maximise the net benefit to the community", reinforce that "user interests should also be recognised by Australia’s copyright system", and that without it, "...the Australian copyright system will always have gaps, always be trying to catch up with new technologies and behaviours." They further argue that fair dealing is "too limited and prescriptive in nature". Similar fair use systems are also used in countries including Israel, Singapore, South Korea, and Poland.

Opponents of the proposed fair-use system say that it would introduce "significant and unnecessary uncertainty into Australian law” and that it is "an American legal principle that has enabled large enterprises in the US to use copyright material for free". The Motion Picture Association of America considers its potential introduction of in Australia to be a notable "foreign trade barrier" despite proactively supporting the existence of the fair use doctrine in the USA through legal action as "...our members rely on the fair use doctrine every day when producing their movies and television shows".

The copyright exception system – either fair use or fair dealing – is unrelated to parallel import restrictions, or the duration of the copyright term, although the three are often conflated in public debates.

== Current approach – "fair dealing" ==
Currently (2017) Australia has a purpose-based approach to exceptions, called "fair dealing". The system contains an explicit list of "technical bespoke copyright exceptions" which means the use of copyrighted material without the specific consent of the copyright-holder is only allowed if the proposed use is one of a number of specific purposes listed in the Australian Copyright Act. The primary purpose-based exceptions are the fair dealing exceptions for:

- parody or satire
- study or research
- criticism or review
- reporting the news.

A number of specific exceptions cover uses such as:

- interoperability of computer programs
- disability access.

Other than in Australia, in 2017 "Fair Dealing" is used in countries including the UK, New Zealand and Canada.

== Government inquiries ==
From 1998 to 2017 there have been eight Australian government inquiries which have considered the question of whether fair use should be adopted in Australia. Six reviews have recommended Australia adopt a "fair use" model of copyright exceptions: two inquiries specifically into the Copyright Act (1998, 2014); and four broader reviews (both 2004, 2013, 2016). One review (2000) recommended against the introduction of fair use and another (2005) issued no final report.

"Copy(NOT)right" infographic, produced by the Productivity Commission in support of its 2016 recommendation for the introduction of fair use

Summary of Australian government reports that considered fair use
Year	Organisation	Publication	Reference
1998	Copyright Law Review Committee	Simplification of the Copyright Act Part 1: Exceptions to the Exclusive Rights of Copyright Owners	§6.10
2000	Intellectual Property and Competition Review Committee	Review of Intellectual Property Legislation under the Competition Principles Agreement	p15
2004	Joint Standing Committee on Treaties (JSCOT)	The Australia – United States Free Trade Agreement Chapter 16: Intellectual Property Rights and Electronic Commerce	§16.50
2004	Senate Select Committee on the Free Trade Agreement between Australia and the United States of America	Final Report on the Free Trade Agreement between Australia and the United States of America. Chapter 3: Intellectual Property	§3.117
2005	Australian Government Attorney-General's Department	fair use and Other Copyright Exceptions: An Examination of Fair Use, Fair Dealing and Other Exceptions in the Digital Age, Issues Paper	no report
2013	House of Representatives Standing Committee on Infrastructure and Communications	At what cost? IT pricing and the Australia Tax Chapter 4: Copyright, circumvention, competition, and remedies	Ch4. p111
2014	Australian Law Reform Commission (ALRC)	Copyright and the Digital Economy Chapter 4: The case for fair use	Ch4.
2016	Productivity Commission (PC)	Intellectual Property Arrangements Chapter 6: Fair use or fair dealing – what is fair for Australia?	Ch6.

=== AUSFTA ===
Both reports from 2004 were in response to the signing of the Australia–United States Free Trade Agreement (AUSFTA). The AUSFTA's Intellectual Property chapter purported to align Australian copyright law with that of the United States. In doing so, it introduced a number of measures that extended the rights of copyright holders, or as some described them: "the harsher measures of the Digital Millennium Copyright Act 1998 (US) and the Sonny Bono Copyright Extension Act 1998 (US)". However, Australia did not simultaneously adopt "balancing" features of the United States law which provided rights to copyright users, "such as the higher standard of originality or the open-ended fair use defence of United States law". leaving some media reports to wonder "Why did we gain the restrictions of US copyright law but not the rights?"

In response, the two Parliamentary committees tasked with reviewing the AUSFTA implementation recommended that Australia should introduce fair use, "to counter the effects of the extension of copyright protection". They noted that "the application of a broad, open-ended 'fair use' doctrine, similar to that in the United States, may ... assist in legitimising several commonplace actions undertaken regularly by Australians perhaps unaware that they are infringing copyright." Although the Committees' recommendations on fair use were not adopted, new exceptions were introduced in the Copyright Amendment Act 2006 to cover some of these "commonplace actions" such as time shifting, format shifting, and a new fair dealing for "parody and satire". In introducing the bill to Parliament, the Attorney-General Philip Ruddock stated that "This will provide some of the benefits that the fair use doctrine provides in the United States under their law."

While noting that "Nothing in the AUSFTA would prevent Australia from implementing legislation to raise the level of originality and to introduce a 'fair use' defence to copyright infringement", the committee understood that IP collecting societies (including Viscopy, CAL, and ARIA) "oppose any move to adopt a 'fair use' defence" on the basis that the introduction of a foreign legal concept would "have many additional implications for Australian law", was "an unjustified abrogation of the rights of copyright owners" and would "significantly increase enforcement difficulties".

=== ALRC ===
"Creationistas – Australian Copyright Is Broken" promotional video, produced by the Australian Digital Alliance in support of the ALRC report

In 2012 the Attorney-General of Australia, Hon. Nicola Roxon referred "the matter of whether the exceptions and statutory licences in the Copyright Act 1968, are adequate and appropriate in the digital environment" to the Australian Law Reform Commission (ALRC) for investigation. After an 18-month review, it recommended the introduction of fair use as it "would streamline our current hotch-potch copyright laws, which aren't designed to cope with the rapid pace of technological change." Alongside the broad fair use exception, the ALRC proposed the inclusion of a "non-exhaustive list of illustrative uses or purposes that may qualify as fair use" arging that this, and that the fact that fair use has been in operation in the USA – the world's largest cultural-exporter – for 35 years, would alleviate concerns that Fair use would introduce too much uncertainty for copyright hoders. The Australian University sector, in particular, expressed its support for this proposal.

[Fair use] facilitates the public interest in accessing material, encouraging new productive uses, and stimulating competition and innovation. Fair use can be applied to a greater range of new technologies and uses than Australia’s existing exceptions. A technology-neutral open standard such as fair use has the agility to respond to future and unanticipated technologies and business and consumer practices. With fair use, businesses and consumers will develop an understanding of what sort of uses are fair and therefore permissible, and will not need to wait for the legislature to determine the appropriate scope of copyright exceptions.

— Copyright and the Digital Economy, Australian Law Reform Commission

Separate but parallel to the review by the ALRC, in 2013 Greens Senator Scott Ludlam introduced a "catch-all" fair use bill to parliament. As it was not a government bill, and did not proceed to a vote, it lapsed in November of that year on the day of the installation of the new parliament following the 2013 federal election. Consumer affairs organisation Choice also ran a campaign in support of the ALRC recommendations.

=== Productivity Commission ===
The 2016 Productivity Commission Report

In 2015, the Productivity Commission (PC) was tasked by the then Treasurer, Joe Hockey, with investigating whether the "current [Australian Intellectual Property] arrangements provide an appropriate balance between access to ideas and products, and encouraging innovation, investment and the production of creative works". Its conclusions, published in December 2016, "reignited the copyright wars" in Australia by recommending, among other things, the introduction of fair use and the removal of parallel import restrictions (PIRs), also referred to as "territorial copyright", on books. A formal response from the government to the report is expected in mid-2017.

In the public debate, the PC's fair use recommendation has been conflated with a number of other aspects of the report. These include the parallel importation recommendation and references to the potential benefits of a significantly shorter copyright term of "15–25 years". Although the PC did not actually recommend such a reduction in either its draft or final reports, and acknowledged that it was not possible under Australia's international obligations, a number of celebrated Australian authors, including Jackie French and Anna Funder, argued publicly against a reduction in the duration of copyright in Australia. Tom Keneally, speaking at the Australian book industry awards in May 2016, stated "The federal government proposes to do something neither the Brits nor Americans propose to do [to] their writers: to slice Australian authors’ copyright to 15–25 years after publication." This prompted the relevant Minister, Mitch Fifield, to reject these claims stating that a reduction of the copyright term "is not something the Government has considered, proposed or intends to do", and moreover that due to its involvement in a range of free trade agreements, Australia "...has no unilateral capacity to alter copyright terms."

The PC's fair use recommendation has, however, also been strongly objected to in its own rights. One major criticism raised by rights holder representatives is concerns about its potential to reduce royalties paid by Australian schools. Under the current model, a statutory licence is negotiated, resulting in a payment administered by Copyright Agency Ltd (CAL) that "equates to about $17 per school student per year or about $30 per tertiary student". Without this payment to authors CAL argues that "there would be less Australian content on our screens, on our bookshelves and in our schools and universities." On the other hand, the National Copyright Unit representing schools and TAFEs contend that a large portion of this payment relates either to material the author of which cannot be identified, or for materials for which royalty payments are not intended or appropriate. For example, in 2011 they noted that "openly available webpages made up 81.4% of the total web and non web digital materials that were paid for," (including Google Maps and dictionary.com) which resulted in the payment of millions of dollars for activities that would in other countries be considered as not appropriate for remuneration. In May 2017 Wikipedia displayed banners to Australian readers in support of the Productivity Commission's recommendation.

In August 2017 the government published its official response to the PC recommendations and, with regards to the specific recommendation to introduce Fair Use, stated that it "notes this recommendation and will further consult" in early 2018. The government's response was "welcomed" by organisations supporting and opposing the recommendation.

==== Copyright Agency fighting fund ====
In April 2017 it was revealed that CAL had "been diverting payments" valued at $15.5 million AUD – obtained between 2013 and 2016 from orphan works under the educational licensing scheme – to a "fighting fund", which it called the Future Fund, to lobby against fair use, instead of distributing it to authors. In acknowledging the existence of the fund, CAL stated it would be used to "...run any legal cases that would arise as a result of changes in legislation, and cover operating costs while the law remained unsettled and where there had been a reduction in licence fees". Universities Australia argued it was "ironic" to fund a campaign against fair use with money obtained through orphan works: “This just goes to show that Australian authors wouldn’t be harmed if universities and schools could rely on a fair-use exception for copying orphan works...If Australia had a fair-use exception, this money would never have been collected in the first place.” Kim Williams, chair of CAL, responded that “The reason for provisioning this money is simple: any board that does not prudently provision for the risk of a calamitous regulatory change … would be guilty of extreme negligence.”

== Use-cases ==
Over the course of the various public inquiries, many example use-cases for where fair use would be applicable have been proposed. In some circumstances (such as time shifting) the use-case has been incorporated as a new exception under fair dealing, but in most instances the situation remains unchanged. Some most commonly raised examples of currently-illegal or paid-for activities which would fall under fair use include:

- A search engine publishing thumbnail images in search results
- An author quoting a number of unpublished letters in a biography
- A teacher recording a radio/TV news bulletin for use in class
- A Local Council providing access to Development Application (DA) plans to local residents, which it must do to comply with public access to information law
- A classroom viewing a publicly available website.
