= Limitations and exceptions to copyright =

Copyright law

Limitations and exceptions to copyright are provisions, in local copyright law or the Berne Convention, which allow for copyrighted works to be used without a license from the copyright owner.

Limitations and exceptions to copyright relate to a number of important considerations such as market failure, freedom of speech, education and equality of access (such as by the visually impaired). Some view limitations and exceptions as "user rights"—seeing user rights as providing an essential balance to the rights of the copyright owners. There is no consensus among copyright experts as to whether user rights are rights or simply limitations on copyright. The concept of user rights has been recognised by courts, including the Canadian Supreme Court, which classed "fair dealing" as such a user right. These kinds of disagreements in philosophy are quite common in the philosophy of copyright, where debates about jurisprudential reasoning tend to act as proxies for more substantial disagreements about good policy.

== Changing technology ==
The scope of copyright limitations and exceptions became a subject of societal and political debate within various nations in the late 1990s and early 2000s, largely due to the impact of digital technology, the changes in national copyright legislations for compliance with TRIPS, and the enactment of anti-circumvention rules in response to the WIPO Copyright Treaty. The European People's Party concluded that international instruments for the protection of copyright no longer seem capable of guaranteeing creators and investors a fair return on their activities while ensuring the public's access to information and respect for privacy.

Defenders of copyright exceptions fear that technology, contract law undermining copyright law and copyright law not being amended, is reducing the scope of important exceptions and therefore harming creativity.

In May 2010 a declaration entitled Copyright for Creativity was launched, stating: "While exclusive rights have been adapted and harmonised to meet the challenges of the knowledge economy, copyright's exceptions are radically out of line with the needs of the modern information society. The lack of harmonisation of exceptions hinders the circulation of knowledge based goods and services across Europe. The lack of flexibility within the current European exceptions regime also prevents us from adapting to a constantly changing technological environment." This ad-hoc coalition is being registered at the official EU Transparency Register in the section In-house lobbyists. Coordinator of this project runs a Brussels-based public affairs & government relations firm specialised in the online environment, that mainly mentions Industry (a.o. Google) and Trade Associations as its clients.

Attempts at expansion of copyright limitations and exceptions are sometimes regarded as a threat by publishers.

== Competition law / antitrust law ==
Copyright is typically thought of as a limited, legally sanctioned monopoly. Because of this, copyright licensing may sometimes interfere too much in free and competitive markets. These concerns are governed by legal doctrines such as competition law in the European Union, antitrust law in the United States, and anti-monopoly law in Russia and Japan. Competition issues may arise when the licensing party unfairly leverages market power, engages in price discrimination through its licensing terms, or otherwise uses a licensing agreement in a discriminatory or unfair manner. Attempts to extend the copyright term granted by law – for example, by collecting royalties for use of the work after its copyright term has expired and it has passed into the public domain – raise such competition concerns.

In April 1995, the US published "Antitrust Guidelines for the licensing of Intellectual Property" which apply to patents, copyright, and trade secrets. In January 1996, the European Union published Commission Regulation No. 240/96 which applies to patents, copyright, and other intellectual property rights, especially regarding licenses. The guidelines apply mutatis mutandis to the extent possible.

The interplay of copyright law and competition law is increasingly important in the digital world, as most countries' laws allow private contracts to over-ride copyright law. Given that copyright law creates a legally sanctioned monopoly, balanced by "limitations and exceptions" that allow access without the permission of the copyright holder the over-riding of copyright law by private contracts can create monopoly activity. Well known limitations and exceptions include fair dealing in the UK and Canada, as well as the fair use doctrine in the US. The undermining of copyright law, and in particular limitations and exceptions to copyright by contract law is an issue frequently raised by libraries, and library groups such as International Federation of Library Associations and Institutions. As a result of this, this issue is increasingly being looked at and discussed at a national governmental level e.g. UK as well as international level such as WIPO – as part of the Development Agenda.

== International legal instruments ==
Limitations and exceptions are also the subject of significant regulation by global treaties. These treaties have harmonized the exclusive rights which must be provided by copyright laws, and the Berne three-step test operates to constrain the kinds of copyright exceptions and limitations which individual nations can enact.

On the other hand, there are very few requirements in international copyright treaties placed on national governments to provide any exemptions from exclusive rights. One such case is Article 10(1) of the Berne Convention, which guarantees a limited right to make quotations from copyrighted works.

Because of the lack of balance in international treaties in October 2004, WIPO agreed to adopt a significant proposal offered by Argentina and Brazil, the "Proposal for the Establishment of a Development Agenda for WIPO" also known simply as the "Development Agenda" - from the Geneva Declaration on the Future of the World Intellectual Property Organization. This proposal was well supported by developing countries. A number of civil society bodies have been working on a draft Access to Knowledge, or A2K, Treaty which they would like to see introduced.

== National laws ==
Two important examples of limitations and exceptions to copyright are the fair use doctrine found in the United States, and the fair dealing doctrine found in many other common law countries. Other more fundamental boundaries of copyright are caused by thresholds of originalities, a threshold below which objects cease to be copyrightable, the idea-expression dichotomy, the public domain and the effect of Crown copyright. Even copyright maximalists might interpret these as defining copyright, rather than being "limitations" or "exceptions" to it. In addition copyright can only protect the artist's expression of his/her work and not the ideas, systems, or factual information conveyed in it. Likewise, the U.S. courts have determined that stock characters are also uncopyrightable.

While fair use in the United States is popularly understood as the only limitation to an author's exclusive rights, it is only one of several important limitations. Section 106 of the U.S. copyright law, which defines the exclusive rights in copyrighted works, is subject to sections 107 through 122, which limit the copyright holder's exclusive rights.

In the U.S. in stark contrast to those copyright laws which have developed from English law, edicts of government are not subject to copyright, including edicts of foreign governments.

In Canada, items deemed useful articles such as clothing designs are exempted from copyright protection under the Copyright Act if reproduced more than 50 times. Fast fashion brands may reproduce clothing designs from smaller companies without violating copyright protections.

== See also ==
- Berne Convention
- Fair dealing
- Fair use
- Freedom of panorama
- Right to quote
- Copyright law of the European Union
  - The Information Society Directive lists most limitations and exceptions available to the European Union member states
