= Fair dealing =

Limitation and exception to a right granted by copyright law

Fair dealing is a limitation and exception to the exclusive rights granted by copyright law to the author of a creative work. Fair dealing is found in many of the common law jurisdictions of the Commonwealth of Nations.

Fair dealing is an enumerated set of possible defences against an action for infringement of an exclusive right of copyright. Unlike the related United States doctrine of fair use, fair dealing cannot apply to any act which does not fall within one of these categories, although common law courts in some jurisdictions are less stringent than others in this regard. In practice, however, such courts might rule that actions with a commercial character, which might be naïvely assumed to fall into one of these categories, were in fact infringements of copyright, as fair dealing is not as flexible a concept as the American concept of fair use.

There are similar limitations and exceptions to copyright, such as the right to quote, also in the Berne Convention and in the laws of civil law jurisdictions.

== By country ==
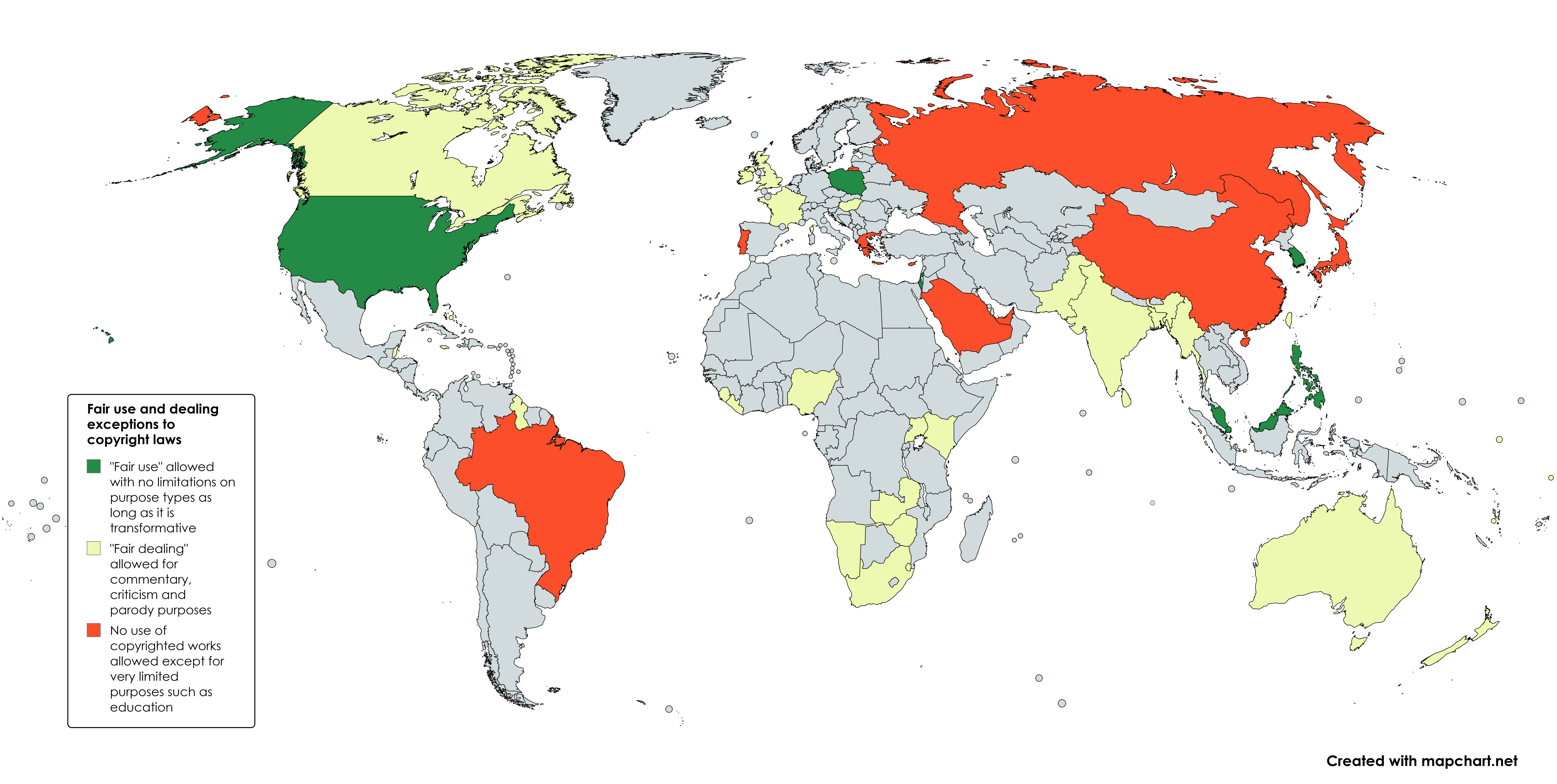
Fair use and dealing exceptions to copyright laws

=== Australia ===
In Australia, the grounds for fair dealing are:

- Research and study (section 40 Copyright Act 1968 (Cth))
- Review and criticism (s41)
- "Reporting the news" (s42)
- Legal advice (although the federal Crown is deemed to own copyright in federal statutes, and the Crown in each state in state statutes). (s43)
- Parody and satire (with some exceptions) (s41A)

Regarding fair dealing with Crown copyright under sections 176-178 of Copyright Act 1968. Section 182A provides that the copyright, including any prerogative right or privilege of the Crown in the nature of copyright, in Acts, Ordinances, regulations etc., and judgments of federal or state courts and certain other tribunals, is not infringed by the making, by reprographic reproduction, of one copy of the whole or part of that work for a particular purpose (this does not apply where charge for copy exceeds cost for copying).

Regarding the re-use of copyrighted images or drawings, the Australian Copyright Act does not impose a 10%-limit under its fair dealing provisions for the purpose of research and study. Instead, every such use for research or study must be evaluated individually to determine whether it is fair, similar to the notion of fair use in U.S. copyright law. Among the criteria used to determine the fairness of a use are the purpose and character of the dealing, the nature of the work, the possibility of obtaining the work commercially within a reasonable time, the effect of the use on the potential market for the work or on its value, and how much of a work is copied.

In 2006, a federal law (Copyright Amendment Act 2006 (Cth) No. 158, 2006) enabled parody and satire to qualify as fair dealing under federal copyright law in certain circumstances.

The amendments in 2006 also added a number of other very specific and quite limited exceptions to copyright for personal use of audio-visual material, including those popularly known as time shifting (s111) and format shifting (s110AA).

Several government inquiries have recommended that Australia change to a Fair Use system. Two of the recommendations were specifically in response to the stricter copyright rules introduced as part of the Australia–United States Free Trade Agreement (AUSFTA), while the most recent two, by the Australian Law Reform Commission and the Productivity Commission were with reference to strengthening Australia's "digital economy".

=== Canada ===
The Canadian concept of fair dealing is similar to that in the UK and Australia. The fair dealing clauses of the Canadian Copyright Act allow users to engage in certain activities relating to research, private study, education, parody, satire, criticism, review, or news reporting. With respect to criticism, review, and news reporting, the user must mention the source of the material, along with the name of the author, performer, maker, or broadcaster for the dealing to be fair.

Prior to 2011, fair dealing in Canada was not definitely found to contain exceptions for parody (unlike fair use in the United States), but the Copyright Act has since been amended to include parody and satire (along with educational use) under its fair dealing provisions. Previously, a Quebec Court of Appeal in Les productions Avanti Cine Video v. Favreau (4 August 1999) had recognized that parody could potentially be a 'critique', but it refused to recognize the exception in that circumstance.

The 2004 ruling by the Supreme Court of Canada in CCH Canadian Ltd. v. Law Society of Upper Canada has gone far in clarifying the concept of fair dealing in Canada. In considering fair dealing the Court makes the following general observation:

It is important to clarify some general considerations about exceptions to copyright infringement. Procedurally, a defendant is required to prove that his or her dealing with a work has been fair; however, the fair dealing exception is perhaps more properly understood as an integral part of the Copyright Act than simply a defence. Any act falling within the fair dealing exception will not be an infringement of copyright. The fair dealing exception, like other exceptions in the Copyright Act, is a user's right. In order to maintain the proper balance between the rights of a copyright owner and users' interests, it must not be interpreted restrictively.

Furthermore, by taking "a liberal approach to the enumerated purposes of the dealing", the Court has made fair dealing more flexible, reducing the gap between this provision and US fair use.

It then establishes six principal criteria for evaluating fair dealing.

1. The purpose of the dealing. Is it for research, private study, criticism, review or news reporting (or additionally, since 2011, education, parody or satire)? It expresses that "these allowable purposes should not be given a restrictive interpretation or this could result in the undue restriction of users' rights." In particular, the Court gave "a large and liberal interpretation" to the notion of research, stating that "lawyers carrying on the business of law for profit are conducting research".
2. The character of the dealing. How were the works dealt with? Was there a single copy or were multiple copies made? Were these copies distributed widely or to a limited group of people? Was the copy destroyed after being used? What is the general practice in the industry?
3. The amount of the dealing. How much of the work was used? What was the importance of the infringed work? Quoting trivial amounts may alone sufficiently establish fair dealing as there would not be copyright infringement at all. In some cases even quoting the entire work may be fair dealing. The amount of the work taken must be fair in light of the purpose of the dealing.
4. Alternatives to the dealing. Was a "non-copyrighted equivalent of the work" available to the user? Was the dealing "reasonably necessary to achieve the ultimate purpose"?
5. The nature of the work. Copying from a work that has never been published could be more fair than from a published work "in that its reproduction with acknowledgement could lead to a wider public dissemination of the work – one of the goals of copyright law. If, however, the work in question was confidential, this may tip the scales towards finding that the dealing was unfair."
6. Effect of the dealing on the work. Is it likely to affect the market of the original work? "Although the effect of the dealing on the market of the copyright owner is an important factor, it is neither the only factor nor the most important factor that a court must consider in deciding if the dealing is fair."

Though the Supreme Court outlined these six criteria, it noted that in some contexts, factors other than those listed may be relevant in determining whether a particular dealing is fair.

On June 2, 2010, the Government of Canada introduced Bill C-32, An Act to amend the Copyright Act. A summary of the changes proposed by this bill in terms of fair dealing notes that C-32 "expands the scope of the fair dealing exception at section 29 of the Act to include new purposes: education, parody or satire". The stated aims of the revised bill were also to "permit businesses, educators and libraries to make greater use of copyright material in digital form". Bill C-32 had not passed by the time the minority Conservative government faced a vote of no confidence and subsequently fell on March 25, 2011.

On September 29, 2011, the bill was re-introduced to the Forty-first Parliament as Bill C-11. With the backing of a majority Conservative government, this version of the Copyright Modernization Act has passed into law. Simply put, the fair dealing amendment in Section 29 of Bill C-11 expands the first criteria for evaluating fair dealing – the purpose of the dealing – to include education, and parody or satire, in addition to research, private study, criticism and review.

In a press release on the Government of Canada's Balanced Copyright site, the Honourable James Moore, Minister of Canadian Heritage and Official Languages, notes that the revamped bill "delivers a common-sense balance between the interests of consumers and the rights of the creative community". Critics of the bill point to "excessively restrictive digital lock amendments" that they claim will create a situation where people "are entitled to use copyrighted content lawfully but [are] prevented from doing so".

=== India ===
A fair dealing with any work (except computer programmes) is allowed in India for the purposes of

1. private or personal use, including research,
2. criticism or review,
3. reporting of current events and current affairs, including the reporting of a lecture delivered in public.

The term 'fair dealing' has not been defined anywhere in the Copyright Act 1957. However, the concept of 'fair dealing' has been discussed in different judgments, including the decision of the Supreme Court of India in Academy of General Education v. B. Malini Mallya (2009) and the decision of the High Court of Kerala in Civic Chandran v. Ammini Amma.

Civic Chandran and Ors. v. C.Ammini Amma and Ors. is a 1996 Kerala High Court judgement that deals with the concept of fair dealing in India. In the case, a drama called "Ningal Enne Communistakki" was written by Thoppil Bhasi in Malayalam. It dealt with some of the burning social and political problems of those days, especially espoused by the then Communist Party of India to come to Power in Kerala during the assembly elections in 1957. The plaintiff brought a claim in this suit because the defendant, according to the plaintiff, had fabricated another drama called "Ningal Aare Communistakki", which was a counter drama to the drama written by Thoppil Bhasi and had been published in the 1995 annual issue of India Today". It was alleged that the defendant had copied substantial portions of the original drama in his work and such reproduction was done without true creative intention and to take advantage of the creative talent and labour of Thoppil Bhasi. The defendant on the other hand, claimed that the counter drama is a new literary innovation 'where a play is counter-posed by using the very same theme and characters. The counter drama was written for the purpose to provide critical analysis of the original drama and to show how the ultimate purpose intended by Thoppil Bhasi has failed. Hence, copying of certain portions can only be treated as 'fair dealing'. The lower court ruled in the favor of the plaintiff and said, "Copying down or extracting substantial portions of the drama, and using the same characters and dialogues of the drama with some comments here and there through two-three characters in the counter-drama cannot be treated as fair dealing for the purpose of criticism". Thus, he was not provided any protection under section 52 of the Copyright Act.

An appeal was filed against this judgement in the Kerala High Court, where the Court looked at the case while referring to sections 14,51 and 52 of Copyright Act. Herein, the defendant claimed that since there was high probability of the defence of fair dealing being applicable in the case, irreparable injury that could have been caused, especially, looking at the current political scenario in Kerala, which would also show a lack of balance of convenience. If the counter-drama is not staged, there essence would be lost. Plaintiffs argued that the lower court's decision should not be reversed unless the same is found to be completely illegal or perverse.

The Indian Copyright Act does not provide for a definition for 'fair dealing' but section 52(1)(a) and (b) specifically refers to fair dealing of the work and not the reproduction of the work. Hence, the court needs to take into account the following 3 aspects:

1. The quantum and value of the matter taken in relation to the comments or criticism;
2. The purpose for which it was taken; and
3. The likelihood of competition between the two works.

Along with the aforementioned aspects, the balancing aspect given in the case American Cyanamid v. Ethicon by Lord Diplock should be taken into account. As this suit was filed for granting interim injunction, the following also needs to be taken into account:

1. Establishment of a prima facie case;
2. The balance of convenience;
3. Irreparable injury likely to be caused in case the injunction is refused.

Subsequently, the Court relied on the decision given in Hubbard v Vosper, wherein Lord Denning had clarified that fair dealing is a question of degree. The number and extent of extracts and quotations and the use made of them need to be given due consideration. Also. there was also some reliance placed on R. G. Anand v. M/s Delux Films and Ors., wherein it was stated that the safest and the surest test to determine copyright infringement is to see if the spectator, after having seen both the works, gets an unmistakable impression that the subsequent work appears to be a copy of the original. After analysing every scene of the counter drama and the drama, the Court reached the conclusion that the scenes and characters were not borrowed from the original drama for the purpose of reproduction in a substantial manner. The real objective of the counter-drama was to criticize the ideology depicted in the drama and to show how the drama had been unsuccessful in achieving the targets it had purported to have aimed for. It also said that there was enough material in the counter-drama to show that the Defendant had used labour and skill of his own and the differences between the original drama and the counter-drama could not be considered inconsequential. The portions of the original drama which were copied in the counter-drama were taken only to make the criticism more effective. Thus, no prima facie case could be established against the defendant. Also, there is no competition between the drama and the counter-drama. Moreover, if the injunction is granted, it would cause irreparable injury to the Defendants as they had made all arrangements to stage the counter drama and a huge amount of money was spent in that.

Hence, the decision of the Additional District Judge was reversed and it was held that even if the copying was of substantial portions, the same could be excused as it constituted fair dealing, as it was also in public interest.

=== New Zealand ===
In New Zealand, fair dealing includes some copying for private study, research, criticism, review, and news reporting. Sections 42 and 43 of the Copyright Act 1994 set out the types of copying that qualify. The criteria are perhaps most similar to those applying in the UK, although commercial research can still count as fair dealing in New Zealand. Incidental copying, while allowed, is not defined as "fair dealing" under the Act. As in Canada, fair dealing is not an infringement of copyright.

The factors determining whether copying for research or private study is judged to be fair dealing in New Zealand are its purpose, its effect on the potential market or value of the work copied, the nature of the work, the amount copied in relation to the whole work, and whether or not the work could have been obtained in a reasonable time at an ordinary commercial price.

=== Singapore ===
Under the provisions for "fair dealing" in the Copyright Act, Chapter 63 of Singapore Statutes, a certain amount of copying for legitimate purposes, such as for the purpose of research or education, is permissible as long as it is a "fair dealing".

In deciding whether the use is a fair dealing, the following factors will be considered

- purpose and character of the dealing, including whether such dealing is of a commercial nature or is for non-profit educational purposes;
- nature of the work or adaptation;
- amount copied, relative to the whole work;
- effect of the dealing upon the potential market for the work, and effect upon its value;
- the possibility of obtaining the work or adaptation within a reasonable time at an ordinary commercial price.

In other cases, a fair dealing for the purpose of criticism or review; for the purpose reporting of news; for the purpose of judicial proceedings or professional advice would not constitute an infringement. In the case of criticism or review and the reporting of news, a sufficient acknowledgment of the work is required.

The reporting of the news could be by any means of communication to the public.

It is not an infringement if a person makes a copy from an original copy of a computer program which he or she owns for the purpose of using that duplicate copy as a back-up.

=== South Africa ===
In South Africa, fair dealing is dealt with in the Copyright Act of 1978 (Act 98 of 1978, including subsequent amendments). Fair dealing itself is described in section 12(1) of the Act, whereas sections 13 to 19 explains various exceptions to copyright. Section 20 deals with the author's moral rights, which, if infringed, may also impact on a fair dealing ruling.

According to this Act,

Copyright shall not be infringed by any fair dealing with a literary or musical work

- (a) for the purposes of research or private study by, or the personal or private use of, the person using the work;
- (b) for the purposes of criticism or review of that work or of another work; or
- (c) for the purpose of reporting current events
  - (i) in a newspaper, magazine or similar periodical; or
  - (ii) by means of broadcasting or in a cinematograph film;

Provided that, in the case of paragraphs (b) and (c)(i), the source shall be mentioned, as well as the name of the author if it appears on the work.

Section 12 mentions both "fair dealing" and "fair practice", and it would seem that these two terms are equivalents. Musical works are compositions (i.e. manuscripts), not music recordings. The fair dealing exceptions do not apply to music recordings.

=== United Kingdom ===
Under the Copyright, Designs and Patents Act 1988 (CDPA), fair dealing is limited to the following purposes: research and private study (both must be non-commercial), criticism / review / quotation, and news reporting (sections 29, 30, 178); as well as parody, caricature and pastiche (section 30A) and illustration for teaching. Although not actually defined as a fair dealing, incidental inclusion of a copyrighted work in an artistic work, sound recording, film, broadcast or cable programme does not infringe copyright. Since 2014 the UK has protected the fair dealing exceptions from override by contracts or contractual terms and conditions.

Contrary to the often stated view, the provisions of section 29 of the CDPA do not state the amount of an in-copyright work that may be copied for the purposes of non-commercial research or private study or to single copies of the work, where the copies are made by the researcher or student himself. Such restrictions only apply to copies made by or on behalf of a librarian (by virtue of s. 40), or by a person, other than the researcher or student himself, who knows or has reason to believe that "it will result in copies of substantially the same material being provided to more than one person at substantially the same time and for substantially the same purpose" (by virtue of s. 29(3)b).

For copying beyond the boundaries of fair dealing, universities and schools in the UK obtain licences from a national copyright collective, the UK Copyright Licensing Agency (CLA). Under these licences, multiple copies of portions of copyrighted works can be made for educational purposes.

The UK was the only member state of the European Union that did not have a private copy exception, since the High Court quashed the relevant regulations in R (Basca and others) v Secretary of State for Business, Innovation and Skills [2015] EWHC 2041 (Admin). Consequently, now commonplace activities such as format shifting (saving one's music contained in their CDs on their MP3 players or on their smartphones) are illegal, but in practice the prohibition is not enforced.

=== United States ===
The parallel concept in United States copyright law is fair use, which is now statutory but originally arose in case law under the freedom of speech and freedom of the press provisions of the First Amendment to the Constitution. It is much broader than the British concept as there is no list of non-infringing uses; these are instead defined by case law with reference to the general nature and purpose of the use.

The term "fair dealing" has a different meaning in the U.S. It is a duty of full disclosure imposed upon corporate officers, fiduciaries, and parties to contracts. In the reported cases, it usually arises in the context of the "implied covenant of good faith and fair dealing", which underlies the tort cause of action for insurance bad faith.

== See also ==
- Digital rights management
- Fair use
- Limitations and exceptions to copyright
- Right to quote
- Rameshwari Photocopy Service shop copyright case
