= List of copyright duration by country =

Worldwide map of copyright term length

Copyright is the right to copy and publish a particular work. The terms "copy" and "publish" are quite broad. They include copying in electronic form, making translated versions, creating a television program based on the work, and putting the work on the Internet. A work is protected by copyright if it is a literary or artistic work. This general expression covers almost all products of creative and original effort. Copyright protects only the specific expression of an idea, not the idea itself. A collection of facts may be copyrighted if there was creative activity involved in compiling the collection. Several countries provide separate protection for collections of facts that qualify as "databases", but that provision is not considered copyright. Copyright protection is automatic upon creation of the work. In some countries, registration with a copyright office has additional benefits, such as the ability to sue, or to receive more money in damages. When a work's copyright term ends, the work passes into the public domain.

== Berne Convention ==
Signatory states of the Berne Convention

The Berne Convention stipulates that the duration of the term for copyright protection is the life of the author plus at least 50 years after their death. For some categories of works, the minimum duration is shorter: for example, the minimum term for applied art is 25 years, while movies have a minimum term of 50 years. Most countries have opted for a longer term of protection, as permitted.

Under the Convention, the duration of copyright depends on the length of the author's life. Berne specifies that copyright exists a minimum of 50 years after the author's death, while a number of countries, including members of the European Union and the United States, have extended that to 70 years after the author's death. A small number of countries have extended copyright even further, with Mexico having the longest term at 100 years after the author's death.

=== United States ===
In 1989, the Berne Convention became effective in the U.S. Since that date, U.S. authors obtain copyright on their works automatically, with registration no longer required. However, many U.S. texts on copyright have not been updated and still echo the old registration principle.

Copyright registration remains available in the U.S. To initiate a lawsuit against an infringer, registration is still required. Registration offers the potential of statutory damages from the infringer, rather than only actual damages.

=== European Union ===
All countries within the European Union are signatory states of the Berne Convention. Additionally, Copyright in the European Union is regulated through European Directives.

The member states of the European Union have, following a directive, increased the term to life of the author plus 70 years after their death. Although this was not the original intention, the extension applies retroactively; this had the effect that works that had ended up in the public domain because the author was dead for 50 years, received an additional twenty years of protection.

European countries follow the principle that copyright protection is granted automatically upon creation of the work. This principle was first established in the Berne Convention (1886), and Article 5 of the Convention expressly forbids any member country to require formal action for copyright protection.

== Copyright duration by country ==
Countries and respective copyright terms, with length of standard copyright in years are listed. Entries for non-country entities are included: the European Union, Berne Convention, and the Universal Copyright Convention, which set minimum terms for their member states or signatories. The Agreement on Trade Related Aspects of Intellectual Property Rights (TRIPS), though not included, requires a copyright length of at least 50 years after death.

=== Legend ===
- 0, has no copyright = Not copyrighted at all
- Life + xx years = Copyrighted for authors' lifetime plus xx years after their deaths
- xx years after publication, creation, etc. = copyrighted for xx years since publication, creation, etc., of works
- Until year end = Copyrighted until the end of a calendar year, i.e. 31 December, unless otherwise specified
- Berne = Country has signed the Berne Convention, see Berne in the "Countries, ..." column
- TRIPS = The Agreement on Trade Related Aspects of Intellectual Property Rights (TRIPS) is an international agreement administered by the World Trade Organization (WTO) that sets down minimum standards for many forms of intellectual property (IP) regulation as applied to nationals of other WTO Members. This also indicates that this country has at least a minimum of 50 years after the death of the creator until the copyright expires.
- WCT = The World Intellectual Property Organization Copyright Treaty, (WIPO Copyright Treaty or WCT), is an international treaty on copyright law adopted by the member states of the World Intellectual Property Organization (WIPO) in 1996.

=== Table ===
Countries, areas, and entities	Copyright terms based on authors' deaths (Note: Terms of protection were taken from a variety of sources, including WIPO, UNESCO and the University of Pennsylvania (see External links). Where no more specific information is available for a country, an indication of its probable minimum copyright term can be gained from its status as: a signatory of the Berne Convention ("Berne"); minimum term of life + 50 years, except for photographs.; a member of the WTO ("TRIPS"); minimum term of life + 50 years.; a candidate for membership of the European Union ("EU"); term must be life + 70 years before accession.)	Copyright terms based on publication and creation dates	Until year end?
Afghanistan	Life + 50 years	50 years from publication (anonymous or pseudonymous work) 50 years from publication (published after authors' deaths); 50 years from publication (audiovisual works); 50 years from publication (photographic, painting works); 50 years from creation (phonogram)	Yes (Afghan calendar)
Albania	Life + 70 years	70 years from publication (anonymous or pseudonymous work) 70 years from publication; 70 years from creation if unpublished (photographic or audiovisual work of joint authorship); 25 years from production (works of applied art)	Yes
Algeria	Life + 50 years (except posthumous work)	50 years from publication; 50 years from creation if unpublished (collective work, anonymous or pseudonymous work, audiovisual work, posthumous work) 50 years from creation (photographs or the work of applied art)	Yes
Andorra	Life + 70 years (Note: An audiovisual work is copyrighted in Andorra for the same term, computed from the last of the following persons to survive: the principal director, the author of the scenario, the author of the dialogue and the composer of music specifically created for the audiovisual work.)	70 years from publication; 70 years from creation if unpublished (collective work with unknown authorship) 70 years from publication (anonymous or pseudonymous work)	Yes
Angola	Life + 70 years Life + 45 years (photographic works or applied arts)		Yes
Anguilla	Life + 50 years	50 years from the death of the author, of the last surviving author for works with more than one author.	
Antigua and Barbuda	Life + 50 years	50 years from publication; 50 years from creation if unpublished (anonymous or pseudonymous work, computer generated work, sound recording or film) 50 years from creation (broadcast); 50 years after programme included in a cable programme service 25 years from publication (typographical arrangement of a published edition)	Yes
Argentina	Life + 70 years	50 years from publication (anonymous intellectual works belonging to institutions, corporations or legal persons); Phonograms: 70 years from first publication. Photographs: 20 years from first publication. Cinematographic works: 50 years after death of the last survivor among the producer, the director, the screenplay writer or the composer (for musical comedies).	Yes
Armenia	Life + 70 years	70 years from publication (anonymous or pseudonymous works)	Yes
Aruba	Life + 50 years^{(wikisource)}		
Australia (including external territories)	Life + 70 years	70 years from publication (sound recordings, cinematograph films) 50 years after making (television broadcasts and sound broadcasts); 25 years from publication (published editions of works) [50 years from publication (photographs, no longer applicable since 1 January 2005)]	Yes
Austria	Life + 70 years (Note: A cinematographic work is copyrighted in Austria for the same term, computed from the last surviving person among the following: the principal director of the film and the authors of the screenplay, the dialogues and the musical work specially created for the cinematographic work.)	70 years from publication; 70 years from creation if unpublished (anonymous or pseudonymous work)	Yes
Azerbaijan	Life + 70 years (except posthumous work published at first time during 30 years)	70 years from publication (anonymous or pseudonymous work; posthumous work published at first time during 30 years)	Yes
Bahamas	Berne		
Bahrain	Life + 50 calendar years (except posthumous work)	50 calendar years from publication (cinematographic films, applied arts works and photographs; anonymous or pseudonymous works; corporate works; posthumous works) 40 years from publication or 50 years from completion, whichever is shorter (computer software)	
Bangladesh	Life + 60 years or Publication + 60 years	60 years from publication (cinematographic films, sound recordings, photographs, computer programmes or works of the Government, local authority or an international organisation)	Yes
Barbados	Life + 50 years	50 years from publication (anonymous or pseudonymous works) 50 years from making (computer-generated work); 50 years from publication; 50 years from creation if unpublished (sound recordings and films); 50 years from creation (broadcast); 50 years after programme included in a cable programme service 25 years from publication (typographical arrangement of a published edition)	Yes
Belarus	Life + 50 years	50 years from publication or if unpublished 50 years from creation (anonymous or pseudonymous works) 50 years from fixation (performance); 50 years from publication or if unpublished 50 years from fixation (phonogram); 50 years from the first broadcast or cable transmission	Yes
Belgium	Life + 70 years		Yes
Belize	Life + 50 years	50 years from publication (anonymous or pseudonymous work); 50 years from publication (sound recording or film); 50 years from publication (computer-generated work)	Yes
Benin	Life + 50 years		
Bermuda	Life + 50 years		
Berne Convention signatories	Life + 50 years Signatories may grant longer terms.	50 years from publication or if not shown 50 years from creation (cinematographic works) 50 years from publication (anonymous or pseudonymous works); 25 years from creation (photographic works); Signatories may grant longer terms.	Yes
Bhutan	Life + 50 years		
Bolivia	Life + 50 years		
Bosnia and Herzegovina	Life + 70 years		
Botswana	Berne, TRIPS, WCT		
Brazil	Life + 70 years	Publication + 70 years (audiovisual and photograpical works) Publication + 70 years (anonymous and pseudonymous works) Creation + 70 years (sound recordings) Publication + 50 years, or, if unpublished, creation + 50 years (computer programs)	Yes
British Indian Ocean Territory	Life + 70 Years		
British Virgin Islands	Life + 70 Years		
Brunei	Life + 50 years		
Bulgaria	Life + 70 years (EU)		
Burkina Faso	Life + 70 years		
Burundi	Life + 50 years	50 years from publication (phonograms)	
Cambodia	Life + 50 years		
Cameroon	Life + 50 years		
Canada	Life + 70 years (except certain posthumous works) [Life + 50 years (death before 1972)]	75 years from publication or 100 years from creation, whichever is shorter (anonymous works). There is no revival of copyright in any work in which the copyright had expired before the coming into force in January 2023 of the extension of the term of copyright from 50 to 70 years. 50 years from publication (certain posthumous works)	Yes
Cape Verde	Life + 50 years		
Cayman Islands	Life + 70 years		
Central African Republic	Berne, TRIPS		
Chad	Berne, TRIPS		
Chile	Life + 70 years		
China (mainland only)	Life + 50 years (citizens' works)	50 years from publication, or if unpublished, 50 years from creation (works of legal entities, cinematographic works, films or photographic works)	Yes
Colombia	Life + 80 years	80 years from publication (cinematographic works)	Yes
Comoros	Berne		
Congo, Democratic Republic of the	Life + 50 years	25 years from publication (photograph works). 50 years from publication (anonymous, pseudonymous or posthumous work)	Yes
Congo, Republic of the	Life + 50 years	25 years from creation (photographic work and work of applied art)	
Costa Rica	Life + 70 years		
Croatia	Life + 70 years		
Cuba	Life + 50 years		
Curaçao	Life + 50 years		
Cyprus	Life + 70 years (EU, WCT)		
Czech Republic	Life + 70 years	70 years from publication (anonymous works)	Yes
Denmark	Life + 70 years (Note: Examples of protected works are literature, music, theatre, film, the visual arts – including photography, architecture, decorative arts – and computer programmes. It is the expression of the work which is protected – that is to say, the work's singular design or presentation. Copyright applies from the moment of creation of the work. Thus, protection does not depend on any kind of registration.)		
Djibouti	Life + 50 years	For a cinematographic work, 50 years from the date when the work was made lawfully accessible to the public with the author's consent. For a photographic work or work of applied art, 25 years from the production of the work	Yes
Dominica	Life + 70 years		
Dominican Republic	Life + 70 years		
Ecuador	Life + 70 years		
Egypt	Life + 50 years		
El Salvador	Life + 70 years	70 years from publication (anonymous or pseudonymous works)	
Equatorial Guinea	Life + 80 years. However, there are additional expiration rules in Article 38 of the Main Equatorial Guinea Intellectual Property Law which may affect this.		
Eritrea	Life only, but at least 50 years since publication, whichever is longer (except posthumous works)	50 years since publication (posthumous works)	
Estonia	Life + 70 years (EU)	70 years from publication (anonymous or pseudonymous works)	Yes
Eswatini	Life + 50 years		
Ethiopia	Life + 50 years		
European Union Members	Life + 70 years	Anonymous or pseudonymous works only: "70 years after the work is lawfully made available to the public" (Art.1(3)). Protection ends if the work is not made available within 70 years from creation. (Art.1(6)).	Yes
Fiji	Life + 50 years		
Finland	Life + 70 years	50 years from publication (sound recordings, television broadcasts and sound broadcasts) 50 years from creation (photographic works)	Yes
France	Life + 70 years (except posthumous works published after this term) (Note: An audiovisual work is copyrighted in France for the same term, computed from the last surviving person among the following: the author of the scenario, the author of the dialogue, the author of the musical compositions, with or without words, specially composed for the work and the main director.) The following additions to copyright term formerly applied to all works, but the French Cour de Cassation has found them to be superseded by later copyright treaties, thus limiting the copyright term to life + 70 years total, at least for non-musical works of authors who did not "die for France". + 6 years and 152 days for musical works, or for all works if the author died on active service, which were published through 1920 + 8 years and 120 days for musical works, or for all works if the author died on active service, which were published through 1947 + 30 years for all works if the author died on active service (based on the former copyright term, which was life + 50 years, meaning that, in practice, the addition is 10 years longer than the current life + 70 years term)	70 years from publication (pseudonymous, anonymous or collective works) 25 years from publication (posthumous works published after Art. L123-1 term)	Yes
Gabon	Berne, TRIPS, WCT		
Gambia	Life + 50 years		
Georgia	Life + 70 years		
Germany	Life + 70 years	25 years from first publication or first public performance if copyright has expired before such publication or performance, or if the work has never been protected in Germany and the author died more than 70 years before the first publication	Yes
Ghana	Life + 70 years		
Greece	Life + 70 years (Note: An audiovisual work is copyrighted in Greece for the same term, computed from the last of the following persons to survive: the principal director, the author of the screenplay, the author of the dialogue and the composer of the music specifically created for use in the audiovisual work.)	70 years from publication (anonymous or pseudonymous works)	Yes
Grenada	Berne, TRIPS		
Guatemala	Life + 75 years	75 years from publication or if unpublished 75 years from creation (computer programs and collective works; anonymous or pseudonymous works; audiovisual works)	Yes
Guinea	TRIPS, WCT		
Guinea-Bissau	Berne, TRIPS		
Guyana	Life + 50 years		
Haiti	Berne, TRIPS		
Honduras	Life + 75 years	70 years from publication or, if unpublished within 50 years, 70 years from creation (works of applied art and photographs)	Yes
Hong Kong (Note: The Special Administrative Regions of Hong Kong and Macau have their own status, distinct from that of the rest of China, under international copyright and trade law)	Life + 50 years (literary, dramatic, musical or artistic works with known authorship) Life + 50 years (films) (Note: Computed from the last of the following persons with known identity to survive: (a) the principal director; (b) the author of the screenplay; (c) the author of the dialogue; or (d) the composer of music specially created for and used in the film.)	50 years from publication or if unpublished 50 years from creation (literary, dramatic, musical or artistic works with unknown authorship) 50 years from publication or if unpublished 50 years from creation (sound recordings); 50 years from creation (broadcast); 50 years after programme included in a cable programme service 25 years from publication (typographical arrangement of published editions)	Yes
Hungary	Life + 70 years If there are multiple authors, life of last surviving author + 70 years	70 years and shall be counted from the first day of the year following the first disclosure of the work in case the person of the author is unknown. However, should the author become known during this period of time, the term of protection shall be counted from the first day of the year following the death of the author. 70 years counted from the first day of the year following the first disclosure of a collective work or a cinematographic creation. 25 years from the first day of the year following the first disclosure if copyright protection of a scope consistent with the author's economic rights shall be due to the person who, following the expiration of the term of protection or the period of time determined in the term of protection shall be counted from a date other than the first day of the year following the death of the author, the author dying last, or the joint author, discloses according to the law a work previously not disclosed to the public. As an exception expressions of folklore themselves do not, however, enjoy copyright protection in Hungary.	Yes
Iceland	Life + 70 years		
India	Life + 60 years (except posthumous works) (Note: Literary, dramatic, musical, and non-photograph artistic works.)	60 years from publication (posthumous works, photographs, cinematograph films, sound recordings, works of public undertakings, and works of international organisations)	Yes
Indonesia	Life + 70 years	70 years from the author's death for books, musics, etc. 50 years after publication for cinematography, photograph, etc.	
Iran	Life + 50 years	30 years from publication (photographic or cinematographic works)	
Iraq	Life + 50 years	5 years from publication (photographic works)	
(Republic of Ireland) Ireland	Life + 70 years		Yes
Israel	Life + 70 years	50 years from publication (photographs created until May 2007)	Yes
Italy	Life + 70 years [Life + 50 years]	70 years from publication (anonymous or pseudonymous work) 20 years from publication (copyright of State, the provinces, the communes, the academies or public cultural organizations, or to private legal entities of a non-profit making character)	Yes
Ivory Coast	Life + 70 years (except posthumous works published within this period)	70 years from publication (photographic or audiovisual works or works of applied art; anonymous or pseudonymous works; posthumous works)	Yes
Jamaica	Life + 95 years (for authors that died in 1962 or later) Life + 50 years (for authors that died before 1962)	95 years from publication (anonymous or pseudonymous work, work for hire) 95 years from creation (computer-generated work, broadcast, cable programme); 95 years from publication or if unpublished 95 years from creation (sound recording or film); 50 years from publication (typographical arrangement of a published edition)	Yes
Japan	Life + 70 years	70 years from publication, or if unpublished, 70 years from creation (cinematographic works) 70 years from publication, or if unpublished, 70 years from creation (works of a legal person or other corporate body); 70 years from creation (cinematographic works), and 38 years after the film director's death (for films released before 1971), whichever comes last.	Yes
Jordan	Life + 50 years		
Kazakhstan	Life + 50 years		
Kenya	Life + 50 years (literary, musical or artistic work other than photographs)	50 years from the latest of creation or publication (audio-visual works and photographs)	Yes
Kiribati	Life + 50 years		
Kosovo	Life only		Yes
Kuwait	TRIPS		
Kyrgyzstan	Life + 50 years		
Laos	Life + 50 years (Note: The law entered into force 16 January 2012.)	50 years after making available. Also: • Anonymous/pseudonymous work: 50 years from the date the work was made available to the public; • Cinematographic work: 50 years from making available, failing that, 50 years from making; • Applied art: 25 years from date of creation. Related: Performances, phonograms, broadcasts: 50 years since the date of performance, fixation, and broadcast, respectively.	
Latvia	Life + 70 years [Life + 50 years]	70 years from publication (anonymous or pseudonymous work)	Yes
Lebanon	Life + 50 years	50 years after lawful publication; failing publication, 50 years after work completion. Also: • economic rights: 50 years from performance. • moral rights: perpetual • broadcasters' rights: 20 years after first broadcasting.	
Lesotho	Life + 50 years		
Liberia	Life + 50 years		
Libya	Life + 25 years with 50-year minimum (as of 1968; may have changed since)		
Liechtenstein	Life + 70 years [Life + 50 years]		
Lithuania	Life + 70 years [Life + 50 years]		
Luxembourg	Life + 70 years [Life + 50 years]		
Macau	Life + 50 years	50 years from publication (anonymous works) 50 years from publication (audiovisual works); 25 years from completion (works of applied art)	Yes
Madagascar	Life + 70 years		
Malawi	Life + 50 years		
Malaysia	Life + 50 years (literary, musical and artistic works, not posthumous)	50 years after publication (posthumous work, published edition, film, live performance) 50 years after publication or if unpublished 50 years from creation (anonymous, pseudonymous work, sound recording, broadcast, film); 50 years after being made (broadcast)	Yes
Maldives	Life + 50 years		
Mali	Life + 50 years		
Malta	Life + 70 years		Yes
Marshall Islands	0, no copyright. (Note: Unauthorized sale or commercial use of sound & audio-visual recordings is prohibited (Unauthorized Copies of Recorded Materials Act, 1991).) At this stage the Republic of Marshall Islands is not member to any international convention [or treaty] on copyright Instead applies a non-copyright-based protection regime.	0, no copyright. Instead applies a non-copyright-based protection regime.	
Mauritania	Berne, TRIPS		
Mauritius	Life + 50 years		
Mexico	Life + 100 years for works in copyright on and after 23 July 2003 The duration of copyright protection in Mexico has steadily increased, from life + 20 years post mortem (Law of 1948), to life + 25 years (Law of 1956), to life + 30 years (Decree of 1963), to life + 50 years (Decree of 1982), to life + 75 years (Law of 1996), and to life + 100 years (Decree of 2003). The extensions to 50, 75 and 100 years post mortem applied to all works in copyright when they came into force but did not revive the copyright of works that had previously passed into the public domain.	75 years from the first fixation of the recording or the first performance/recording of the performance, respectively.; 50 years from first publication of the book, the first fixation of the recording, or the first broadcast.	Yes
Micronesia	Life + 50 years		
Moldova	Life + 70 years		
Monaco	Life + 50 years		
Mongolia	Life + 50 years		
Montenegro (Note: Montenegro is assumed to have succeeded to the copyright obligations of Serbia and Montenegro. See Serbia also.)	Life + 70 years		
Morocco	Life + 50 years	70 years after a work's lawful publication; if no lawful publication has taken place within 50 years of the making, copyright lasts for 70 years after the work's communication to the public; if no lawful communication to the public has taken place within 50 years of the making, copyright lasts for 70 years after the work is made; and moral rights last perpetually. 70 years for Performers' rights, if no lawful publication has taken place within 50 years of the performance, copyright lasts for 70 years after the work's first performance. 70 years for Broadcasters' rights: if no lawful publication has taken place within 50 years of the work's creation, copyright lasts for 70 years after the work's creation.	
Mozambique	Life + 70 years		
Myanmar	TRIPS		
Namibia	Life + 50 years (except posthumous works)	50 years from publication (posthumous works) 50 years from publication or if unpublished 50 years from creation (cinematograph films, photographs and computer programs)	Yes
Nauru	Life + 50 years	25 years after work was made (applied art) 25 years after publication (typographical arrangement of a published edition); 50 years after the latest of creation, availability to the public, or publication (collective work or film); 100 years after creation (government works)	Yes
Nepal	Life + 50 years	25 years from creation (applied art and photographic work)	
Netherlands	Life + 70 years	70 years from publication (anonymous or pseudonymous work, corporate works with no listed natural author) 25 years from publication (works first published more than 70 years after the death of the author)	Yes
Caribbean Netherlands	Life + 50 years		
New Zealand	Life + 50 years (literary, dramatic, musical, or artistic work)	50 years from creation (computer-generated work)	Yes
Nicaragua	Life + 70 years		
Niger	Life + 50 years		
Nigeria	Life + 70 years (literary, musical or artistic works other than photographs)	70 years from publication (literary, musical or non-photograph artistic works in the case of government or a body corporate) 50 years from publication (cinematograph films and photographs); 50 years from publication (sound recordings); 50 years from publication (broadcasts)	Yes
North Korea	Life + 50 years	Works authored by "an institution, enterprise or organization", 50 years from publication	
North Macedonia	Life + 70 years		
Norway	Life + 70 years Life + 15 years, but no less than 50 years after publication ("'simple' photographs")	70 years following the year of death of the author (i.e. an author that died in 1950 will have their works protected until 1 January 2021). In a collective or joint work, this is counted from the death of the longest surviving author. For a motion picture, the following are to be considered authors: main director, scriptwriter, dialogue author, and composer of original musical score. 70 years for anonymous works from the year when the work was created. If such an unpublished work, whose copyright has expired, is then later published, the publisher is entitled for a copyright for 25 years from the year of publication One exception from the rule is works that are already in public domain in their country of origin who are members of the Berne Union and/or WTO. These will enter public domain in Norway once they enter public domain in the country of their origin even if less than 70 years have passed since the creators' death. "Norway also has some peculiar laws that protect «simple» photographs. I.e. photographs, such as snapshots, that are below the threshold of originality to merit copyright protection are given neighbouring rights protection. [..] The Norwegian copyright act does not address public domain directly. The Norwegian copyright law defines two basic rights for authors: economic rights and moral rights. [..] For material that is outside the scope of copyright, the phrase «i det fri» («in the free») is used. This corresponds roughly to the term «public domain» in English. Norwegian copyright law makes a distinction between copyright and neighbouring rights. Only creative and artistic works are subject to copyright. Some other types of works are protected by so-called neighbouring rights."	Yes
Oman	Life + 70 years	90 years from the year following the publication 120 years from the year following the completion	Yes
Pakistan	Life + 50 years		Yes
Palau	Life + 50 years		
Panama	Life + 70 years		Yes
Papua New Guinea	Life + 50 years		
Paraguay	Life + 70 years		
Peru	Life + 70 years		
Philippines	Life + 50 years	50 years from publication (photographic works), or 50 years from creation if unpublished within 50 years of creation	Yes
Poland	Life + 70 years		
Portugal	Life + 70 years [Life + 50 years]		
Qatar	Life + 50 years		
Romania	Life + 70 years		
Russia	Life + 70 years Life + 74 years (for those who fought in or worked during the Great Patriotic War (1941–1945)) Date of rehabilitation + 70 (74) years (for unlawfully prosecuted and posthumously rehabilitated) Protection applies if copyright term of Life + 50 years (or Life + 54 years) did not expire by 1 January 1993.	50 years from publication (radio and television broadcasts) 50 years from creation if unpublished, or 50 years from publication (sound records) 70 years from publication (anonymous works) 70 years from publication if published within 70 years from death (posthumous publication) 70 years from publication if published before 3 August 1993 by a corporation (cinematographic, television, radio works, print periodicals and compilations). Protection term applies to "the whole work" only, i.e. individual authors of each protectable part of the whole work retain their own copyright All works published prior to the October Revolution (7 November 1917) are believed to be uncopyrighted.	
Rwanda	Berne, TRIPS		
Saint Helena	Life + 50 years		
Saint Kitts and Nevis	Life + 50 years		
Saint Lucia	Life + 50 years		
Saint Vincent and the Grenadines	Life + 75 years (literary, dramatic, musical or artistic work)	75 years from publication or if unpublished 50 years from creation (sound recording or film) 50 years from creation (computer-generated work); 50 years from creation (broadcast); 50 years after programme included in a cable programme service	Yes
Samoa	Life + 75 years		
San Marino	Life + 50 years		
São Tomé and Príncipe	Life + 70 years		
Saudi Arabia	Life + 50 years	The period of copyright for the author of a work shall be for the duration of his life and for a period of fifty years following his death.	
Senegal	Life + 70 years		
Serbia (Note: Serbia is deemed to be a successor state of Serbia and Montenegro, which itself was a successor state to Yugoslavia for international copyright treaties, notably the Berne Convention, effective 17 June 1930)	Life + 70 years		
Seychelles	Life + 50 years	50 years from publication (audio-visual works) 25 years from creation (applied art)	Yes
Sierra Leone	Life + 50 years	50 years from publication (photograph, film, or broadcast) 50 years from creation (sound recording)	
Singapore	Life + 70 years (except posthumous work)	70 years from publication (posthumous work, photograph) 70 years from publication (sound recordings and cinematograph films); 50 years after making (television broadcasts, sound broadcasts, cable programmes); 25 years from publication (published editions of works)	Yes
Sint Maarten	Life + 50 years		
Slovakia	Life + 70 years		
Slovenia	Life + 70 years		
Solomon Islands	Life + 50 years		
Somalia	Very unclear. See the discussion at Commons.		
South Africa	Life + 50 years (literary or musical works or artistic works, other than photographs)	50 years from publication or if unpublished 50 years from creation (cinematography films, photographs, computer programs) 50 years from publication (sound recordings; broadcasts; programme-carrying signals; and published editions)	Yes
South Korea	Life + 70 years (amended on 2011-06-30)	70 years from publication (anonymous or pseudonymous work) 70 years from publication, or if unpublished within 50 years, 70 years from creation (works made for hire, cinematographic works)	Yes
Spain	Life + 70 years (for authors that died on or after 7 December 1987) Life + 80 years (for authors that died before 7 December 1987)		Yes
Sri Lanka	Life + 70 years	70 years from publication or if unpublished 50 years from completion (audiovisual work); 25 years from publication (applied art)	Yes
Sudan	Life + 50 years	25 years from publication (photographic pictures and cinematographic films and other audiovisual works; works published under unknown pseudonym or anonymously)	
Suriname	Life + 50 years	50 years from publication (anonymous or pseudonymous work) (art. 39)	Yes
Sweden	Life + 70 years		Yes
Switzerland	Life + 70 years effective 1 July 1993 non-retroactively, but Life + 50 years for computer programs [Life + 50 years (before the law change on 1 July 1993, applicable for deaths through 1942)]	50 years after performance (performers' rights)	Yes
Syria	Life + 50 years	10 years from production (photographic, fine arts or plastic arts)	
Taiwan (Republic of China)	Life + 50 years (except posthumous works first published 40 to 50 years after death)	50 years from publication (anonymous or pseudonymous work) 50 years from publication; 50 years from creation if unpublished (corporate works; photographic works, audiovisual works, sound recordings, and performances); 10 years from publication (posthumous works first published 40 to 50 years after death)	Yes
Tajikistan	Berne		
Tanzania	Life + 50 years		
Thailand	Life + 50 years	50 years from publication or 50 years from creation if not published within 50 years from creation	
Timor-Leste	Life + 50 years		
Togo	Life + 50 years		
Tonga	Life + 50 years		
Trinidad and Tobago	Life + 50 years		
Tunisia	Life + 50 years	Authors' rights : economic rights: reproduction right; right of adaptation and translation; public performance right; broadcasting right; right of communication to the public by cable or satellite or any other means; right of communication of a broadcast work in a public place.; moral rights: right to claim authorship; right to object modification; right of disclosure; right of withdrawal.; Performers' rights: The law contains no provisions regarding performers.; Broadcasters' rights: The law contains no provisions regarding broadcasters.	
Turkey	Life + 70 years	70 years from publication for work-for-hire	
Turkmenistan	Life + 50 years		
Tuvalu	Life + 50 years		
Uganda	Life + 50 years	50 years from publication (corporate works, anonymous works, and computer programs)	
Ukraine	Life + 70 years [Life + 50 years (1994–2001)]	70 years from publication (anonymous or pseudonymous work); 70 years from publication (published within 30 years from authors' deaths)	Yes
United Arab Emirates	Life + 50 years		
United Kingdom	Life + 70 years If there are multiple authors, life of last surviving author + 70 years For films, life + 70 years for the last to die of: principal director, author of screenplay, author of dialogue, or composer of music specifically created for and used in the film.	70 years if the author is unknown 70 years after release; if not released, 70 years after making (sound recordings). Recordings which entered the public domain prior to 1 January 2013 are not retroactively covered. 50 years from end of calendar year when the broadcast was first made (broadcasts)	Yes
United States	Life + 70 years (works published since 1978 or unpublished works)	95 years from publication or 120 years from creation, whichever is shorter (anonymous works, pseudonymous works, or works made for hire, published since 1978) 95 years from publication for works published 1964–1977; 28 (if copyright not renewed) or 95 years from publication for works published 1931–1963 (copyrights prior to 1931 have expired, not including copyrights on sound recordings fixed prior to 15 February 1972, which are covered under the Music Modernization Act.)	Yes
Universal Copyright Convention minimum terms	Life + 25 years (general works)	25 years from publication (specific works not based on authors' deaths) 10 years (photographic works or to works of applied art)	
Uruguay	Life + 70 years	70 years after the work is made available (anonymous and pseudonymous works) 70 years from publication (collective works)	Yes
Uzbekistan	Life + 70 years		
Vanuatu	Life + 50 years	25 years after the work is made (works of applied art) 50 years after the latest of: the date the work is made, the date the work is made available to the public or the date of first publication (works published anonymously or under a pseudonym, collective works and audiovisual works); 50 years after the death of the last author to die (works of joint authorship)	Yes
Vatican City	Life + 70 years		
Venezuela	Life + 60 years	60 years from publication; 60 years from creation if unpublished (an audiovisual work, a broadcast work or a computer program) 60 years from publication (anonymous or pseudonymous work)	Yes
Vietnam	Berne		
Yemen	Life + 50 years	25 years from the date of production from 1 January of the production year for applied arts and photography. After expiry of copyright, the work "may be announced to be the ownership of the State" (emphasis added).	
Zambia	Life + 50 years		
Zimbabwe	Life + 50 years	50 years from publication (photographs) 50 years from creation (Sound recordings); 50 years from publication (cinematograph films, broadcasts)	Yes

== See also ==
- List of parties to international copyright agreements
- Moral rights
- Copyright of official texts
- Rule of the shorter term
