= List of copyright acts =

This is a list of copyright acts, which are laws enacting the copyright.

== Afghanistan ==
- The law on the support the right of authors, composers, artists and researchers (Copy Right Law) enacted in 2008.

== Argentina ==
- Article 17º Constitution of Argentina, 1853
- National Law 9.141, 1913
- National Law 11.723, 1933

== Australia ==
- Australian Copyright Act 1968

== Austria ==
- Copyright law of Austria
- Urheberrechtsgesetz (Austria), the Copyright Act of Austria

== Azerbaijan ==
- Law on Copyright and Related Rights (Azerbaijan)

== Canada ==
- Copyright Act of Canada

== People's Republic of China ==
- Copyright Law of the PRC

== Croatia ==
- Copyright and Related Rights Act (2021)

== Czech Republic ==
- Copyright Act (Czech Republic).

== Egypt ==
- Copyright law of Egypt

== El Salvador ==
- Copyright law of El Salvador

== European Union ==
- Computer Programs Directive (1991)
- Conditional Access Directive (1998)
- Counterfeit goods regulation (2003)
- Copyright in the Digital Single Market (2019)
- Copyright Duration Directive (1993)
- Copyright Term Directive (2006)
- Database Directive (1996)
- Enforcement Directive (2004)
- Electronic Commerce Directive 2000 (2000)
- Information Society Directive (2001)
- Resale Rights Directive (2001)
- Re-use of public sector information directive (2003)
- Rental Directive (1992)
- Satellite and Cable Directive (1993)

== Finland ==
- Copyright in Finland
- Copyright Act (Finland)
- Lex Karpela, the 2005 amendment to the Finnish Copyright Act and Criminal Code

== France ==
- Code de la propriété intellectuelle, Intellectual Property Code
- DADVSI, law on authors' rights and related rights in the information society
- HADOPI law, law promoting the distribution and protection of creative works on the internet

== Germany ==
- Urheberrechtsgesetz, the Copyright Act of Germany

== Greece ==
- Copyright law of Greece

== Hong Kong ==
- Copyright Act 1956 (UK legislation, applies to works made before 27 July 1997)
- Copyright Ordinance 1997 (applies to works made after 27 July 1997)

== India ==
- The Copyright Act, 1957

== Iran ==
- Copyright Act (Iran)
- Act for Protection of Authors, Composers and Artists Rights

== Ireland ==
- Copyright and Related Rights Act

== Japan ==
- Copyright Act (Japan)

== Jordan ==
- Copyright Act (Jordan)

== Malaysia ==
- Copyright law of Malaysia

== Nepal ==
- The Copyright Act, 2022 (1965)
- The Copyright Act, 2059 (2002), current copyright law of Nepal
  - Some Nepal Acts relating to Export and Import and Intellectual Property Act, 2063 (2006)

== Netherlands ==
- Auteurswet

== New Zealand ==
- Copyright Act 1994

== Pakistan ==
- Copyright legislation in Pakistan

== Philippines ==
- Intellectual Property Code of the Philippines

== Poland ==
- Copyright Act (Poland)

== Russia ==
- Part IV of the Civil Code of Russia

== Slovakia ==
- Copyright Act (Slovakia)

== Singapore ==
- Copyright Act (Singapore) 2014

== Serbia ==
- The Law on Copyright and Related Rights (Serbia)

== South Africa ==
- Copyright Act, 1978
  - Copyright Amendment Act, 1983
  - Copyright Amendment Act, 1984
  - Copyright Amendment Act, 1986
  - Copyright Amendment Act, 1988
  - Copyright Amendment Act, 1989
  - Copyright Amendment Act, 1992
  - Intellectual Property Laws Amendment Act, 1997
  - Copyright Amendment Act, 2002

== Spain ==
- Ley de Propriedad Intelectual

== Suriname ==
- Law of 22 March 1913 laying down new rules on Copyright (G.B. 1913 No. 15), as it stands after the amendments thereto in G.B. 1915 No. 78, G.B. 1946 No. 2, G.B. 1946 No. 77, G.B. 1959 No. 76, S.B. 1980 No. 116, S.B. 23, 1981.

== Switzerland ==
- Urheberrechtsgesetz (Switzerland), the Copyright Act of Switzerland

== Tajikistan ==
- Law on Copyright and Related rights of Republic of Tajikistan

== Thailand ==
- Copyright law of Thailand

== Turkey ==
- Law on Intellectual and Artistic Works

23, 1933

== Ukraine ==
- Law of Ukraine No. 3792-XII, on Copyright and Related Rights (1993)
- Law of Ukraine No. 2811-IX, on Copyright and Related Rights (2022)

== United Kingdom ==
- Statute of Anne or Copyright Act 1710 (8 Ann. c. 21), the first copyright act of the United Kingdom
- The Copyright Acts 1734 to 1888 is the collective title of the following acts:
  - The Engraving Copyright Act 1734 (8 Geo. 2. c. 13)
  - The Engraving Copyright Act 1766 (7 Geo. 3. c. 38)
  - The Copyright Act 1775 (15 Geo. 3. c. 53)
  - The Prints Copyright Act 1777 (17 Geo. 3. c. 57)
  - The Sculpture Copyright Act 1814 (54 Geo. 3. c. 56)
  - The Dramatic Copyright Act 1833 (3 & 4 Will. 4. c. 15)
  - The Lectures Copyright Act 1835 (5 & 6 Will. 4. c. 65)
  - The Prints and Engravings Copyright (Ireland) Act 1836 (6 & 7 Will. 4. c. 59)
  - The Copyright Act 1836 (6 & 7 Will. 4. c. 110)
  - The Copyright Act 1842 (5 & 6 Vict. c. 45)
  - The Colonial Copyright Act 1847 (10 & 11 Vict. c. 95)
  - The Fine Arts Copyright Act 1862 (25 & 26 Vict. c. 68)
  - The Copyright (Musical Compositions) Act 1882 (45 & 46 Vict. c. 40)
  - The Copyright (Musical Compositions) Act 1888 (51 & 52 Vict. c. 17)
- Copyright Act 1911 (1 & 2 Geo. 5. c. 46)
- Copyright Act 1956 (4 & 5 Eliz. 2. c. 52)
- Copyright, Designs and Patents Act 1988 (c. 48), current copyright law of the United Kingdom

== United States ==
- Copyright Act of 1790
- International Copyright Act of 1891
- Copyright Act of 1909
- Copyright Act of 1976
- Digital Millennium Copyright Act

== See also ==
- Copyright law
- List of copyright case law
- List of countries' copyright length
- List of countries' copyright length based on publication and creation dates
