= Veeck v. Southern Building Code Congress Int'l =

2002 U.S. court case

- Court: United States Court of Appeals for the Fifth Circuit
- Full case name: Peter Veeck, doing business as RegionalWeb v. Southern Building Code Congress International
- Decided: June 7, 2002
- Citations: Panel opinion: 241 F.3d 398; En banc opinion: 293 F.3d 791

Case history
- Prior history: 49 F. Supp. 2d 885 (E.D. Tex. 1999)

Court membership
- Judges sitting: Panel: Jacques L. Wiener Jr., Carl E. Stewart, F.A. Little, Jr. (W.D. La.); En banc: Carolyn Dineen King, E. Grady Jolly, Patrick Higginbotham, W. Eugene Davis, Edith H. Jones, Jerry Edwin Smith, Wiener, Rhesa Barksdale, Emilio M. Garza, Harold R. DeMoss Jr., Fortunato Benavides, Stewart, Robert Manley Parker, James L. Dennis, Edith Brown Clement

Case opinions
- Majority: Panel: Wiener, joined by Stewart
- Majority: En banc: Jones, joined by Jolly, Smith, Barksdale, Garza, DeMoss, Benavides, Parker, Clement
- Dissent: Panel: Little
- Dissent: En banc: Higginbotham, joined by King, Davis, Stewart
- Dissent: En banc: Wiener, joined by King, Davis, Higginbotham, Stewart, Dennis

Laws applied
- Copyright Act of 1976

Veeck v. Southern Bldg. Code Congress Int'l, Inc., 293 F.3d 791 (5th Cir. 2002) (en banc), was a 2002 en banc 9-6 decision of the United States Court of Appeals for the Fifth Circuit, about the scope of copyright protection for building codes and by implication other privately drafted laws adopted by states and municipal governments. A three-fifths majority of the court's fifteen judges held that copyright protection no longer applied to model codes once they were enacted into law.

== Background ==
=== Factual context ===
The Southern Building Code Congress International (SBCCI) published a standard building code that it proposed as a model code for municipalities. It encourages local government entities to enact its codes into law by reference, without cost to them. The towns of Anna and Savoy in North Texas adopted the SBCCI code as law. Peter Veeck operates a website that provides free access via the Internet to information about the area of Texas north of Dallas, including some of the area's municipal codes and ordinances. He learned that Anna and Savoy had adopted the SBCCI code and went to those towns to obtain copies of the code, but was unsuccessful. He then bought electronic copies of the codes from SBCCI. Despite the fact that the codes contained a copyright notice and warnings against copying, Veeck uploaded the codes on his website. SBCCI demanded that Veeck cease and desist from infringing its copyrights. In response, Veeck filed a declaratory judgment action seeking a ruling that he did not violate the Copyright Act. SBCCI counterclaimed for copyright infringement and other allegedly wrongful acts.

=== District court ruling ===
The facts were not disputed and each party moved for summary judgment on the copyright infringement issue. The district court granted summary judgment in SBCCI's favor.

The district court began by considering the Supreme Court's 1888 decision in Banks v. Manchester, which held that judicial opinions are not subject to copyright protection. Banks in turn rests upon two grounds neither of which, the district court said, would justify invalidation of SBCCI's copyright protection:

1. the public owns the opinions because it pays the judge's salaries, and
2. as a matter of public policy, the whole work done by the judges constitutes the "authentic exposition and interpretation of the law," which, binds every citizen and therefore "is free for publication to all."

These considerations do not apply here, the district court maintained, because "SBCCI is a private non-profit corporation which carries out research, compiles data, drafts standardized codes, and then prints them in a usable fashion for its customers," without payment from the public. Without copyright protection, organizations like SDCCI would be unable to continue their work. While Veeck argues that it is necessary to publish codes on the Internet to provide the public with its due process right to free access to the law, he is wrong. The fact that he purchased the codes by just ordering and paying for them shows that the public can do the same. Therefore, the court said, "Banks is clearly distinguishable to the present case or scenario as stated above. Accordingly, the Court finds that SBCCI's works should be afforded their copyright protection."

The district court entered a permanent injunction and ordered an award of monetary damages. An appeal followed.

=== The vacated panel decision ===
Initially, a three-judge panel of the Fifth Circuit affirmed, but its decision was vacated and the case was set for rehearing en banc. The panel concluded (a) the incentive of copyright was needed to continue production of these useful model codes; (b) there was no evidence that Veeck had been denied access to the town building codes; and (c) there was no merger of idea and expression because "contrary to Veeck's insistence—there remain many ways to write model building codes, not just one."

== Ruling of the Fifth Circuit ==
=== Majority opinion ===
Judge Edith Jones began her opinion for the nine-judge majority with this summary:

The issue in this en banc case is the extent to which a private organization may assert copyright protection for its model codes, after the models have been adopted by a legislative body and become "the law". Specifically, may a code-writing organization prevent a website operator from posting the text of a model code where the code is identified simply as the building code of a city that enacted the model code as law? Our short answer is that as law, the model codes enter the public domain and are not subject to the copyright holder's exclusive prerogatives.

==== The law is excluded from copyright ====
The court traced the early case law. In 1834, the Supreme Court interpreted the first federal copyright laws and unanimously held that "no reporter has or can have any copyright in the written opinions delivered by this Court ..." The case involved a copyright infringement suit between early reporters of U.S. Supreme Court opinions, both of whom were selling editions of their reports. Peters, who had replaced Wheaton, the reporter from 1816 to 1827, decided to market a less expensive product in which he omitted Wheaton's annotations and summaries but copied the texts of the Supreme Court's opinions, both those preceding his term as reporter and those he reported himself. Wheaton found his market dried up and sued Peters for infringement. Wheaton lost in the trial court and appealed to the Supreme Court, which affirmed the judgment. The Court's opinion concluded: "It may be proper to remark that the Court is unanimously of opinion that no reporter has or can have any copyright in the written opinions delivered by this Court, and that the judges thereof cannot confer on any reporter any such right." Thus, any copyright protection for publications of judicial opinions could cover only the added materials such as summaries of the opinions and commentaries on them, but not the judicially authored texts of the opinions themselves. Counsel for both parties in the case agreed that statutes could not be copyrighted.

In 1888, the Supreme Court extended the rule of Wheaton v. Peters to state court opinions, saying that the law " is free for publication to all." State courts made similar rulings for their courts and laws.

SBCCI argues that the Banks case explains the rule on two grounds, both of which (SBCCI argues) are inapplicable here. First, Banks is said to deny copyright to judicial opinions because judges, whose salaries are paid by the government, cannot claim to own the opinions. Also, they do not need copyright incentives to write opinions. In contrast, SBCCI is unlike government employees, it says, and as the private "author" of model codes it allegedly depends on copyright incentives in order to perform their public service. Second, SBCCI argues that Banks in effect says that due process requires adequate public access to the law, but that argument does not apply because there is adequate public access to its building codes.

The court disagreed that this is a proper reading of Banks. Rather, "Banks declares at the outset of its discussion that copyright law in the United States is purely a matter of statutory construction." Then the Supreme Court denies that judges are the authors or proprietors of their opinions. What their work is " constitutes the authentic exposition and interpretation of the law, which, binding every citizen, is free for publication to all." In effect, judicial writings are works for hire that belong to the public that pays judges' salaries.

Banks, read together with Wheaton, on which it relies, stands for the rule that the law "is not subject to copyright." The law is not simply what a law-proposing body such as SBCCI offers to the legislature:

Lawmaking bodies in this country enact rules and regulations only with the consent of the governed. The very process of lawmaking demands and incorporates contributions by "the people," in an infinite variety of individual and organizational capacities. Even when a governmental body consciously decides to enact proposed model building codes, it does so based on various legislative considerations, the sum of which produce its version of "the law." In performing their function, the lawmakers represent the public will, and the public are the final "authors" of the law.

SBCCI is wrong about access, too, the court maintained. That law is in the public domain means that it is there "for whatever use the citizens choose to make of it. Citizens may reproduce copies of the law for many purposes, not only to guide their actions but to influence future legislation, educate their neighborhood association, or simply to amuse." The public's rights cannot be reconciled with "the statutory right of a copyright holder to exclude his work from any publication or dissemination." SBCCI responds that "the fair use doctrine as well as its honorable intentions will prevent abuse. Free availability of the law, by this logic, has degenerated into availability as long as SBCCI chooses not to file suit." The court said it rejected that: "Instead, we read Banks, Wheaton, and related cases consistently to enunciate the principle that the law," whether it has its source in judicial opinions or statutes, ordinances or regulations, is not subject to federal copyright law."

In deciding that the municipal building codes in this case could be freely copied, the court relied on the First Circuit's decision in Building Officials & Code Administrators v. Code Technology, Inc., (BOCA)—the only other appellate case addressing a similar enactment of a model building code. The court distinguished cases from the Ninth and Second Circuits holding that government reference to (not copying or enactment of) a preexisting private system for identifying medical conditions and a listing of valuations for used cars did not eliminate the copyright owners' rights to prevent others from making copies of the material.

==== Effect of copyright statute ====
Under the copyright statute, facts are unprotectable. Moreover, there is a merger of idea and expression once a model building code is enacted into positive law. Because there is only one way to express the meaning of the building codes, the idea embodied in the law merges with SBCCI's expression, and at that point, renders copyright protection unavailable. Under the Supreme Court's Feist decision, facts "may not be copyrighted and are part of the public domain available to every person." SBCCI argues that this "ignores the goal of fostering competition in creativity." It also argues that no merger occurs here "because there are many possible ways to express model codes: both the multiplicity of building standards and the variety of ways to express those standards compel the conclusion that the ideas have not merged with their expression." The court replied that the argument misses the point: Once the law is enacted, it cannot be expressed authoritatively any way except verbatim.

The court also rejected the "takings" argument: "This is not, however, a 'takings' case, not least because SBCCI urged localities to adopt its model codes. The issue in the case is . . . the legal consequences flowing from the permission that SBCCI gave."

==== Model codes versus standards ====
Several standard-setting organizations filed amicus curiae briefs "out of fear that their copyrights may be vitiated simply by the common practice of governmental entities' incorporating their standards in laws and regulations." The court sought to reassure them:

This case does not involve references to extrinsic standards. Instead, it concerns the wholesale adoption of a model code promoted by its author, SBCCI, precisely for use as legislation. Caselaw that derives from official incorporation of extrinsic standards is distinguishable in reasoning and result.

The court pointed out that such organizations as the American Medical Association that had promulgated standards that government agencies later referred to in regulations had not:

solicited incorporation of their standards by legislators or regulators. In the case of a model code, on the other hand, the text of the model serves no other purpose than to become law. SBCCI operates with the sole motive and purpose of creating codes that will become obligatory in law.

==== Other policy arguments ====
SBCCI pleaded that

without full copyright protection for model codes, despite their enactment as the law in hundreds or thousands of jurisdictions, SBCCI will lack the revenue to continue its public service of code drafting. Thus SBCCI needs copyright's economic incentives.

The court had several responses. First, it did not believe SBCCI, since it "has survived and grown over 60 years" without court copyright protection. Second, "the most fruitful approach for the public entities and the potentially regulated industries lies in mutual cooperation. The self-interest of the builders, engineers, designers and other relevant tradesmen should also not be overlooked in the calculus." Third:

[I]f SBCCI wants to enhance the market value of its model codes, SBCCI could easily publish them as do the compilers of statutes and judicial opinions, with "value-added" in the form of commentary, questions and answers, lists of adopting jurisdictions and other information valuable to a reader. The organization could also charge fees for the massive amount of interpretive information about the codes that it doles out.

The court therefore reversed the judgment against Veeck and instructed dismissal of the complaint.

=== Dissenting opinions ===
There were two dissenting opinions, one for four of the six dissenting judges, another for all six of them. The four-judge opinion argued that it should be left to Congress to decide whether such subject matter should be excluded from copyright protection. They would have decided the case on contract grounds—that Veeck breached the license terms against copying and distribution of the code.

The dissenting opinion in which all six dissenters joined would have found copyright infringement. In their view the Supreme Court precedents applied only to judicial opinions. The dissent regarded the majority's policy claims as mere "feel-good" and "symbolic" rhetoric, not supportable, precedent-based substantive law. The public benefits, they claimed, by delegating the code-drafting process to such organizations as SBCCI, for they can provide the service at a lower cost and in a more efficient and expert manner; however, these organizations need copyright protection to subsidize their public-service activity.

== Attempted appeal to Supreme Court ==
SBCCI petitioned for certiorari but it was denied. Before ruling the Court called for the views of the Solicitor General, who filed an amicus curiae brief recommending denial of certiorari. The government said:

The court of appeals' holding that such a code may be copied by interested members of the public is correct, it is consistent with the views of the only other court of appeals to address the same issue, and it does not conflict with any decision of any other court of appeals.

== Rulings in other circuits and subsequent developments ==
It is well established that judicial opinions are not protectable by copyright. There is a division of authority, however, on whether to follow the Veeck case as to municipal building codes.

=== Seventh Circuit ===
In International Code Council, Inc. v. National Fire Code Protection Ass'n, Inc., one company engaged in the business of promoting building codes sued another such company for copyright infringement. The Illinois district court interpreted Veeck to hold that it is the enactment of a model code into law that makes the code unprotectable under copyright law rather than inevitable lack of expression. The court did not reach a conclusive result, however, when the parties cross-moved for summary judgment. Among other things, the court held: "Defendant has not shown that the disputed provisions of Plaintiff's model building code are not copyrightable as a matter of law."

In Atlantic Woodland Corp. v. DRH Cambridge Homes, Inc., the court considered a copyright infringement action for copying village development plans that had been accepted as part of an agreement to annex the area, so that the plans became required by law and fell into the public domain. The court held those such facts, if proved, would provide a complete defense, and it therefore denied a motion to dismiss the defense.

=== Ninth Circuit ===
On the other hand, in Practice Mgmt. Info. Corp. v. American Med. Ass'n, the Ninth Circuit held that incorporation of a classification system (taxonomy) for medical procedures in Medicare and Medicaid regulations does not make them unprotectable under copyright law. However, the court limited the ability of the AMA to enforce its copyright against a health maintenance organization that used the taxonomy in order to comply with federal law requiring it. The court viewed such copyright enforcement as copyright misuse – an inequitable extension of the copyright owner's otherwise lawful monopoly. The Ninth Circuit also considered improper a bargain that the AMA had made with the Health Care Financing Administration (HCFA), in which AMA licensed the agency to use its copyrighted taxonomy on a royalty-free basis "in exchange for HCFA's agreement not to use a competing coding system."

=== Second Circuit ===
And in CCC Info. Servs., Inc. v. Maclean Hunter Mkt. Reports, Inc., the Second Circuit held that incorporation of used-car valuations in insurance statutes and regulations does not make them unprotectable by copyright.

=== First Circuit ===
In John G. Danielson, Inc. v. Winchester-Conant Props., Inc., the First Circuit declined to follow Veeck. A real estate developer had acquired a parcel of land covered by a 30-year restrictive covenant to which a previous owner had agreed. The covenant required that any residential development conform with site plan drawings submitted by the previous owner. The new owner tried to modify these restrictions; when it failed to do so it built a condominium subdivision that adhered to the site plans in the covenant. The architectural firm that had earlier designed those plans then sued for copyright infringement, and eventually won a jury verdict and a judgment in the district court for over $1.3 million—essentially all the profits made from the now-complete condominium project. The district court dismissed the affirmative defense based on Veeck. The defendant corporation that had built the condominium subdivision appealed. On appeal, the First Circuit held that the covenant and its drawings were not equivalent to the village zoning law nor was the village's vote to approve the restrictive covenant, incorporating by reference the drawings; it therefore held Veeck inapplicable and affirmed the judgment.

In an earlier First Circuit case, however, Building Officials & Code Adm'rs v. Code Tech., Inc., the court had denied copyright protection in a building code that a private organization drafted, because the court thought the group did not need a copyright incentive to draft the code and because the court saw potentially serious due process concerns with access to the code if the copyright was enforceable.

=== Federal Circuit patent case ===
In State Street Bank & Trust Co. v. Signature Financial Group, Inc., the Federal Circuit upheld the validity of a patent that effectively covered a section of the Internal Revenue Code and its regulations. In its 1998 State Street Bank opinion, the Federal Circuit upheld U.S. Patent No. 5,193,056, entitled "Data Processing System for Hub and Spoke Financial Services Configuration," because it "produced 'a useful, concrete and tangible result'—a final share price momentarily fixed for recording and reporting purposes and even accepted and relied upon by regulatory authorities and in subsequent trades." As shown in the Wikipedia article on the case, a chart is shown that illustrates how the wording of the patent claim corresponds to the US tax statute and regulations, so that the patent is thus, in effect, one on compliance with US tax law by using a computer (which is the only feasible way to comply with the law).

In In re Bilski, however, the Federal Circuit decided that the State Street Bank test "is insufficient to determine whether a claim is patent-eligible under § 101," and "is inadequate," so that it "should not longer be relied on." On the appeal of Bilski to the Supreme Court, a concurring opinion by Justice Breyer stated that the members of the Court were unanimous that State Street was not the law.

== Commentary ==
Many academic commentators support the Fifth Circuit's approach in Veeck as advancing the public interest but some criticize it as a derogation of creators' rights and as disincentivizing.

=== Cunningham ===
Lawrence A. Cunningham, compared the three Veeck opinions—the Jones majority opinion, the Higginbotham dissent, and the "blistering" Weiner dissent. Cunningham saw Higginbotham's dissenting opinion as the one of the three opinions that "most resonates in expressing the federal judiciary's inherent limitations in addressing such a sprawling public policy issue." In his view: "Cases and controversies federal courts resolve are not suitable forums to provide optimal solutions to the problems of private standards embodied in public law. Such a framework must be provided by a more elaborate policy-oriented process." Cunningham suggests that when government endorsement abrogates copyright, as Veeck holds, perhaps that is a "taking" that the Constitution insists be based on procedural due process and adequate compensation.

=== Ghosh ===
Shubha Ghosh questions the viability of a market-oriented approach in which it is assumed "that citizens do have access because either the market will provide the code to public entities, who make the decisions about access to citizens, or the market will provide to those who can pay." He argues:

But by turning the drafting process into a market, one potentially turns a democratic process into a discrete transaction between a demander of laws (the legislature) and a supplier of laws (the drafting organization). Furthermore, the financing of law making through public means also undermines democratic values. In most private code drafting cases, the organization allows the state to use the model code without charge. The organization finances its enterprise through sales of the draft code to libraries, law firms, and other interested parties. In other words, general tax revenues are not used to fund law making. To the extent that tax revenues serve to maintain government accountability, the power over the purse strings is lost in the process.

Ghosh considers unworkable the majority compromise in which the black-letter text of the code is not subject to copyright while the notes and comments are subject. He argues that the text often cannot be understood properly without recourse to the notes and comments, because of "the interdependence between enacted code and notes, both for interpretation purposes and in the enactment process." He points to alternative incentivization means: "professionals in the fields affected by particular standards and codes may have ample incentive to continue to buy the official sets of standards notwithstanding the potential availability of other, unofficial editions."

=== Karjala ===
Dennis Karjala sees building codes as functional works designed to regulate how buildings are built:

The case against copyright protection for privately drafted model codes is . . . quite strong, on both public policy and traditional copyright grounds. The initial panel decision and the en banc dissent in Veeck, however, as well as the cases on which they rely, show the power of the "restitutionary impulse" in the judiciary and courts' willingness to fill apparent gaps in protection by expanding copyright coverage. Even the en banc majority in Veeck was unable to craft an opinion that would treat model codes as what the opinion expressly recognizes them to be-if not as directly functional works, then as works that are designed and intended to be used as functional tools for regulating various forms of human behavior through enactment into law.

=== Hardy ===
Trotter Hardy views Veeck as an example of eminent domain without compensation: "In other words, we have a case of some governmental body taking action to turn what was otherwise an item of private property into a public one, for sound reasons of public benefit." But the "taking" is without compensation under the Fifth Amendment's requirements for "due process" and "just compensation." Moreover, Veeck does not openly "take" the property. Instead, it determines that "if the government has a need for the use of . . . private property, then the property must no longer be 'property' at all." Hardy argues that if a building code is original and expressive enough to gain copyright in the first place, the legislative act of making it a law does not change those facts to turn it into non-property.

=== McJohn ===
Stephen McJohn argues that the Veeck court's use of the merger doctrine to resolve the case "is a blunt instrument because it entails holding that the model code loses all copyright protection once adopted." That would permit not only nonprofit uses but also copying and use "for strictly commercial purposes." In contrast, application of the doctrine of "fair use would permit a more nuanced approach." Moreover, the fair use doctrine "can be used to authorize free expression without the doctrinal problems of the merger doctrine."

=== Hughes ===
Justin Hughes also argues for use of an alternative doctrine. He maintains that implied license is a better tool than the fair use doctrine or merger doctrine in cases such as Veeck. The problem Hughes sees with fair use is that the fourth statutory fair use factor—effect on the plaintiff's market—has become dominant. That would tend to outlaw wholesale copying as occurred in Veeck. "In contrast, the implied license doctrine may both cover the most important created fact cases and prompt a certain amount of self-selection on the question of copyright incentives." Hughes argues that the facts of such cases typically support an implied license rationale: "once the model code is written, the professional association effectively 'hands it over' to the government knowing that the government will reproduce and distribute the expression. In the case law, these are paradigmatic indicators of an implied license."

Hughes proposes that the scope of the implied license should be "determined by considering the reasonable expectations of the parties in view of all of the circumstances, including the parties' conduct." He concludes that the merger doctrine does not need to be abandoned in this field, especially where the circumstances are such that the subject matter "would be created even if the creator knew that the results would not be protectable under copyright." But in cases where the "elimination of copyright's incentive for yet-to-be-created expressions . . . would prevent [them] from ever coming into existence," merger should give way to sharing under what amounts to a compulsory license. This would preserve the incentive policies of copyright law and the public policy underlying the merger doctrine. "Instead of doctrine-distorting machinations to withhold application of the merger doctrine, we should apply it in a sensible way that does not destroy the future flow of both expressions of facts and the facts themselves."

=== Samuelson ===
Pamela Samuelson sees "perverse incentives" in permitting copyright protection on model codes, saying the Veeck case illustrates the temptation created:

Under the deal SBCCI offered, local governments such as those in Anna and Savoy got royalty-free rights to use the code and one or more copies to make available in a public office. 20 8 But SBCCI charged a substantial fee to anyone else who wanted a copy of the code or access to it, and got referrals from building inspectors and other public officials, making public employees into a kind of free sales force for SBCCI. The perverse incentives problem is of particular concern because of the increasing frequency with which governments are actively encouraging government adoption of privately drafted industry standards.

Samuelson questions whether organizations need copyright incentives to develop and maintain industry standards and codes that they promulgate and whether arguments based on incentives should prevail over other considerations. She maintains that they generally have ample incentives to develop them for use by professionals in their fields and that "it is simply not credible to claim that organizations . . . would stop developing [them] without copyright protection."

=== Sibley ===
Jessica Sibley takes issue with the Fifth Circuit majority's "unfair" assertion—"The citizens are the authors of the law, and therefore its owners, regardless of who actually drafts the provisions, because the law derives its authority from the consent of the public, expressed through the democratic process." She dismisses this as power to the people rhetoric and mythology used as an excuse for expropriation of the property rights of SBCCI:

This political origin story justifies the redistribution of property from private sweat and equity to "the people" who are thereby enriched (albeit via an enrichment of the public domain) with the casting of a ballot. The authenticity and authority of the expression-the model code cum law derives not from the labor that made it, but the power and force (and myth) of the people speaking their desire as one. The origin here is not the source of the model code but the source of the law, the people who invent themselves through consensual self-government.

== See also ==
- Copyright of official texts, worldwide and under the Berne Convention
- Edict of government, the legal principle involved in the case
- Georgia v. Public.Resource.Org, Inc.
