= Copyright law of Oman =

Copyright in Oman is regulated by the Law for the Protection of Copyright and Neighbouring Rights issued by Royal Decree No 65/2008 which was later amended by Royal Decree No 132/2008.

== History ==
The first copyright law in Oman was passed in the year 1996 by Royal Decree No 47/1996, this law was later revamped in anticipation of Oman's membership to the WTO in 2000 when Royal Decree No 37/2000 issued the second copyright law of Oman, and then in fulfilment of Oman's prerequisites to the entry into a Free Trade Agreement with the U.S., Royal Decree No 65/2008 issued the third and current Omani copyright law.

== Copyright protection ==
The Omani copyright protects any original literary, artistic, and scientific work automatically upon their creation without the need to undertake any formalities irrespective of the value, kind, method of expression, or purpose for which the work was created.

=== Subject matter of copyright protection ===
Article 2 of the Omani copyright law provides a wide definition of what can fall within the scope of copyright protection as it states that literary, artistic, and scientific works are protected irrespective of their value, kind, medium of expression, or purpose for creation. The same article provides an illustrative non-exhaustive list of subject matter explicitly included within the scope of protection that includes all forms of literary and artistic work in addition to computer software and databases. Article 2 also specifies that the 'title' of a work can attract copyright protection this title is original.

Article 4 of the law provides that the following are not to be protected by copyright:

- Mere ideas, procedures and methods for doing business, mathematical equations and principles, discoveries, and data.
- Official documents such as laws, regulations, decisions, international treaties and agreements, judicial decisions, arbitral decisions, decisions made by administrative bodies with judicial functions, and official translation of such documents.
- Daily news and current events which are mere items of press information.

=== Economic rights ===
The Omani law grants the owner of the copyright over a work the following exclusive economic rights:

- The right to reproduce the work.
- The right to translate the work, create adaptions of it, rearrange it musically, or modify it into another form.
- The right to sell the work or any of its copies to the public or deal with it in any title-transferring dealing.
- The right to rent the work for a commercial purpose.
- The right to perform the work to the public.
- The right to communicate the work to the public.
- The right to broadcast the work.

=== Moral rights ===
Moral rights under the Omani copyright law cannot be waived or disposed of. The moral rights available under Omani law are the right of the author for attribution as the author of the work in the manner of his choice and the right of the author to object to any distortion, mutilation, modification, or other derogatory action in relation to his work that could prejudice the author's honor or reputation.

=== Free uses ===
The Omani copyright law provides a number of exceptions that allow the public to perform the following acts in relation to any copyright work without the need to seek the permission of the copyright owner as long as the author is attributed, the use does not conflict with the normal exhaustion of the work, and the use does not unreasonably detriment the interests of the author:

1. Reproducing segments of the work for illustration, review, or criticism.
2. Using the work at gathering within the family domain.
3. Using the work for nonprofit educational purposes for students in the classroom.
4. Reproducing one copy of the work by libraries or other nonprofit organizations to provide a person with a copy for research or to create an archival copy of the work.
5. Reproducing, broadcasting, or communicating to the public segments of daily news by the press.
6. Reproducing one copy of a software program to enable the proper use of the software, create a backup copy, or to adapt the software to work on a specific computer.
7. Performing the work in public at religious ceremonies.
8. Performing the work for nonprofit face-to-face teaching in the classroom.
9. Creating temporary copies of the work by broadcasting agencies to use in its programs.

=== Duration of copyright protection ===
The duration of the copyright term in Oman can be summarized in the following table:

Work	Duration
Any work other than audio-visual, collective, applied art works made by a single known author	The lifetime of the author plus 70 years starting from the beginning of the year following the death of the author
Any work other than audio-visual, collective, applied art works made by more than one author	The lifetime of all the authors plus 70 years starting from the beginning of the year following the death of the last surviving author
Published work other than audio-visual, collective, applied art works made by an anonymous author	90 years from the beginning of the year following the publication of the work
Unpublished work other than audio-visual, collective, applied art works made by an anonymous author	120 years from the beginning of the year following the completion of the work
Published audio-visual, collective, applied art works	90 years from the beginning of the year following the publication of the work
Unpublished audio-visual and collective, applied art works	120 years from the beginning of the year following the completion of the work

A work is considered unpublished under the Omani copyright law if it does not get published within 25 years from the date of creation of the work.

== Neighboring rights ==
In addition to copyright protection, the Omani copyright law provides additional protection for performances, sound recordings, and broadcasts.

=== Performers' rights ===
Performances have the following exclusive economic rights:

1. Broadcasting and communicating to the public their unfixed performance.
2. Fixing their performance in any form.
3. Exploiting the unfixed performance in any way.
4. Making available to the public reproductions of the fixed performance.
5. Renting reproductions of the fixed performance for commercial purposes.
6. Broadcasting and communicating to the public the fixed performance.
7. Reproducing the fixed performance.

The duration of the economic rights of performers lasts for 95 years starting from the year following the publication of the fixed performance, or 120 years starting from the year following the completion of the performance if the performance is not published within 25 years after its creation.

In addition to these economic rights, performers have moral rights identical to those of copyright owners which cannot be waived, are perpetual, and are independent of the economic rights.

=== Sound recordings producers' rights ===
Producers of sound recordings have the following exclusive economic rights:

1. Exploiting their sound recordings in any way including reproduction and rental.
2. Making the sound recordings available to the public.
3. Broadcasting and communicating the public their sound recordings.

The duration of the economic rights of the producers of sound recordings lasts for 95 years starting from the year following the publication of the sound recording, or 120 years starting from the year following the completion of the sound recording if the sound recording is not published within 25 years after its creation.

=== Broadcasters' rights ===
Broadcasting authorities have the following exclusive economic rights:

1. Fixing, reproducing, broadcasting, re-broadcasting, and communicating to the public the broadcasting programs.
2. Communicating to the public the televised recording of its programs without prior written license.
3. Recording, reproducing, renting, re-broadcasting, making available to the public, and communicating to the public.

The duration of the economic rights of broadcasters lasts for 20 years from the year following the year of the first broadcast of a broadcasting program.

== Effective technological measures and rights management information ==
In addition to copyright protection, the Omani copyright law also protects effective technical measures and rights management information applied to copyright works by prohibiting the following:

1. Circumventing any effective technological measure.
2. Dealing with any means, products, or components used for circumventing effective technological measures.
3. Removing or altering rights management information, distributing this info with the knowledge of its alteration, and distributing copies of any work for which rights management information has been altered or removed.
4. Dealing with any system or mechanism for decoding an encrypted program-carrying satellite signal.
5. Receiving or distributing an illegally decoded program-carrying satellite signal.

== Oman's membership of international copyright treaties ==
Oman is a member of the following copyright treaties:

- Berne Convention for the Protection of Literary and Artistic Works
- WIPO Copyright Treaty
- WIPO Performances and Phonograms Treaty
