= Copyright law of Indonesia =

Copyright law and status applicable in Indonesia

Copyright law of Indonesia is set out in the Copyright Act, namely, current, Act No. 28 of 2014. In law, the notion of copyright is "the exclusive rights for the creator or the recipient the right to publish or reproduce the creations or give permission for it by not reducing the restrictions according to the laws and regulations that apply" (Article 1, point 1).

Copyright Act of Indonesia has been amended in 1987, 1997, 2002, and 2014.

== History ==
Indonesia became a colony of the Netherlands on 1 January 1800, when the Dutch state nationalized the Dutch East India Company and took control of its properties in the archipelago. The territory, then known as the Dutch East Indies, had its own copyright law, which was an extension of the Netherlands' own 1912 copyright law. In 1913, the Netherlands became a signatory of the Berne Convention on the protection of original work on behalf of its colonial possessions. Furthermore, it also affirmed the 1928 revision of the convention on behalf of the East Indies in 1931. When Indonesia became a sovereign nation on 27 December 1949, it initially agreed to uphold the treaty as the successor state of the Dutch East Indies. The 1912 copyright law was translated into Indonesian as the law on the "right to a creation" (hak tjipta), despite proposals for a more literal translation of the "right of the author" (hak pengarang).

Antagonism toward the Dutch over the West New Guinea dispute in the 1950s led Indonesia to withdraw from the Berne Convention in 1958. Publicly, the government reasoned that it wanted to be able to copy foreign books freely in the interest of developing education. Because of the dispute, it also sought to distance itself from acts of the colonial government and did not want to be party to the treaty before the country had written its own copyright law. Indonesia's non-invitation as an independent nation during the 1948 revision of the convention in Brussels—after the 1945 declaration of independence but before the 1949 transfer of sovereignty—was also a point of contention. Support for copyright protection in the 1960s and 1970s was limited to lobby groups, such as the Indonesian Publishers Association (Ikatan Penerbit Indonesia). Unauthorized copying became widespread, and, by the 1980s, approximately 70 to 90 percent of the domestic market for books, videotapes, computer software, records, and cassette tapes was dominated by sales of unauthorized copies.

In 1982, the Indonesian government revoked the colonial copyright law and enacted in its place Law No. 6 of 1982 on Copyright. This law was criticized at both national and international levels because of the length of its protection period, shortened from 50 years in the colonial law to only 25 years. Minister of Justice Ali Said, in defending the law, cited the social function of copyright and the need to limit its scope in the public interest. The law included controversial provisions allowing the central government to appropriate a work protected by copyright and publish it "in the national interest" and to assume ownership over folkloristic material when working with foreigners. It also did not cover computer software and afforded weak protections for foreign rights holders.

The first amendment to the law, enacted in 1987, removed the appropriation provision and extended the period of copyright for most works to either 50 years after first publication or life of the author plus 50 years. For photographic works, computer programs, and compilations, the protection period remained at 25 years after first publication. The amendment also included a provision stating that foreign works would only be protected on first publication in Indonesia. This provision, however, did not apply to works originating from countries with which Indonesia had a standalone copyright agreement or countries who are co-signatories with Indonesia on an international copyright agreement. Indonesia signed such agreements with the European Economic Community in 1988 and with the United States in 1989.

In 1994, Indonesia ratified the Agreement on Trade-Related Aspects of Intellectual Property Rights establishing the World Trade Organization. It rejoined the Berne Convention in 1997 and was the first nation to ratify the World Intellectual Property Organization Copyright Treaty that same year. The 1982 copyright law was further amended in 1997 to redefine the terms "publication" and "reproduction". It also introduced rental rights for films, computer programs, and sound recordings, included computer programs among the literary works, and expanded the definition of compilations to include "other works resulting from transformations".

The 1982 copyright law was replaced by Law No. 19 of 2002, which went into effect in 2003. By consolidating the 1982 law and subsequent amendments, the law aimed "to foster the development of works that result from the diversity of art and culture" in Indonesia. The law clarified the status of copyright and neighboring rights, which had been confusing in prior legislations, and prohibited parallel importation. It also imposed fines and prison terms for copyright violations, but lax enforcement resulted in the United States placing Indonesia on a priority watch list in 2007 for failing to protect intellectual property rights.

A new copyright law was enacted in September 2014, raising the protection period for the classical categories of works to the life of the author plus 70 years.

== Copyright durations and terms ==
Literary; Musical; Fine art; Architectural works; Work of joint authorship	Lifetime of the author(s) + 70 years.
Work by legal entities; Anonymous works; Photographic works; Cinematographic works; Derived works; Collected works	Date of publication + 50 years.
Applied arts	Date of publication + 25 years.

== Organisations ==
The following organisations are involved in protecting copyright in Indonesia.

- KCI : Karya Cipta Indonesia
- ASIRI : Asosiasi Indrustri Rekaman Indonesia (Association of Recording Industry Indonesia)
- ASPILUKI : Asosiasi Piranti Lunak Indonesia (Software Association of Indonesia)
- APMINDO : Asosiasi Pengusaha Musik Indonesia (Association of Music Indonesia)
- ASIREFI : Asosiasi Rekaman Film Indonesia (Association of Recording Film Indonesia)
- PAPPRI : Persatuan Artis Penata Musik Rekaman Indonesia (United Artists Records Playground Music Indonesia)
- IKAPI : Ikatan Penerbit Indonesia (Association of Indonesian Publishers)
- MPA : Motion Picture Association (Motion Picture Association)
- BSA : Business Software Association

== Notable cases ==
=== Love Light installation ===
The Central Jakarta District Court ruled on April 20, 2021, that the light installation Love Light of the Rabbit Town theme park in Bandung infringed the copyright of Urban Light, a 2008 public art by the late American artist Chris Burden and installed at the Los Angeles County Museum of Art (LACMA). Accordingly, the Rabbit Town artwork, erected in January 2018, "consists of multiple lampposts arranged in symmetric fashion, similar to the arrangement of lampposts in Burden's sculpture." The case had been filed by the estate of the late artist on June 4, 2020. The court ordered the theme park to remove the installation and to pay Rp1,000,000,000 (equivalent to US$69,000) to the estate of Burden.
