= Copyright law of Egypt =

Applicable legislation in Egypt with regard to copyright

Law on the Protection of Intellectual Property Rights

Hosni Mubarak
- Citation: Law No. 82 of 2002
- Enacted by: Hosni Mubarak
- Signed: 2 June 2002
- Commenced: 3 June 2002

Related legislation
- Law No. 354 of 1954 (repealed)

Keywords
- Patents, trademarks, industrial design, copyright, plant variety rights

Egyptian copyright law has evolved over time. The currently applicable legislation in Egypt with regard to copyright is Book Three of the Law on the Protection of Intellectual Property Rights 82 of 2002, which entered into force on 3 June 2002, the day following its publication in the Official Gazette. The implementing decree is Prime Ministerial Decree 497 of 2005 (effective by Issue No. 12, Official Gazette, 29 March 2005).

== Legislative texts ==
Prior to 1954, there was no legislation in Egypt protecting artistic and literary property. Despite the absence of any such legislation, indigenous and mixed courts invoked principles of natural law and justice to protect intellectual property rights. However, indigenous and mixed courts had two different approaches to sanctioning violations. Indigenous courts refused to apply criminal law provisions, on the ground that no criminal responsibility could be determined in the absence of a specific legislative text dealing with artistic and literary property. On the other hand, mixed courts did not wait for implementing regulations to be enacted. In a hearing on 17 February 1941, the Criminal Chamber of Cassation, Mixed Court of Appeal, ruled that performance of a song or musical composition, without the authorization of the author or composer, was considered as an offence punishable under Article 351 of the Penal Law.

=== Law 354 of 1954 ===
Literary and artistic protection were dealt with for the first time by Egyptian law in 1954, with the promulgation of Law No. 354 of 1954 on the Protection of Copyright. Article 20 of the law provided for a term of protection of 50 years after the author's death, although this was reduced to 15 years from publication in the case of "works of photography and audiovisual works that are not of creative character and merely consist of a mechanical reproduction of scenes." Official documents were explicitly excluded from copyright protection (Art. 4).

=== Law 82 of 2002 ===
The 1954 law was repealed in its entirety when the new Intellectual Property Law 82 of 2002 entered into force on 3 June 2002. The new law retains many provisions contained in the previous law, notably the 50-year p.m.a. term of copyright protection (Art. 160). However, it also introduces several new concepts, among them the concept of national folklore (Art. 138 & 142). The new law also deals for the first time ever with the protection of neighbouring rights (Art. 153 and following).

However, the new law is not without its critics. The International Intellectual Property Alliance (IIPA) has repeatedly highlighted in its reports a number of shortcomings in the law, stating in its Special 301 Report published in 2009 that "the Copyright Law and the Implementing Decree, while suitable to enforce against copyright piracy in general, left unresolved some TRIPS deficiencies, other ambiguities in protection, and important gaps for protection recommended by IIPA in order to modernize protection." Among the controversial provisions of the law is Article 148, which states that all foreign-language literary works fall into the public domain if they are not translated into Arabic within three years of publication.

=== Proposal to copyright antiquities ===
In late 2007, reports surfaced in the media that Egypt intended to pass a law requiring the payment of royalties whenever copies were made of its antiquities and monuments. Zahi Hawass, the head of the Supreme Council of Antiquities, told AFP news agency that the law would not affect buildings such as the Luxor Las Vegas hotel because it was not an exact copy of a pyramid and its interior was completely different. BBC News stated that "MPs are expected to pass" the law, although it is unclear whether the proposal ever made it through Parliament.

== International agreements ==
Egypt is a signatory to various international copyright agreements. The Berne Convention entered into force in Egypt on 7 June 1977, and the Phonograms Convention on 23 April 1978. Egypt became a member of the World Trade Organization on 30 June 1995.

== Piracy ==
As early as 1985, Egypt has been targeted by the IIPA. Based on the results of the Special 301 Report (which "examines in detail the adequacy and effectiveness of intellectual property rights" in many countries around the world), the United States Trade Representative (USTR) placed Egypt on the Priority Watch List in 1992. The USTR lowered Egypt to the Watch List in 2008. The problem of piracy is pervasive in Egypt. The IIPA stated in a 2009 report that Egypt is "a nightmare market for right holders, stunted by piracy, difficult bureaucracy, and almost unparalleled market access hurdles." Trade losses due to copyright piracy amounted to nearly $119 million in 2007, with a piracy level of 32% for books and 15% for records and music.
