= Copyright law of Tajikistan =

Law passed in 1998 and amended in 2003

Copyright law in Tajikistan is covered by the Law on Copyright and Related Rights of Republic of Tajikistan, adopted on 13 November 1998 (Law No. 726) and subsequently amended on 1 August 2003 (Law No. 27). Article 7 of this law defines what is not eligible to Copyright in the Republic. This includes: official documents (laws, court decisions, other texts of legislative, administrative or judicial character) and official translations thereof; state emblems and official signs (flags, armorial bearings, decorations, monetary signs and other State symbols and official signs); communications concerning events and facts that have informational character; and works of folklore.

== See also ==
- List of parties to international copyright treaties
