= Copyright law of Jordan =

The Jordanian Copyright Law and its Amendment No. (22) for the year 1992 is based on the Berne Convention for the Protection of Literary and Artistic Works and does not contain a definition of copyright; however in Article (3) it clearly states that the law offers legal protection to any kind of original work in literature, art and science regardless of the value or purpose of the work.

== Copyright registration ==
In the country of Jordan, copyright automatically attaches upon the creation of an original work of authorship; However registration / deposit with the National Library of the Jordanian Ministry of Culture puts a copyright holder in a better position should litigation arise over the copyright.

A copyright holder desiring to register his/her copyright should:

1. Obtain and complete the appropriate form(s).
2. Prepare clear renditions of material being submitted for copyright.
3. If relevant, obtain any necessary forfeit documents from persons who contributed to the work.
4. Deposit the work at the National Library.

Each work is issued a depository number, and no official fees are required.

(See Jordanian Copyright Law and Regulation)

== Copyright duration ==
Copyright protection begins when a work is actually created and fixed in a tangible form. For the majority of cases the duration of a copyright is for the life of the copyright owner plus fifty years following his/her death. There are two categories of exceptions to the standard duration of life plus fifty years, however.

1. The author of a work only enjoys copyright protection for fifty years from the date the work was created in the following circumstances
  - the author or rights-holder is a corporation, or other type of legal entity that grants some of the same rights as those that apply to natural persons
  - the work is a cinema or television production
  - the work is published for the first time after the death of the author
  - the work is published under a pseudonym. In this case, if the work's author reveals his/her identity within the protection period then the copyright duration is extended until 50 years following the author's death.
2. Photographs and applied arts enjoy only a 25-year protection period, commencing on January 1 of their creation year.

When the protection period expires the work enters into the public domain, making it legal for all to use.

(see Articles 30, 31, 32, 33 and 34 of the Jordanian Copyright Law No. 22 for the year 1992 and its amendments)

== Copyright holder ==
An author or creator is the copyright holder for any work they publish that is attributed to them, whether or not copyright is clearly stated in the work or by any other means. If an employee creates, during employment, a work related to the activities or business of the employer, or by using the material placed under their disposal to arrive at the work, then the copyright shall be that of the employer unless agreed otherwise in writing.

(see Article 6 of the Jordanian Copyright Law)

== Copyright exceptions ==
Works that have entered into the public domain have no copyright protection. Also some works have what is referred to as a copylife license, meaning that the author has granted everyone permission to freely use and improve upon the work.

Also if the exploitation of the work is for educational purposes or for personal use, then in such cases the use of the work will be legal and therefore not qualified as an infringement.

Laws, regulations and court judgments, news items and reports do not carry a copyright. The Minister of Culture holds the copyright for works that fall into the category of national heritage and is charged with preventing misuse of such works while at the same time allowing public access to those works.

== Rights Associated with Copyright ==
The rights that attach to copyright can be classified into economic rights and moral rights. Moral rights can not be sold or surrendered and require that the work be attributed to its author. In contrast, economic rights may be assigned by the author as they wish provided the assignment is in writing and unequivocally states the right at issue, its scope, purpose, place and term. (see Article 13 of the Jordanian Copyright Law)

Conversely, the law nullified any action taken by the author/copyright holder in their collective future thought product.(see Article 14 of the Jordanian Copyright Law)

A copyright holder's exclusive rights grant the holder the freedom to exercise the rights associated with copyright, and require others to obtain the consent of the copyright holder before exercising those rights.

Several exclusive rights attach to the copyright holder, including

- the right to publish and produce copies or reproductions of the work and to sell those copies (including electronic copies)
- the right to make amendments to the work (to improve or change the work)
- the right to create derivative works (works that adapt the original work)
- the right to perform or display the work publicly
- the right to sell or assign these rights to others
- the right to withdraw the work from circulation
- the right to challenge any infringement of the work

(see Article 8 of the Jordanian Copyright Law No.22 for the year 1992 and its amendments)

An infringement on a copyright typically occurs when one or more of the copyright holder's rights are utilized by others without the authorization of the copyright holder.

== Compulsory licensing ==
The Jordanian Minister of Culture has the right to assign a nonexclusive, non-assignable license to Jordanian nationals for either of two purposes:

1. translation and publication of a foreign work to the Arabic language, provided that no such translation was made by the author within three years form the work's initial publication
2. publication of a work for sale at a lower or equal price as similar works offered for sale in Jordan

Compulsory licensing is only granted for uses tied to education, and in all cases the author of the original work remains entitled to just compensation.

== Copyright protection ==
Authors/copyright holders whose copyrights have been infringed have the right to receive just compensation. When determining such compensation the courts take a number of elements into account such as the author's cultural standing, the value of the work as such, the value of the work in the market place and the extent to which the infringing party has profited from the exploitation of the work.

In addition the author (or the heirs or legal successors) may request that the courts take measures to:

- halt the infringement
- confiscate the infringing work, its reproductions, copies or any other material used in the reproduction
- destroy the work's reproductions or copies.
- confiscate the revenues resulting from the copyright infringement

In instances of counterfeiting or the utilization of an author's exclusive right without authorization, the infringing party may be subject to criminal penalties in the form of imprisonment for a period not less than three months and not more than three years and a fine not less than one thousand Jordanian Dinars and not more than three thousand Jordanian Dinars.

== See also ==
- List of parties to international copyright treaties
