= Copyright law of Nepal =

Copyright law in Nepal

The Copyright Act, 2002 प्रतिलिपि अधिकार ऐन, २०५९

Parliament of Nepal
- Long title: An act made to provide for copyright.
- Citation: Act No. 8 of 2059 (2002)
- Enacted by: Parliament of Nepal
- Enacted: 15 August 2002
- Royal assent: 15 August 2002
- Commenced: 15 August 2002

Amended by
- Some Nepal Acts relating to Export and Import and Intellectual Property Act, 2063 (2006)
- Status: Current legislation

The Copyright law of Nepal governs copyright, the right to control the use and distribution of artistic and creative works in Nepal and also encourages the creation of art and culture by rewarding authors and artists with a set of exclusive rights. It is embodied in the Copyright Act, 2059 (2002), the Copyright Rule, 2061 (2004) and their amendments. Nepal Copyright Registrar's Office handles copyright registration, recording of copyright transfers and other administrative aspects of copyright law. In Nepal, the Copyright Act of 2059 B.S. defines a “Copyright Work” as any original and intellectual work in literature, art, science, or any other field. The author of such a work is known as the Copyright Owner and is entitled to various rights, including Economic Rights, Moral Rights, and Royalty Rights.

The Copyright Act, 2002 (Nepali: प्रतिलिपि अधिकार ऐन, २०५९) was enacted by Parliament of Nepal and came into force on 15 August 2002. It repealed the previous Copyright Act, 2022 (1965).

Nepal also has a trademark regime in Nepal embodied in the Patent, Design and Trademark Act, 2022 (1965) whereby a person can obtain ownership of the trademark for their business by registering it within the Department under Section 18 of the Act. However, the business must either be registered under the Department of Small and Cottage Industries or Department of Industry. Patent law in Nepal provides legal protection for inventions and innovations. It grants inventors exclusive rights to their creations for a specified period. The Patent, Design and Trade Mark Act, 2022 (1965) governs patent law in Nepal.

== Economic rights ==
According to the law, the owner of copyright shall have the exclusive right to reproduce, translate, revise or amend, sell, distribute or rent, broadcast or communicate the work to the general public. These rights are given for one time, it cannot be reissued once the duration is over.

== Moral rights ==
The author is entitled for his lifetime, irrespective of the validity of the copyright, to get his/her name mentioned in copies of the work or in his/her work where it is used publicly and to make necessary amendment or revision in the work.

== Duration of copyright ==
- Sound recording, broadcasting and performance -up to 50 years from the date of first publication
- Art and photographs- up to 25 years from the date of first publication
- Books - up to 50 years from the death of last surviving author

== Reproduction ==
- Reproduction is allowed freely for educational purposes with citation to the source.
