= Copyright of official texts =

Terms of copyright for works created by government

Official texts, as defined in Article 2(4) of the Berne Convention for the Protection of Literary and Artistic Works, are texts of a legislative, administrative and legal nature (e.g. statute laws, administrative regulations and court decisions) and the official translations of such texts.

The Convention indicates that it shall be left to the discretion of each member country of the Berne Convention to determine the protection to be granted to such official texts in that country.

Generally, member countries of the Convention include official texts in the public domain. However, the governments of the United Kingdom and some Commonwealth countries claim a Crown copyright in their works. Many republics of the Commonwealth also copyright their official works, though they have no crown copyright.

== Table ==
Countries and areas	Types of official texts	Terms of copyright protection	References and related articles
Albania	Literary and artistic works being summaries of the official gazette of legislative and administrative nature and their official translations	0, no copyright	Art. 3, Law no. 7564 of 19 April 1992, as modified by Law no. 7923 of 19 May 1995
Algeria	Laws and regulations, decisions and administrative acts of state bodies and local authorities, court decisions, and their official translations	0, no copyright	Art. 11, Ordonnance n° 03-05 du 19 Joumada El Oula 1424 correspondant au 19 juillet 2003 relative aux droits d’auteur et aux droits voisins
Algeria	Other state works	Freely usable for non-profit when respecting the source and integrity of the works	Art. 9, Ordonnance n° 03-05 du 19 Joumada El Oula 1424 correspondant au 19 juillet 2003 relative aux droits d’auteur et aux droits voisins
Andorra	Official text of a legislative, administrative or legal nature, and its official translation	0, no copyright	Art. 4, Law on Copyright and Related Rights of 1999
Angola	Laws and judicial and administrative decisions	0, no copyright	Art. 9, Copyright Law n° 4/90, March 1990
Antigua and Barbuda	Public record	0, no copyright (may make or supply to any person of any copy of the work)	s. 67, Copyright Act, 2002
Armenia	Official documents (laws, decisions, decrees, etc.) as well as their official translations; state emblems and signs (flags, coats of arms (armorial bearings), medals (decorations), monetary signs, etc.)	0, no copyright	Art. 6, Law on Copyright and Neighbouring Rights
Austria	Laws, ordinances and official decrees issued by Austrian federal and state authorities	0, no copyright	Austrian copyright law (§7 UrhG)
Australia	Work, film or sound recording made by or under the direction or control of the Government, and any work first published by or under the direction or control of the Government.	50 years until year end from publication	Part VII of the Copyright Act 1968 Main article: Crown copyright § Australia
Azerbaijan	Official documents (laws, court decisions, other texts of legislative, administrative or judicial character) and official translations thereof; State emblems and official signs (flags, armorial bearings, decorations, monetary signs and other State symbols and official signs)	0, no copyright	Art. 7, Law of Azerbaijan Republic "on Copyright and Neighbouring Right
Bahrain	Court judgments passed by the law courts in various degrees and translations of such judgments; Official documents such as texts of laws, Amiri Decrees, administrative orders, international treaties, their translations and all official documents; Unless published in compiled publications for a reason that is attributed to creative efforts, arrangement or any other personal effort	0, no copyright	Art. 4(1)(a), (b), (2), Legislative Decree no. 10 of 1993
Belarus	Formal documents (laws, judgements, other texts of legal, administrative and judicial nature), and also their official translations; State symbols and signs (flag, coat of arms, anthem, awards, banknotes and other signs)	0, no copyright	Law of the Republic of Belarus: No. 370-XIII of May 16, 1996: Section 2, Article 8 (in Russian, in English)
Belgium	Official texts of the government	0, no copyright	Art. XI.172, §2 of the Commercial Code (in Dutch, in French)
Brazil	Formal documents (laws, judgements, other texts of legal, administrative and judicial nature)	0, no copyright	Law 9610/98, article 8 (,
Canada	Canadian governmental works	50 years until year end from publication (the first publication)	Section 12 of the Copyright Act (French: Loi sur le droit d'auteur) Main article: Crown copyright § Canada
Canada	Federal laws	Reproductions are allowed with certain conditions, whether under Crown Copyright or not.	Reproduction of Federal Law Order (French: Décret sur la reproduction de la législation fédérale et des décisions des tribunaux de constitution fédérale)
China, People's Republic of (Mainland)	Laws; regulations; resolutions, decisions and orders of state organs; other documents of legislative, administrative and judicial nature; and their official translations	0, no copyright	Article 5 of the Copyright Law of the People's Republic of China
Czech Republic	An official work, such as a legal regulation, decision, public charter, publicly accessible register and the collection of its records, and also; An official draft of an official work and other preparatory official documentation including the official translation of such work, Chamber of Deputies and Senate publications, A memorial chronicle of a municipality (municipal chronicle), A state symbol and symbol of a regional self-governing unit, and; Other such works where there is public interest in their exclusion from copyright protection.	0, no copyright	Czech Copyright Act (Law No. 121/2000, Section 3, Letter a)
Djibouti	Laws, judicial and administrative decisions as well as their official translations	0, no copyright	Art. 7(a), Loi n°114/AN/96/3e L relatif à la protection du droit d'auteur
Georgia	1. a) official documents (laws, decisions of courts, other texts of administrative and normative character), as well as their official translations; b) official symbols of state (flag, emblem, anthem, award, monetary symbols, other official signs and symbols of state); c) information of events and facts.; 2. When using the works mentioned in subparagraph "b" of this Article under the other person's name, it is possible to protect the right of author's name.	0, no copyright	Article 8 of the Law of Georgia No. 2388-Is of September 9, 1999 on Copyright and Neighbouring Rights (in Russian, in English)
Georgia	Proposed official symbols and drafts of formal documents	Can be copyrighted	Article 8 of the Law of Georgia No. 2388-Is of September 9, 1999 on Copyright and Neighbouring Rights (in Russian, in English)
Germany	A statute, ordinance, official decree or judgment (official work) issued by a German federal or state authority or court	0, no copyright	German copyright law (§ 5 Abs.1 UrhG).
Ghana	Governmental works (Art. 3)	70 years from creation or publication, whichever is later	Copyright Act, 2005 (Art. 13)
Greece	Official texts expressive of the authority of the State, notably to legislative, administrative or judicial texts	0, no copyright	Art. 2(5), Law 2121/1993
Guatemala	Works of the state or its public entities, municipalities, universities and other educational establishments in the country.	75 years until year end from publication	Chapter 5, and specifically Art. 49, Law on Copyright and Related Rights (Decree No. 33-98 last modified by Decree No. 56-2000)
Guatemala	Laws, decrees, regulations, orders, agreements, resolutions, judicial decisions and decisions of governmental bodies, as well as official translations of these texts.	Freely usable when respecting the source and integrity of the works	Art. 68, Law on Copyright and Related Rights (Decree No. 33-98 last modified by Decree No. 56-2000)
Hong Kong	Public record	0, no copyright (may be copied for any purpose without infringement of copyright)	Article 58, Chapter 528 of the Law of Hong Kong, the Copyright Ordinance (Chinese: 版權條例)
Hong Kong	Work made by an on-duty officer of the Government	50 years from publication or 125 years from creation, whichever is shorter (until year end)	Chapter 528 of the Law of Hong Kong, the Copyright Ordinance: Article 182, Article 183, and; Article 184.
Hong Kong	Ordinances (laws)	50 years from publication in the Gazette (until year end)	Chapter 528 of the Law of Hong Kong, the Copyright Ordinance: Article 182, Article 183, and; Article 184.
Hong Kong	Work made by or under the direction or control of the Legislative Council	50 years after creation (until year end)	Chapter 528 of the Law of Hong Kong, the Copyright Ordinance: Article 182, Article 183, and; Article 184.
India	Government work	60 years until year end since publication	S. 28,
Indonesia	Result of open meetings of State institutions; Laws or regulations; Courts decisions or judge provisions	0, no copyright	Art. 42, Law No. 28 of Copyright Law of 2014
Italy	Texts of official acts of the State or of public administrations, whether Italian or foreign	0, no copyright	Art. 5, Law No. 633 of 22 April 1941, as amended by Art. 17, Law No. 52 of 6 February 1996
Japan	Official texts	0, no copyright	Art. 13, Law No. 48 of 6 May 1970, as amended
Korea, Republic of (South)	Official texts	0, no copyright	Art. 7, Copyright Act of 30 December 1989
Latvia	1. Regulatory enactments and administrative rulings, other documents issued by the State and Local Governments and adjudications of courts (laws, court judgments, decisions and other official documents), as well as official translations of such texts; 2. State approved as well as internationally recognized official symbols and signs (flags, coats of arms, anthems, decorations, banknotes, and the like), the use of which is subject to specific regulatory enactments; 3. Maps, the preparation and use of which are determined by regulatory enactments;	0, no copyright	
Macau	Official texts, in particular the texts of treaties, laws and regulations and those of reports or decisions by authorities of any kind, and translations thereof	0, no copyright	Article 6 of Decree-Law n.o 43/99/M
Malaysia	Works of the Government, Government organizations and international bodies	50 years until year end since publication	s. 23, Copyright Act 1987
Nigeria	Governmental literary, musical or non-photograph artistic works	70 years until year end since publication	Schedule I, Copyright Act (Cap. 68) 1990
Netherlands	Laws, decisions and regulations by a public authority, as well as judgements and administrative decisions.	0, no copyright	Article 11 of Dutch Copyright Law (Auteurswet)
New Zealand	General Crown copyright	100 years until year end (Section 26(3)(b))	Sections 2(1), 26 and 27 of the Copyright Act 1994 Main article: Crown copyright § New_Zealand
New Zealand	Typographical arrangements of published material	25 years until year end	Sections 2(1), 26 and 27 of the Copyright Act 1994 Main article: Crown copyright § New_Zealand
Pakistan	Government work	50 years until year end from its publication	S. 22 of the Copyright Ordinance, 1962
Philippines	Any official text of a legislative, administrative or legal nature and official translation thereof	0, no copyright	Section 175, Intellectual Property Code of the Philippines
Poland	(1) Normative texts and the drafts thereof (2) Official documents, documentary material, devices and symbols.	0, no copyright	Article 4 of Law of February 4, 1994, on Copyright and Neighboring Rights
Romania	Official texts of a political, legislative, administrative or judicial nature, and official translations thereof	0, no copyright	Article 9 of Law No. 8 of March 14, 1996, on Copyright and Neighboring Rights
Russia	Shall not be objects of copyright: official documents of state government agencies and local government agencies of municipal formations, including laws, other legal texts, judicial decisions, other materials of legislative, administrative and judicial character, official documents of international organizations, as well as their official translations; state symbols and signs (flags, emblems, orders, banknotes, and the like), as well as symbols and signs of municipal formations;	0, no copyright	Article 1259 of Civil Code of Russian Federation
Singapore	Literary, dramatic or musical work, or engraving or a photograph made by or under the direction or control of the Government	70 years until year end from publication	s. 197(3), (4A), Copyright Act
Singapore	Artistic work, other than engraving or a photograph, made by or under the direction or control of the Government	70 years until year end after making	s. 197(4), Copyright Act
Slovakia	Legal regulation, decision, public charter, publicly accessible register, official document, Slovak technical standard; this includes the preparatory documents and translations; Daily news; Public speeches (with except of the right of inclusion in a collection or edition)	0, no copyright	Slovak Copyright Act (Law No. 618/2003, Section 7, Par. 3, Let. b)
South Africa	State works otherwise eligible for copyright	50 years until year end from publication	S. 5, Copyright Act, 1978
South Africa	Official texts of a legislative, administrative or legal nature, or in official translations of such texts, or in speeches of a political nature or in speeches delivered in the course of legal proceedings, or in news of the day that are mere items of press information	0, no copyright	S. 12(8)(a), of the Copyright Act, 1978
Sudan	Official documents	0, no copyright	S. 6(b) of the Copyright and Neighbouring Rights Protection Act 1996
Taiwan, Republic of China	Constitution, acts, regulations, and official documents (proclamations, text of speeches, news releases, and other documents prepared by civil servants in the course of carrying out their duties), and their translations and compilations by central and local government agencies; Test questions and alternative test questions from all kinds of examinations held pursuant to laws or regulations	0, no copyright	Article 9 of the Copyright Act of the Republic of China
Thailand	Official documents	0, no copyright	Section 7 of the Copyright Act, BE 2537 (1994)
Ukraine	Official documents of political, legislative and administrative nature (laws, decrees, resolutions, court awards, State standards, etc.), and their official translations; State symbols of Ukraine, government awards; symbols and signs of government authorities, the Armed Forces of Ukraine and other military formations; symbols of territorial communities; symbols and signs of enterprises, institutions and organizations; Banknotes;	0, no copyright	Article 10, Paragraph II, Law of Ukraine "On Copyright and Related Rights"
United Kingdom	Works produced by the British Government	50 years from the date of publication	Main article: Crown copyright § United_Kingdom
United States	Work of the United States Government Edicts of government, such as judicial opinions, administrative rulings, legislative enactments, public ordinances, and similar official legal documents	0, no copyright 0, no copyright	17 U.S.C. § 105 § 206.01 of the Compendium II: Copyright Office Practices
Venezuela	Texts of laws, decrees, official regulations, public treaties, judicial decisions and other official acts	0, no copyright	Art. 4, Ley sobre el Dercho de Autor as modified by the Decreto del 14 de agosto de 1993
Zimbabwe	Publications of the State	50 years until year end from publication generally, with perpetual copyright if never published	S. 49, Copyright Act (Chapter 26:1)

== See also ==
- Consumer protection
- Government edicts doctrine
