= Copyright law of Malaysia =

Legal framework in Malaysia

The copyright law of Malaysia grants copyright owners a “build of rights with respect to their work”. It simultaneously attempts to ensure “the delineation between protected work and the public domains” through various clauses. With the stated purpose of promoting innovation and creativity, by ensuring that creators can benefit financially and control how their works are used and distributed. Copyright owners can claim ownership through a Statutory Declaration or by filing a Voluntary Notification at the Intellectual Property Corporation of Malaysia (MyIPO)

The Intellectual Property Corporation of Malaysia is the governmental agency responsible for administering and regulating intellectual property rights in Malaysia under the Intellectual Property Corporation of Malaysia Act 2002.

Malaysia copyright law is cited as the Copyright Act 1987 under the Act 332 of the Laws of Malaysia. The Copyright Act 1987 in section 5 grants to the Minister the authority to elect "amongst any public officers and persons in the employment" of the Intellectual Property Corporation of Malaysia, Deputy Controllers of Copyright, Assistant Controllers of Copyright, and other officers for the effective administration of this Act.

== History ==
Prior to the Copyright Act 1987, the British Copyright Act 1911 was the primary legislation governing copyright in Malaysia until the country gained independence in 1957. Subsequently, the Copyright Ordinance of 1958 was enacted to provide copyright protection within the newly formed nation.

However, recognizing the need to update and modernize the copyright laws to meet the challenges of the evolving digital age, Malaysia introduced the Copyright Act 1987. This comprehensive legislation aimed to strengthen copyright protection, provide clarity on rights and obligations, and align the country's copyright laws with international standards and treaties. As with majority of copyright laws, Malaysia copyright law traces its origins to the Statute of Anne, inherited from its colonial past when it was under British rule.

Since its inception, the Copyright Act 1987 has undergone several significant updates to adapt to the changing landscape of intellectual property rights and technological advancements. These updates were made to address emerging issues, address gaps in the law, and comply with international obligations.

In 1990, amendments were made to the Copyright Act, incorporating provisions to enhance the protection of performers' rights and neighboring rights. These amendments recognized the rights of performers, such as actors, musicians, and dancers, and expanded the scope of protection for their creative contributions.

In that same year Malaysia became a signatory of Berne Convention for the protection of Literary and Artistic Works on 1 October and therefore, copyrighted work created in Malaysia would be recognised by each contracting member country of the Berne Convention.

Another notable update occurred in 1999 when the Copyright Act was amended to incorporate provisions related to the protection of computer programs and databases. This amendment aimed to address the growing importance of software and digital databases in various industries and strengthen their legal protection.

In the year 2000, further amendments were made to the Copyright Act, introducing provisions to safeguard the rights of copyright owners in the digital environment. These amendments took into account the emergence of the internet, digital technologies, and online platforms, providing mechanisms to combat copyright infringement in the digital realm.

In 2003, additional amendments were introduced to the Copyright Act to enhance enforcement measures and strengthen the penalties for copyright infringement. These changes aimed to deter piracy and provide a more effective legal framework for protecting the rights of copyright owners.

The Copyright Act of 1987, with subsequent amendments, remains the primary legislation governing copyright in Malaysia. It provides a legal framework that balances the interests of creators, copyright owners, and users, fostering creativity, innovation, and the dissemination of knowledge and culture in the country. Over the years, Malaysia has continued to engage in international discussions and collaborations to harmonize its copyright laws with global standards and promote effective enforcement of copyright protection.
