= Intellectual Property Corporation of Malaysia Act 2002 =

Malaysian intellectual property law

Parliament of Malaysia
- Long title: An Act to establish the Intellectual Property Corporation of Malaysia and to provide for its functions and powers and for matters connected therewith.
- Citation: Act 617
- Territorial extent: Throughout Malaysia
- Passed by: Dewan Rakyat
- Passed: 8 October 2001
- Passed by: Dewan Negara
- Passed: 26 November 2001
- Royal assent: 14 January 2002
- Commenced: 24 January 2002
- Effective: [3 March 2003, P.U. (B) 102/2003]

Legislative history

First chamber: Dewan Rakyat
- Bill title: Intellectual Property Corporation of Malaysia Bill 2001
- Bill citation: D.R. 34/2001
- Introduced by: Muhyiddin Yassin, Minister of Domestic Trade and Consumer Affairs
- First reading: 7 August 2001
- Second reading: 8 October 2001
- Third reading: 8 October 2001

Second chamber: Dewan Negara
- Bill title: Intellectual Property Corporation of Malaysia Bill 2001
- Bill citation: D.R. 34/2001
- Member(s) in charge: Muhyiddin Yassin, Minister of Domestic Trade and Consumer Affairs
- First reading: 26 November 2001
- Second reading: 26 November 2001
- Third reading: 26 November 2001

Related legislation
- Trade Marks Act 1976 [Act 175] Patents Act 1983 [Act 291] Copyright Act 1987 [Act 332] Industrial Designs Act 1996 [Act 552] Layout-Designs of Integrated Circuits Act 2000 [Act 601] Geographical Indications Act 2000 [Act 602]
- Status: In force

The Intellectual Property Corporation of Malaysia Act 2002 (Malay: Akta Perbadanan Harta Intelek Malaysia 2002), is a Malaysian laws which enacted to establish the Intellectual Property Corporation of Malaysia and to provide for its functions and powers and for matters connected therewith.

== Structure ==
The Intellectual Property Corporation of Malaysia Act 2002, in its current form (1 January 2006), consists of 7 Parts containing 41 sections and 2 schedules (including no amendment).

- Part I: Preliminary
- Part II: The Corporation
- Part III: Functions and Powers of the Corporation
- Part IV: Provisions Relating to Employees
- Part V: Finance
- Part VI: General
- Schedules
