= Copyright law of Cameroon =

Flag of Cameroon

Copyright in Cameroon generally lasts for life plus 50 years.

Cameroon has entered into the following copyright agreements:

- Berne Convention for the Protection of Literary and Artistic Works - 21 September 1964
- Universal Copyright Convention (Geneva) - 1 May 1973
- Universal Copyright Convention (Paris) - 10 July 1974
- Agreement on Trade-Related Aspects of Intellectual Property Rights - 13 December 1995
