= Copyright law of El Salvador =

The Copyright law of El Salvador is legal rights to creative and artistic works under the laws of El Salvador. It was implemented in the Decree No. 604 of the Legislative Assembly of El Salvador on 16 of August 1993. This law aims to protect the economic and moral rights of Salvadoran authors and foreigners residing in El Salvador, granted by the mere fact of creating works that are literary, artistic and scientific.

== History ==
The Copyright Law is ratified on the Article 103 of the Constitution of El Salvador of 1983. As of 2025, the World Intellectual Property Organization (WIPO), an agency of the United Nations, listed the Law on Intellectual Property (approved by Decree No. 66 of August 15, 2024) as the main IP law enacted by the legislature of El Salvador.. WIPO holds the text of this law in their WIPO Lex database. It supersedes the Legislative Decree No. 604 of 15 July 1993. WIPO also holds a copy on the 1993 law.

El Salvador has been a member of the Universal Copyright Convention since 29 March 1979, the Berne Convention since 19 February 1994, the World Trade Organization since 7 May 1995 and the WIPO Copyright Treaty since 6 March 2002.

== Types of Protected Works ==
The present law protects the works of the personal creation, that is, originality. There is a mention list of protected work:

- Books, Pamphlets and Writings.
- Computer Programs such as software.
- Musical Works (with or without lyrics).
- Works of oratory, Three-Dimensional works, and Works of applied art.
- Written or recorded versions of lectures, speeches, lessons, sermons and other works of the same type.
- Dramatic or Dramatico-musical and Choreographic works.
- Stage adaptations of dramatic or operatic works.
- Works of architecture or engineering.
- Globes, atlases and maps pertaining to any kind of study.
- Photographs, lithographs and engravings.
- Audiovisual works such as silent, spoken or musical cinematographic works.
- Works of radio or television broadcasting.
- Plans or other graphic reproductions and translations.
- All other works that by analogy may be considered included within the same generic categories as the works specified.

== Application ==
Authors deserve the right in accord with Acts and contracts related to copyright that are drawn up in a public deed, and authors can be registered in the Intellectual Property Registry with exceptions to foreign acts or contracts that are accepted as granted, provided that they have the respective authenticity mentioned in art. 56 of the Intellectual Property Law.

The author must present the act or contract in original in public deed, the payment receipt for the value of $11.43 US dollars, and the interested party may ask for his act or contract the following day. There are two cases of the application: One is the deposit of work which the author's certificate is delivered to the interested party that accompanied by a copy of the sealed work; and in case of make a record of acts or copyright contract, The acts or contracts will be photocopied to form a book, and The original act or contract are returned to the interested party to make an Author's record.

== Duration ==
The duration of the copyright takes the life of the author plus seventy years after death of the author.

In case of being an anonymous or pseudonym work, whose author is not been revealed, the protection shall be a 70-year period.

Counted from 1 January of the next year of the first disclosure. Checking of the author of the anonymous or pseudonym work, or the holder of the copyright, the provision of the previous letter will apply. If an authorized disclosure have not been made or done after 50 years, counted from the year of creation or release of the work, interpretation, or performance of the issue; the protection period shall be taken from 1 January of the next year after the content released, performed, or created.

Originally, the Law was established as an extension of 50 years, which was amended in 2005, increasing that period to 70 years after the death of the author.

== Public Domain ==
Works will be in public domain which will be a free work for any person who respects the same authority and integrity.

Included in this type of work common cultural heritage of the following:

- Expiration of Duration of the copyright content (after 70 years of the author's death).
- Works of unknown authorship, including the songs, legends, dances and expressions of folklore.
- Null or resignation content.
- Unsubmitted files within an indicated period.
- Withdrawn application or certificate works.
- Annexed documents from foreign languages after six months of presentation.
- Works whose holders waived the protection afforded by this law.

== Exceptions ==
The Copyright Law of El Salvador has a application for authors who want to provide their rights from the illegal piracy, probative media means before third parties and attests to the existence of the work, interpretation or production. However, There are some limitations exceptions in copyright in which anyone can make use of the works without the authorization of the author or right holder.

Examples are:

- Freedom of panorama: Regarding works which is already lawfully disclosed, it is allowed without authorization of the author or remuneration. The reproduction of a work of art on permanent display in a street, square or other public place in an artistic medium different from that used for the making of the original; with regard to buildings, this right shall be limited to the outer walls.
- It is permissible to carry out briefly without the author's authorization or payment of remuneration, citations of works lawfully published, with the obligation to indicate the name of the author and the source, and provided that such appointments are made in accordance with honest practices and in the measure justified by the end pursued.

== Infringement ==
Copyright infringement occurs when someone violates one of the exclusive rights. Commonly, this involves someone creating or distributing a "copy" of a protected work that is "substantially similar" to the original version. Infringement requires copying. If two or more people happen to write exactly the same story at the same time, without knowledge of the other, there is no infringement.

The violation of copyright is an infringement with the author's rights, regardless of act in any way less or harmless the moral or economic interests of the author. Authority or natural or legal person may not authorize the use of the work, interpretation, performance or any other work protected by the law, including any kind of communication media (with exceptions). If anyone doesn't respect the copyright, the delinquent will be punished with imprisonment of 2 to 4 years
