= Copyright law of Serbia =

Law of Serbia

The Serbian copyright act (Serbian: Закон о ауторском и сродним правима) was published in 2009. Prior to that, a similar copyright act of Serbia and Montenegro was adopted on 24 December 2004, and it remained in force after the country's split under the "Declaration of Continuation by Republic of Serbia" dated 19 September 2006.

== Contents ==
The act consists of eight sections:

1. Subject-matter of the act
2. Copyright
3. Related rights
4. Exercise of copyright and related rights
5. Records of works of authorship and subject-matters of related rights
6. Protection of copyright and related rights
7. Penal provisions
8. Transitional and final provisions

== Scope ==
The act defines the "work of authorship" as an "author's original intellectual creation, expressed in a certain form, regardless of its value, purpose, size and contents". The following are considered as "works of authorship in particular":

1. Written works
2. Spoken works (lectures, speeches, orations, etc.);
3. Dramatic, dramatic-musical, choreographic and pantomime works, as well as works originating from folklore;
4. Works of music
5. Films (cinema and television);
6. Fine art works
7. Works of architecture, applied art and industrial design;
8. Cartographic works
9. Drawings, sketches, dummies and photographs;
10. The direction of a theatre play.

== Exemptions ==
According to the Article 6 (section 2) of the act,

1. The protection of copyright shall not apply to general ideas, principles and instructions included in a work of authorship.
2. The following shall not be deemed works of authorship:
  1. Laws, decrees and other regulations;
  2. Official materials of state bodies and bodies performing public functions;
  3. Official translations of regulations and official materials of state bodies and bodies performing public functions;
  4. Submissions and other documents presented in the administrative or court proceedings.

== See also ==
- List of parties to international copyright treaties
