= Copyright law of Greece =

Copyright laws in Greece are part of the framework of laws that are coordinated with the guidelines of the European Union.

Enforcement of the copyright laws varies from case to case. Greece has attracted attention because of its extended copyright infringement of software and music. The Greek government has tried to impose countermeasures such as the prosecution of those who produce or consume unauthorized material, with questionable results.
