= Copyright law of the Netherlands =

Copyright in the Netherlands is governed by the Dutch Copyright Law (called Auteurswet), copyright (auteursrecht in Dutch) is the exclusive right of the author of a work of literature or artistic work to publish and copy such work.

A work of literature or artistic work attracts copyright at its fixation. No formalities, such as copyright registration, are necessary to obtain all the exclusive rights that the Dutch copyright provides. The duration of a copyright is generally 70 years after the death of the author. The term "work" includes many materials, such as books, brochures, films, photographs, musical works, works of visual art and geographical maps. Furthermore, the Dutch Supreme Court has ruled that to be considered a work, it should have its own, original character with the personal imprint of the author (HR 4 January 1991, NJ 1991, 608(Van Dale/Romme)). This threshold of originality has since been superseded by a decision of the European Court of Justice (C-5/08) and is now "The author's own intellectual Creation".

The exclusive right to publish a work includes amongst others the publication of a copy of (part of) the work, the public recitation thereof and to rent or lend (part of) the work to public institutions. The exclusive right to duplicate a work includes amongst others the recording, the translation, the music arrangement and the adaptation for the screen of the work.

== International laws and treaties ==
Copyright laws differ between countries. However, there are several international treaties concerning copyright that harmonise copyright to a certain extent. The Netherlands is a signature state to among others:

- The Berne Convention, 1886
- The Universal Copyright Convention, 1952
- The WIPO Copyright Treaty, 1996
- The WIPO Performances and Phonograms Treaty, 1996
- The Agreement on Trade-Related Aspects of Intellectual Property Rights (TRIPs) (which manages the rights concerning trade in intellectual property)

Since the Netherlands is a member state of the European Union all directives and regulations of the European Union apply in the Netherlands. As such copyright in the Netherlands has some specific features over the Copyright law of the European Union

== Specific features ==
- Copyright is only granted to creative, original works. The creator of the work must have used some creativity or a certain creative decision must have been made. Creativity is a relative term, however, as this is a legal, not aesthetic, standard.
- Copyright is granted automatically, without any (registration) formality, in the Netherlands, as it is in any other country that is party to the Berne Convention. This means that it is not necessary to include copyright indicators such as "copyright 2006". In fact, the word "copyright" has no legal meaning in the Netherlands.
- A copyright lasts for a finite amount of time. Specifically, 70 years after the death of the author. When a copyright expires, the work becomes part of the public domain. An author also can prematurely renounce a copyright.
- Neither the expertise of the author, nor the quality of the creation itself is a relevant factor in determining whether a creation is a work or not. An underexposed, badly composed picture of the Eiffel Tower can be just as copyright-protected as a two-meter-tall print of a perfect photograph of the same tower by a professional photographer, provided that the legal requirements of a work are met.
- Dutch laws, rulings and regulations are not copyright-protected. This means that they can be used at all times by anyone for any purpose (article 11). However, some publishers of legal texts and court rulings may claim auteursrecht with regard to the form or order in which they are presented.
- The Auteurswet allows for citaatrecht (quotation right). This allows the use of (parts of) a work under a limitative set of conditions. Quotation rights appear to be more limited and demarcated than the concept of fair use.
- A portretrecht (portrait right) regards rights of the person portrayed in a portrait that is not made on behalf of that person, in contrast to an auteursrecht which grants rights to the creator of a work. An example is the publication of someone's picture in a magazine. The person portrayed can oppose such publication to the extent he or she has a reasonable interest in doing so.
- A copyright can be transferred or licensed. A license is a permission of the author to use the work as agreed upon by the author and the licensee. In order to be valid, a transfer of the auteursrecht should be in writing.
- An author can transfer a copyright to someone else using securitisatie, at which point the author receives the current value of future copyright revenues at the time of public presentation.
- Copyright, like the French idea of "droits d'auteur", also includes moral rights. This includes the right of the author to oppose the publication of the work without stating him as the author and any modifications or malformations to the work. The author can only partly waive his moral rights, meaning that the author retains certain rights, even if the copyright is transferred or renounced.
- Copyright infringement is governed not only by civil law, but also by criminal law.
- Marks and inventions are primarily governed by trademark rights and patents, respectively.

== Limitations and exceptions to Dutch copyright ==
Limitations and exceptions to copyright are harmonised in the 2001 Information Society Directive of the European Union. This directive allows 21 specific limitations or exceptions. Of this list only temporary acts of reproductions is a mandatory exception to copyright within the European Union. The Netherlands has adopted 17 of these limitations and exceptions:

- Temporary acts of reproduction
- Photocopying/photo-reproduction
- Private copying
- Reproductions by Libraries, Archives & Museums
- Ephemeral recordings made by broadcasters
- Illustration for teaching or scientific research
- Use for the benefit of people with a disability
- Reporting by the press on current events
- Quotation for criticism or review
- Use for public security purposes
- Use of public speeches and public lectures
- Use during religious or official celebrations
- Use of works of architecture or sculptures in public spaces
- Incidental inclusion
- Use for advertising the exhibition or sale of works of art
- Use for the purpose of caricature, parody or pastiche
- Use for the purpose of research or private study

=== Pre-existing exceptions and limitations ===
The Information Society Directive also allows for pre-existing limitations and exceptions that existed in national legislation prior to the adoption of the directive. The Netherlands has four further notable limitations and exceptions to copyright:

- The further communication to the public or reproduction of a literary, scientific or artistic work communicated to the public by or on behalf of the public authorities shall not be deemed an infringement of the copyright in such a work, unless the copyright has been explicitly reserved, either in a general manner by law, decree or ordinance, or in a specific case by a notice on the work itself or at the communication to the public. Even if no such reservation has been made, the author shall retain the exclusive right to have appear, in the form of a collection, his works which have been communicated to the public by or on behalf of the public authorities.
- The lending as referred to in article 12(1), sub 3, of the whole or part of a specimen of the work or a reproduction thereof brought into circulation by or with the consent of the right-holder shall not be deemed an infringement of copyright, provided the person doing or arranging the lending pays an equitable remuneration. The first sentence shall not apply to a work referred to in article 10(1) sub 12, unless that work is part of a data carrier containing data and serves exclusively to make the said data accessible.
- Congregational singing and the instrumental accompaniment thereof during a religious service shall not be deemed an infringement of the copyright in a literary or artistic work.
- The reproduction of a portrait by or on behalf of the person portrayed or, after his death, by or on behalf of his relatives, shall not be deemed an infringement of copyright.

=== Private copy ===
In certain circumstances, one is allowed to make a copy of copyright materials. This is also called a home copy. According to Dutch Auteurswet article 16b and 16c § 1, and Wet op de Naburige rechten article 10, 'reproducing a piece of literature, science or art' is not seen as infringement to copyright if in line with the following:

1. The home copy is not, direct or indirect, means for monetary gain;
2. The copy serves exclusively to own practice, study or use;
3. The number of copies are limited, or the creator of additional copies compensates the holder.

On 10 April 2014 the European Court of Justice ruled the Dutch exclusion for home-copying to be infringing the directive 2001/29/EG – article 5 § 2- b and § 5. According to EU directive, this makes home-copying unlawful. There have been other cases in which Dutch Auteurswet has been ruled unlawful. The Netherlands however has not changed said article nor complied to the request to make prosecuting those whom home copy possible.

== History ==
Historically, governments issued monopolierechten (monopoly-rights) to publishers for the sale of printed work. Great Britain was the first to change this in 1710, with the Statute of Anne, which stated that authors, not publishers, had the right to claim a monopoly on the work. It also entailed protection for buyers of printed work in that publishers were no longer allowed to control the use of sold works. Furthermore, it limited exclusive rights to 28 years, after which the work or works would be released to the public domain.

In 1817, the first copyright legislation (Auteurswet) introduced, then later extended in 1881, 1912 and 2008, respectively.

The Berne Convention in 1886, was the first multilateral treaty to provide for reciprocal treatment of copyrights among sovereign nations. Under the Berne Convention the right of ownership (eigendomsrecht in Dutch) was automatically granted to every creative work. The author no longer needed to register the work, and was not required to apply for copyright coverage.

The Berne Convention is still in effect today. When a work is finished (defined as being written or recorded on a physical medium), the author automatically receives all exclusive rights for that work as well as derivatives, unless and until the author explicitly renounces those rights or the copyright expires. The expiration time differs from country to country, but according to the Berne Convention the minimum duration is the lifetime of the author plus 50 years.

== See also ==
- Law firms of the Netherlands
