= Old North Meeting House =

Old North Meeting House may refer to:

- Old North Meeting House, alternate name of Rockingham Meeting House, a historic civic and religious building in Rockingham, Vermont, built c. 1801
- Old North Meeting House, two former religious buildings used by the Second Church, Boston, congregation during 1649–1776

== See also ==
- Old North Church, an Episcopal mission church located in Boston, Massachusetts, built in 1723
