= Rebecca Lane Hooper Eastman =

American novelist

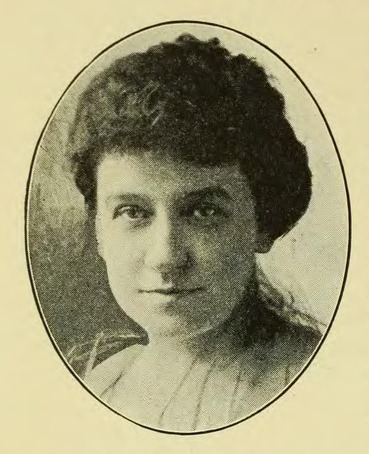
- Born: March 23, 1877; Walpole
- Died: June 10, 1937; Brooklyn
- Father: Franklin Hooper

Rebecca Lane Hooper Eastman (March 23, 1877 – 1937) was an American suffragist, journalist, and author of short stories. She is known for her 1917 novel The Big Little Person: A Romance, which was adapted for the 1919 silent film The Big Little Person.

== Biography ==
Born in Walpole, N.H. in 1877 Rebecca Lane Hooper was the daughter of Franklin William Hooper and Martha Holden Hooper. Rebecca Hooper graduated from Radcliffe College in 1900. She married William Franklin Eastman on July 27, 1912; the couple had a daughter, Eleanor Hooper Eastman. Rebecca Hooper Eastman wrote stories for The Saturday Evening Post, Good Housekeeping, McClure's, The Century, and Munsey's, articles for various newspapers, eight plays, and, in collaboration with Mabel Daniels of Brookline, Massachusetts, three operettas. She was a member of the College Equal Suffrage League. In 1937 at age 60 Rebecca Hooper Eastman died suddenly and unexpectedly in Walpole one week after her daughter was married in Walpole to Lt. Jay Alan Abercrombie, a June 1937 graduate of the U. S. Military Academy. Rebecca Lane Hooper's granddaughter Amy Abercrombie found the manuscript for her grandmother's novel The Other House, typed it, had it published, and then adapted the novel into an independent movie which premiered on June 26, 2010.

== Selected works ==
- The Big Little Person: A Romance, 1917
