= Frances Grimes =

American sculptor (1869–1963)

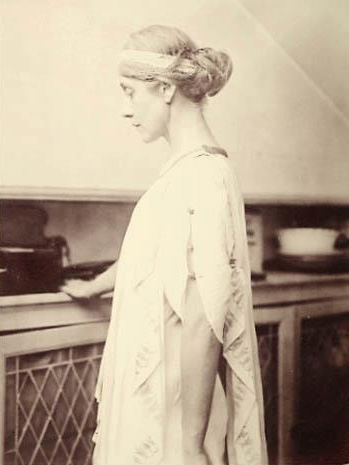
- Born: Frances Taft Grimes; January 25, 1869; Braceville Township, Ohio, U.S.
- Died: November 9, 1963 (aged 94); New York City, U.S.
- Education: Pratt Institute
- Known for: Sculptor, teacher
- Notable work: Girls Singing (Metropolitan Museum of Art); The Legend of Sleepy Hollow

Frances Taft Grimes (25 January 1869 – 9 November 1963) was an American sculptor, best remembered for her bas-relief portraits and busts.

== Biography ==
Grimes was born in Braceville Township, Ohio, the daughter of two physicians, and grew up in Decatur, Illinois. After attending local schools, she operated a sculpture studio in Decatur for about two years, before moving to Brooklyn, New York City to study at the Pratt Institute.

Following graduation from Pratt, she worked from 1894 to 1900 as the assistant to her former teacher, sculptor Herbert Adams, who called her "the best marble-cutter in America". During the summers, she joined Adams and his wife, Adeline, at the Cornish, New Hampshire art colony. It was there that she met sculptor Augustus Saint Gaudens, who persuaded her to join him as his full-time studio assistant.

Grimes worked with the terminally-ill Saint Gaudens from 1900 to his death in 1907. She stayed on at Saint Gauden's studio to finish several of his commissions, including the Phillips Brooks Memorial at Trinity Church in Boston, Massachusetts (dedicated 1910); and eight larger-than-life caryatids for the Albright-Knox Art Gallery in Buffalo, New York, which she executed from his sketch models. She recorded her experiences at Cornish in her unpublished "Reminiscences" (Special Collections, Dartmouth College Library). Following six months in France, Italy and Greece, she moved to New York City in 1908, taking a studio on Macdougal Alley in Greenwich Village.

A strong advocate of voting rights for women, Grimes served as marshal of the Sculptors division in the 25,000-woman October 23, 1915 Women's Suffrage Parade in New York City.

=== Sleepy Hollow panel ===
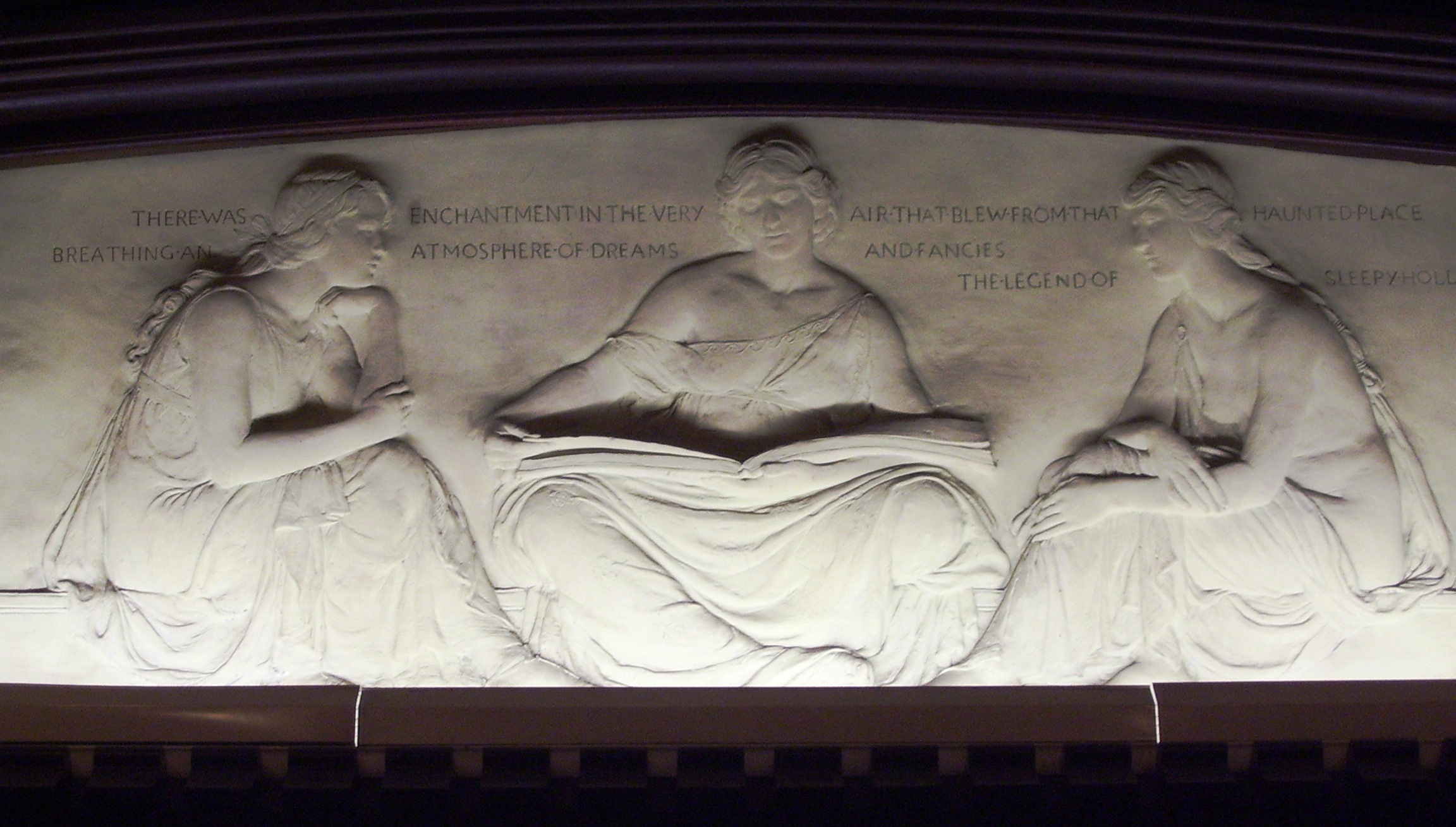
The Legend of Sleepy Hollow (1916), Washington Irving High School, New York City

Grimes had a major success with her bas-relief panel The Legend of Sleepy Hollow (1915). Designed as an overmantel for the lobby of the all-girls Washington Irving High School in New York City, it features three life-sized female seated figures reading Irving's classic story. Critic Adeline Adams saluted the work in the magazine Art and Progress:

"For me, this relief remains a most satisfying example of modern American sculpture. It delights because of the fitness of the theme and treatment to the purpose specified, the architectural strength of the design, the dignity, delicacy and sureness of the modeling, the harmonious rhythms of the figures and draperies; in short, because of its general state of grace as a modern classic."

=== Girls Singing panels ===
In 1916, Joseph Parsons commissioned Grimes to create two bas-relief panels to flank a fountain at his country house in Lakeville, Connecticut. Each panel featured a nude seated young woman, one holding a dogwood branch and the other holding a Chinese lute, who share a joyful over-the-shoulder glance. The reliefs were completed in plaster in 1917, and carved in marble by Amadeo Merli and Alexandro Nicolai. In December 1917, the panels were part of the "Allies for Sculpture" exhibition at New York's Ritz-Carlton Hotel, the proceeds of which went toward aiding World War I refugees and prisoners of war. Daniel Chester French saw the panels, and asked Grimes to lend them for a 1918 exhibition of contemporary sculpture at the Metropolitan Museum of Art. The marble panels remained on loan to MMA until 1944, when Parsons donated them to the museum.

=== Exhibitions, honors and awards ===
Grimes worked in bronze and marble. She exhibited at the Pennsylvania Academy of the Fine Arts: 1907, 1911–13, 1915–16, 1924, 1933. She exhibited regularly at the National Sculpture Society, whose 1929 catalog states that her work included "many bas-relief portraits, and busts, especially of children."

Grimes was elected a member of the National Sculpture Society in 1912, and a member emeritus in 1961. She was elected an Associate member of the National Academy of Design in 1931, and a full Academician in 1945. She was also a member of National Association of Women Artists and of the American Federation of Arts.

She was awarded a Silver Medal for numismatic design at the 1915 Panama-Pacific International Exposition in San Francisco. She received the 1916 McMillan Sculpture Prize from the National Association of Women Painters and Sculptors. She was awarded the 1920 National Association Medal of Sculpture from the National Association of Women Painters and Sculptors.

Grimes died at age 94 in New York City in November 1963. The following summer, a memorial exhibition of her sculpture was held at Saint-Gaudens National Historic Site in Cornish, New Hampshire.

== Selected works ==
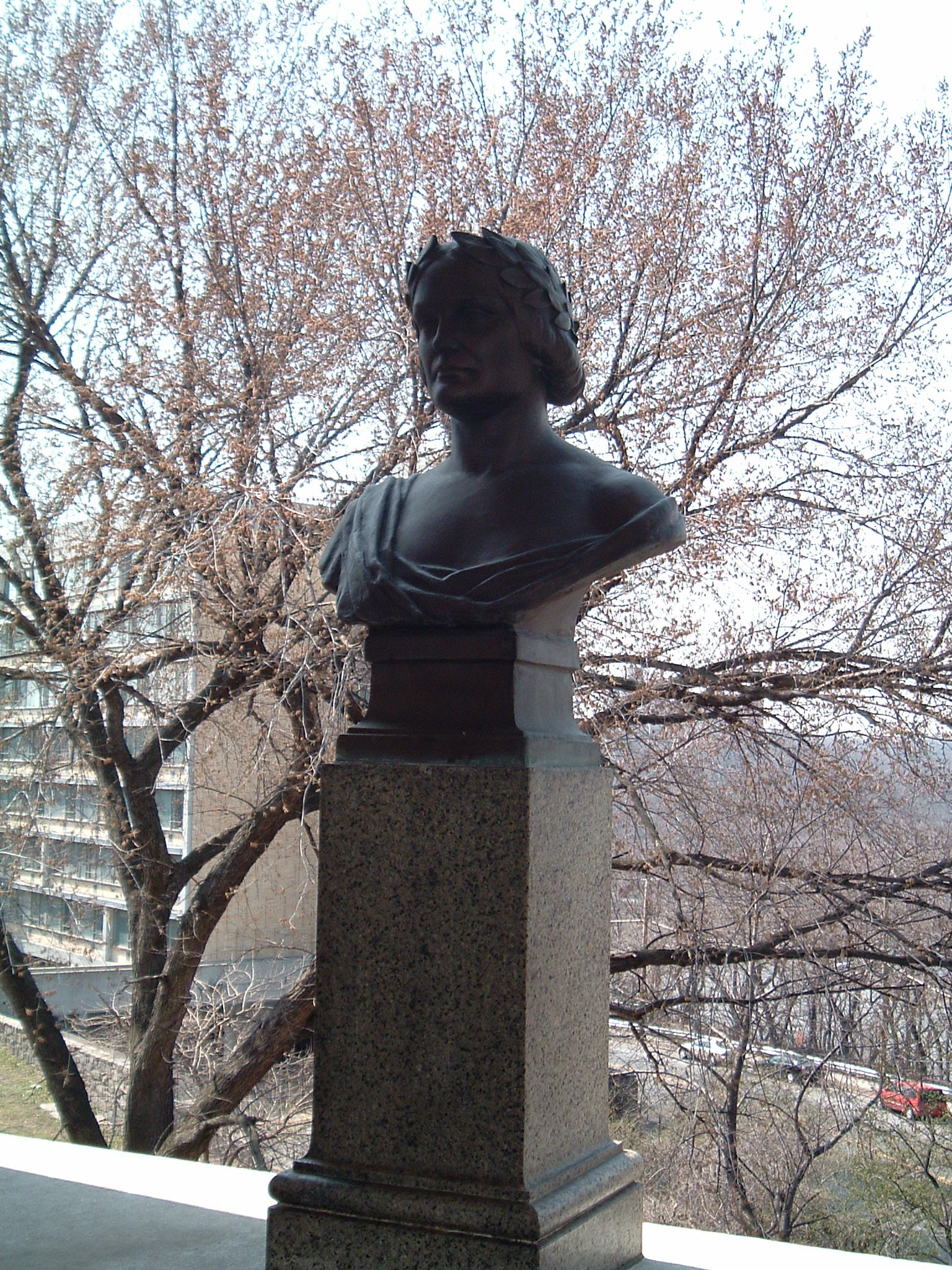
Bust of Charlotte Cushman (1925), Hall of Fame for Great Americans, Bronx, New York City.

- Relief portrait: Arthur Whiting (bronze, 1907), Music Division, New York Public Library for the Performing Arts, Lincoln Center, New York City.
- Bust: Bishop Henry C. Potter (marble, 1911), Grace Episcopal Church, New York City.
- Boy with Duck (bronze, 1912), Toledo Museum of Art, Toledo, Ohio. Other casts are at the Strong Museum in Rochester, New York, and elsewhere.
- Girl by Pool (bronze, 1913), Toledo Museum of Art, Toledo, Ohio. A larger version in marble is at Brookgreen Gardens in Murrells Inlet, South Carolina.
- Relief portrait: General Jacob D. Cox Memorial Tablet (bronze, 1915), Administration Building, Oberlin College, Oberlin, Ohio, collaboration with muralist Kenyon Cox (Gen. Cox's son).
- Relief panel: The Legend of Sleepy Hollow (plaster, 1915), Washington Irving High School, New York City.
- Relief panels: Girls Singing (marble, 1916–17), Metropolitan Museum of Art, New York City.
- Relief portrait: Charles Otis Whitman Memorial Tablet (1918), Marine Biological Laboratory, Woods Hole, Massachusetts
- Relief portrait: Mrs. Sarah Elizabeth Pearsons (1919), Decatur Memorial Hospital, Decatur, Illinois.
- Relief portrait: Dr. William Barnes, (1919), Decatur Memorial Hospital, Decatur, Illinois.
- Bust: Charlotte Cushman (bronze, 1925), Hall of Fame for Great Americans, Bronx, New York City.
- Bust: Emma Willard (bronze, 1929), Hall of Fame for Great Americans, Bronx, New York City.
- Chi Omega National Achievement Medal (gold, 1930). Grimes designed the sorority's gold medal – awarded 1930 to 1958 – and was the first recipient of it.
- Relief portrait: Lt. General Nelson A. Miles Memorial Tablet (1931), Washington National Cathedral, Washington, D.C.
