= Edmond Thomas Quinn =

American sculptor and painter (1868–1929)

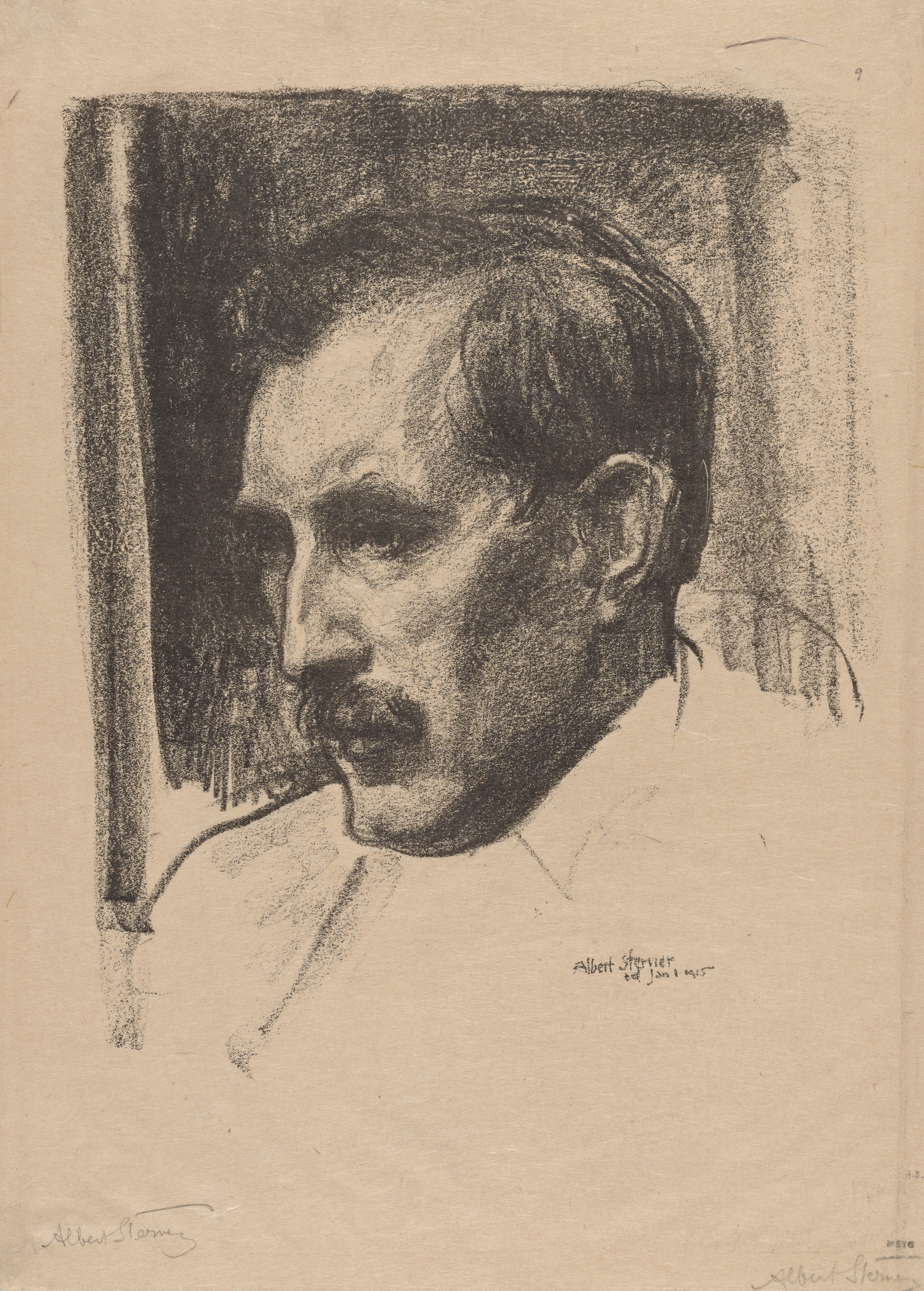
- Edmond T. Quinn (1915) 1915 by Albert Sterner
- Born: Edmond Thomas Quinn; December 20, 1868; Philadelphia, Pennsylvania
- Died: September 9, 1929 (aged 60); New York, New York
- Resting place: Island Cemetery, Newport, Rhode Island
- Occupations: Painter; Sculptor
- Years active: 1891–1929
- Relatives: Emily Bradley Quinn (wife)

Edmond Thomas Quinn (December 20, 1868 – September 9, 1929) was an American sculptor active from the Gilded Age to the Jazz Age, with work in the collections of the Metropolitan Museum of Art, National Portrait Gallery, Whitney Museum of American Art, and the National Gallery of Ireland. Among his sitters were Playwright Eugene O'Neill, Painter Leon Kroll, and architect Cass Gilbert. Among his outdoor sculptures visible today are Edwin Booth as Hamlet in Gramercy Park, composer Victor Herbert near the Naumburg Bandshell on the Central Park Mall, and baseball pioneer Harry Wright.

== Education ==
Quinn was born December 20, 1868, in Philadelphia, to John and Rosina McLaughlin Quinn. He studied painting at the Pennsylvania Academy of Fine Arts under Thomas Eakins. Following Eakins's February 1886 forced-resignation from PAFA, Quinn followed him to the Art Students League of Philadelphia, and later became that short-lived school's curator. In Paris he trained for a time as a sculptor in the studio of Jean Antoine Injalbert.

== Career ==
He exhibited regularly at the National Academy of Design, showing paintings in 1891, 1893, 1905, 1906 and 1907. He first showed his sculpture there in 1908, and annually for many years, usually portrait busts. He won a silver medal for his bronze sculpture of model Audrey Munson at the Panama-Pacific Exposition, San Francisco, 1915. He also exhibited at the Pennsylvania Academy of Fine Arts (paintings: 1891, 1894, 1897; sculptures: 1899, 1901, 1905–06, 1908–10, 1914–16, 1921, 1923, 1925–26, 1928, posthumously 1930), and the Art Institute of Chicago.

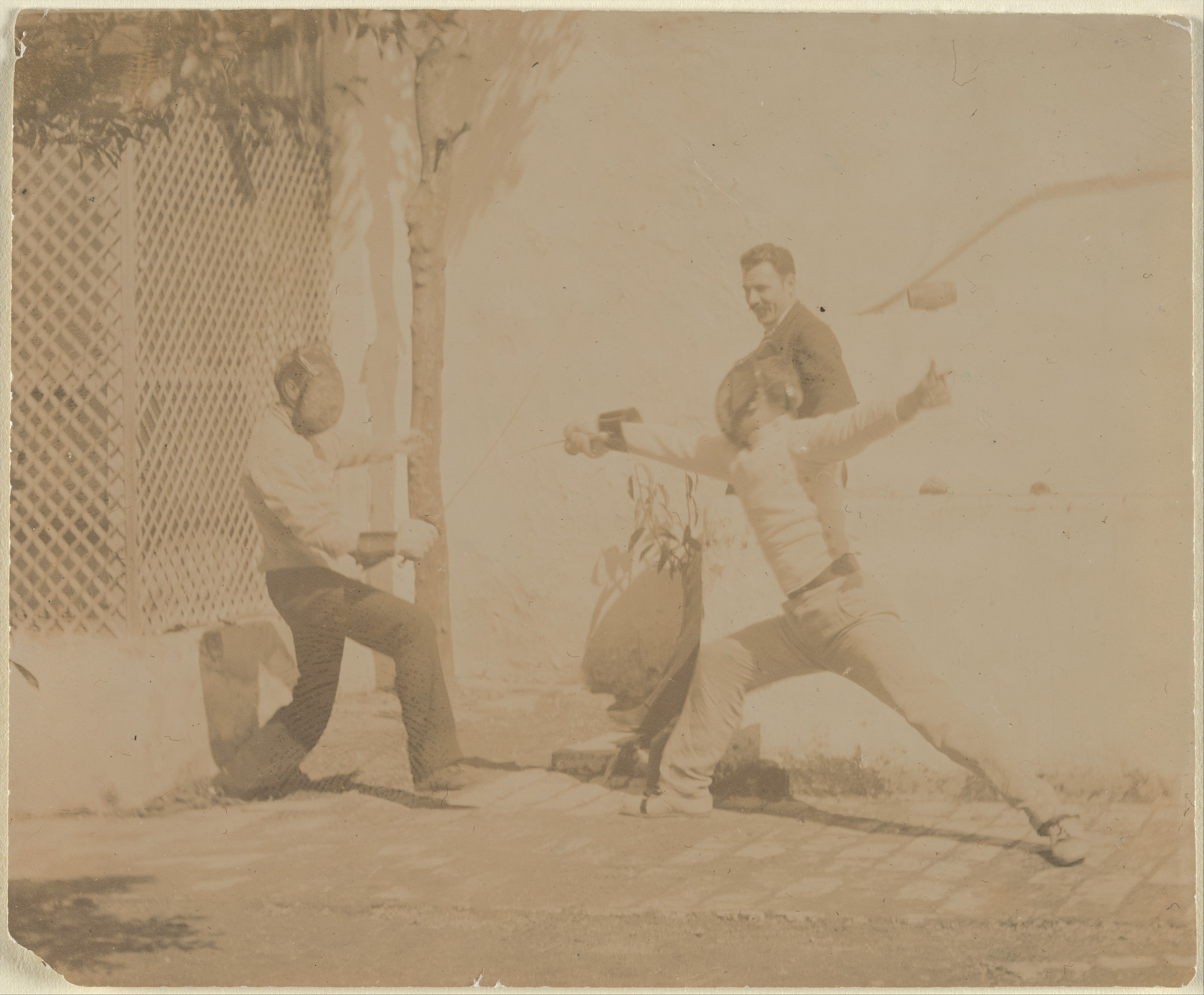
Edmond Quinn with Two Fencers (1880s), Circle of Thomas Eakins

He was elected an Associate of the National Academy of Design in 1920, and was a member of the National Sculpture Society, the Century Association, the American Academy of Arts and Letters, and the Players Club, for whom he executed his statue of Booth.

Quinn was recognized as being a fine portraitist whose work "shows taste and conscience." His portrait busts include Franklin Hooper, Sylvester Malone, Edwin Markham, Vicente Blasco Ibáñez, Padraic Colum and Eugene O'Neill. His half-length, oil-on-canvas portrait of Attilio Piccirilli, the sculptor whose studio executed many works of American Beaux-Arts masters, is in the National Academy of Design, as are his painted portraits of Furio Piccirilli and Sherry E. Fry. The National Portrait Gallery has a large number of his portrait busts.

== Death ==
In May 1929, Quinn tried to kill himself by drinking poison. He was found drowned off Governors Island, New York City in September 1929, a suicide.

Quinn's papers are at Yale University.

== Selected works ==
Year	Image	Subject	Place	Location
1897		Baseball pioneer Harry Wright	West Laurel Hill Cemetery	Bala Cynwyd, Pennsylvania
1905		Mayor William Howard	William Howard Memorial Chapel	Williamsport, Pennsylvania
1908		Author Edgar Allan Poe (bust)	Poe Cottage	The Bronx, New York
1908		Author Edgar Allan Poe (plaster model)	Poe Museum	Richmond, Virginia
1908		Revolutionary War Memorial (bas relief)	Kings Mountain National Military Park	Blacksburg, South Carolina
1910		Zoroaster	Brooklyn Museum (east facade)	Brooklyn, New York
1911		Interior Sculptures	Pittsburgh Athletic Association Building	Pittsburgh, Pennsylanvia
1912		Figure of a Nymph	Metropolitan Museum of Art	New York, New York
1912		Attorney J. Edward Swanstrom (relief)	Columbus Park (removed)	Brooklyn, New York
1915		General Winfield S. Featherston (bust)	Vicksburg National Military Park (outside)	Warren County, Mississippi
1917		General John C. Pemberton	Pemberton Circle	Vicksburg, Mississippi
1918		Actor Edwin Booth	Gramercy Park	New York, New York
1920		Professor Franklin W. Hooper (bust)	Brooklyn Museum	Brooklyn, New York
1921		Victory, Great War Memorial	Faneuil Park	New Rochelle, New York
1922		Playwright Eugene O'Neill (bust)	National Portrait Gallery	Washington, D.C.
1924		Painter Leon Kroll (bust)	Whitney Museum of American Art	New York, New York
1925		Poet Padraic Colum (bust)	Hugh Lane Gallery	Dublin, Ireland
c1925		Poet and Novelist James Stephens (bust)	National Gallery of Ireland	Dublin, Ireland
1926		Actor Edwin Booth (bust)	Hall of Fame for Great Americans	The Bronx, New York
1926		Chancellor James Kent (bust)	Hall of Fame for Great Americans	The Bronx, New York
1926		Architect Cass Gilbert	Minnesota State Capitol	St. Paul, Minnesota
1927		Composer-Conductor Victor Herbert (bust)	Central Park Mall	New York, New York
1927		Fire Chief William Francis Kenny (bas relief)	Unknown	
1927		Congressman Henry Clay	National Capitol Park	Caracas, Venezuela
1928		Painter James McNeill Whistler (bust)	Hall of Remembrance, New York University	New York, New York
1929		Dr. J. Marion Sims (bust)	State Office Building	Columbia, South Carolina
1929		Judge Oliver Wendell Holmes Jr. (bust)	Hall of Fame for Great Americans	The Bronx, New York
1930		Founding Father John Quincy Adams (bust)	Hall of Fame for Great Americans	The Bronx, New York

Paintings

Year	Subject	Place	Location	
1895		Clown	La Salle University Art Museum	Philadelphia, Pennsylvania
1911		Portrait of Attilio Piccirilli	National Academy of Design	New York, New York
1915		Portrait of Sherry Edmundson Fry	National Academy of Design	New York, New York
1919		Portrait of Furio Piccirilli	National Academy of Design	New York, New York

== Gallery ==
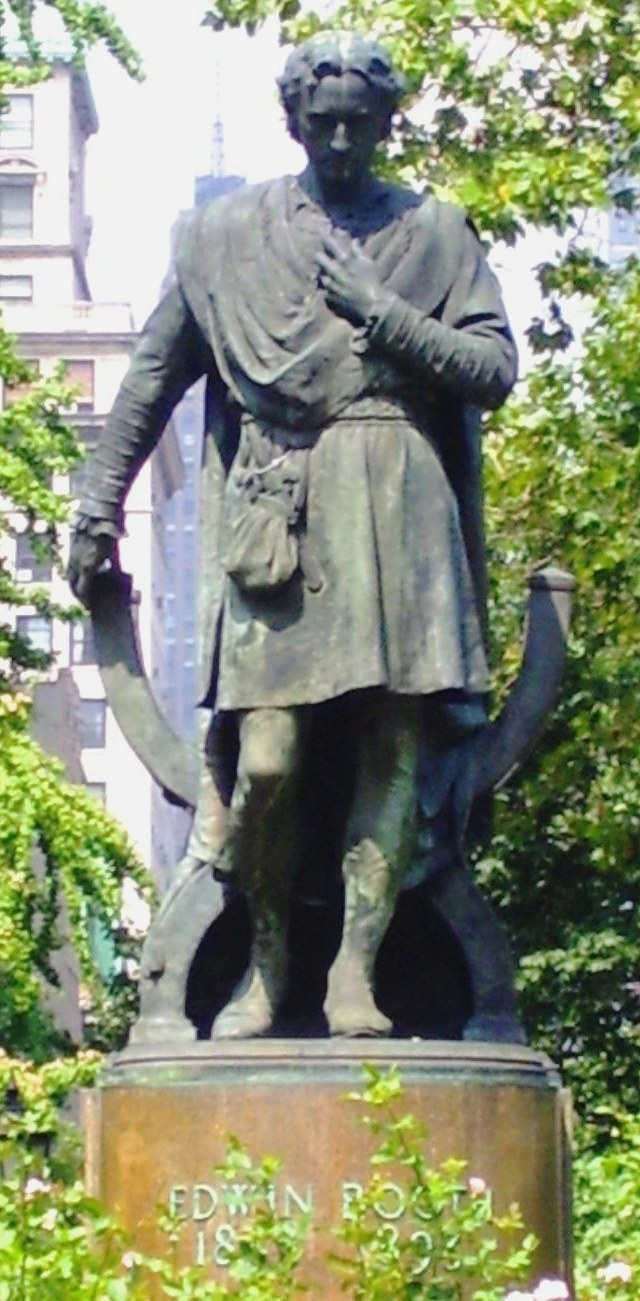
Actor Edwin Booth (1918), Gramercy Park, New York City.

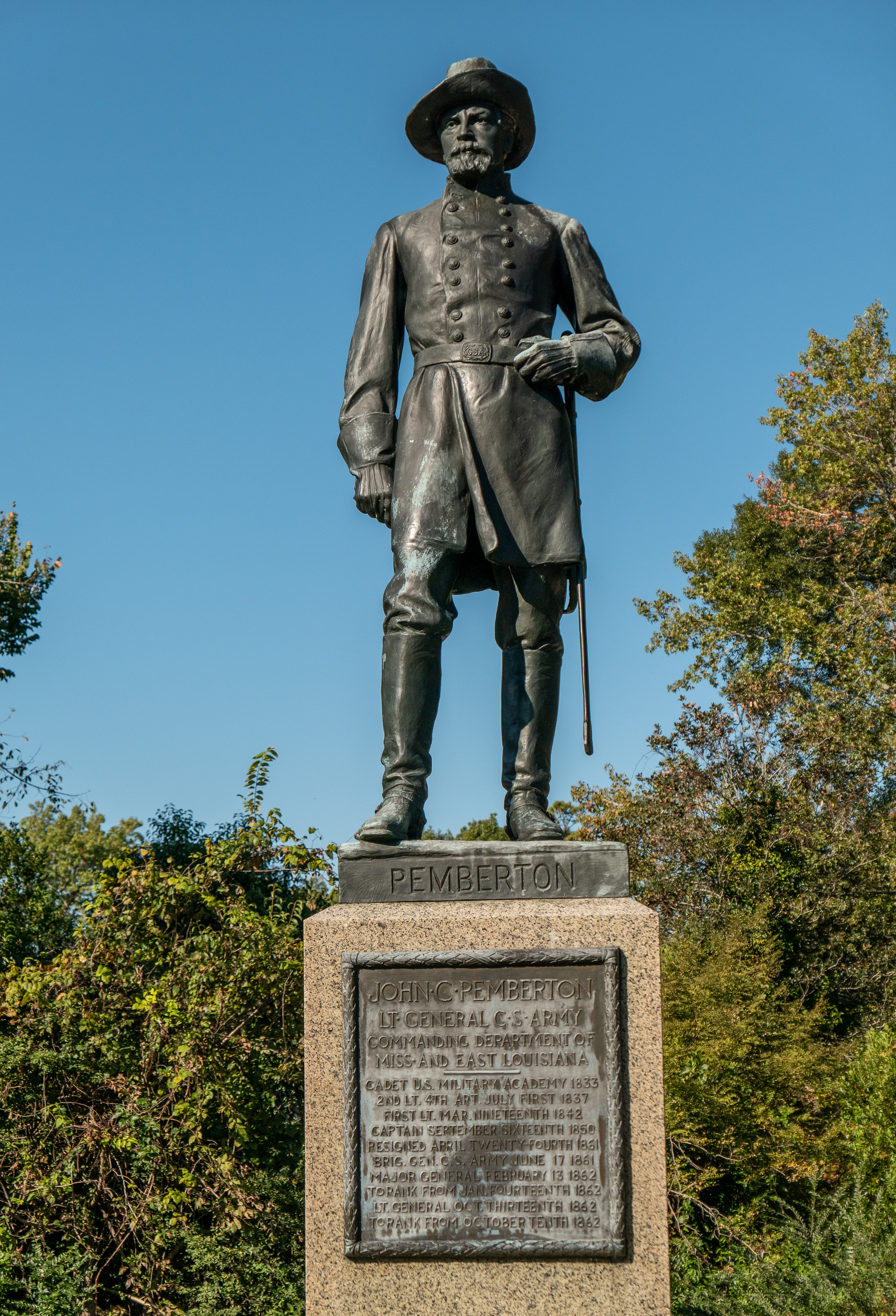
General John C. Pemberton (1917), Vicksburg National Military Park, Vicksburg, Mississippi.

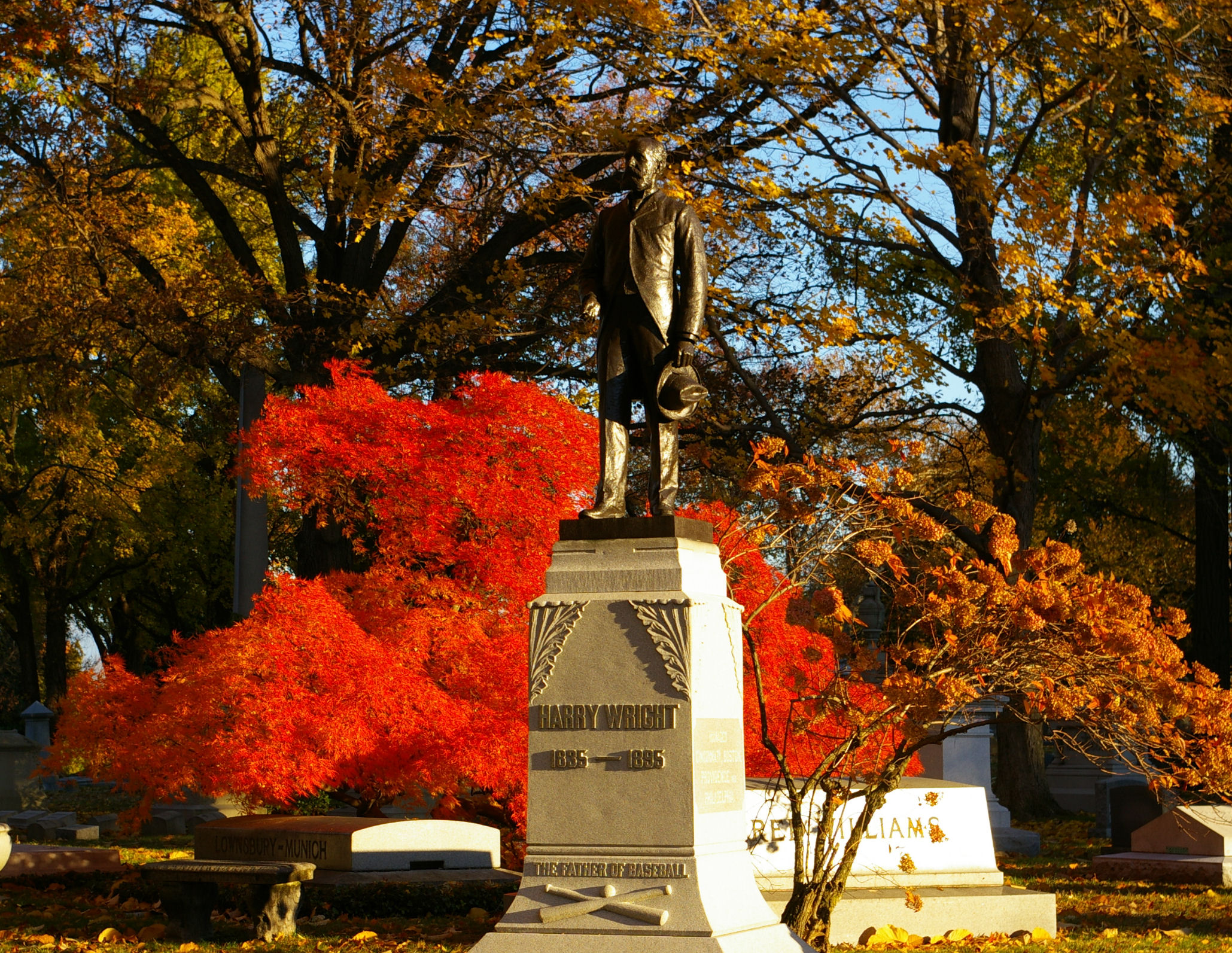
Harry Wright Monument (1897), West Laurel Hill Cemetery, Bala Cynwydd, Pennsylvania.

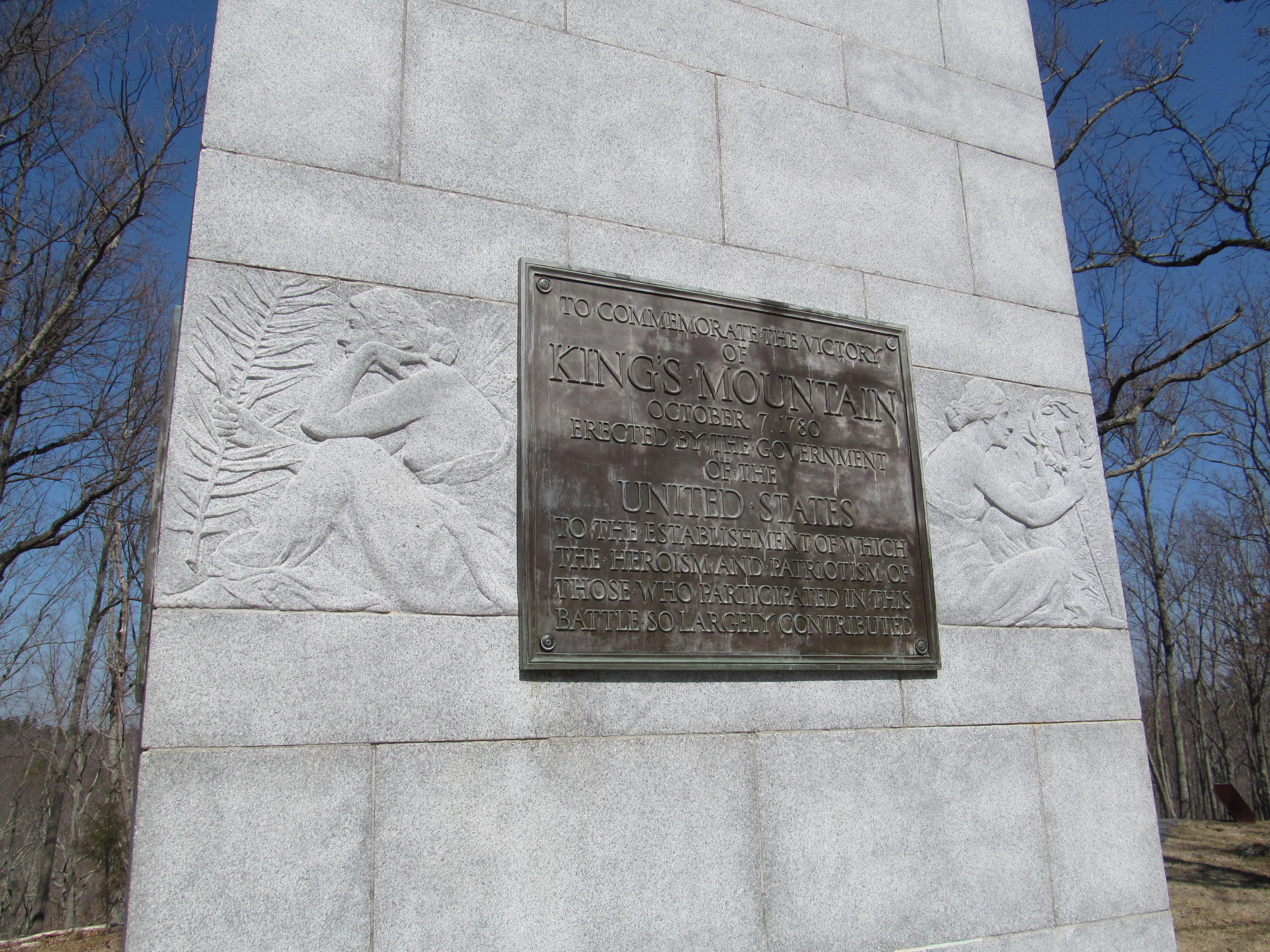
Bas reliefs (1908), King's Mountain Battle Monument, South Carolina.

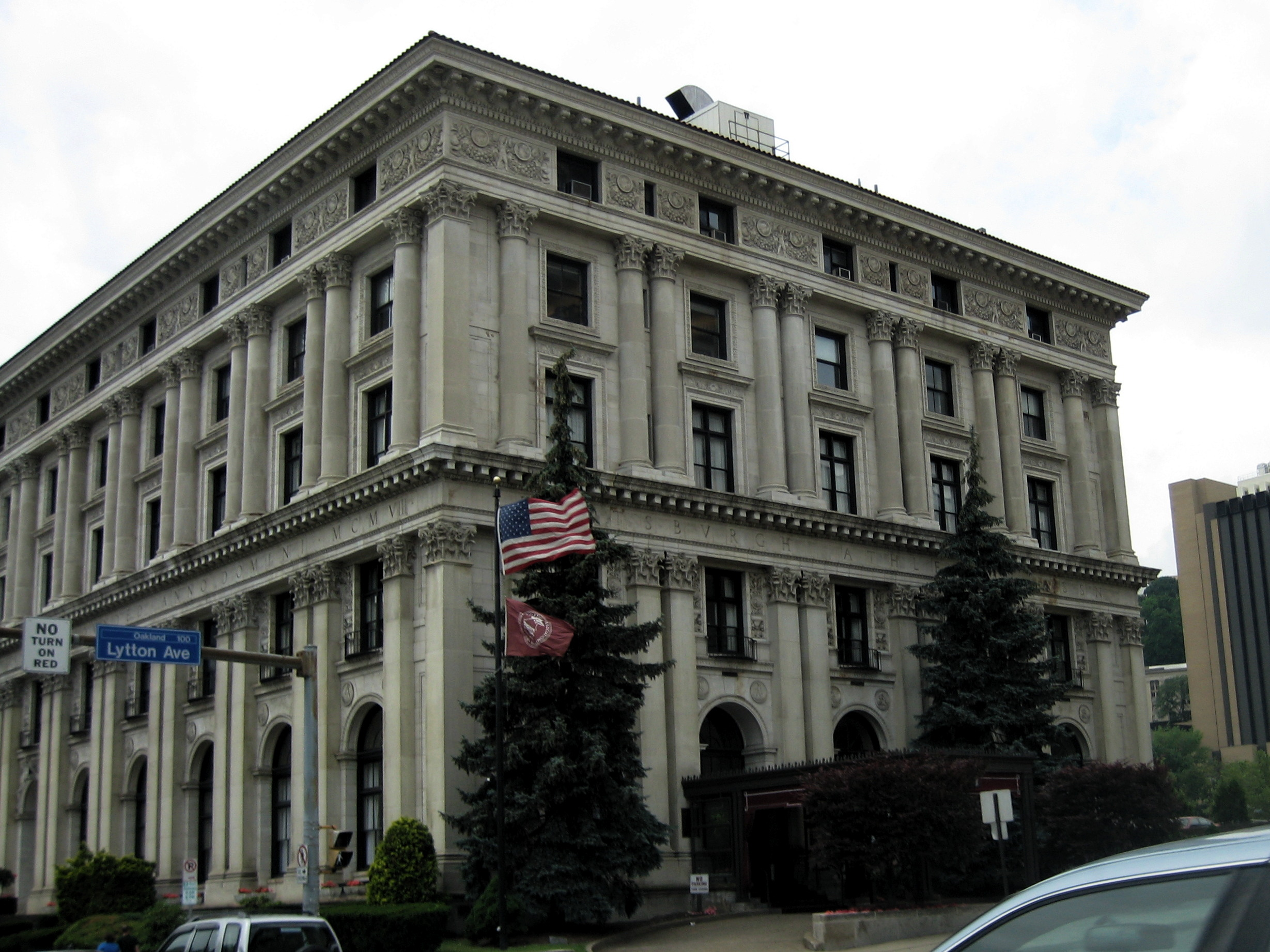
Pittsburgh Athletic Association (1911), Pittsburgh, Pennsylvania.

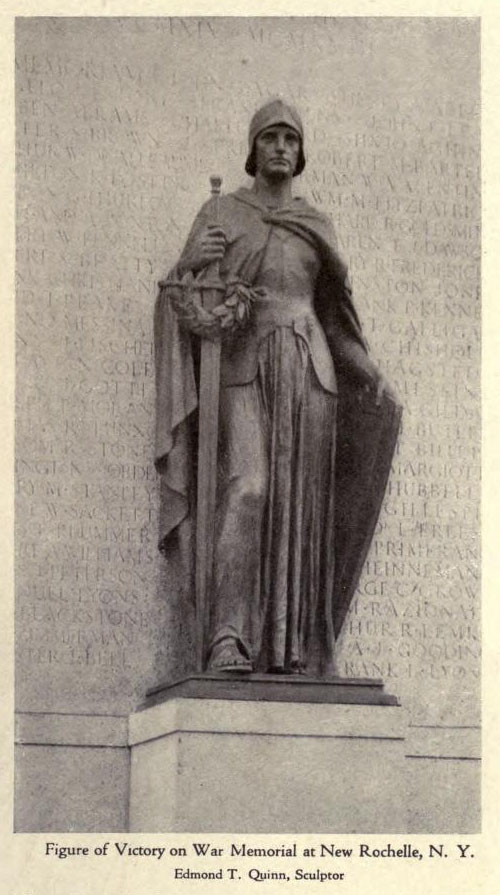
Victory (1921), World War I Memorial, New Rochelle, New York.

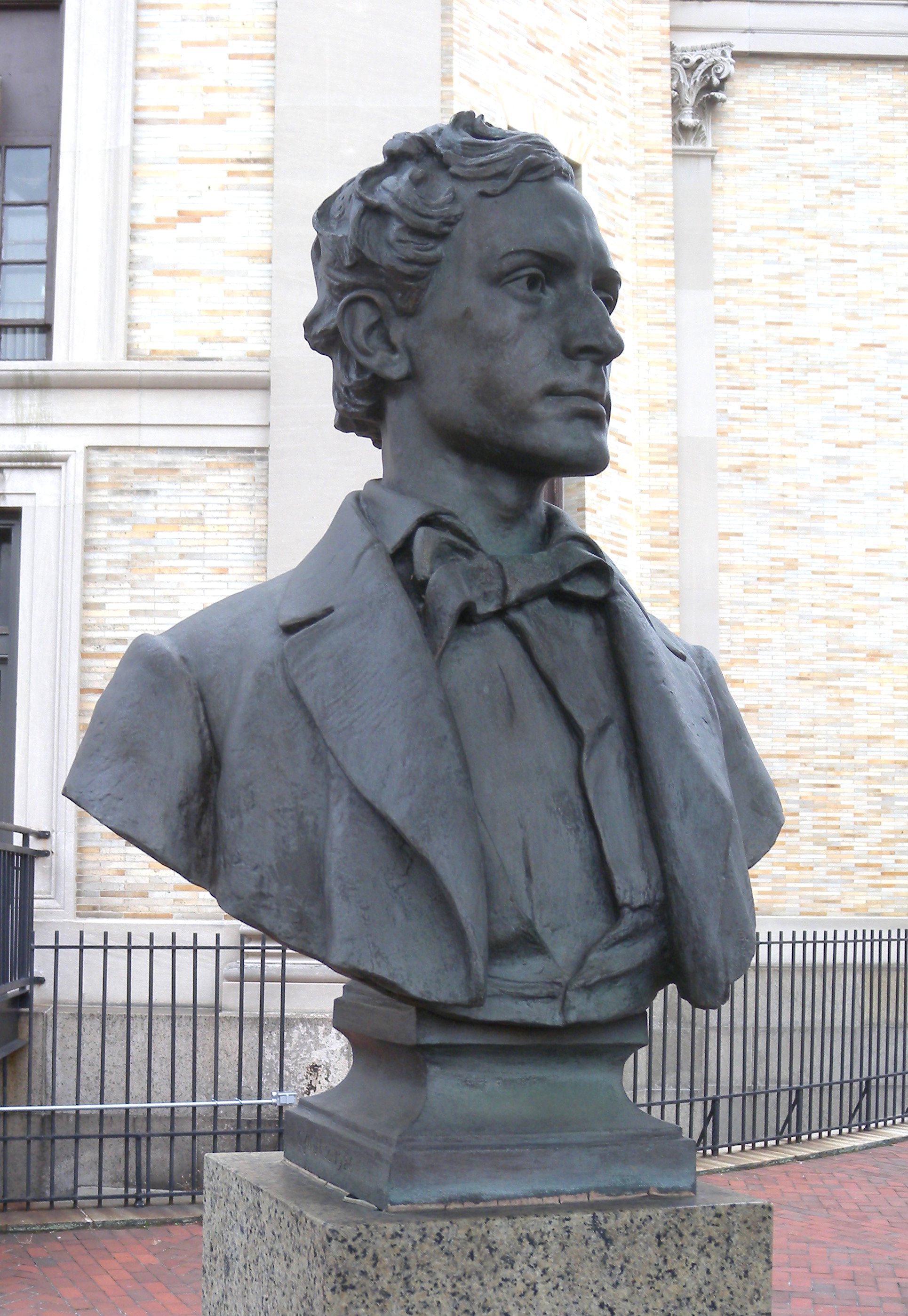
Edwin Booth (1926), Hall of Fame for Great Americans, Bronx, New York City.

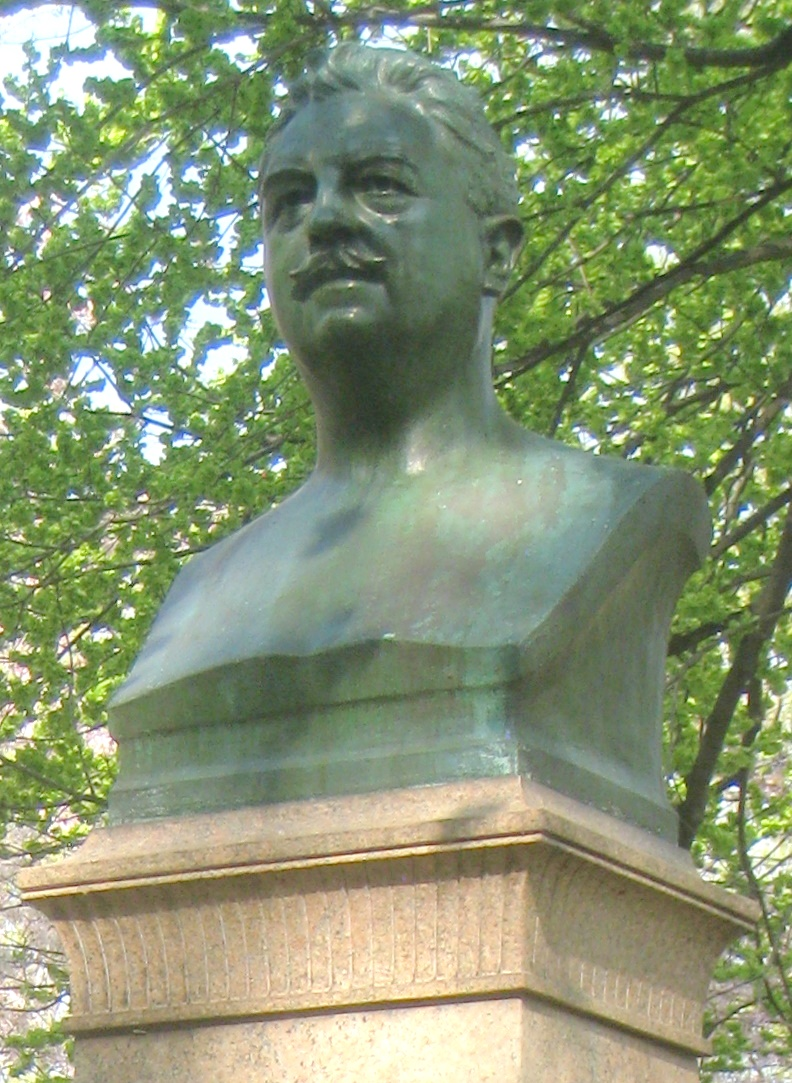
Victor Herbert (1927), Central Park, New York City.

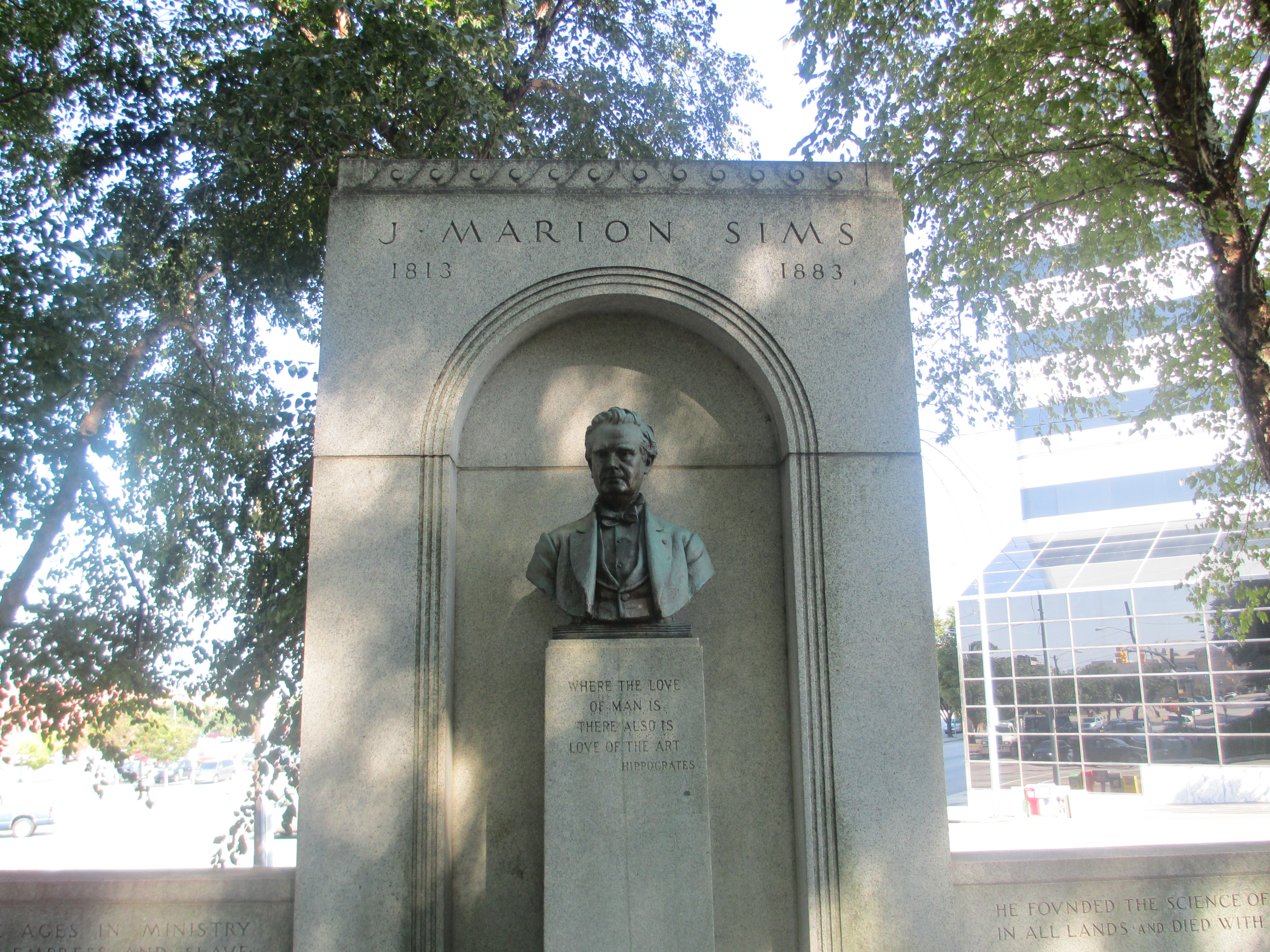
Dr. J. Marion Sims (1929), Columbia, South Carolina.
