= Franklin Hooper =

American biologist, geologist, and educator

Franklin William Hooper
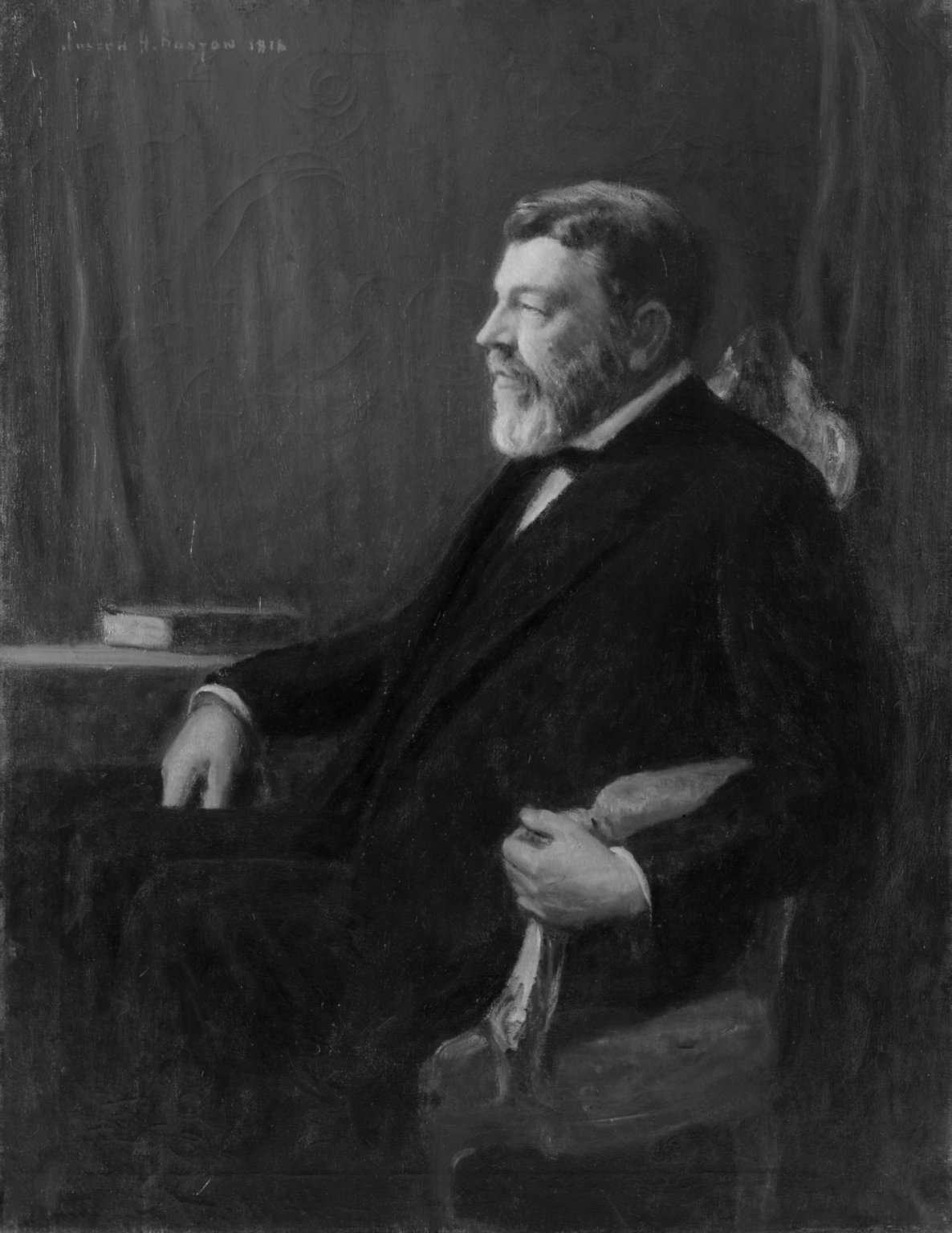
- 1916 portrait of Franklin W. Hooper by Joseph Henry Boston, from the collection of the Brooklyn Museum
- Born: Walpole, New Hampshire
- Died: August 1, 1914 (aged 63); Walpole, New Hampshire
- Education: Antioch College, Harvard University
- Scientific career
- Fields: biology, geology, chemistry
- Workplaces: Smithsonian Institution, Brooklyn Institute of Arts and Sciences, Brooklyn Museum

Franklin William Hooper, LL.D. (11 February 1851 – 1 August 1914) was an American biologist, geologist, educator and institute director.

== Life and work ==
He was born in Walpole, New Hampshire, the son of William Hooper and Elvira Pulsifer Hopper, and grew up on his parents' farm. After local schooling he studied at Antioch College, Yellow Springs, Ohio, from 1867–1871, and in 1872 enrolled at Harvard University to study biological sciences, where Louis Agassiz and Asa Gray were among his professors. He participated in the first biological summer school at the short-lived Anderson School of Natural History, founded by Agassiz in 1873 on Penikese Island, Cape Cod. After graduating with a B.A. in 1875 (Hon. M.A. 1897) he worked for the Smithsonian Institution to study algae and coralline formations in the Florida Keys.

After three years as head of the high school in Keene, New Hampshire, from 1877-1880, he was appointed professor of chemistry and geology at Adelphi College, Brooklyn, where he taught until 1889. He was the first president of the Brooklyn Ethical Association 1881–1883.

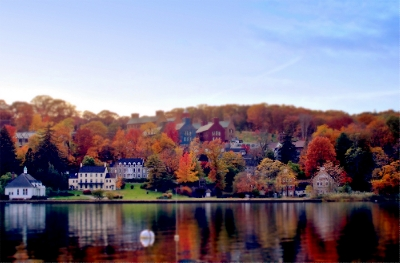
Cold Spring Harbor Laboratory, set up after a suggestion by Hooper

In 1889 he was appointed as General Director of the revitalised Brooklyn Institute of Arts and Sciences (BIAS), where he had been a Fellow, and (continuing the earlier example set by Agassiz) was instrumental in the founding of its summer school Biological Laboratory (Bio Lab) at Cold Spring Harbor, Long Island, in 1890.

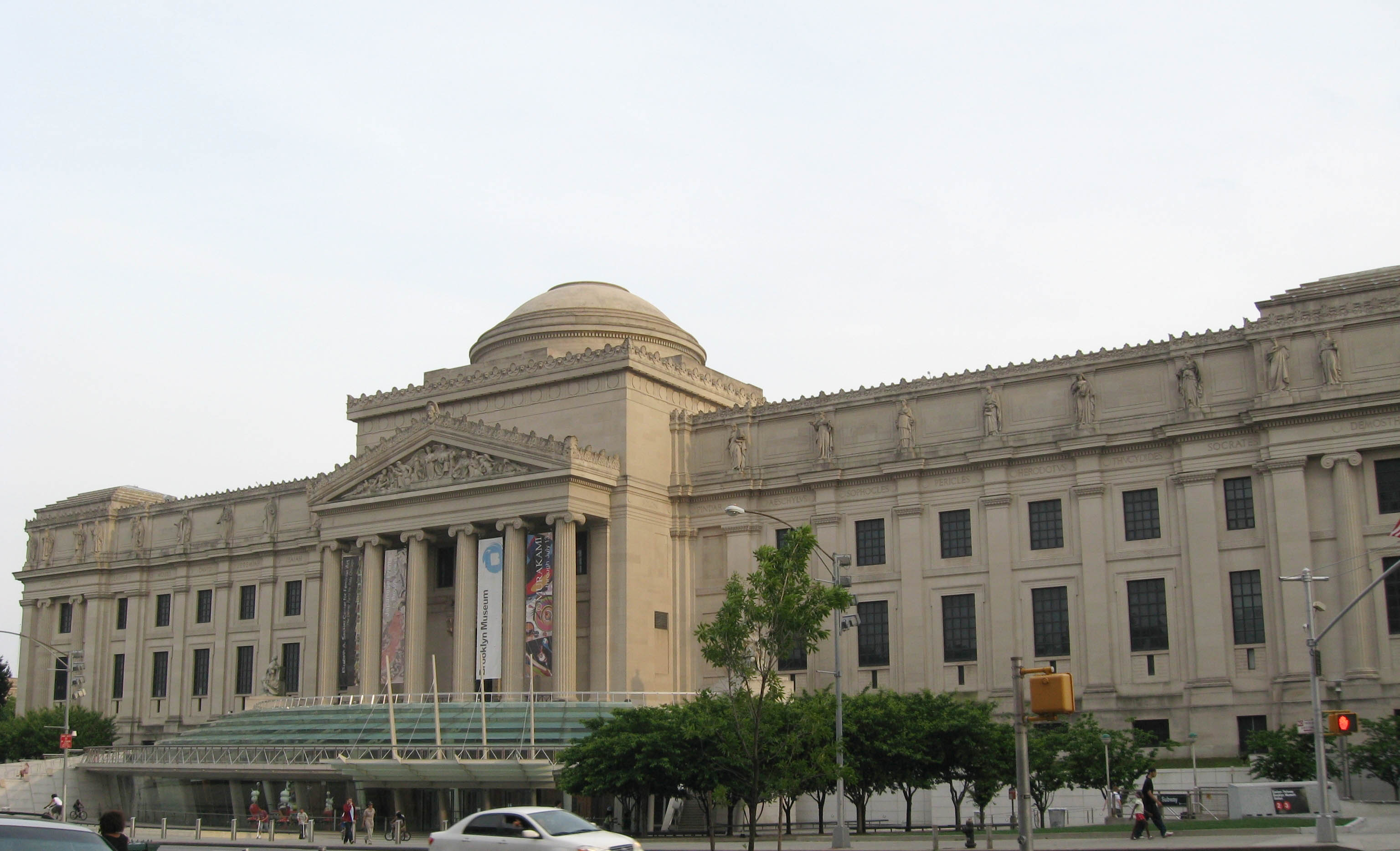
Hooper was the first director of the Brooklyn Museum 1899-1914.

Hooper greatly expanded the institute's work of presenting a wide range of public lectures and concerts, quadrupling its membership. One of the regular visiting orchestras to play at the institute was the Boston Symphony, whose founder married Agassiz' daughter.

The Brooklyn Museum will embrace all known human history, the infinite capacity of man to act, to think, and to love, and the many departments of science and of art which he has developed. Through its collections and its libraries it should be possible to read the history of the world.

— Franklin Hooper, at the laying of the cornerstone of the Brooklyn Museum, 1895

Under his leadership the institute's art and architecture departments were set up, leading to the competition to design the Brooklyn Institute's new museum (now the Brooklyn Museum), opened in 1897. Until his death in 1914 he continued as director of the institute and de facto director of the museum, and chairman of the Committee on Lectures. More departments were opened during his time as director, including the Brooklyn Children's Museum (1899) and the Brooklyn Botanic Garden (1911). He was a member of the New York City Board of Education and a trustee for the Brooklyn Public Library. He was president of the board of trustees of his alma mater, Antioch College, from 1901–05.

In 1904 Hooper was one of the founders of the American Bison Society with Ernest Harold Baynes. At his suggestion Baynes wrote to President Theodore Roosevelt, who became the society's first Honorary President. Hooper also suggested the inclusion of the Premier of Canada, Earl Grey, as an officer of the society. Hooper himself became the society's president in 1911.

Along with Hal B. Fullerton he was the main impetus behind the establishment in 1912 of the New York State School of Agriculture on Long Island.

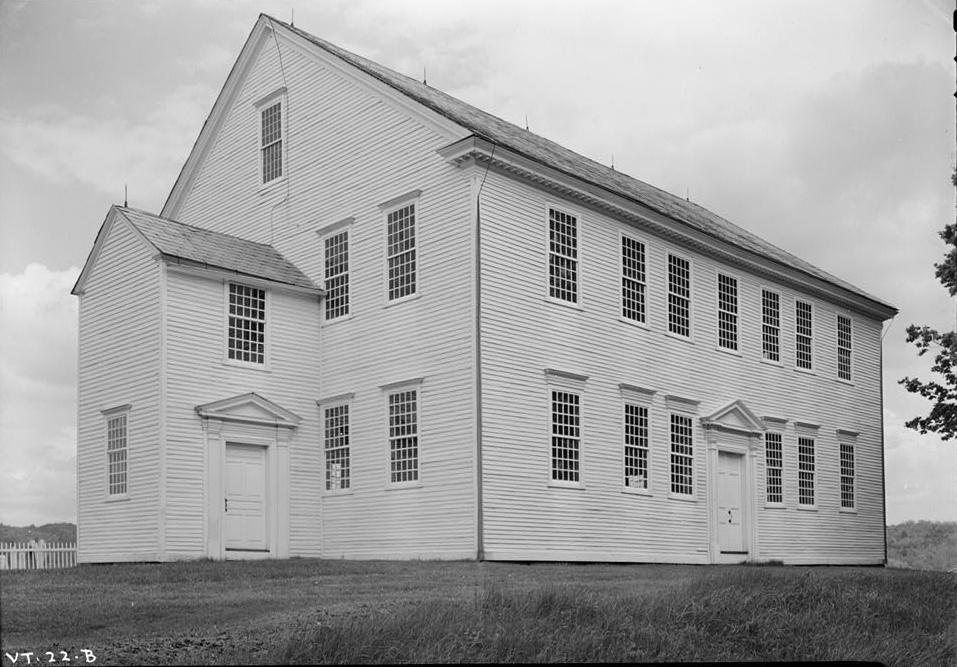
Rockingham Meeting House, Vermont, church of his forefathers

He was instrumental in setting up the Old Rockingham Meeting House Association in 1911, for the continued preservation of the newly restored Vermont church which his great-great grandfather David Pulsipher had helped to found in 1778.

Hooper's obituary in the Brooklyn Daily Eagle summed up his work: "No man ever did so much to dignify the position of the old City of Brooklyn, in the world of science and art, as Professor Franklin William Hooper ... For a quarter of a century his energetic activities have been given to the development of this institution which has become the pride of the city and a model for work in many other cities."

His bust by Edmond Thomas Quinn is at the Brooklyn Museum.

== Family life ==
He married Martha Holden of Augusta, Georgia, in 1877. She was the daughter of Peter B. Holden (superintendent of Augusta cotton factories) and Meritable Emery Holden, ardent abolitionists before and during the Civil War, whose house was part of the Underground Railroad for escaped slaves.

Martha Hooper was vice-president of the Brooklyn Institute's Domestic Science department in 1909. They had three children: Rebecca L. Hooper, born in Walpole, March 23, 1877, married William H. Eastman in July 1912; William S. Hooper, born in Keene, New Hampshire, June 1880; and Franklin Dana Hooper, born in Brooklyn, New York, October 30, 1883.

== Death ==
Hooper died August 1, 1914, in his family home in Walpole, New Hampshire
