= Rockingham Village Historic District =

Historic district in Vermont, United States

- U.S. National Register of Historic Places
- U.S. Historic district
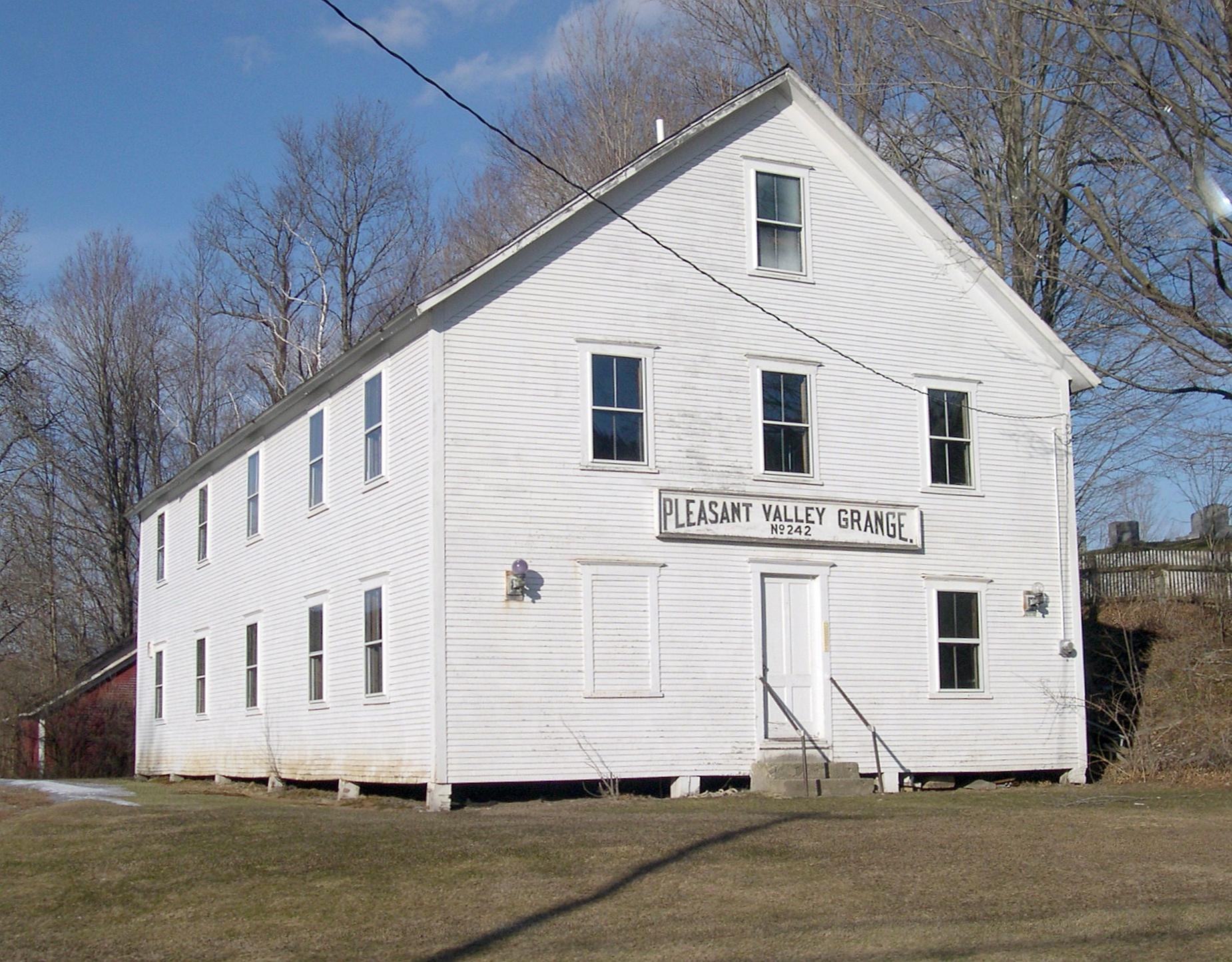
- The Pleasant Valley Grange

- Location within Vermont Location within the United States
- Location: Meeting House Rd., Rockingham Hill Rd., Rockingham, Vermont
- Coordinates: 43°11′17″N 72°29′20″W
- Area: 36.8 acres (14.9 ha)
- Built: 1908
- Architectural style: Georgian, Federal
- NRHP reference No.: 07001346
- Added to NRHP: January 4, 2008

The Rockingham Village Historic District encompasses the traditional village center of the town of Rockingham, Vermont. Settled in the 18th century, the district, located mainly on Meeting House Road off Vermont Route 103, includes a variety of 18th and 19th-century houses, and has been little altered since a fire in 1908. It notably includes the 18th-century National Historic Landmark Rockingham Meeting House. The district was listed on the National Register of Historic Places in 2008.

== Description and history ==
The town of Rockingham was chartered in 1753, but settlement did not begin until the 1760s. Its village center was laid out on a terrace overlooking the Williams River to the north, which is where its first meeting house, cemetery, and post office were established. The village soon became a major stop on the road that followed the river (now Vermont Route 103), and featured shops, taverns, a grist mill, and blacksmith shops. The village was overtaken by Bellows Falls in economic importance by the 1820s, and development was modest afterward. On April 14, 1908, many of the shops and homes in the Village were destroyed in a fire, but the recently restored Rockingham Meeting House was spared by the fire. Only a few new buildings (notably including the Grange hall) replaced them. The village was bypassed in the 1950s by a new alignment of Route 103.

The historic district extends along Meeting House Road, which is the former alignment of Route 103, from its southern junction with 103 to the dead-end spur on the west side of Divoll Brook. It includes a few buildings on Rockingham Hill Road, which extends south toward the village of Saxtons River. The district includes 13 properties of historic significance, including the town's first cemetery, the 1787 meeting house (a National Historic Landmark), and one of Vermont's best concentrations of late Georgian residential architecture. The oldest surviving houses date to the 1770s, and most of the building stock was built before 1850. The notable exceptions are the Grange hall and two houses, built near the road junction in the wake of the 1908 fire.

== See also ==
- National Register of Historic Places listings in Windham County, Vermont
