= Hall of Fame for Great Americans =

Sculpture gallery in the Bronx, New York

- Hall of Fame Complex
- U.S. National Register of Historic Places
- U.S. National Historic Landmark District – Contributing property
- New York City Landmark
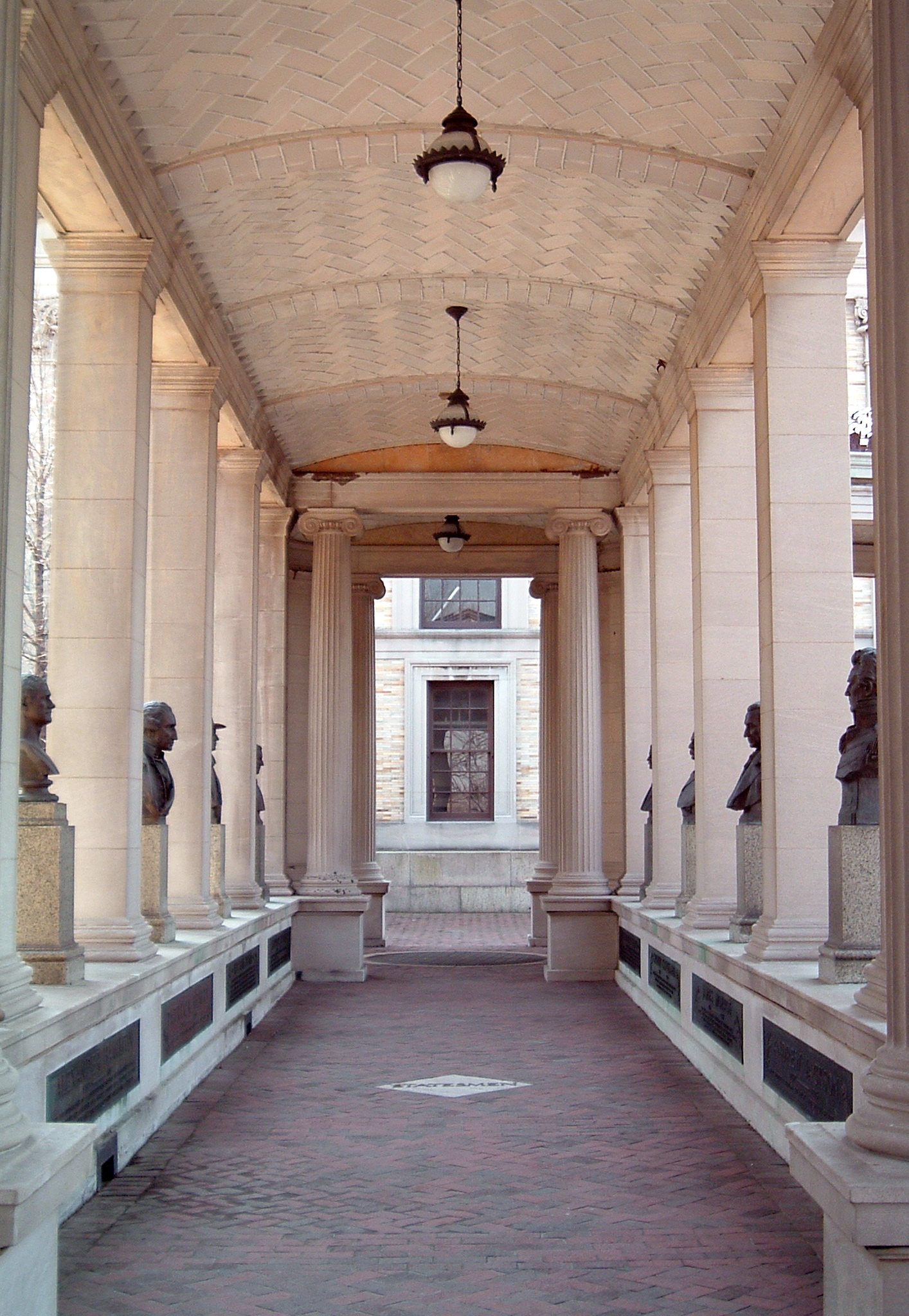
- View of the Hall of Fame for Great Americans
- Location: Bronx Community College campus, The Bronx, New York
- Coordinates: 40°51′31.7″N 73°54′50.9″W
- Area: 2 acres (0.81 ha)
- Built: 1901
- Architect: Stanford White
- Architectural style: Classical Revival, Beaux-Arts
- Part of: Bronx Community College Campus (ID12001013)
- NRHP reference No.: 79001567
- NYCL No.: 0113

Significant dates
- Added to NRHP: September 7, 1979
- Designated NYCL: February 15, 1966

The Hall of Fame for Great Americans is an outdoor sculpture gallery located on the grounds of Bronx Community College (BCC) in the Bronx, New York City. Designed by Stanford White and built in 1901 as part of the University Heights campus of New York University (NYU), it was the first hall of fame in the United States. The hall commemorates 102 prominent Americans, selected by a board of electors and grouped into one of fifteen categories. The physical structure consists of a loggia with colonnades measuring 630 feet (190 m) long. The colonnades contain niches with plaques and 96 bronze portrait busts, and the structure itself conceals a retaining wall for the Gould Memorial Library.

The philanthropist Helen Gould donated funds for the structure in 1900, and the Hall of Fame was formally dedicated on May 30, 1901. Soon after the Hall of Fame opened, it became a focal point for U.S. national pride. Originally, the hall only contained plaques honoring native-born U.S. citizens. The first bust was installed in 1907, and foreign-born citizens were inducted starting in 1915. The majority of the busts were sculpted between 1922 and 1930. Most of the busts dedicated between 1930 and 1970 were installed shortly after the elections of their respective honorees.

The Hall of Fame became part of BCC after NYU sold its Bronx campus to the City University of New York in 1973. The last honorees were elected in 1976, and the Hall of Fame has largely fallen into obscurity since then. The busts of Louis Brandeis, Clara Barton, Luther Burbank, and Andrew Carnegie were never sculpted due to a lack of funding, while the remaining 98 busts started to decay over the years. Following periods of deterioration, BCC renovated the Hall of Fame several times in the late 20th and early 21st centuries. BCC removed the busts of Confederate generals Robert E. Lee and Stonewall Jackson in 2017 following a white supremacist rally in Charlottesville, Virginia, that led to a broader national outcry against Confederate monuments.

== Design ==
The memorial structure is an open-air loggia flanked by colonnades. Designed in the neoclassical style by architect Stanford White of the firm McKim, Mead & White, it was built as part of New York University's (NYU) Bronx campus. The loggia has space for 102 bronze sculptural busts. The loggia runs to the west of the Hall of Languages, Gould Memorial Library, and Hall of Philosophy from south to north. The section around the Gould Library is curved to the west.

=== Dimensions and specifications ===
The loggia measures 630 feet (190 m) long. The original section measured 500 feet (150 m) long, and the firm of Crow, Lewis and Wick designed a 130-foot-long (40 m) annex, with McKim, Mead & White as supervising architects. Sedgwick Avenue, which runs directly west of the Hall of Fame, is about 40 to 60 feet (12 to 18 m) beneath the hall. The Hall of Fame's walkway measures 10 feet 3 inches (3.12 m) wide, flanked by parapets measuring 4 feet (1.2 m) high.

The northern and southern entrances to the Hall of Fame both contain sculpted gates designed by Samuel Yellin. The gates were donated by Mrs. Charles Beatty Alexander in memory of her late husband. The words "Enter with Joy that those within have lived" are inscribed above the northern gates, while the words "Take counsel here of Beauty, Wisdom, Power" are inscribed above the southern gates. The parapets are made of Massachusetts granite, while the pedestals and columns are made of Indiana limestone. The eight pedestals contain the inscriptions "The Hall of Fame / for Great Americans / by wealth of thought / or else by mighty deed / they served mankind / in noble character / in world-wide good / they live forevermore". The ceiling of the loggia is made of Guastavino tile, while the sloped roof above is clad with red Spanish tile.

=== Busts and plaques ===
The Hall of Fame was originally planned to have space for 150 plaques, each measuring 2 by 8 feet (0.61 by 2.44 m). As designed, the plaques measure about 13 inches (330 mm) tall and 7 feet (2.1 m) wide. Louis Comfort Tiffany designed each plaque, which includes information about each honoree's name and lifespan, as well as a quote from each honoree. The western walls of the Hall of Language and the Hall of Philosophy, which face the Hall of Fame, are also used for inscriptions.

As of 2017, the hall contains 96 busts, which are placed on pedestals above the parapet walls. Beneath each bust is a bronze tablet bearing the name of the person commemorated, significant dates, achievements, and quotations. The busts themselves were created by a variety of sculptors at various times. Each class of honorees is placed in a different portion of the hall; for example, authors' and editors' busts are placed at the north end, while inventors' busts are placed at the south end.

Next to the Hall of Fame is a bust of Gilbert du Motier, Marquis de Lafayette, a French aristocrat and military officer who fought in the American Revolutionary War. Lafayette is the only non-American citizen in the complex, though he was given honorary U.S. citizenship. Above his bust is the inscription "New York University to Lafayette 1932", while below is the inscription "I am an American citizen and an American officer."

=== Museum of the Hall of Fame ===
There are storage rooms behind the foundation halls and below the walkway. This space was originally used as the Museum of the Hall of Fame, which contained exhibits and portraits of the hall's honorees. When the Hall of Fame opened, NYU used some of the museum space as classrooms. The museum consisted of six rooms and a corridor; one of the rooms was named the Washington Gallery, after honoree George Washington.

== History ==
=== Origin and inspiration ===
Dr. Henry Mitchell MacCracken, chancellor of NYU, proposed the Hall of Fame in the late 1890s to conceal a retaining wall for the Gould Memorial Library, which was exposed because the site sloped steeply downward to the west. According to MacCracken, the hall "owes its inception in large part to hard facts of physical geography". MacCracken took inspiration from the Ruhmeshalle (Hall of Fame) in Munich, Germany, completed in 1853. The Hall of Fame for Great Americans was the first hall of fame in the United States. The word "fame" in the hall's name meant "renown", rather than the modern-day meaning of "celebrity". Chancellor McCracken described the evolution of the Hall of Fame's design:

While aesthetics compelled the architect to invent the terrace with its parapet of colonnade, the university's necessity compelled the discovery of an educational use for the architect's structure. Like most persons who have visited Germany, the chairman was acquainted with the "Ruhmes Halle," built near Munich by the King of Bavaria. Like all Americans, he admired the use made of Westminster Abbey, and of the Pantheon in Paris. But the American claims liberty to adopt new and broad rules to govern him, even when following on the track of his Old-World ancestors. Hence it was agreed that admission to this Hall of Fame should be controlled by a national body of electors, who might, as nearly as possible, represent the wisdom of the American people.

Plans for the Hall of Fame finally proceeded after Helen Gould donated $100,000 in March 1900. (Note: According to Rubin 1997, p. 14, her total gift to the university was $2 million.) John J. Tucker received the general contract for the Hall of Fame. The hall was to contain commemorative plaques for 150 individuals, 50 of whom were to be selected in 1900. Every five years thereafter, the electors would select five additional names by majority vote, with the final selections being made in 2000. An individual was eligible only if they were born in the U.S. and had died at least ten years prior. NYU invited 100 people to serve as electors in late March 1900. At that point, the cost of the hall had nearly doubled to $200,000. Each U.S. state originally had one elector; in twenty states, the chief justice served as that state's elector.

The electors received 252 nominations, only 30 of which received the required majority of fifty votes. In October 1900, the NYU Senate approved the first inductees for inclusion. The Senate also approved the addition of a loggia for foreign-born inductees, with space for up to thirty names. The hall included 29 names when it was dedicated on May 30, 1901; the foreign inductees' loggia had not yet been built due to a lack of funds. When the Hall of Fame was completed, it was so widely known that The New York Times regularly reported on nominations and elections, even detailing how many votes each nominee received.

=== Elections and heyday ===
==== 1900s and 1910s ====
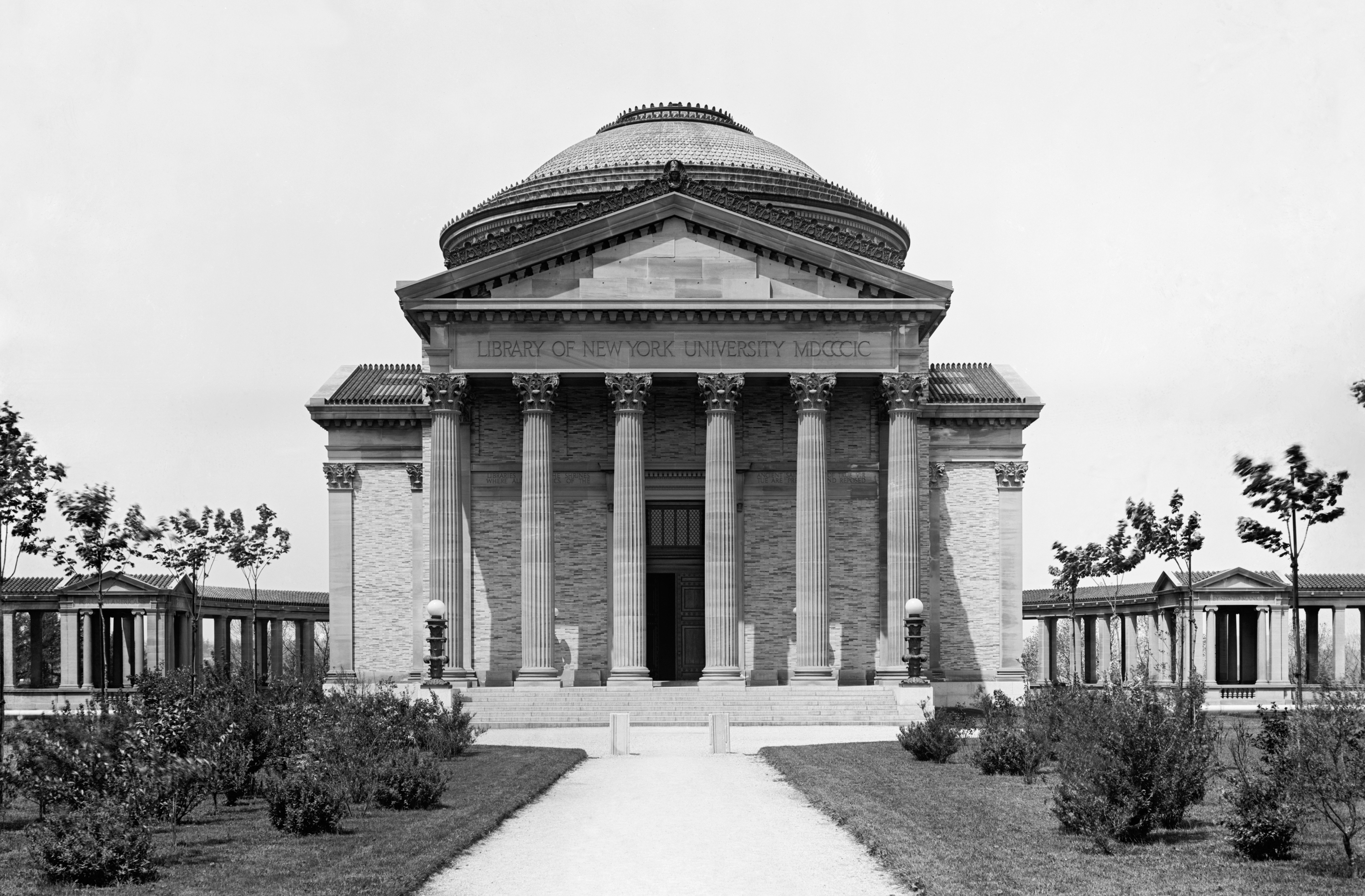
The Gould Memorial Library in 1904, with the Hall of Fame visible on either side

The NYU Senate contemplated hosting a special election in 1902 to fill the 21 vacancies, but it reneged on this plan. Instead, the electors had to select 26 native-born men during the 1905 election, as well as 12 women and six foreign-born men. A women's hall of fame was announced in February 1904. Separate elections were hosted for women and for foreign-born men. Every person who received at least ten votes in the 1900 election was re-nominated. Male nominees needed at least 51 votes; female nominees only required 47 votes because eight electors refused to vote for any woman. Five native-born men, three women, and three foreign-born men were selected that year; their plaques were dedicated in 1907. The Hall of Fame's first bust (depicting Horace Mann, who had been elected in 1900) was also dedicated in 1907. The foreign-born honorees were not inducted at the time because MacCracken was planning a separate wing for them. Some electors protested that the foreign-born and native-born honorees should be honored together.

Eleven additional names were selected in 1910. In the five years that followed, 20 electors either retired or died, and 25 electors were appointed in their place. MacCracken changed the rules for electors ahead of the 1915 election, such that one elector was apportioned to every state or group of states with one million residents. As a result of the United States' population growth, each state again had its own elector in later years. MacCracken canceled plans for a separate wing for foreign-born honorees in 1914, allowing foreign-born citizens to be inducted into the existing Hall of Fame. Four foreign-born men had been elected in 1905 and 1910, but they had never been inducted. In addition, the electors were allowed to select at least two women in every election. The planned northern extension of the Hall of Fame was never built.

In early 1915, NYU announced plans for a separate women's wing after receiving $33,000 in donations. That year, the electors selected seven new names (including Charlotte Cushman, the first performer to be elected) as well as two of the foreign-born honorees from the previous elections. An additional 21 electors either retired or died in the next five years, and only 34 of the original electors remained by 1920. The Hall of Fame was temporarily converted to a barracks in 1918, during World War I. The United States Army laid out beds for 600 soldiers in the museum underneath the colonnade. The next year, writer Robert Underwood Johnson was appointed as the Hall of Fame's second director, following the death of MacCracken, his immediate predecessor.

==== 1920s and 1930s ====
Between the two world wars, the Hall of Fame saw up to 50,000 visitors annually. Seven Americans were selected in 1920, including foreign-born theologian Roger Williams, who had first been elected ten years prior. Five busts, depicting nominees from previous elections, were unveiled in May 1922; they were the first busts to be added since 1907. The same year, the Hall of Fame's board of electors decided to abolish separate elections for female nominees. The board also enacted stricter inclusion criteria: nominees were only considered if they had been dead for at least 25 years, and three-fifths of electors had to agree on induction. The electors had been concerned that "zealous partisans and relatives" would attempt to nominate individuals of "temporary vogue" shortly after their deaths. The honorees' tablets, which had been segregated by gender, were subsequently rearranged. New tablets had to be created for each of the seven female honorees because the existing tablets were wedged so firmly into the hall's foundation.

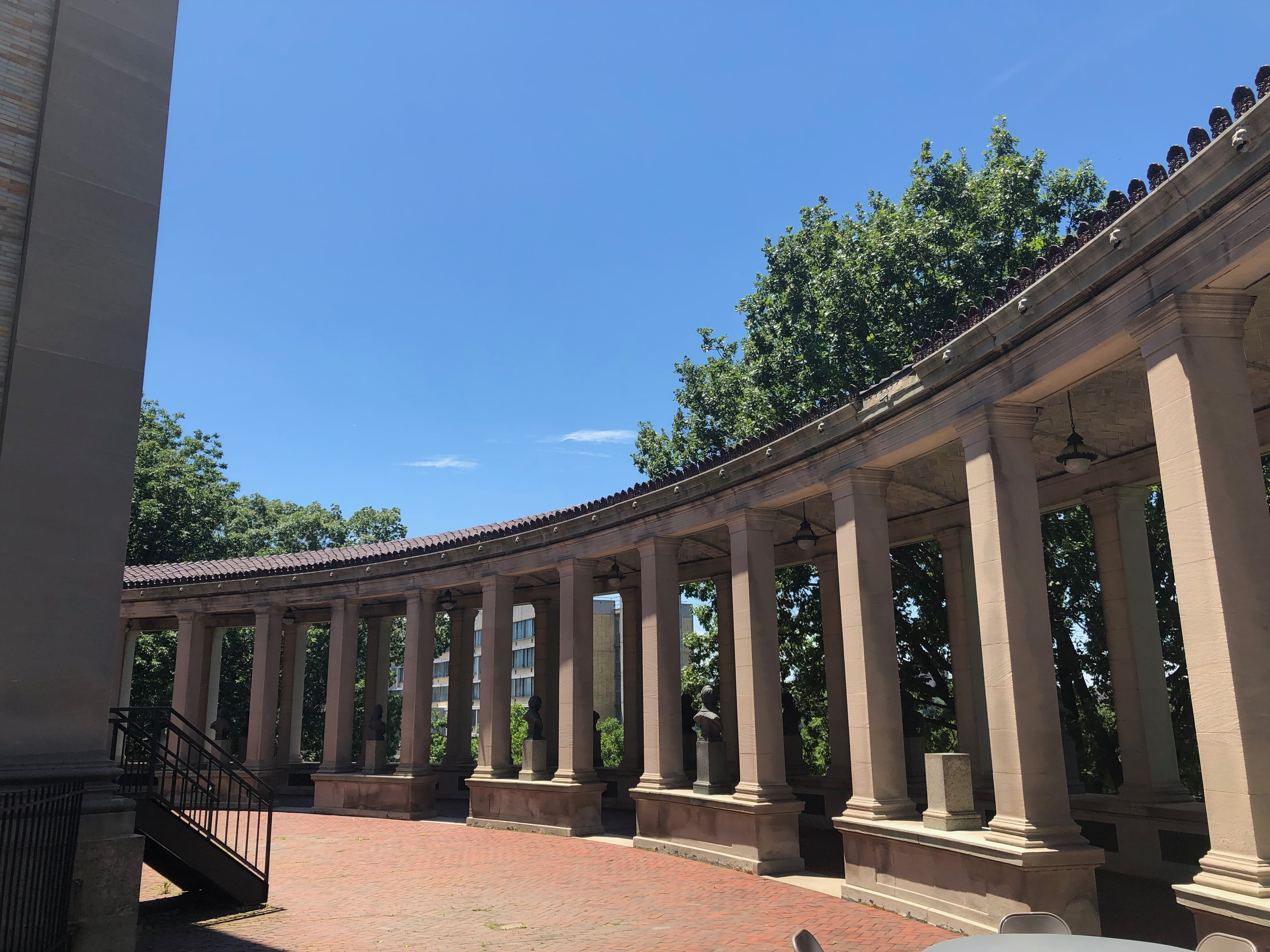
Central section of the Hall of Fame for Great Americans, curving around Gould Memorial Library

NYU continued to unveil busts of honorees from previous elections in May of each year. Seven additional busts were dedicated in 1923, ten in 1924, and five in 1925. Only two men were picked in the 1925 election, the first held under the new rules; one of them was foreign-born naval officer John Paul Jones, who had first been elected twenty years prior. The university dedicated nine busts in 1926, six in 1927, five in 1928, and eight in 1929. Nine busts were dedicated in May 1930, as well as two sets of new gates. At that point, all 65 previous honorees had busts. Four men were elected to the Hall of Fame later the same year, and their busts were unveiled the next May.

By 1935, the Hall of Fame retained 11 of its original electors. That year, the electors voted to induct three men. The busts of two of these men were unveiled in May 1936, but the bust of Grover Cleveland was dedicated almost a year later in March 1937, coinciding with what would have been his 100th birthday. The Hall of Fame's electors leased offices at the International Building in Rockefeller Center in mid-1937. Following Johnson's death later that year, journalist John Huston Finley was appointed as the Hall of Fame's director.

==== 1940s to 1960s ====
Of 141 candidates nominated in 1940, composer Stephen Collins Foster was the only person selected; his bust was dedicated the next May. This was the first time a musician was elected to the Hall of Fame, as well as the first election in which a single honoree was selected. Radio host William Lyon Phelps was also appointed as the hall's director in early 1941. Phelps died less than three years later, and educator James Rowland Angell became the hall's fifth director in 1944. The Hall of Fame's electors switched back to a majority vote for the 1945 election, when four men were selected: Booker T. Washington, Sidney Lanier, Walter Reed, and Thomas Paine. The bust of Washington, the hall's first Black honoree, was dedicated in May 1946. Busts of the other honorees were delayed; Lanier's bust was dedicated in October 1946, while Reed's was dedicated in May 1948. Ralph Washington Sockman, the pastor of Christ Church United Methodist in Manhattan, became the hall's sixth director after Angell died in 1949. Sockman served in that position until his death two decades later.

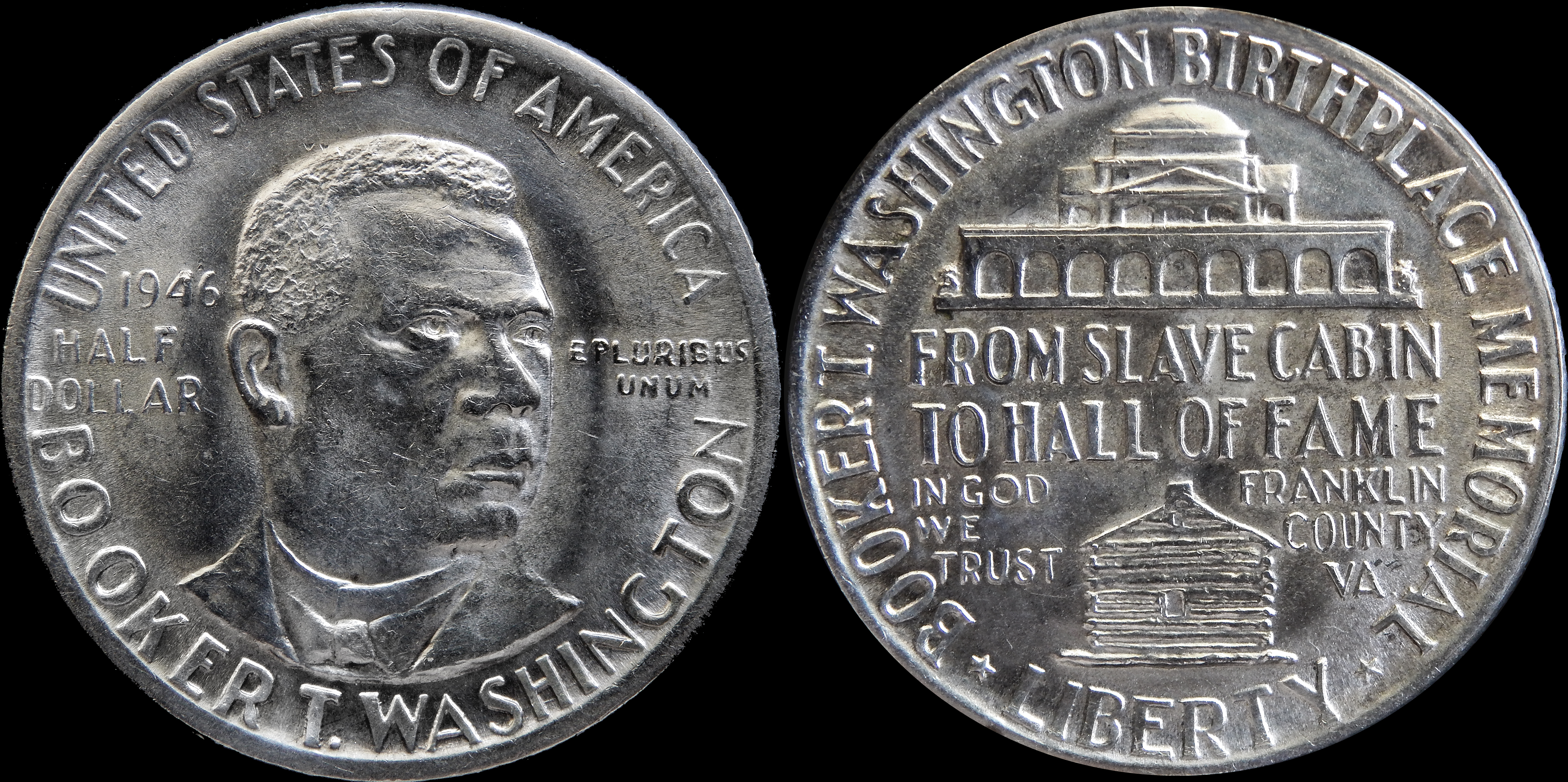
The obverse of the Booker T. Washington Memorial half dollar depicts the Hall of Fame with the caption "From Slave Cabin to Hall of Fame"

Six people were selected in 1950: Susan B. Anthony, Alexander Graham Bell, Josiah Willard Gibbs, William C. Gorgas, Theodore Roosevelt, and Woodrow Wilson. Bell's and Gorgas's busts were dedicated in 1951, followed by those of Anthony and Payne in 1952 and Theodore Roosevelt in 1954. Wilbur Wright, George Westinghouse, and Stonewall Jackson were selected during the 1955 election. By then, the renown of some of the nominees had begun to decline, and many nominees tended to be from lesser-known fields. The bust of Wilson, who had been honored in the previous election, was dedicated in May 1956. Stonewall Jackson's bust was dedicated one year later in May 1957, followed that December by the busts of Westinghouse and Gibbs. NYU wished to unveil Wilbur Wright's bust alongside that of his brother Orville Wright, who had died in 1948 and was thus ineligible for nomination until the 1970s. NYU's senate waived the 25-year requirement for Orville Wright, allowing him to be nominated during the 1960 election.

Thomas Edison, Henry David Thoreau, and Edward MacDowell were elected to the Hall of Fame in 1960. Ten people, including Orville Wright, failed to get a sufficient number of votes and were automatically re-nominated for the next election. Edison's bust was unveiled in June 1961, while Thoreau's was unveiled the following May, the hundredth anniversary of his death. MacDowell's bust was not unveiled until October 1964. In addition, the Hall of Fame hired the Medallic Arts Company in 1963 to create bronze and silver medals for each of the honorees. The company created 99 different designs of medals. Orville Wright was finally selected for the Hall of Fame in 1965, along with Jane Addams, Oliver Wendell Holmes Jr., and Sylvanus Thayer. Four of the five remaining busts were dedicated in each of the three subsequent years. The first was Thayer's bust in 1966, followed by the Wright brothers' busts and then Addams's bust. The Hall of Fame did not dedicate Holmes's bust until 1970, five years after his election.

=== Sale of campus and final elections ===
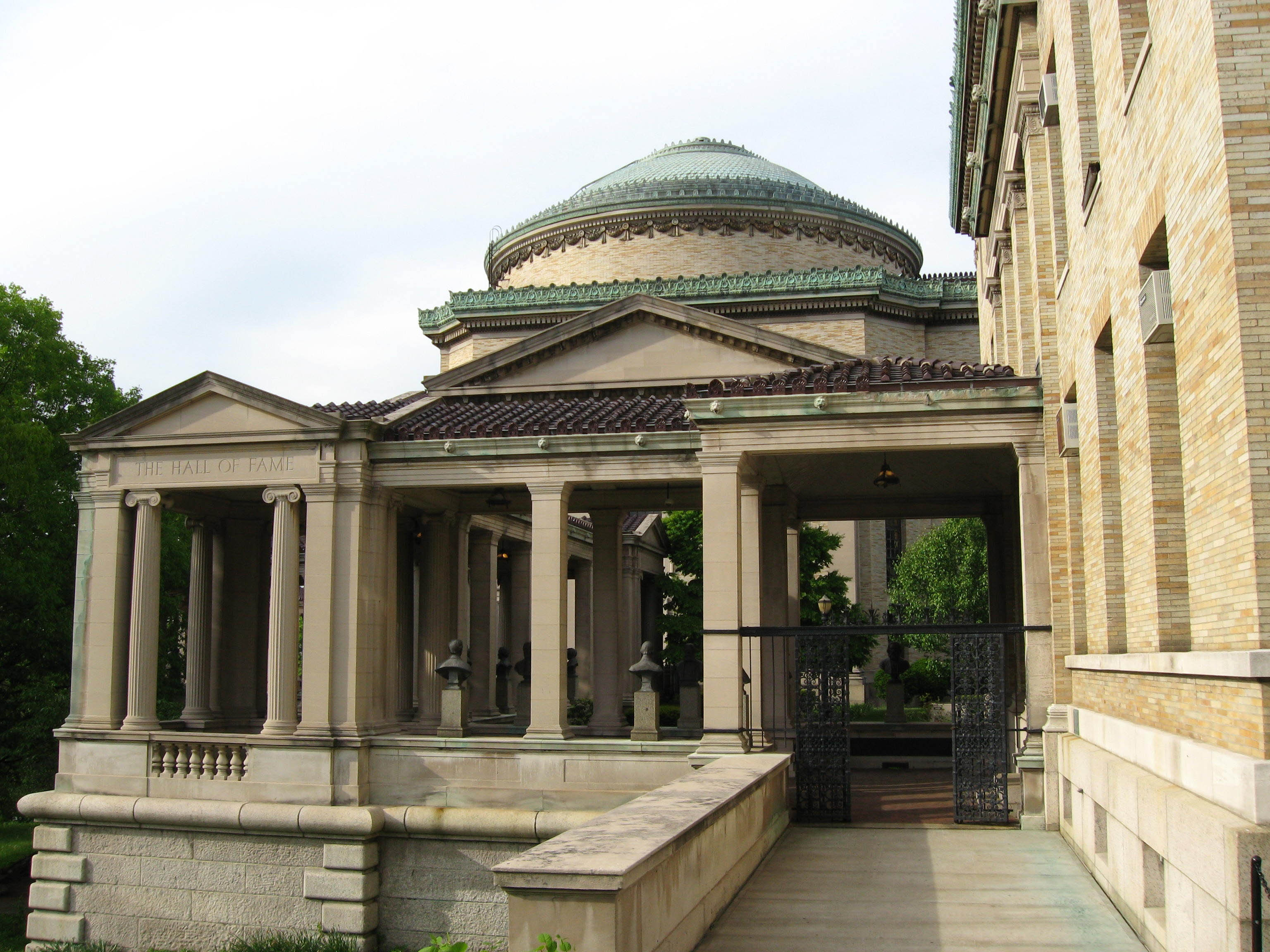
South entrance

The Hall of Fame remained prominent through the 1960s, when the hall and its honorees were covered in the World Book Encyclopedia. Only two individuals were elected to the Hall of Fame in 1970: Albert A. Michelson and Lillian Wald. Subsequently, elections for the Hall of Fame were hosted every three years. Wald's bust was installed in September 1971. By then, the hall's renown had started to decline. Urban planner Robert Moses wrote in 1971 that the previous election had happened largely without fanfare and that the American Revolution Bicentennial Commission did not even mention the Hall of Fame in its reports. According to Charles Parks, leader of the National Sculpture Society, the Hall of Fame's decline could be attributed to the fact that modern halls of fame commemorated living people, honoring "lots of celebrities and very few heroes".

In 1973, NYU sold its Bronx campus to the City University of New York (CUNY), which operated the campus as part of the Bronx Community College (BCC). The sale specifically excluded the Hall of Fame, which CUNY officials believed had no value. Following the sale, there was uncertainty as to whether NYU, CUNY, or another organization would operate the Hall of Fame. The Trustees of the Hall of Fame was established in 1974, and NYU and CUNY jointly provided $125,000 a year for the hall's upkeep. The agreement lasted three years. Four additional honorees (Louis D. Brandeis, George Washington Carver, Franklin D. Roosevelt, and John Philip Sousa) were elected in November 1973, bringing the total number of inductees to 99.

NYU was considering eliminating its $61,000 annual subsidy for the Hall of Fame by 1976. The hall's remote location, far from the New York City Subway, attracted few visitors compared to other tourist attractions in New York City. At the time, it still had 10,000 annual visitors. That year, the Hall of Fame started electing honorees based on how many points they received from electors, rather than based on a majority vote. Clara Barton, Luther Burbank, and Andrew Carnegie were elected to the Hall of Fame the same year. This was the Hall of Fame's last election. Carver's bust was installed in 1977, four years after he had been elected, while Roosevelt's bust was not installed for another fifteen years. The busts of Brandeis, Barton, Burbank, and Carnegie were never executed due to a lack of funds.

=== Maintenance and upkeep ===
==== 1970s to 1990s ====
Funding for the Hall of Fame ceased nearly entirely after the United States Bicentennial in 1976, and the agreement between NYU and CUNY expired around the same time. All of the hall's guides were fired and the hall's information booth was closed. Sightseeing buses stopped visiting the Hall of Fame the next year as its popularity declined. This was at least partially attributed to fears of high crime in the surrounding area. The Los Angeles Times said in 1978 that "its dignity and grandeur are viewed by almost no one today". That year, officials in New Jersey rejected a plan to relocate the Hall of Fame to Liberty State Park. Responsibility for the Hall of Fame was split between NYU, which owned the busts; the Dormitory Authority of the State of New York (DASNY), which owned the colonnade; and CUNY, which provided security and maintenance. In 1979, there was one staff member and no funds for maintenance. Many of the busts corroded in the following years. Some busts were also vandalized, such as that of Andrew Jackson, which was knocked out of its niche and pushed down a hill. The remaining silver medals of honorees were melted down. Johnson & Jensen bought the remaining bronze medals, which they planned to sell at a deep discount.

DASNY had allocated $2 million to fix the leaking roof and the walkway in 1981, though the National Endowment for the Arts rejected BCC's request for a $37,000 grant to repair the Hall of Fame. The hall was closed for repairs that year, reopening in 1985. Afterward, BCC created a promotional videotape and trained several tour guides. The state government also provided $165,000 to fund educational programs and new directors at the Hall of Fame. The surrounding neighborhood had started to improve by the late 1980s, though the Hall of Fame remained relatively obscure. The hall had only 1,000 visitors in 1987, excluding students on field trips, even though admission was free. In 1991, CUNY hired Ralph M. Rourke as the Hall of Fame's first director in more than a decade. Five busts remained to be installed because of a lack of funds, but Rourke hoped to install Barton's and Franklin D. Roosevelt's busts within a year. Roosevelt's bust was finally installed in July 1992.

The William A. Hall Partnership was hired to restore the ceiling in 1992, and the Cavalier Renaissance Foundry restored 90 of the busts for about $40,000. Several conservators criticized the fact that the original finishes of these busts had been removed. The state provided $200,000 for the renovation; at the time, public contributions toward the hall's upkeep had ceased nearly entirely. The hall ultimately cost $1.3 million to restore; the project was completed in 1997. The next year, the Municipal Art Society gave BCC a preservation award for "outstanding building restoration". By the late 1990s, Rourke hoped to restart elections for the Hall of Fame. To accommodate additional honorees, Rourke proposed expanding the Hall of Fame into the Gould Library, as well as displaying short video clips instead of busts. Meanwhile, Rourke asked Brandeis University, the American Red Cross, and the Carnegie Foundation if they would respectively fund the busts of Brandeis, Barton, and Carnegie. All three organizations declined to donate $25,000 for each bust.

==== 2000s to present ====
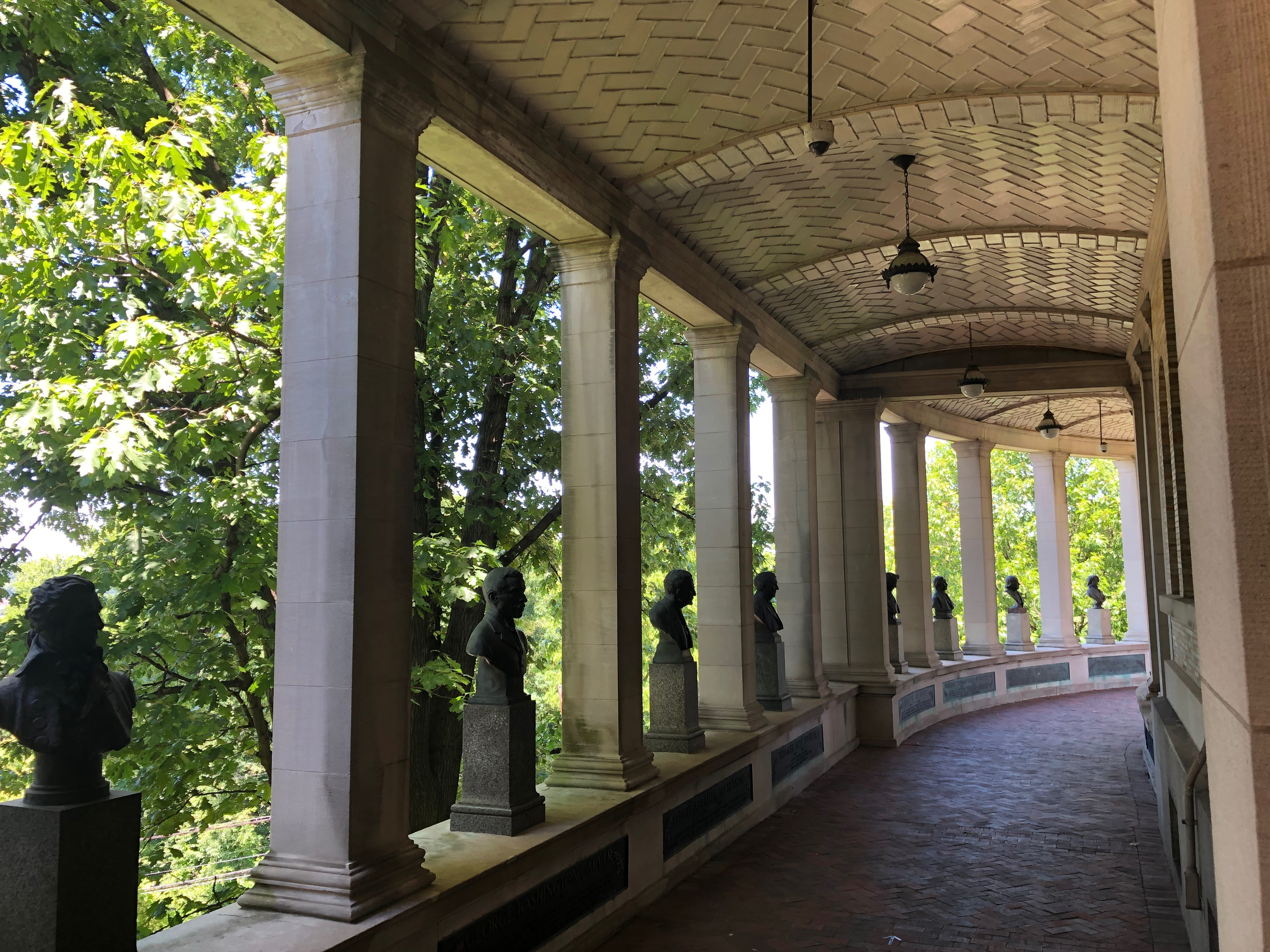
Interior of the hall as seen in 2019

In 2000, Bronx borough president Fernando Ferrer offered a matching grant of $500,000 to fund further renovations, as well as the four unexecuted busts. To raise money for the hall's renovation and expansion, BCC organized a $1 million fundraiser in 2001. Nearly two years later, BCC had raised only $2,000, all of it from NYU alumni. By 2009, the Hall of Fame was largely being maintained by two local historians, Art and Susan Zuckerman, who said the hall had 5,000 visitors per year. Many of the honorees had fallen into obscurity, leading Susan Zuckerman to say: "If you know 70 percent of the names, you’re doing well."

BCC announced plans in 2015 to raise $25 to $50 million for a renovation of the Gould Library, including an expansion of the Hall of Fame into the library. In August 2017, following a white supremacist rally in Charlottesville, Virginia, New York governor Andrew Cuomo ordered that the busts of Confederate States Army generals Robert E. Lee and Stonewall Jackson be removed. Following the removals, the Hall of Fame had 96 busts and space for six additional busts. CUNY planned to host an election to fill the two remaining spots, but there were still no funds for these elections. The Hall of Fame was deteriorating by 2018, with cracked masonry in many places and bird droppings on some of the busts. The Cultural Landscape Foundation described the Hall of Fame as being one of several historic sites across the United States that were "at risk".

== Nominations ==
All nominees had to be citizens of the United States, whether naturalized or native-born, and they were required to have died at least 25 years prior to nomination. Originally, inductees were required to have died at least 10 years before their nomination, but this was increased in 1922. (Note: Constance Woolson, nominated in 1900, had been dead for only six years at the time. Orville Wright was elected in 1965, even though he had died only 17 years prior.) In addition, only people who had made a "major contribution to the economic, political, or cultural life of the nation" were considered for nomination.

=== Voting process ===
Originally, the public could make nominations during March and April of each election year; no nominations were accepted after May 1. By the 1950s, the nomination period lasted for an entire year. If a nominee received a substantial number of votes in a previous election, they were automatically re-nominated for the next election. For example, all nominees who had received more than five votes in 1910 or 1915 were also considered in 1920. The threshold for re-nomination was increased to 20 votes starting in 1935.

The board of electors then decided on each nomination from June to October. All electors were required to send in their ballots by October 1; to accommodate electors who lived further away, the Hall of Fame accepted ballots until October 15. Each elector obtained ballots from the Hall of Fame's curator, upon which they could vote for up to seven individuals. The electors could only vote on nominations from the public or nominees from previous years. An elector could then mark a nominee as being either eligible, ineligible, or out of that elector's field of expertise. Electors included "the most respected writers, historians, and educators of their day, along with scores of congressmen, a dozen Supreme Court justices, and six Presidents". The Hall of Fame had at least one elector from every U.S. state. To avoid a conflict of interest, NYU officials were barred from serving on the board of electors. Each elector was picked by NYU's faculty senate; if an elector were to die or resign, the NYU senate would vote to select new electors.

The board of electors originally selected candidates by a simple majority vote, although three-fifths of electors had to agree on nominations from 1925 to 1940. After the board of electors voted in favor of a nominee, a majority of NYU's senate (including its "honorary members") had to approve the board of electors' choice. The NYU senate could theoretically veto any selection, although this never happened during the hall's history. For the 1976 election, the majority vote was replaced with a point system. During that election, candidates were nominated to one of three categories (arts/humanities, sciences, and government/business/labor), and the highest-ranking candidate in each category was elected. Although no elections have taken place since then, the rules were changed in 1979 so that art, business and labor, government, humanities, and science were all split into their own categories.

The following table summarizes each election:

Year	Total electors	Votes required	Pct. required	No. elected	Notes
Percentage-based vote system
1900	100	51	50%	29	Only 97 electors cast ballots.
1905	95	48	50%	8	3 foreign-born men were also selected but were ineligible.
1910	97	49	50%	10	1 foreign-born man was also selected but was ineligible.
1915	99	50	50%	9	
1920	101	51	60%	7	
1925	105	63	60%	2	
1930	107	64	60%	4	
1935	101	61	60%	3	
1940	108	65	60%	1	
1945	93	47	50%	4	
1950	120	61	50%	6	
1955	121	61	50%	3	
1960	141	71	50%	3	
1965	124	63	50%	4	
1970	109	55	50%	2	
1973	134	68	50%	4	
Point system
1976	158	—N/a		3	The winners in each category had the following scores: Arts and Humanities: 942 points; Sciences: 740 points; Government, Business and Labor: 1,103 points

=== Classification of honorees ===
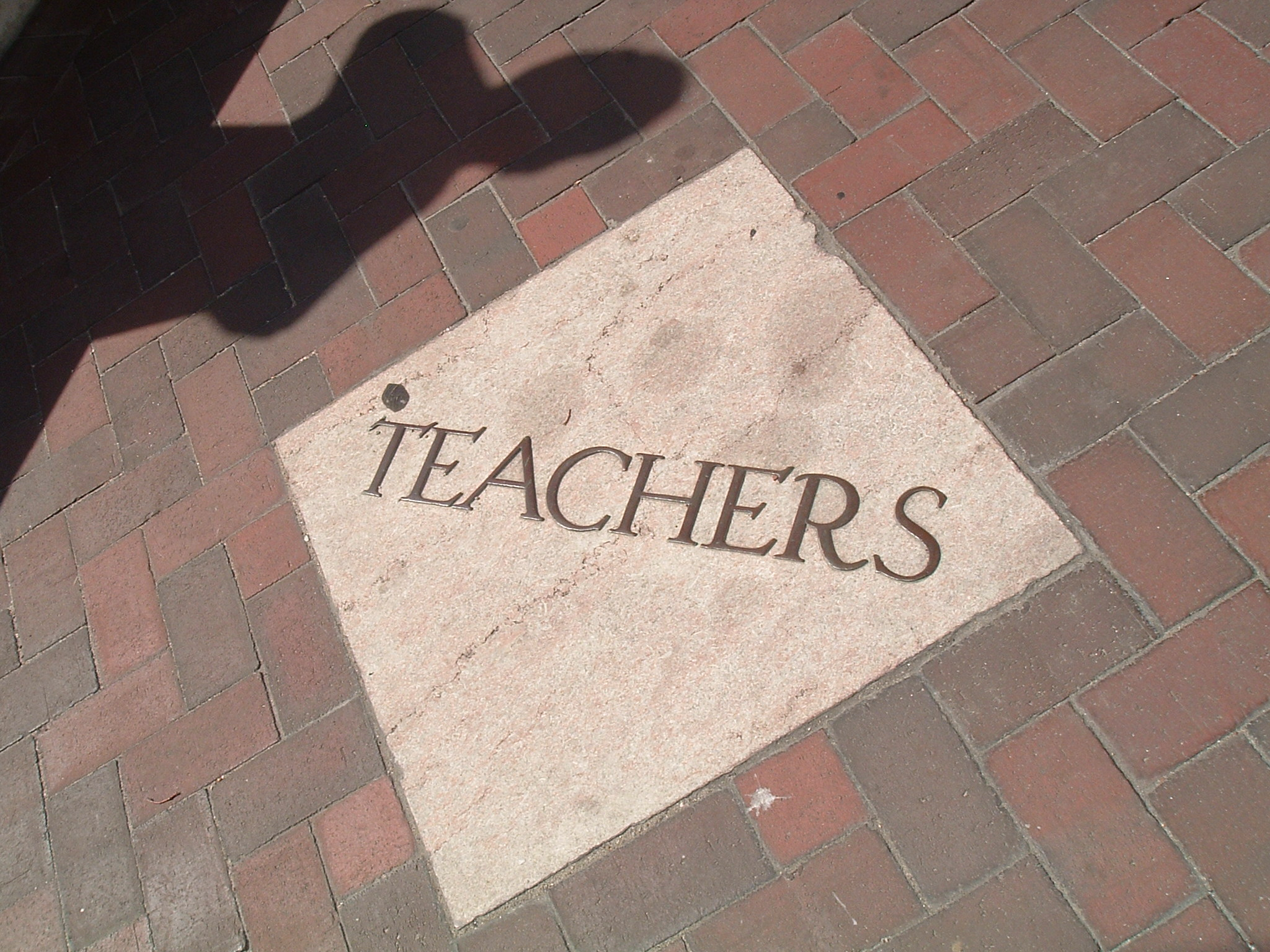
A floor tile at the Hall of Fame denoting the section set aside for busts of teachers

The first 50 names were supposed to represent "a majority" of people from 15 classes:

- authors and editors
- business men
- inventors
- missionaries and explorers
- philanthropists and reformers
- clergymen and theologians
- scientists
- engineers and architects
- lawyers and judges
- musicians, painters, and sculptors
- physicians and surgeons
- politicians and statesmen
- soldiers and sailors
- teachers
- distinguished men and women outside of these classes

These classifications have not been followed because the hall's electors only selected 29 people in the first election. Furthermore, the requirement could not be enforced after the 1900 election. In practice, most of the honorees in 1900 were politicians and statesmen. More than three decades later, politicians and statesmen comprised a plurality of the hall's honorees.

=== Honorees ===
As of 1976, when the last election was held, the Hall of Fame had 102 honorees. At least one-quarter of honorees are from New York state or have ties to the state. Seven members of the Hall of Fame's board of electors were themselves elected.

Honorees of the Hall of Fame for Great Americans
Honoree	Classification	Lifetime	Year inducted	Votes received	Pct. vote	Sculptor	Notes	Ref.
John Adams	politicians and statesmen	1735–1826	1900	61	61%	John Francis Paramino		
John Quincy Adams	politicians and statesmen	1767–1848	1905	58	61%	Edmond Thomas Quinn		
Jane Addams	authors and editors	1860–1935	1965	94	76%	Granville Carter		
Louis Agassiz	scientists	1807–1873	1915	59	61%	Anna Hyatt Huntington	Initially elected in 1905 with 83 votes (87%); Born outside the United States, so ineligible for induction until 1914	
Susan B. Anthony	philanthropists and reformers	1820–1906	1950	72	60%	Brenda Putnam		
John James Audubon	musicians, painters and sculptors	1785–1851	1900	57	57%	A. Stirling Calder		
George Bancroft	authors and editors	1800–1891	1910	53	55%	Rudulph Evans		
Clara Barton	nurse, founder of the American Red Cross	1821–1912	1976	Point system used		Bust unexecuted	Scored highest in arts/humanities category (942 points)	
Henry Ward Beecher	clergymen and theologians	1813–1887	1900	66	66%	J. Massey Rhind		
Alexander Graham Bell	inventors	1847–1922	1950	70	58%	Stanley Martineau		
Daniel Boone	missionaries and explorers	1734–1820	1915	52	54%	Albin Polasek		
Edwin Booth	actor	1833–1893	1925	85	81%	Edmond Thomas Quinn		
Louis Brandeis	lawyers and judges	1856–1941	1973	98	73%	Bust unexecuted		
Phillips Brooks	clergymen and theologians	1835–1893	1910	64	66%	Daniel Chester French		
William Cullen Bryant	authors and editors	1794–1878	1910	59	61%	Herbert Adams		
Luther Burbank	scientists	1849–1926	1976	Point system used		Bust unexecuted	Scored highest in sciences category (740 points)	
Andrew Carnegie	philanthropists and reformers	1835–1919	1976	Point system used		Bust unexecuted	Scored highest in government/business/labor category (1,103 points)	
George Washington Carver	inventors	1860s–1943	1973	104	78%	Richmond Barthé		
William Ellery Channing	clergymen and theologians	1780–1842	1900	58	58%	Herbert Adams		
Rufus Choate	teachers	1799–1859	1915	52	54%	Hermon MacNeil		
Henry Clay	politicians and statesmen	1777–1852	1900	74	74%	Robert Ingersoll Aitken		
Samuel Langhorne Clemens (a.k.a. Mark Twain)	authors and editors	1835–1910	1920	72	71%	Albert Humphreys		
Grover Cleveland	politicians and statesmen	1837–1908	1935	77	76%	Rudulph Evans		
James Fenimore Cooper	authors and editors	1789–1851	1910	62	64%	Victor Salvatore		
Peter Cooper	inventors	1791–1883	1900	69	69%	Chester Beach		
Charlotte Cushman	actress	1816–1876	1915	53	55%	Frances Grimes		
James Buchanan Eads	engineers and architects	1820–1887	1920	51	50%	Charles Grafly		
Thomas Edison	inventors	1847–1931	1960	108	77%	Bryant Baker		
Jonathan Edwards	clergymen and theologians	1703–1758	1900	82	82%	Charles Grafly		
Ralph Waldo Emerson	authors and editors	1803–1882	1900	86	86%	Daniel Chester French		
David Farragut	soldiers and sailors	1801–1870	1900	79	79%	Charles Grafly		
Stephen Foster	musicians, painters and sculptors	1826–1864	1940	86	80%	Walker Hancock		
Benjamin Franklin	politicians and statesmen	1706–1790	1900	94	94%	Robert Ingersoll Aitken		
Robert Fulton	inventors	1765–1815	1900	84	84%	Jean-Antoine Houdon		
Josiah Willard Gibbs	scientists	1839–1903	1950	64	53%	Stanley Martineau		
William C. Gorgas	physicians and surgeons	1854–1920	1950	81	68%	Bryant Baker		
Ulysses S. Grant	soldiers and sailors rulers and statesmen	1822–1885	1900	92	92%	James Earle Fraser & Thomas Hudson Jones		
Asa Gray	scientists	1810–1888	1900	51	51%	Chester Beach		
Alexander Hamilton	politicians and statesmen	1755 or 1757–1804	1915	70	72%	Giuseppe Ceracchi	Initially elected in 1905 with 88 votes (93%); Born outside the United States, so ineligible for induction until 1914	
Nathaniel Hawthorne	authors and editors	1804–1864	1900	72	72%	Daniel Chester French		
Joseph Henry	scientists	1797–1878	1915	56	58%	John Flanagan		
Patrick Henry	politicians and statesmen	1736–1799	1920	57	56%	Charles Keck		
Oliver Wendell Holmes Sr.	lawyers and judges	1809–1894	1910	69	71%	Edmond Thomas Quinn		
Oliver Wendell Holmes Jr.	lawyers and judges	1841–1935	1965	79	64%	Joseph Kiselewski		
Mark Hopkins	teachers	1802–1887	1915	69	71%	Hans Hoerbst		
Elias Howe	inventors	1819–1867	1915	61	63%	Charles Keck	previously selected in 1900 with 53 of 100 votes	
Washington Irving	authors and editors	1783–1859	1900	82	82%	Edward McCartan		
Andrew Jackson	politicians and statesmen	1767–1845	1910	53	55%	Belle Kinney		
Thomas J. "Stonewall" Jackson	soldiers and sailors	1824–1863	1955	72	60%	Bryant Baker	removed 2017	
Thomas Jefferson	politicians and statesmen	1743–1826	1900	90	90%	Robert Ingersoll Aitken		
John Paul Jones	soldiers and sailors	1747–1792	1925	68	65%	Charles Grafly	Initially elected in 1905 with 54 votes (58%); Born outside the United States, so ineligible for induction until 1914; Rejected upon renomination in 1915 and 1920	
James Kent	lawyers and judges	1763–1847	1900	65	65%	Edmond Thomas Quinn		
Sidney Lanier	authors and editors	1842–1881	1945	48	52%	Hans Schuler		
Robert E. Lee	soldiers and sailors	1807–1870	1900	69	69%	George T. Brewster	removed 2017	
Abraham Lincoln	politicians and statesmen	1809–1865	1900	96	96%	Augustus Saint-Gaudens		
Henry Wadsworth Longfellow	authors and editors	1807–1882	1900	84	84%	Rudulph Evans		
James Russell Lowell	authors and editors	1819–1891	1905	58	61%	Allan Clark		
Mary Lyon	teachers	1797–1849	1905	58	67%	Laura Gardin Fraser	One of the first three female inductees	
Edward A. Macdowell	musicians, painters and sculptors	1860–1908	1960	72	51%	C. Paul Jennewein		
James Madison	politicians and statesmen	1751–1836	1905	56	59%	Charles Keck		
Horace Mann	teachers	1796–1859	1900	67	67%	Adolph Alexander Weinman		
John Marshall	lawyers and judges	1755–1835	1900	91	91%	Herbert Adams		
Matthew Fontaine Maury	scientists	1806–1873	1930	66	62%	Frederick William Sievers		
Albert A. Michelson	scientists	1852–1931	1970	82	75%	Elisabeth Gordon Chandler		
Maria Mitchell	scientists	1818–1889	1905	48	55%	Emma F. Brigham	One of the first three female inductees	
James Monroe	politicians and statesmen	1758–1831	1930	66	62%	Hermon MacNeil		
Samuel Morse	inventors	1791–1872	1900	79	79%	Chester Beach		
William Thomas Morton	physicians and surgeons	1819–1868	1920	72	71%	Helen Farnsworth Mears		
John Lothrop Motley	authors and editors	1814–1877	1910	51	53%	Frederick MacMonnies		
Simon Newcomb	scientists	1835–1909	1935	78	77%	Frederick MacMonnies		
Thomas Paine	authors and editors	1737–1809	1945	51	55%	Malvina Hoffman		
Alice Freeman Palmer	teachers	1855–1902	1920	53	52%	Evelyn Beatrice Longman		
Francis Parkman	authors and editors	1823–1893	1915	68	70%	Hermon MacNeil		
George Peabody	philanthropists and reformers	1795–1869	1900	72	72%	Hans Schuler		
William Penn	politicians and statesmen	1644–1718	1935	83	82%	A. Stirling Calder		
Edgar Allan Poe	authors and editors	1809–1849	1910	69	71%	Daniel Chester French		
Walter Reed	physicians and surgeons	1851–1902	1945	49	53%	Cecil Howard		
Franklin D. Roosevelt	politicians and statesmen	1882–1945	1973	86	64%	Jo Davidson		
Theodore Roosevelt	politicians and statesmen	1858–1919	1950	70	58%	Georg J. Lober		
Augustus Saint-Gaudens	musicians, painters and sculptors	1848–1907	1920	72	71%	James Earle Fraser		
William Tecumseh Sherman	soldiers and sailors	1820–1891	1905	58	61%	Augustus Saint-Gaudens		
John Philip Sousa	musicians, painters and sculptors	1854–1932	1973	78	58%	Karl H. Gruppe		
Joseph Story	lawyers and judges	1779–1845	1900	64	64%	Herbert Adams		
Harriet Beecher Stowe	authors and editors	1811–1896	1910	74	76%	Brenda Putnam		
Gilbert Stuart	musicians, painters and sculptors	1755–1828	1900	52	52%	Laura Gardin Fraser		
Sylvanus Thayer	soldiers and sailors	1785–1872	1965	77	62%	Joseph Kiselewski		
Henry David Thoreau	authors and editors	1817–1862	1960	83	59%	Malvina Hoffman		
Lillian Wald	nurse and author	1867–1940	1970	68	62%	Eleanor Platt		
Booker T. Washington	teachers	1856–1915	1945	57	61%	Richmond Barthé		
George Washington	politicians and statesmen	1732–1799	1900	97	97%	Jean-Antoine Houdon	Unanimously inducted	
Daniel Webster	politicians and statesmen	1782–1852	1900	96	96%	Robert Ingersoll Aitken		
George Westinghouse	inventors	1846–1914	1955	62	51%	Edmondo Quattrocchio		
James Abbott McNeill Whistler	musicians, painters and sculptors	1834–1903	1930	74	69%	Frederick MacMonnies		
Walt Whitman	authors and editors	1819–1892	1930	64	60%	Chester Beach		
Eli Whitney	inventors	1765–1825	1900	66	66%	Chester Beach		
John Greenleaf Whittier	authors and editors	1807–1892	1905	53	56%	Rudulph Evans		
Roger Williams	clergymen and theologians	1603–1683	1920	66	65%	Hermon MacNeil	Initially elected in 1910 with 64 votes (66%); Born outside the United States, so ineligible for induction until 1914; Rejected upon renomination in 1915	
Emma Willard	teachers	1787–1870	1905	50	57%	Frances Grimes	One of the first three female inductees	
Frances Willard	teachers	1839–1898	1910	56	58%	Lorado Taft		
Woodrow Wilson	politicians and statesmen	1856–1924	1950	77	64%	Walker Kirtland Hancock		
Orville Wright	inventors	1871–1948	1965	74	60%	Paul Fjelde		
Wilbur Wright	inventors	1867–1912	1955	82	68%	Vincent Glinsky		

=== Nominees not elected ===
The following people were among those nominated at least once but not elected:

- Samuel Adams
- Louisa May Alcott
- Johnny Appleseed
- Chester A. Arthur
- Sarah Franklin Bache
- Henry Barnard
- William Beaumont
- John Shaw Billings
- George Caleb Bingham
- Elizabeth Blackwell
- Elena Petrovna Blavatsky
- Borden Parker Bowne
- William Brewster
- William Austin Burt
- Horace Bushnell
- John C. Calhoun
- Alice Cary
- Frederick Edwin Church
- George Rogers Clark
- George M. Cohan
- Calvin Coolidge
- John Singleton Copley
- Jefferson Davis
- Dorothea Dix
- Paul Dunbar
- Amelia Earhart
- Wyatt Earp
- John Eliot
- Henry Ford
- James A. Garfield
- William Lloyd Garrison
- Lou Gehrig
- Henry George
- Horace Greeley
- Sarah Josepha Buell Hale
- Warren G. Harding
- Benjamin Harrison
- William Henry Harrison
- Charles Evans Hughes
- Richard M. Hoe
- John Ireland
- Helen Hunt Jackson
- William James
- John Jay
- Andrew Johnson
- Al Jolson
- Chief Joseph
- Adoniram Judson
- Francis Scott Key
- Joyce Kilmer
- Fiorello La Guardia
- Karl Landsteiner
- Gilbert N. Lewis
- Crawford Long
- Huey Long
- Cyrus McCormick
- Robert McCormick
- Ephraim McDowell
- Charles Follen McKim
- William McKinley
- Ottmar Mergenthaler
- S. Weir Mitchell
- Lucretia Mott
- Benjamin Peirce
- Wendell Phillips
- Hiram Powers
- Will Rogers
- Babe Ruth
- Sacagawea
- Jacob Schiff
- Elizabeth Seton
- Lydia Huntley Sigourney
- Matthew Simpson
- Elizabeth Cady Stanton
- John Stevens
- Robert L. Stevens
- Nikola Tesla
- Roger B. Taney
- Benjamin Thompson
- Judah Touro
- Paul M. Warburg
- Martha Washington
- Mary Ball Washington
- Francis Wayland
- Noah Webster
- William Henry Welch
- Henry Wheaton
- Theodore Dwight Woolsey
- Constance Woolson

Some of the nominees who were rejected never received any votes, including American Revolution militia officer Paul Revere. Several nominees have been rejected multiple times, including Roman Catholic saint Elizabeth Seton, poet Joyce Kilmer, and politician Horace Greeley. Many unsuccessful nominees received at least thirty votes in one election, and some surpassed this threshold in several elections. Some of the eventual honorees were rejected several times before they were selected, including Edgar Allan Poe, Walt Whitman, and James Monroe.

== Impact ==
Soon after the Hall of Fame opened, it became a focal point for U.S. national pride. As one writer, Richard Rubin, said:

It was a truly democratic institution — anyone could nominate a candidate, admission would be free, and although NYU served as a steward, raising funds and running the elections, the whole thing was technically the property of the American people.

The Wall Street Journal wrote that the Hall of Fame was "a window on early 20th-century ideas of greatness". The hall's acting director had described the Hall of Fame in 1920 as the "American Westminster Abbey", and urban planner Robert Moses said that the Hall of Fame carried "no bust of an unworthy or second-rate person". The critic Paul Goldberger described the hall's architecture in 1984 as making it "one of the most remarkable places in New York". In the years after the Hall of Fame for Great Americans opened, more than 700 halls of fame were opened across the United States. By the late 20th century, many of these halls of fame honored people in a specific field, such as a sport. As Richard Rubin of The Atlantic Monthly wrote in 1997: "Now achievement alone was enough, even achievement within a narrow context."

Starting in the late 20th century, there was some controversy over the demographic breakdown of the Hall of Fame's honorees. A major issue was that, although a majority of BCC's students were Hispanic, few of the Hall of Fame's inductees were people of color or women. Though BCC president Roscoe C. Brown Jr. expressed pride for the hall's architecture, he said in 1993: "In terms of who is in and who is not, I'm ashamed to be associated with it." He said many of the figures in the hall were "truly great people who led inspirational lives," but "quite a number make you wonder how they got in."

The Hall of Fame has also been referenced in works of popular culture, such as the 1939 film The Wizard of Oz. The Hall of Fame, along with other structures on the BCC campus, have frequently been used as a filming location.

== See also ==
- List of New York City Designated Landmarks in the Bronx
- National Register of Historic Places listings in the Bronx
- National Garden of American Heroes
- National Statuary Hall
  - National Statuary Hall Collection
