= Rockingham Meeting House =

Historic church in Vermont, United States

- Rockingham Meetinghouse
- U.S. National Register of Historic Places
- U.S. National Historic Landmark
- U.S. Historic district – Contributing property
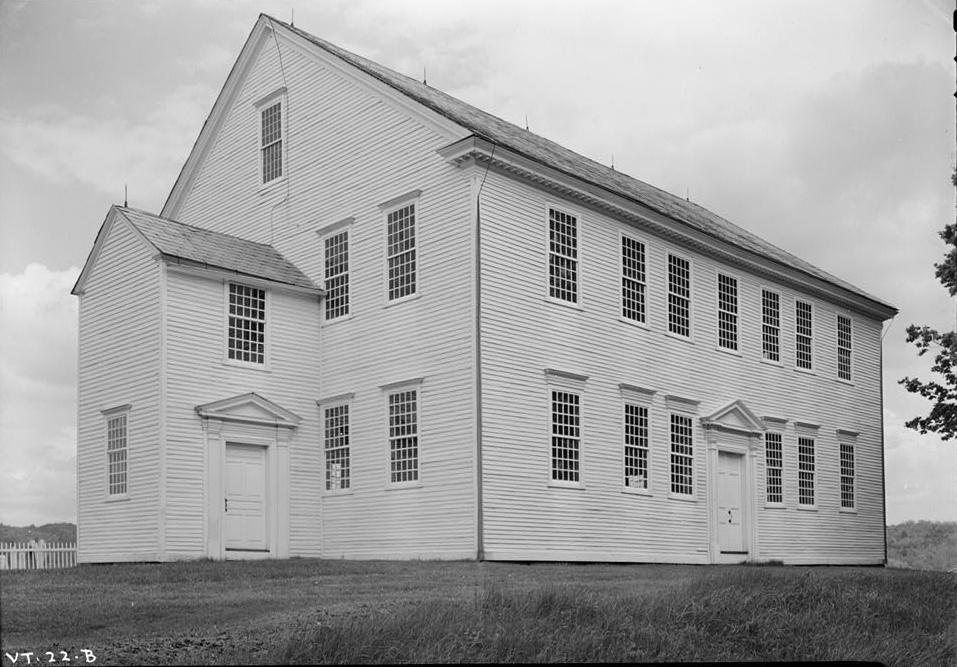
- Front of the Meeting House

- Location within Vermont Location within the United States
- Location: Off VT 103, Rockingham, Vermont
- Coordinates: 43°11′16″N 72°29′12.8″W
- Area: 4.4 acres (18,000 m^{2})
- Built: 1787–1801
- Architect: General John Fuller
- Part of: Rockingham Village Historic District (ID07001346)
- NRHP reference No.: 79000232

Significant dates
- Added to NRHP: September 10, 1979
- Designated NHL: May 16, 2000
- Designated CP: January 4, 2008

The Rockingham Meeting House, also known as Old North Meeting House and First Church in Rockingham, is a historic civic and religious building on Meeting House Road in Rockingham, Vermont, United States. The Meeting House was built between 1787 and 1801 and was originally used for both Congregational church meetings as well as civic and governmental meetings. Church services ceased in 1839 but town meetings continued to be held in it until 1869. It was restored in 1906 and has been preserved.

It was designated a National Historic Landmark in 2000 as an exceptionally well-preserved "second period" colonial-style meeting house. The building, owned by the town, is available for weddings and other events under rules established by the town.

== Description and history ==
The Rockingham Meeting House is set on the north side of Meeting House Road, on a parcel of land about 4 acres (1.6 ha) in size that it shares with the town's original burial ground, whose oldest marked graves date to 1776. Meeting House Road is the location of Rockingham's original town center, laid out after the French and Indian War ended in 1763, with the overall victory of Great Britain against France in the Seven Years' War.

The building is a large two-story timber-frame structure, with a side-gable roof, clapboard siding, and a granite foundation. The main (south-facing) facade is five bays wide, with a symmetrical but slightly irregular placement of windows around the center entry. The main entrance is flanked by pilasters and topped by an entablature and triangular pediment. Enclosed two-story gable-roofed stairwell ells extend from the each side of the building, with a similarly decorated south-facing entrance. The main entrance opens into a central hallway, through a floor filled with box pews to the pulpit area, which features the original sounding board. The second-floor gallery, which wraps around three sides of the building, is also lined with box pews. The elevated pulpit area is 7 feet (2.1 m) wide, and is accessed by stairs on its left side. The pulpit is one of the few unoriginal elements of the building having been restored in 1906. The only other significant alterations have been to replace windows.

The town of Rockingham was first settled by primarily Anglo-American colonists after the French and Indian War ended in 1763. Discussion about the construction of a meeting house began in 1771, and culminated in the construction of a building at this site in 1774. That building remained in use until the construction of the current one, which was approved by the town meeting in 1787. Documentation is unclear about when the building was completed: the first recorded town meeting was held in this building in 1792, at which time it was not complete. The town in that year approved use of the building by local Christian congregations for services.

Over the ensuing years, the various church congregations built their own buildings. The original Congregational group ended its services here in 1838, as people's religious affiliations changed. The building continued to be used for town meetings until a new town hall was constructed in Bellows Falls in 1869. The original pulpit was removed about 1850, and most of the original benches lining the pulpit area were removed. Although the building was vacant for many years, its exterior was maintained. The interior was subjected to vandalism and the theft of artifacts, including door hardware and hand-cut nails.

After being unused for many years, the building was restored by the town in 1906. The first Old Home Day and Pilgrimage to the Meeting House was held in August 1907. It narrowly escaped the fire which burned much of the adjacent Rockingham Village on April 14, 1908. A Meeting House Association was formed in 1911 through the efforts of Professor Franklin Hooper, director of the Museum of the Brooklyn Institute. Hooper was the great-great-grandson of one of the original members of the First Church of Rockingham at its organization in 1773.

The building was listed on the National Register of Historic Places in 1979, and was declared a National Historic Landmark in 2000. It is an extremely well-preserved example of a "second period" colonial meeting house, in which the principal entrance was on the long wall. Its setting is still reminiscent of how it would have appeared at the time of its construction. Its landmark designation includes the building, cemetery, and receiving tomb.

== See also ==
- Oldest churches in the United States
- List of the oldest buildings in Vermont
- List of National Historic Landmarks in Vermont
- National Register of Historic Places listings in Windham County, Vermont
