= Customs Regulation 3295/94 =

Regulation (EC) No 3295/94
- European Union regulation
- Title: Regulation laying down measures to prohibit the release for free circulation, export, re-export or entry for a suspensive procedure of counterfeit and pirated goods
- Made by: Council of the European Union
- Made under: Art. 113
- Journal reference: L341, 1994-12-30, pp. 8–13

History
- Date made: 1994-12-22
- Entry into force: 1995-01-02

Preparative texts
- Commission proposal: C238, 1993-09-02, p. 9
- EESC opinion: C52, 1994-02-19, p. 37
- EP opinion: C61, 1994-02-28
- Reports

Other legislation
- Replaces: Regulation (EEC) No 3842/86
- Amends: Regulation (EEC) No 2913/92
- Amended by: —
- Replaced by: EU Customs Regulation 1383/2003

Council Regulation (EC) No 3295/94 of 22 December 1994 laying down measures to prohibit the release for free circulation, export, re-export or entry for a suspensive procedure of counterfeit and pirated goods, or for short Customs Regulation 3295/94, is a European Union regulation modifying the Community Customs Code.

The EU Customs Regulation 1383/2003 came into force on July 1, 2004, and replaced the former Regulation 3295/94.

== See also ==
- Directive on the enforcement of intellectual property rights (2004/48/EC)
- Directive on criminal measures aimed at ensuring the enforcement of intellectual property rights (proposed)
- Copyright law of the European Union
- Community Trade Mark
- European Union patent law
- Copyright infringement
