= Asset freezing =

Legal process for seizing assets

Asset freezing is a form of interim or interlocutory injunction which prevents a defendant to an action from dealing with or dissipating its assets so as to frustrate a potential judgment. It is widely recognised in other common law jurisdictions and such orders can be made to have world-wide effect. It is variously construed as part of a court's inherent jurisdiction to restrain breaches of its process.

== Origins in Mareva ==
The legal order itself is in the form of an injunction, which in Commonwealth jurisdictions is also known as a freezing order, Mareva injunction, Mareva order or Mareva regime, after the 1975 case Mareva Compania Naviera SA v International Bulkcarriers SA, although the first recorded instance of such an order in English jurisprudence was Nippon Yusen Kaisha v Karageorgis, decided one month before Mareva. The Civil Procedure Rules 1998 now define a Mareva injunction as a "freezing order".

In England and Wales, the jurisdiction to issue an asset freezing order arises in part from the Judicature Act 1873, which provided that "A mandamus or an injunction may be granted or a receiver appointed by an interlocutory Order of the Court in all cases in which it shall appear to the Court to be just or convenient". Relying on this, Jessel MR in 1878 declared, "I have unlimited power to grant an injunction in any case where it would be right or just to do so".

Asset freezing is not a security, nor a means to pressure a judgment debtor, nor is it a type of asset forfeiture since it does not confer upon anyone else a proprietary interest in the defendant's assets. However, some authorities have treated the Mareva injunction as an order to stop a judgment debtor from dissipating his assets so as to have the effect of frustrating judgment, rather than the more strenuous test of requiring an intent to abuse court procedure. An example of the former would be paying off a legitimate debt, whereas an example of the latter would be hiding the assets in overseas banks on receiving notice of the action.

A freezing order will usually only be made where the claimant can show that there was at least a good arguable case that they would succeed at trial and that the refusal of an injunction would involve a real risk that a judgment or award in their favour would remain unsatisfied. It is recognised as being quite harsh on defendants because the order is often granted at the pre-trial stage in ex parte hearings, based on affidavit evidence alone.

To prevent potential injustice and abuse of the court's powers in an ex parte proceeding, moving parties are required to provide full and frank disclosure at such proceeding. The moving party must make a balanced presentation of the facts and law, including all relevant facts and law which may explain the respondent's position if known to the moving party, even if such facts would not have changed the court's decision. If the court is misled on a material fact, or if there is less than full and frank disclosure, the court will typically not continue the injunction.

A Mareva injunction is often combined with an Anton Piller order in these circumstances. This can be disastrous for a defendant as the cumulative effect of these orders can be to destroy the whole of a business' custom by freezing most of its assets and revealing important information to its competitors, and the two orders have been described by Lord Donaldson as being the law's "nuclear weapons".

A motion for Mareva injunction is also frequently brought together with a Norwich Pharmacal order, or more commonly known as a tracing order. A Norwich Pharmacal order is form of pre-action discovery that allows an aggrieved party to trace otherwise hidden or dissipated assets, with a view to their preservation.

=== Application ===
While it is not advisable to obtain such an order on purely strategic grounds, asset freezing has a persuasive effect on settlement negotiations. While a claimant obtaining an order can expect to face subsequent opposition in court from the defendant, the freezing order is generally considered to be the beginning of the end for the defendant as they will be unable to defend themselves with very limited or no available income. The claimant will have no restrictions on legal fee spending, putting huge financial pressure on the defendant, and negotiation and settlement avoid the return to court.

In many jurisdictions, freezing injunctions brought ex parte are only granted for a very short period, usually a few days. At the end of this period, the moving party is required to return to court to justify the continuance of the injunction, this time with notice to the opposing party, so as to allow the latter a chance to contest the injunction on its merits.

Current orders issued by the court do not generally call for a blanket freezing of assets, and they are currently worded in more nuanced terms according to the situation concerned.

The process is regarded as a high-stakes exercise for several reasons:

1. The application is almost always made without notice, to prevent the fraudster defendant from spiriting away their assets before the freezing order is granted. Applicant's counsel is therefore required to make full and frank disclosure of all material facts, and the applicable law, to the court.
2. As with most injunctions, the applicant must provide an undertaking to the court to compensate the defendant for any damage caused by the order.
3. A freezing order that is improperly or sloppily obtained, or one that is drafted too broadly or imprecisely, will cost the party, and its counsel, heavily in terms of credibility with the court.

=== Extension to EU ===
Similar provision can be found in the exercise of:

- "arrestment on the dependence" under Scots law and
- saisie conservatoire under French law.

It has been extended to other members of the European Union, by virtue of Article 9(2) of the Directive on the enforcement of intellectual property rights. Since January 2017, a uniform European Account Preservation Order has been implemented in all EU member states (other than Denmark and the United Kingdom).

=== United States ===
Mareva was rejected by the Supreme Court of the United States in 1999 in Grupo Mexicano de Desarrollo, S.A. v. Alliance Bond Fund, Inc. For the majority, Justice Scalia held that, as such jurisdiction did not exist at the time of the passage of the Judiciary Act of 1789, the federal courts had no authority to exercise it. In dissent, Justice Ginsburg asserted that the federal courts' exercise of its equity jurisdiction was never that static. While Grupo Mexicano is consistent with other Supreme Court jurisprudence in the matter of preliminary injunctions, there has been debate as to whether this decision should be reversed.

At the state level, the New York Court of Appeals, in 2000, reached a conclusion in Credit Agricole v. Rossiyskiy similar to that of the Supreme Court.

In place of Mareva, US civil jurisprudence relies more on prejudgment writs of attachment, preliminary injunctions and temporary restraining orders, which have a more limited scope of application.

== Nature of order ==
Although it is mistakenly believed that a freezing injunction provides security over the defendant's assets for a possible judgment, or secures a judgment already obtained, Lord Donaldson MR explained in Polly Peck International Plc v Nadir that such is not the case:

So far as it lies in their power, the courts will not permit the course of justice to be frustrated by a defendant taking action, the purpose of which is to render nugatory or less effective any judgment or order which the plaintiff may thereafter obtain.

1. It is not the purpose of a Mareva injunction to prevent a defendant acting as he would have acted in the absence of a claim against him. Whilst a defendant who is a natural person can and should be enjoined from indulging in a spending spree undertaken with the intention of dissipating or reducing his assets before the day of judgment, he cannot be required to reduce his ordinary standard of living with a view to putting by sums to satisfy a judgment which may or may not be given in the future. Equally no defendant, whether a natural or a juridical person, can be enjoined in terms which will prevent him from carrying on his business in the ordinary way or from meeting his debts or other obligations as they come due prior to judgment being given in the action.
2. Justice requires that defendants be free to incur and discharge obligations in respect of professional advice and assistance in resisting the plaintiff's claims.
3. It is not the purpose of a Mareva injunction to render the plaintiff a secured creditor, although this may be the result if the defendant offers a third party guarantee or bond in order to avoid such an injunction being imposed.
4. The approach called for by the decision in American Cyanamid Co v Ethicon Ltd has, as such, no application to the grant or refusal of Mareva injunctions which proceed on principles which are quite different from those applicable to other interlocutory injunctions.

In 2007, Lord Bingham declared:

Mareva (or freezing) injunctions were from the beginning, and continue to be, granted for an important but limited purpose: to prevent a defendant dissipating his assets with the intention or effect of frustrating enforcement of a prospective judgment. They are not a proprietary remedy. They are not granted to give a claimant advance security for his claim, although they may have that effect. They are not an end in themselves. They are a supplementary remedy, granted to protect the efficacy of court proceedings, domestic or foreign.

=== Current scope ===
In Group Seven, Hildyard J outlined the current scope of freezing orders that can be issued by the Court:

1. It is designed to prevent injustice to a successful claimant by preserving assets and funds from being disposed of or dissipated before a judgment is satisfied.
2. "His assets" refers to "assets belonging to that person, not to assets belonging to another person" and without words clearly extending the scope of the phrase "his assets", assets owned beneficially by someone else will not be subject to the freezing order.
3. A freezing order is a precautionary measure taken urgently to protect the claimant against the risk of dissipation, disposal, reduction in value, or loss of assets pending a fuller examination as to what assets would in reality be available to the claimant for the purposes of enforcing a judgment.
4. If the words are ambiguous, or admit of a more restrictive interpretation, so that it is arguable whether or not the assets in question fall within their scope, the court is unlikely to treat a dealing with such assets as a contempt of court.
5. "Assets" also covers assets which are not in the legal ownership of the defendant but in respect of which the defendant "retains the power to direct how the assets should be dealt with."
6. The phrase "his assets" is extended to include also "assets held by a foreign trust or a Liechtenstein Anstalt when the defendant retains beneficial ownership or effective control of the asset."
7. It is clear that those words in the standard form do not extend to assets of which the defendant remains the legal owner but holds for the benefit of someone else.
8. If it is desired and found appropriate to extend the scope of the injunction to assets held in trust (in the case of a façade or sham), additional wording must be included to make that clear, and the Court will only do this sparingly.
9. As to piercing or lifting the corporate veil, ownership and control of a company are not themselves sufficient to provide justification for that course, even when no unconnected third party is involved and it might be perceived that the interests of justice would be served by it.
10. Even where the circumstances are such as to justify the exceptional step of piercing or lifting the corporate veil, the effect is not to alter the beneficial ownership of the company's assets: it is simply to provide for such asset to be available in defined circumstances to the claimant.

In 2014, Lakatamia emphasized that the assets of a company wholly owned by a person subject to a freezing order are not automatically subject to the order. In that case, Rimer J noted:

The owner is of course able to control the destiny of the company's assets. But that does not make them his assets... First, [the order] is still only concerned with dispositions of assets belonging beneficially to the defendant, which these assets do not. Secondly, Mr Su has no authority to instruct the companies how to deal with their assets. All he has is the power, as an agent of the company, to procure the company to make dispositions of its assets. Such dispositions, when made, are made in consequence of decisions made by the organs of the company. They are not dispositions made by the company in compliance with instructions from Mr Su. That may seem to be a somewhat formal distinction. But it is a valid one: only the companies have authority to deal with and dispose of their assets.

However, the person's shares in the company are subject to it, and any conduct by him (not in the course of ordinary business) that diminishes the value of those shares will infringe that order.

=== Chabra relief ===
Subsequent jurisprudence has extended the reach of freezing orders to third parties against whom there is no substantive cause of action, but where there is good reason to suppose that their assets may in truth be the assets of the defendant against whom a cause of action is asserted. This type of order is known as Chabra relief, and has been described as possessing certain characteristics:

1. It may be exercised where there is good reason to suppose that assets held in the name of a defendant against whom the claimant asserts no cause of action (the NCAD) would be amenable to some process, ultimately enforceable by the courts, by which the assets would be available to satisfy a judgment against a defendant whom the claimant asserts to be liable upon his substantive claim (the CAD).
2. The test of "good reason to suppose" is that of a good arguable case.
3. The jurisdiction will be exercised where it is just and convenient to do so.
4. Assets will be treated as in truth the assets of the CAD if they are held as nominee or trustee for it as the ultimate beneficial owner.
5. Substantial control by the CAD over the assets in the name of the NCAD is often a relevant consideration, but substantial control is not the test for the existence and exercise of the Chabra jurisdiction. It is relevant where there is a question of beneficial ownership, and where there is a real risk that assets may be dissipated in the absence of a freezing order.

=== Available alternatives ===
Depending on the circumstances, alternative types of orders may be more attractive to an applicant:

1. orders preserving property or securing a specified fund (where the balance of convenience favours making such an order),
2. a proprietary injunction (i.e., one that covers a specific asset or assets, as opposed to the defendant's assets in general),
3. the appointment of a receiver to hold assets of the defendant (where the injunction is insufficient on its own and where there is a measurable risk that a defendant will act in breach of the injunction), or
4. the appointment of a provisional liquidator (where the applicant is likely to obtain a winding-up order on the hearing of the petition).

A "third party debt order" (which consists of an interim freezing order and a final order requiring the third party to pay the debt to the judgment creditor) is available to secure payment of County Court judgments.

== Extrajudicial application: "Mareva by letter" ==
Informal de facto freezing may also be undertaken in most common law jurisdictions by a third-party guardian or assetholder, where he has been informed that those assets are imposed with a constructive trust in favour of someone other than the apparent owner. The freeze may be effected by issuing a letter to the asset holder or guardian in question, informing them of the true origin or beneficial ownership of the targeted funds or assets, and advising them of their potential accessory civil and possible criminal liability in the event of any transfer or disposal of the assets in question. Such devices may be employed in cases where a victim of fraud suspects that targeted funds or assets may be transferred to another location where it might be impractical to gain access to them. However, the use of this technique within the United States is not generally accepted.

== See also ==
- Asset forfeiture
- Injunction
- Anton Piller order
- Norwich Pharmacal Order
- Restraint order
