= Statutory Foundation (United States) =

Type of legal entity

A Statutory Foundation (commonly abbreviated as SF or S.F.) is a legal entity form created by the State of Wyoming by the passage of the Wyoming Statutory Foundation Act, (effective July 1, 2019). The act provides for the creation of an entity that may be structured (depending on the terms of the operating agreement) as a trust, a business entity or a hybrid. The Act provides for protection against creditors, limited liability, and an entity form that is similar to foundations found in Civil Law countries. A Wyoming Statutory Foundation is capable of doing business in its own name, similar to a corporation, partnership or LLC, and it may serve charitable or private purposes.

== General provisions ==
In general, a Wyoming Statutory Foundation makes provisions for a Founder, an Operating agreement (similar to a Foundation Charter), a Board of Directors (similar to Trustees or a Foundation Council), Beneficiaries and Protectors. The beneficial interest in a statutory foundation can (by default) be held as undivided interest in the statutory foundation, or attached to specific foundation property (similar to a trust), or can have a different structure as per the operating agreement (allowing the statutory foundation to qualify as a different business entity—a corporation, partnership or disregarded entity). The statutory foundation may have discretionary beneficiaries determined by the board of directors and the operating agreement.

== Beneficiaries, beneficial interests, beneficial owners ==
Beneficiaries (and others) may hold and transfer beneficial interests in the foundation, subject to restrictions in the operating agreement. Beneficial interests are deemed personal property and do not generate a right to specific foundation property unless expressly provided for in the operating agreement. Beneficial owners hold ownership of income and assets of the foundation (generally undivided interests similar to trustees) and may be different from the holders of beneficial interests. The statutory foundation may have discretionary beneficiaries determined by the board of directors and the operating agreement.

== Protection against creditors, and limited liability ==
Limited liability is achieved by separating the debts and obligations of the statutory foundation from the debts and obligations of the directors and founders by statute. Protection of beneficial owners against creditors is provided for in the statutes, allowing for separation of assets of the foundation from the assets of the founder or beneficiaries.

== Flexibility and uses ==
A statutory foundation is typically used in asset holding structures to hold shares, LLC interests, beneficial ownership of the underlying assets. In a trust context, the statutory foundation can act as a trustee, hold trust powers of a protector, and be the beneficiary of a trust or a beneficiary of another statutory foundation. In partnership structures, it can act as a general partner or a limited partner of the partnership. A number of potential uses are identified in legal commentary: Foundations in the Wild West: The Wyoming Statutory Foundation Act

== Comparison with New Hampshire Foundation Law ==
Unlike the New Hampshire Foundation Act, which is drafted to very closely resemble a trust under US law, the Wyoming Statutory Foundation is drafted to closely resemble an Anstalt (a hybrid of a corporation and a trust) and a Stiftung. As a new legal entity, it is relatively untested in the courts, with limited US case law.
