= Guide du rôliste galactique =

French online encyclopedia of role-playing games

Le Guide du rôliste galactique
- Website type: Role-playing game
- Available in: French
- Website: Le Guide du rôliste galactique
- Commercial: No
- Launched: 2000; 26 years ago
- Current status: Active

The Guide du rôliste galactique (French for Galactic Roleplayer's Guide), shortened as Grog, GRoG or GROG, is a French-language online encyclopedia of tabletop roleplaying games, launched in 2000. The website is handled by a non-profit organisation of the same name.

== Website structure ==
The website is based on a database that aims to offer a neutral and factual description of publications (authors, publisher, date of publication, content, etc.) as well as a general description of the product range it belongs to. The website has an encyclopedic part that lists books of roleplaying games, with sheets that describe products, ranges, authors, illustrators and publishers; indie games also have sheets. The website also hosts reviews: readers can publish their review of a product. Finally, the Grog has a smaller magazine-like activity, publishing news, interviews and dossiers.

== History ==
=== 2000-2008: First version ===
The website was launched in May 2000 by a group of students from Grenoble. The website has been administrated by a French association of the same name, started in January 2000. The website's first version stayed online from 2000 to 2008, under the domain name roliste.com. The creation of the Guide du rôliste galactique is part of a broader wave of new roleplaying game websites, with English-language websites like RPG.net in 1996 or Places to Go, People to Be in 1998, and French-language websites such as La Scénariothèque in 1996, Le Site de l'elfe noir (later renamed as SDEN) in 1997) and discussion boards such as CasusNO in 2001. The Finnish roleplaying game magazine Roolipelaaja puts the Grog's creation in the context of that period, in the late 1990's and early 2000's, when tabletop roleplaying games in France suffered from lower sales and a lull in specialized magazines: Internet and gaming conventions thus became the main factor of unity for roleplaying game enthusiasts, possibly explaining the drive behind a website aiming to catalogue all of published games.

After one year, the website listed 200 game ranges, 1600 products and 1500 user-contributed reviews.

Some of the news published on the Grog's website were republished in the second version of print magazine Casus Belli, starting in issue 21 in 2003. In 2006, the Grog set up a shared calendar of events and roleplaying game conventions with the websites of the Fédération française de jeu de rôle and the Site de l'elfe noir (SDEN) to facilitate its upkeep. The technical architecture of this calendar allowed it to be shared by several websites: about forty in spring 2006.

In 2008, the website had 12 administrators and around 80 writers.

=== Second version of the website, starting in 2009 ===
After internal conflict inside the association, the website became unavailable for a few days, and then worked as a blog under the new domain name legrog.org from October 2008 to May 2009, before getting back to normal. On this occasion, the website's technical infrastructure was entirely revised. The association published a public apology. and bought back its old domain address roliste.com, while also keeping legrog.org. By then, the website listed 8000 products from 800 game ranges

In 2019, the Grog listed roughly 11000 game products.

== Contributions to the Grog ==
The regular members of the Grog (called matelots, or sailors) are separate from the association: there is no need for contributors to belong to the association, or for association members to contribute to the website. The factsheets are written by these matelots and proofread then validated by officiers and sous-officiers. Validation criteria include quality and ethics (people who have directly worked on a game can't write its factsheet, to avoid advertorials). In 2024, 20 to 30 product factsheets are added to the website each week on average. The association accepts donations.

Most of the Grog's works are collective works (factsheets, news...), others remain the propriety of their authors (reviews, articles, the website's design), and some elements remain the propriety of game publishers (product illustrations, etc.). Its content is thus protected by copyright laws.

=== Partnerships ===
With the agreement of right owners, the Grog can publish, among its reviews, articles from magazines or other websites. It thus includes reviews from Casus Belli, with a distinction between its different incarnations, Jeu de rôle magazine, Le Maraudeur, Présence d'esprits, Jeux d'ombres and 2d+3 (a TV show from Canal Web).

== The Grog d'or ==
The Grog d'or (golden Grog) is an award for the best tabletop roleplaying game of the year, awarded by the association since 2001 to both French and foreign games. Each month, Grog contributors gather to elect a game of the month among the games that have had a recent activity in the website's factsheets. Each year, the Grog d'or is elected among these games of the month. This award was as of 2012 the only French RPG award.

=== List of Grog d'or recipients ===
- 2001: Blue Planet
- 2002: Nobilis
- 2003: Transhuman Space
- 2004: Orpheus
- 2005: Vermine
- 2006: COPS
- 2007: Warhammer
- 2008: Warhammer 40k
- 2009: Hellywood
- 2010: Doctor Who
- 2011: Tenga
- 2012: Würm
- 2013: Apocalypse World
- 2014: Star Wars - Edge of the Empire
- 2015: Dungeons & Dragons (5th edition)
- 2016: Sombre
- 2017: Degenesis
- 2018: Brigandyne
- 2019: Meute
- 2020: Dieux ennemis
- 2021: Le Cabinet des murmures
- 2022: Knight
- 2023: Dune: Adventures in the Imperium
- 2024: City of Mist
- 2025: Sans Cœur
- 2026: Babel

== Academic analysis ==
In 2007, sociologist Olivier Caïra describes the Grog as "the most important French-language database of role-playing games", such that at that moment, the website constituted for him "one of the two pillars of the French non-profit role-playing community" (the other was the Fédération française de jeu de rôle). Coralie David links the Grog with role-playing publications, since the reviews and opinions published on the website make it play a prescriptive role similar to that of magazines; the Grog is for her "the first in terms of prescription" among websites dealing with this hobby.

In 2024, Sanne Stijve and David Robert analyzed the Grog's database and showed how it could be used as a ressource for research work on tabletop role-playing games. According to them, the database was "without equal in quality and completeness" and belonged to "roleplayers' heritage". They also showed its limits, such as the fact that, since volunteers were mostly French speakers, the database is very complete and representative for French-published games, but may be less so for languages that volunteers can't read. They also mention two possible limits: the centers of interest of the volunteers who write factsheets; and the fact that some publishers send their new products to the Grog as part of their press office, which can lead to these publishers being over-represented.

== See also ==
- RPGnet
- BoardGameGeek
