= Saisie-contrefaçon =

Under French law, the saisie-contrefaçon is a means of proof of the infringement and, more generally, any violation of an intellectual property right. This procedure permits the holder of the intellectual property right, upon receiving the authorisation of a judge, to call upon a bailiff (in certain cases, a police commissioner or a judge) to record an infringement. In France, the saisie-contrefaçon is one of the most widely used means of obtaining evidence of the existence and extent of an infringement of intellectual property rights.

== One of the means of proof of the infringement ==
The infringement of intellectual property rights is a legal fact and, as such, any means may be used to provide evidence thereof. Therefore, evidence may be provided using all the means of proof permitted by civil law (or by criminal law if the proceedings are initiated before a criminal court), such as witness statements, presumptions, bailiff reports and expert investigations, but also by using the saisie-contrefaçon, a procedure specifically intended to obtain evidence of the infringement of intellectual property rights. Upon authorisation of a judge, this procedure enables the holder of an intellectual property right claiming to be the victim of a violation of this right to have the violation recorded by a bailiff authorised both to enter any place where the infringement might be observed and to seize the items of evidence of the infringement.

== One of the most widely used means of proof ==
The saisie-contrefaçon is very efficient and often decisive in the success or failure of the infringement action; it is therefore the most widely used means of proof in infringement cases.

The remarkable effectiveness of this procedure mainly resides in that it is ex parte and restrictive. The authorisation to perform a saisie-contrefaçon is requested of the President of the tribunal de grande instance with jurisdiction over the territory in question, in ex parte proceedings. Yet Article R. 211-7 of the French Judicial Organisation Code provides for the exclusive jurisdiction of the President of the Tribunal de grande instance de Paris for actions in the fields of Community designs and trademarks. The proceedings are ex parte, i.e. without hearing the other party: the requesting party, represented by its attorney-at-law, presents its request to the judge; the person targeted by the saisie-contrefaçon measure is not informed and does not take part in the proceedings. Therefore, the saisie-contrefaçon ordered by the judge will benefit from the element of surprise; until the very last moment, the targeted person is not informed of what is going on and therefore cannot move or dispose of the evidence of its infringing activity (the result is the same when, in matters of copyright and related rights, a police commissioner, or even a judge, is requested to carry out a saisie-contrefaçon, see French Intellectual Property Code, Art. L. 332-1 and L. 332-4). The great practical effectiveness of the saisie-contrefaçon also lies in its restrictive nature, since the judge, by granting an order to perform a saisie-contrefaçon, authorises the requesting party to call upon a bailiff to enter the premises of the targeted person or even of third parties (if evidence is likely to be found there) to perform the saisie-contrefaçon investigations, regardless of whether or not the premises are normally open to the public.

The saisie-contrefaçon is generally decisive in the success or failure of the action for infringement. If it is correctly performed and cannot be challenged or remains unchallenged, it will provide evidence of an infringement for which the judge ruling on the merits in the infringement proceedings cannot but pronounce civil or criminal sanctions, thereby ensuring the success of the holder of the intellectual property right over the infringer. If it is incorrectly performed, challenged and declared void, it generally leads to the failure of the infringement action on the merits as it fails to produce evidence of the infringement. All other means of proof certainly remain effective in theory, but in practice, they are far from being as efficient as the saisie-contrefaçon, to the extent that the failure of the saisie-contrefaçon often means that the infringement action will fail.

Considering the decisive nature of the saisie-contrefaçon, the dispute with relation to its being valid or void is very significant. The alleged infringer, in addition to arguing that the intellectual property right at issue is invalid, will naturally tend to put forward any and all arguments supporting the nullity of the saisie-contrefaçon, in order to destroy such a decisive item of evidence against it.

The ex parte and restrictive nature of the saisie-contrefaçon, which makes it so efficient, can also be perceived as a possible source of abuse. It is possible that an economic operator might be tempted, under the pretext of the alleged infringement of its intellectual property right, to misuse the saisie-contrefaçon procedure in order to enter the premises of a competitor and try to obtain some of its industrial and trade secrets. However, first of all, in order to avoid such a risk, the judge has the option of preserving the confidentiality of the information gathered during the saisie-contrefaçon. Moreover, it is an established principle that the saisie-contrefaçon investigations are the responsibility of the requesting party and that the judge, when rendering the order for a saisie-contrefaçon, can order the requesting party to furnish security to compensate the seized party for any loss it may suffer, in case it later appears that the saisie-contrefaçon was abusive. Practitioners are aware of these rules which the courts apply with great care, and abuses are the exception.

== By anyone having standing to sue for infringement ==
Since French Act No. 2007-1544 of 29 October 2007, this expression is used in almost all the articles of the French Intellectual Property Code relating to the saisie-contrefaçon to refer to the person entitled to request it. Simply put, the persons having standing to request a saisie-contrefaçon are generally the holders of the allegedly infringed intellectual property right and the exclusive licensees – after the right holder has been notified and yet taken no action. The person having standing to request the saisie-contrefaçon does not have to provide evidence of the alleged infringement as the saisie-contrefaçon precise goal is to gather evidence. However, the requesting party must duly justify both the existence of an intellectual property right in force and its standing to request the saisie-contrefaçon.

== In order to obtain evidence of the infringement ==
The saisie-contrefaçon order handed down by the judge authorises the requesting party to dispatch the bailiff of its choice, possibly accompanied by an expert, of its choice or by a member of the police force, to any place where proof of the infringement might be found, to make either a "detailed description" of the elements found in his report – a description that can be accompanied by the taking of samples – or a "physical seizure", i.e. the confiscation of the elements found and attached to the report, again drafted by the bailiff to record the operations performed. The saisie-contrefaçon may relate to infringing products, documents relating to the infringement but also materials and implements used in the production or diffusion of the infringing goods. In the particular field of copyright and related rights, illustrating the sometimes more protective than probative nature of the saisie-contrefaçon (see below France – Background), the President of the competent tribunal de grande instance may also order the following: the suspension of any manufacturing in progress involved in the unlawful reproduction of a work (or of the object of a related right) or in the violation of the protection or information technical measures; the seizure of monetary proceeds from any reproduction, performance or diffusion, by whatever means, of an intellectual work (or of the object of a related right) carried out in violation of the author’s rights or deriving from a violation of the protection or information technical measures; the handing over to a third party of the unlawful works or the products suspected of being unlawful in order to prevent that they be introduced or circulated in commercial channels (French Intellectual Property Code, Art. L. 332-1).

== Evidence of the existence and extent of the infringement ==
The elements that can be gathered from the saisie-contrefaçon can be useful for proving both the existence of the alleged infringement (for example by taking samples of the infringing products) and the extent thereof (in particular by making copies of accounting documents of the person accused of infringement, which make it possible to assess the infringing sales and the economic damage suffered by the holder of the infringed intellectual property right).

== Evidence of the infringement of intellectual property rights ==
Since French Act No. 2007-1544 of 29 October 2007, a saisie-contrefaçon may be performed for all intellectual property rights (see French Intellectual Property Code, Art. L. 332-1 - copyright and related rights, Art. L. 332-4 – software and databases, Art. L.°343-1 –sui generis right of the producer of databases, Art. L. 615-5 – patents, Art. L. 521-4 – designs, Art. L. 622-7 – topographies of semiconductor products, Art. L. 623-27-1 – plant variety rights, Art. L. 716-7 – trademarks, Art. L. 722-4 – geographical designations). Yet the saisie-contrefaçon is not subject to a single unified legal regime. The French Intellectual Property Code contains, for every intellectual property right, an article that specifically applies to the saisie-contrefaçon. While the saisie-contrefaçon regime, thus spread between so many different articles and different rights, is very homogeneous in the field of industrial property, it is quite different and much less homogeneous in the field of literary and artistic property.

== France – Background ==
The saisie-contrefaçon was introduced into French law by the Decree of 19–24 July 1793, which is the first general text concerning the rights of authors of intellectual works, for the protection of the right of reproduction (it was not applicable in the case of a violation of a performance right). At that time, only police commissioners and Justices of the Peace (the predecessors of instance court judges) were entitled to carry out a saisie-contrefaçon. The saisie-contrefaçon was conceived more as a type of protective measure (and was characterised as such by previous laws) than as a probative measure. The saisie-contrefaçon therefore had a monitoring and even criminal and protective nature, certain traits of which have remained in practice (for example, deposit of the seized objects at the court clerk’s office). The remarkable effectiveness of the saisie-contrefaçon led to its progressive extension – recently through French Act No. 2007-1544 of 29 October 2007 – to all intellectual property rights, its criminal and protective nature correspondingly tending to diminish in favour of a probative nature. Today, the saisie-contrefaçon has an exclusively probative nature, except in the field of copyright and related rights where, for the historical reasons set out above, it has also retained its protective nature.

== Europe ==
Prior to Directive No. 2004/48/EC, the saisie-contrefaçon was only known as such in France and in Belgium (where it was rather referred to a "saisie-description" (descriptive seizure)). Certain countries employed measures that could have a relatively similar practical effect (Italy, Spain, or even the United Kingdom with the Anton Piller orders). However, other countries had no specific probative measure in the field of infringement, which was a serious obstacle to the enforcement of intellectual property rights. The saisie-contrefaçon is a probative measure now intended to exist in all the member states of the European Union as a result of Directive No. 2004/48/EC. The Community legislator took as a basis the French saisie-contrefaçon as well as the Anton Piller orders in the United Kingdom to require the Member States to introduce into their legislation prompt and effective "measures for preserving evidence", and in particular to make it possible to obtain, upon request, "the detailed description, with or without the taking of samples, or the physical seizure of the infringing goods, and, in appropriate cases, the materials and implements used in the production and/or distribution of these goods and the documents relating thereto" (Dir. No. 2004/48, Art. 7).
