= Customs Regulation 1383/2003 =

European Union customs regulation

Regulation (EC) No. 1383/03
- European Union regulation
- Title: Regulation concerning customs action against goods suspected of infringing certain intellectual property rights and the measures to be taken against goods found to have infringed such rights
- Made by: Council
- Made under: Art. 133
- Journal reference: L196, pp. 7-14

History
- Date made: 2003-07-22
- Entry into force: 2003-08-09

Other legislation
- Replaces: Customs Regulation 3295/94

Customs Regulation 1383/2003, the full title of which is Regulation concerning customs action against goods suspected of infringing certain intellectual property rights and the measures to be taken against goods found to have infringed such rights, is a measure passed under Article 133 (formerly Article 113) of the EC Treaty. The provision is designed to protect the intellectual property rights of constituents of member nations.

The provision encourages EU Member States to facilitate cooperation between their respective customs agencies in preventing IP infringement. It supersedes Customs Regulation 3295/94, with the new provision having taken effect (and the former provision expiring) on 1 July 2004.

The provision permits owners of intellectual property rights "to prohibit entry into the EU and the export or re-export from the EU, of goods infringing: trade marks, copyright, patents, national or Community plant variety rights, designations of origin or geographical indications and geographical designations".

The EU Customs Regulation 608/2013 came into force on 19 July 2013 and replaced the former Regulation 1383/2003.

== See also ==
- Directive on criminal measures aimed at ensuring the enforcement of intellectual property rights (proposed)
- Copyright infringement
