= Norwich Pharmacal Co v Customs and Excise Comrs =

1974 English court case

Norwich Pharmacal Co. v Customs and Excise
- Court: House of Lords
- Full case name: Norwich Pharmacal Co. & Ors v Commissioners of Customs and Excise
- Decided: 26 June 1973
- Citation: [1973] 3 WLR 164; [1973] FSR 365; [1973] 2 All ER 943; [1974] RPC 101; [1973] UKHL 6; [1974] AC 133
- Transcript: Full text of judgment

Court membership
- Judges sitting: Lord Reid; Lord Morris of Borth-y-Gest; Viscount Dilhorne; Lord Cross of Chelsea; Lord Kilbrandon

Keywords
- interim injunctions; pre-action disclosure; application notice; quia timet injunctions; joint tortfeasors; freezing orders; search orders; cause of action; preliminary injunctions; locus standi

Norwich Pharmacal Co. & Others v Customs and Excise Commissioners [1974] AC 133 was a case involving the owner and exclusive licensee of a patent, which was infringed by unknown importers of the chemical into the United Kingdom. Norwich Pharmacal Co. brought proceedings against the Excise Commissioners to force the disclosure of information which would identify the importer of the chemical, and therefore those who infringed the patent. The House of Lords held that where a third party had information relating to unlawful conduct, a court could compel them to assist the person suffering damage by giving them that information. The case established the Norwich Pharmacal jurisdiction and disclosure orders against third parties are now known as Norwich Pharmacal orders in the UK.

== The case ==
The case was brought by Norwich Pharmacal Co. and the exclusive licensee of a patent for an antibacterial called furazolidone. Between 1960 and 1970 unlicensed shipments of the chemical were imported into Britain, therefore Norwich Pharmacal Co. knew that its patent was infringed but was unable to identify the importers. The Commissioners for Customs & Excise held information that would identify the importers, but would not disclose this, claiming that they had no authority to give such information. Norwich Pharmacal Co. brought proceedings against the Excise Commissioners, to force the Commissioners to disclose the names of the importers, which were the Intended Defendants. In Norwich Pharmacal Co. v Customs and Excise Commissioners [1974] the House of Lords held that where a third party has information relating to unlawful conduct, a court could compel them to assist the person suffering damage by giving them that information. The judgement is based on the 19th Century procedure known as the bill of discovery. Lord Reid summarised what became known as the Norwich Pharmacal jurisdiction as follows:

...that if through no fault of his own a person gets mixed up in the tortious acts of others so as to facilitate their wrongdoing he may incur no personal liability but he comes under a duty to assist the person who has been wronged by giving him full information and disclosing the identity of the wrongdoers.

== Norwich Pharmacal jurisdiction ==
The 1974 House of Lords ruling in Norwich Pharmacal Co. v Customs and Excise Commissioners established what is known as the Norwich Pharmacal jurisdiction, which allows UK courts to grant disclosure orders, known as Norwich Pharmacal orders, against third parties which have been mixed up in wrongdoing. By identifying individuals the documents and information sought are disclosed in order to assist the applicant for such an order in bringing legal proceedings against individuals who are believed to have wronged the applicant. While first developed in relation to intellectual property, such as patents, Norwich Pharmacal orders are now granted in relation to other torts, as well as defamation and breach of contract, and alleged criminal offences. More recently Norwich Pharmacal orders are used against internet hosting services and internet service providers to identify users who have allegedly engaged in wrongdoing.

== See also ==
- Anton Piller order
