= Copyright law of France =

In France, authors' rights laws (French: droit d’auteur) are a set of exclusive prerogatives available to a creator over his or her intellectual work, as part of the intellectual property area of law. It has been influential in the development of authors' rights laws in other civil law jurisdictions, and in the development of international authors' rights law such as the Berne Convention. It has its roots in the 16th century, before the legal concept of copyright was developed in the United Kingdom. Based on the "rights of the author" instead of on the right to copy, its philosophy and terminology are different from those used in copyright law in common law jurisdictions. The term droit d’auteur reveals that the interests of the author are at the center of the system, not that of the investor.

French authors' rights law is defined in the Code de la propriété intellectuelle, which partly implements European authors' rights law (European Union directive). Two distinct sets of rights are defined:

- Proprietary rights (droits patrimoniaux)
- Moral rights (droits moraux)

== History ==
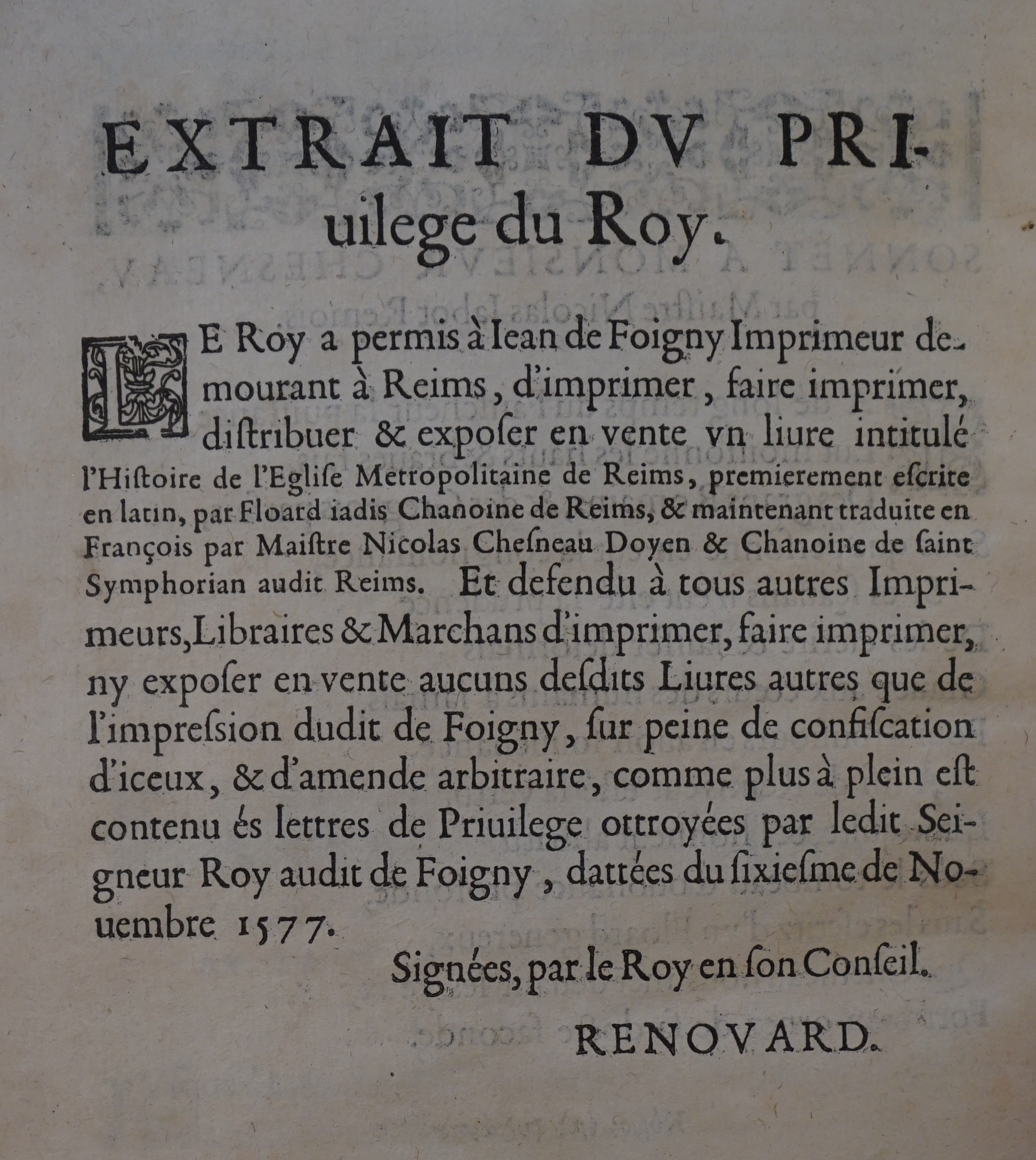
1580, royal printed patent, Carnegie Library of Reims

=== Background ===
The concept of "rights of the author", which distinctly differs from the Anglo-American concept of copyright, finds its roots in the practice of printing patents and royal privileges, which first appeared in the 16th century and became common in the 17th century. The privilege concerned the publication rights to authors' works, rather than authors' rights per se. The first privilege granted in France was given by Henri II in 1551 to Guillaume de Morlaye, his lute player. Through this system of royal privileges, the King granted monopolies to specific editors, and implemented a system of censorship. Privileges were then very short (3 to 10 years), after which the work entered the public domain. The Moulins ordinance of 1566, the first piece of legislation to impose to librarians and editors the request of a printing patent, did not make any mention of authors.

This regime privileged editors over authors, but some authors succeeded in obtaining privileges for their works. During the Muret Affair, in 1568, a lawyer named Marion pleaded for a complete and unrestricted right of property of the author on his work, and intellectual property thus entered the French jurisprudence.

The practice of remunerating authors by some percentage of revenues became common during the 17th century. Playwrights, including Corneille, started to defend their rights because at that time, once a play was published, any troupe could play it without paying anything to its creator. The King thus arbitrated between the rival interests of editors and creators, giving his preference to the former.

In 1761, a court decision granted to Jean de La Fontaine's granddaughters the right of ownership of La Fontaine's work, legitimized by the right of inheritance. In 1777, two other court decisions limited the publisher's right, which was restricted to the life-time of the author.

=== French revolution ===
Such privileges were abolished on the night of 4 August 1789, during the French Revolution. Then the National Convention enacted new legislation. A draft law was proposed by the Abbé Sieyès, which, although allegedly inspired by Condorcet's pamphlet titled Fragments sur la liberté de la presse (Fragments on liberty of the press, 1776), aimed at struggling against the spread of licentious ideas by imposing responsibility for their diffusion on authors, publishers and librarians. Sieyès and Condorcet also advanced the idea of "limited privilege," against perpetual privileges, thus preparing the inclusion in the public domain of the works of Racine, Molière, Rousseau, Voltaire, etc. According to Anne Latournerie, "The first revolutionary attempt to provide to authors a legal recognition of their rights on their texts was therefore not the search of a freedom for authors, but rather the exigency of a responsibility."

After a controversy concerning dramatic authors and their rebellion, the Chénier Act resulted on July 19, 1793. The July 14, 1866 Act extends the rights until 50 years after the death of the author.

=== Concept of intellectual worker ===
Debates continued throughout the 19th century – notably, between Lamartine and Proudhon – and the inter-war period. As early as August 1936 during the Popular Front, the Minister of National Education and of the Beaux-Arts Jean Zay proposed a draft law based on a new philosophy of the author as an "intellectual worker" (travailleur intellectuel) rather than as an "owner" (propriétaire). Jean Zay placed himself in a moral continuum with Alfred de Vigny, Augustin-Charles Renouard and Proudhon, defending the "spiritual interest of the collectivity". Article 21 of his draft divided the 50 years post-mortem protection period into two different phases, one of 10 years and the other of 40 years which established a sort of legal licence suppressing the right of exclusivity granted to a specific editor. Zay's draft project was particularly opposed by the editor Bernard Grasset, who defended the right of the editor as a "creator of value", while many writers, including Jules Romains and the president of the Société des Gens de Lettres, Jean Vignaud, supported Zay's draft. The draft did not succeed, however, in being voted in before the end of the legislature in 1939.

New discussions were undertaken during the Vichy regime, initiated by a corporatist body, presided over by three jurists, François Hepp, René Dommange, and Paul Lerebours-Pigeonnières. Hepp and Dommange had been at the forefront of the battle against Jean Zay's draft law during the Popular Front.

A Commission had been created in August 1944, presided over by the jurist Jean Escarra, who had co-signed in 1937 an essay with François Hepp and Jean Reault, published by Grasset, which harshly criticized Jean Zay's draft project. Extended debate in the Fourth Republic led to a modernized law along the lines of the Vichy proposals with Act No. 57-298 of March 11, 1957. Hepp proudly highlighted the continuity.

=== Authors' rights law of 1957 ===
According to the 1957 authors' rights laws, most works were protected for the duration of the author's life plus 50 years. The 1957 authors' rights laws were substantially modified by Act No. 85-660 of July 3, 1985, which came into force on January 1, 1986. Among other changes, this act introduced various neighbouring rights and increased the length of intellectual property protection for musical compositions to life of the author plus 70 years. These laws were then incorporated into the Intellectual Property Code, enacted on July 1, 1992. Act No. 97-283 of March 27, 1997, increased the authors' rights term of most works from life plus 50 to life plus 70 years. Because the related EU directive required implementation by July 1, 1995, the new authors' rights term was given retroactive effect to that date.

=== Jurisprudence ===
In 1997, a court decision outlawed the publication on the Internet of Raymond Queneau's Hundred Thousand Billion Poems, an interactive poem or sort of machine to produce poems. The court decided that the son of Queneau and the Gallimard editions possessed an exclusive and moral right on this poem, thus outlawing any publication of it on the Internet and possibility for the reader to play Queneau's interactive game of poem construction.

On 8 December 2005 the Tribunal de grande instance de Paris concluded that file sharing through peer-to-peer was not a criminal offense. The judgment was based on the right to "private copy" described in the Intellectual Property Code which includes the use of digital media.

=== DADVSI Act ===
On 7 March 2006, the National Assembly passed the DADVSI Act which implemented—with some modifications—the 2001 Information Society directive of the European Union. The DADVSI act makes peer-to-peer sharing of property rights' protected works an offense. It does allow for sharing of private copies of tape recording and other media. However, there existed considerable differences of opinion as to how to implement the directive, in many respects.

== Protected works ==
The condition for protection of a work under French authors' rights law is that it be an œuvre de l'esprit, a work of the mind and original in form (art. L112-1). Hence there must be a human intellectual contribution to the work. A list of types of work which are protected is given in art. L112-2: this list (taken from the Berne Convention) is not limitative.

The legal protection of computer programs was, and to some extent still is, the subject of much debate in France. Patent protection was first excluded by Loi n°68-1 du 2 janvier 1968 sur les brevets d'invention and defined in authors' rights by Loi n°85-660 du 3 juillet 1985 relative aux droits d'auteur et aux droits des artistes-interprètes, des producteurs de phonogrammes et de vidéogrammes et des entreprises de communication audiovisuelle. The legal position was resolved by the transposition of May 14, 1991 EU Computer Programs Directive into French law: computer programs and any associated preparatory works qualify for authors' rights protection in France as in other European Union jurisdictions. Databases are protected by a related sui generis right.

The term "author" is used to designate the original creator(s) of any type of protected work, e.g., the artist, photographer, director, architect, etc. Where the author cannot be identified, e.g., for anonymous works and collective works, the authors' rights is exercised by the original publisher.

A collective work is a work created at the initiative of a natural or legal person who edits it, publishes it and discloses it under his direction and name and in which the personal contributions of the various authors who participated in its production are merged in the overall work for which they were conceived, without it being possible to attribute to each author a separate right in the work as created. A collective work is the property, unless proved otherwise, of the natural or legal person under whose name it has been disclosed. The author's rights, vest in such person." The term of the exclusive right is 70 years from January 1 of the calendar year following that in which the work was published."

=== Freedom of panorama ===
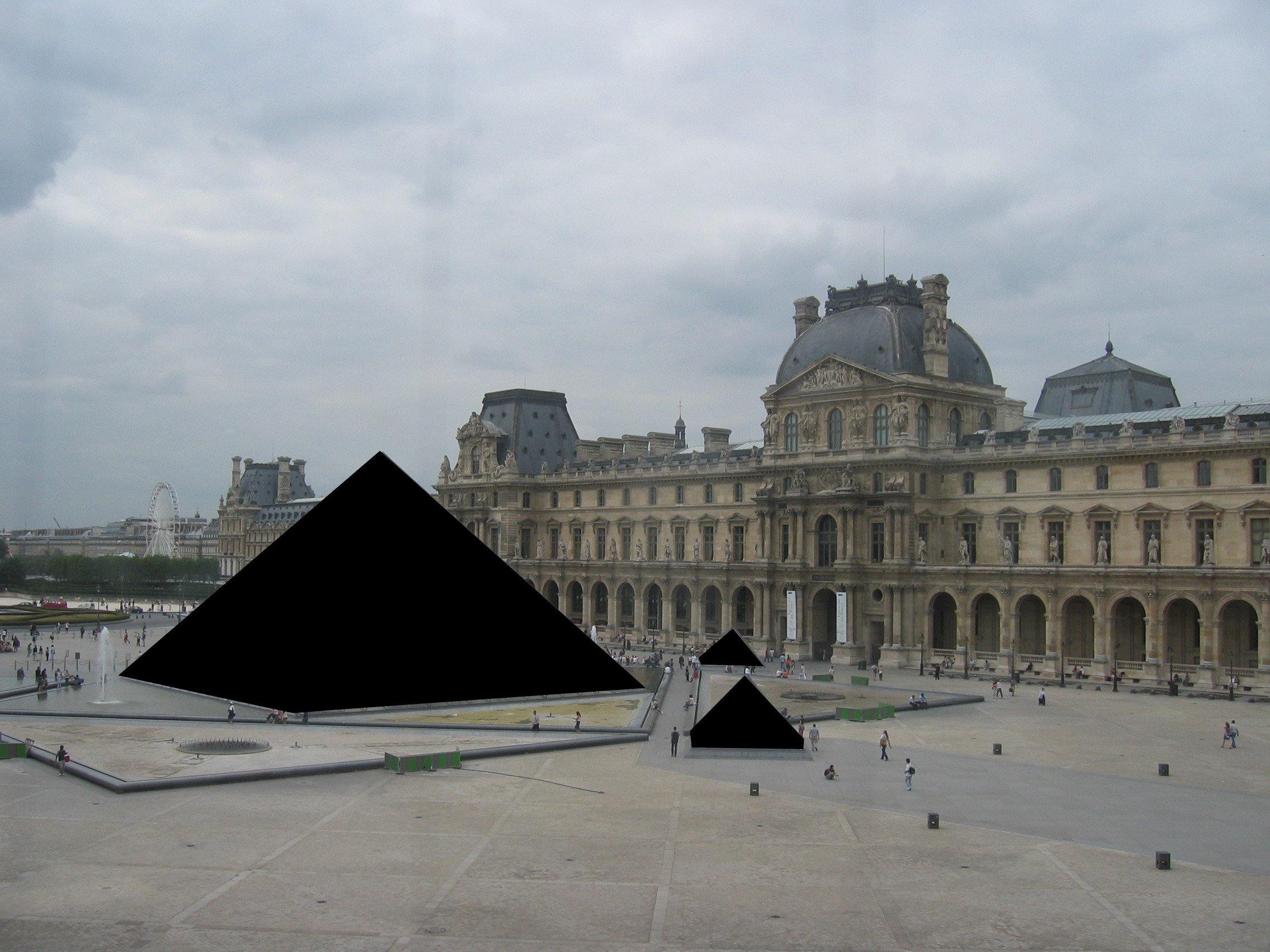
Due to the lack of complete freedom of panorama, this image depicting the Louvre Pyramid was censored out.

Since October 7, 2016, article L122-5 of the French Code of Intellectual Property provides for a limited freedom of panorama for works of architecture and sculpture. The code authorizes "reproductions and representations of works of architecture and sculpture, placed permanently in public places (voie publique), and created by natural persons, with the exception of any usage of a commercial character". French lawmakers and politicians were reluctant to introduce freedom of panorama in the past; former National Assembly member Patrick Bloche in 2011 called freedom of panorama an "amendement Wikipédia".

Works of architecture and sculptures have explicitly been protected under French law since 1902, when the former 1793 act was amended to extend the protection to "works of sculptures", simultaneously including works made by "architects" (buildings themselves as "works of sculptures" in the 1902 amendment).

For-profit reproductions of recent architectural works by photographers, filmmakers, graphic artists, or other third party users without permission from the architect or the entity whom the architect has assigned their patrimonial rights to are copyright infringement. Two separate court decisions in 1990 ruled that unauthorized postcards depicting Grande Arche and La Géode as principal subjects constitute infringements. Other monumental works protected by copyright include the Louvre Pyramid, the Opéra Bastille, and the new buildings of the Bibliothèque nationale de France.

French jurisprudence has never considered "accessory" reproduction as a copyright infringement even in for-profit reproductions, if the element reproduced is not the main subject being depicted. In a 2005 case concerning postcards of Lyon's Place des Terreaux, the Cour de cassation upheld the lower courts' decisions on the accessory inclusion of the plaza's modern artistic constructions on postcards, stating that the copyrighted works blended in with the public domain architecture of the plaza surroundings, and that "the work of art was of secondary importance to the subject", which is the plaza itself.

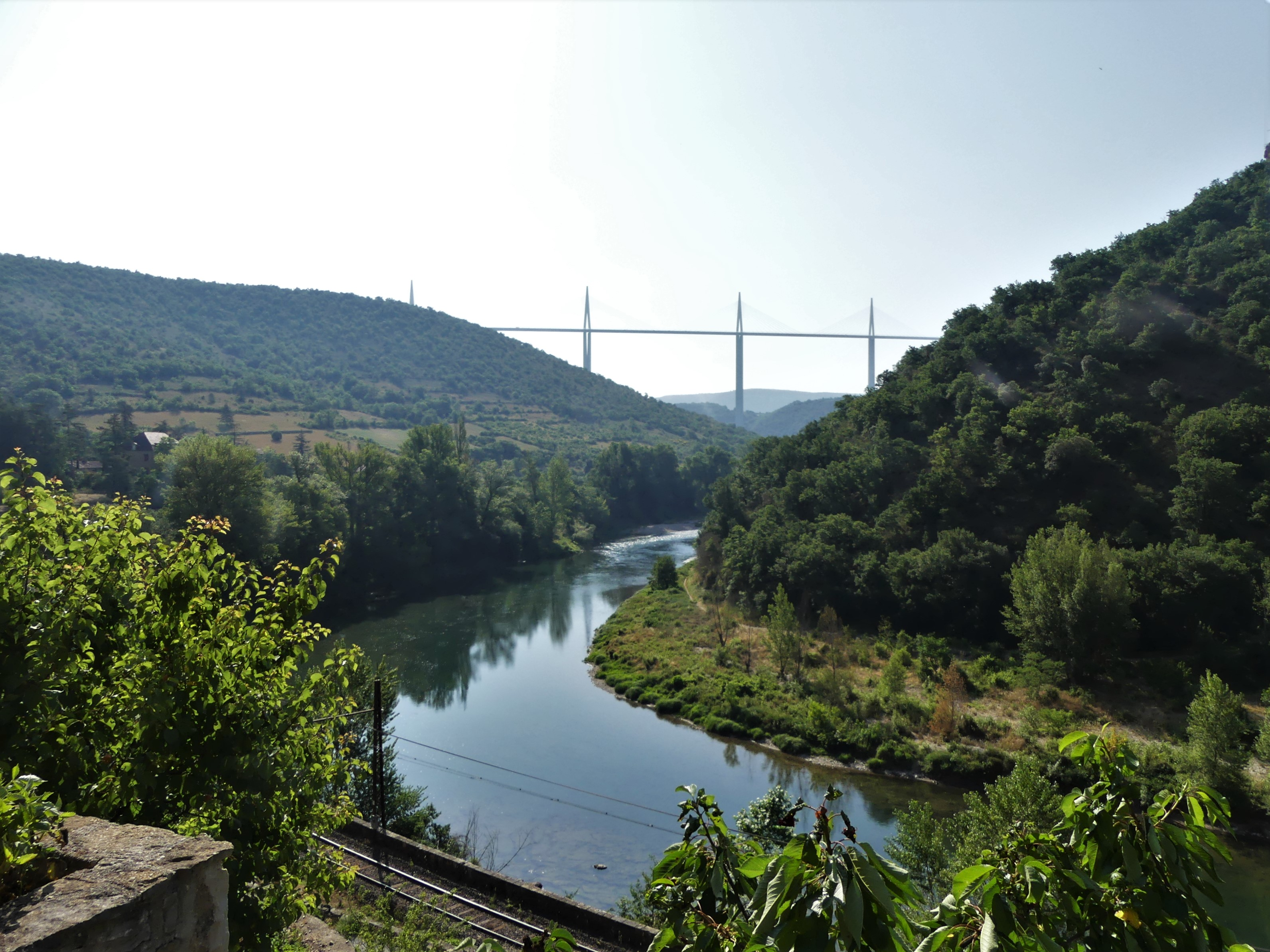
Photo of Tarn River in southern France, with the copyrighted Millau Viaduct in the background

CEVM (Compagnie Eiffage du Viaduc de Millau), the exclusive beneficiary of all property rights of Millau Viaduct on behalf of its architect Norman Foster, in their website explicitly requires that professional and/or commercial uses of images of the bridge are subject to "prior express permission of the CEVM". Additionally, CEVM has the sole right to distribute images of the viaduct in souvenir items such as postcards. However, private and/or non-commercial uses of images are tolerated by CEVM. Also exempted from obligatory permission and remuneration payment are "landscape images where the Viaduct appears in the background and is thus not the main focus of the image."

Shooting of a film in France involving uses of buildings still protected by architectural copyrights requires additional authorization from the architect or their representative or assignee, alongside a film permit. The length of time the building's appearance is used, the genre of the film or audio-visual work, the type of use, and the manner in which the building's appearance is used are all factors that are weighed in when calculating the amount to be paid in using the architectural work. Such permission is not required if the architecture "is not the main object" of the film.

In 2023, a French appeals court awarded €40,000 to a graffiti artist whose depiction of an Asian Marianne (in response to the violent arrest of Théo Luhaka) was used in LFI campaign videos in 2017 and 2020. A lower court had rejected the artist's claim to €900,000 in damages two years earlier. The appeals court, according to Agathe Zajdela, set a new precedence regarding graphic works like street art: that such works are not works of architecture or sculptures and therefore not under the scope of the non-commercial panorama exception, and that such works are not permanently placed on public roads because those are subject to natural hazards like inclement weather.

== Proprietary rights ==
The proprietary rights of the author allow him or her to exploit the work for financial gain, but also to authorize free use, and anything in between. The author has the right to authorize or prohibit the reproduction of the work (droit de reproduction) and to allow its public performance (droit de représentation); the author may also prevent the reproduction or public performance. The author may transfer his or her proprietary rights to a third party.

=== Duration of proprietary rights ===
The general rule is that the proprietary rights last for 70 years after the death of the author (Art. L123-1), or for 100 years after the author's death if the author is declared to have died on active service (mort pour la France) (Art. L123-10). The author is deemed to have died on 31 December of the year of death.

Before February 2007, the periods of World War I and World War II were not taken into account for the determination of the expiry date of proprietary rights, with peculiar ways of counting these (Arts. L123-8 & L123-9 -> see the French Wikipedia article Prorogations de guerre). These exceptions applied to works published before and during the wars, and must be added whatever the date of the author's death. These extensions were removed (for non-musical works) by the Court of Cassation in February 2007. They still have to be added to the 70 years delay for musical works, because of a 1985 law.

For collaborative works, the date of death of the last collaborator serves as the reference point for the 70 year post mortem auctoris period (art. L123-2). Audiovisual works are treated similarly, although the list of collaborators is defined by the law: scriptwriter, lyricist, composer, director.

Proprietary rights in pseudonymous, anonymous or collective works last for 70 years after the date of publication (art. L123-3).

For phonographic works, the proprietary rights last for 50 years after the date of recording.

Posthumous works (works published after the death of the author) are protected for 25 years from the year of publication.

=== Authors' rights management societies ===
As in other countries, there are a number of societies which collectively manage the licensing of different types of work and the collection of royalties on behalf of authors' rights holders. These societies typically operate as associations, and are regulated by the Code de la propriété intellectuelle (arts. L321-1 to L321-13) and the Ministry of Culture. The most important are:

- Centre Français d'Exploitation du droit de copie (CFC)
- Sacem
- ADAGP
- SACD

== Moral rights ==
French authors' rights law treats a protected work as an extension of the personality of the author which is protected by a certain number of moral rights. In general, the author has the right to "the respect of his name, of his status as author, and of his work" (Art. L121-1). The following rights are usually recognised:

- right of publication (droit de divulgation): the author is the sole judge as to when the work may be first made available to the public (Art. L121-2).
- right of attribution (droit de paternité): the author has the right to insist that his name and his authorship are clearly stated.
- right to the respect of the work's integrity (droit au respect de l'intégrité de l'oeuvre): the author can prevent any modification to the work.
- right of withdrawal (droit de retrait et de repentir): the author can prevent further reproduction, distribution or representation in return for compensation paid to the distributor of the work for the damage done to him (Art. L121-4).
- right to protection of honour and reputation (droit à s'opposer à toute atteinte préjudiciable à l'honneur et à la réputation).

The moral rights of the author may conflict with the property rights of the owner of the work, for example an architect who tries to prevent modifications to a building he designed. Such conflicts are resolved on a case by case basis, and recent jurisprudence has led to a weakening of certain moral rights, notably the right to the respect of the work.

The moral rights are inalienable, perpetual and inviolable. They pass to the author's heirs or executor on the author's death, but may not be otherwise transferred or sold by the author or legal successors. Any agreement to waive an author's moral rights is invalid, although the author cannot be forced to protect moral rights to the work, and always has the option to refrain from exercising them.

=== The public domain under French authors' rights law ===
A work enters the public domain (domaine public) once the proprietary rights over it have expired. It may then be used without charge, so long as the moral rights of the author are respected. Notably, the name of the author and the original title of the work must be cited.

== Exceptions ==
Art. L122-5 defines the exceptions to French authors' rights law, which are relatively restricted.

Once a work has been published, the author cannot prevent:

1. Private family performances.
2. Copies for the private and personal use of the copier. This provision does not apply to works of art, computer programs (where a single safeguard copy is allowed, Art. L122-6-1-II) and databases.
3. In cases where the name of the author and the source are clearly indicated,

a) Analyses and short citations justified by the critical, polemical, scientific or pedagogical nature of the work.
b) Press reviews.
c) Diffusion of public speeches as current news.
d) Reproductions of works of art in catalogues for auctions in France (subject to regulatory restrictions).

4. Parody, pastiche and caricature, "taking into account the usage of the genre".
5. Acts necessary to access a database within the limits of the agreed use.

There is no specific provision for government works or laws: the authors' rights is normally held by the relevant public body.

== Criminal sanctions ==
Contrary to the position in most Common Law jurisdictions, the breach of proprietary rights is a criminal offense in France: contrefaçon (Arts. L335-2 to L335-4). This attracts a fine of up to 300,000 Euros (approx. US$391,850, or £250,300 as of January 2012) and a term of up to three (3) years imprisonment. These penalties are increased to a fine of up to €500,000 and a term of up to five (5) years imprisonment if the offense is committed in an organised group (bande organisée). There is no distinction between the breach of French authors' rights and the breach of foreign authors' rights or copyright, though the breach must occur in the French territory to be punishable. The import of infringing copies into France, and the distribution of such copies, are punished under the same provisions and are subject to the same penalties.

== Relation to international authors' rights and copyright law ==
Under Art. 55 of the Constitution of 1958, a ratified treaty is superior to French domestic law. Hence the conflict of laws provisions of the Berne Convention will be used in determining the applicability of the French Code de la propriété intellectuelle.

== Difference between copyright and droit d'auteur ==
The droit d'auteur or authors' rights, in for instance France, Belgium, The Netherlands, Italy, Romania or Germany, grant (subject to some exceptions) the benefice of the right to natural persons (the author and heirs) and denies it to legal persons (except for collective works, and for software), whereas "droits voisins" or neighbouring rights, grant rights to the editor or the producer. Both authors' rights and neighbouring rights are copyrights in the sense of English or U.S. law.

Authors' rights requires a material fixation of the work, as for example a speech or a choreography work, although it is an intellectual work (an œuvre de l'esprit), they will not be protected if they are not embodied in a material support. Such requirement does not exist under the droit d'auteur. Thus an improvised live performance would still benefit from the protection of "droit d'auteur".

=== Moral rights ===
The classical difference between the two systems is the recognition of moral rights in the droit d'auteur whereas such rights did not initially exist in copyright. Hence, in civil law, the author is granted a moral right which sees the expression of the personality of the author in the work. In practice, the author will have a right to disclosure, a paternity right, a guarantee that the integrity of his work and his wishes are respected as well as a right of withdrawal (i.e., an author has the right to request his work to be withdrawn from circulation in exchange for compensation from those persons involved in its distribution who would moreover enjoy the right of priority in the event of the said work being redistributed). This right is attached to the author; it is inalienable and transmissible at the death of the author.

Historically, such rights do not exist in copyright, as it has been for decades an economic model, granting solely proprietary rights to authors. However, several countries have harmonized their legislation since the ratification of the Berne Convention. However, the United States of America still refuse to apply the moral rights recognized by this convention.

Nonetheless, In the United States of America, moral rights are explicitly recognized for works of visual art. Indeed, the Visual Artists Rights Act of 1990 (VARA) recognizes moral rights but applies it only to works of visual art.

=== Difference between copyright and droit d'auteur for audiovisual and cinematographic works ===
As regards the management of patrimonial rights, the difference between copyright and droit d'auteur is not so clear as in both system the producer controls the exploiting of the work. It can be stated that the droit d'auteur favours the author while copyright favours the right to copy (exploitation right) linked to the work itself.

==== Authorship ====
Under French law, the audiovisual work is considered as a collaborative work, that is, a work that has been created by multiple authors. The authorship is granted to natural persons (co-author) that have created the relevant work: scriptwriter, author of the musical composition etc. (L.113.7). In United States of America, audiovisual works are considered as "works made for hire" (works produced in relation with a contract for hire or service). The author of a work (either a natural or legal person) is the producer.

==== Term of protection of a work ====
In France, a work is protected until 70 years after the death of the last surviving co-author. The music to The Internationale did remain under authors' rights in France (but not in the USA) until 2014.

==== Applicable law for scriptwriters and directors ====
French law recognizes two types of droit d'auteur: moral rights and proprietary rights. French law governs the relation between authors and producers; such relations shall be formalized in a contract according to which the author assigns his proprietary rights to the producer.

In the United States of America, labor law governs the relations between "creators" and production companies. Scriptwriters and directors are consequently the employees of the producer. As such, they can be fired and replaced at any moment, and their names will appear in the credits only if their work fulfills the necessary conditions for the attributions of "credits" as provisioned under the MBA (Minimum Basic Agreement).

American Law does not always grant moral rights to creators. Some rights related to moral and proprietary rights are negotiated.

=== Towards harmonization ===
The French and common-law systems have converged somewhat over time. Analogues to moral rights are increasingly recognized in U.S. courts, and eleven U.S. states recognize explicitly moral rights in law. The states of California and New York guarantee the integrity of the author's work, and the Visual Artists Rights Act, enacted October 27, 1990, incorporates moral rights of artists in a federal law. In the United Kingdom, moral rights have been incorporated in copyright law (authors' rights, Designs and Patents Act 1988).

For a historical and comparative overview of moral rights law in the United States of America, see Thomas F. Cotter (1997) "Pragmatism, Economics, and the Droit Moral", 76 North Carolina Law Review 1 .

The current tendency is that the droit d'auteur tends to also guarantee an economic protection while copyright increasingly guarantee moral rights.

== See also ==
- Copyright law of the European Union (in French: protection du droit d'auteur et de certains droits voisins)
- December 22, 2005 last-minute amendments legalizing peer-to-peer exchanges in the frame of the DADVSI Act implementing the 2001 Information Society Directive
- French Intellectual Property Code

== Literature ==
- Anne Latournerie, Petite histoire des batailles du droit d’auteur, Multitudes n°5, May 2001 (in French)
