= Monsanto Technology LLC v Cefetra BV and Others =

- European Court of Justice

Decided 6 July 2010 {{{DecideYear}}}
- Full case name: Monsanto Technology LLC v Cefetra BV, Cefetra Feed Service BV, Cefetra Futures BV, Alfred C. Toepfer International GmbH, Intervener in support of the defendant: Argentine State
- Case: C-428/08
- CelexID: 62008J0428
- Chamber: Grand Chamber
- Nationality of parties: Netherlands
- Procedural history: Preliminary Ruling

Court composition
- President; V. Skouris
- Judge Rapporteur; L. Bay Larsen
- Advocate General; P. Mengozzi

Legislation affecting
- Article 9 of Directive 98/44/EC

Keywords
- Biotechnology, Patents, European Union, Biotechnology Directive, genetics

Monsanto Technology LLC v Cefetra BV and Others (2010) was a preliminary ruling by the European Court of Justice (ECJ) regarding the legal protection of biotechnological inventions. The case dealt with the interpretation of Article 9 of Directive 98/44/EC on the legal protection of biotechnological inventions, and it was the first ECJ interpretation of the 1998 directive.

== Facts ==
Monsanto holds a European patent, EP 0 546 090, for a variety of soybean containing genes inserted into the plants DNA. The inserted genes make the plant resistant to a particular type of herbicide known as Roundup. The resulting soybean plant is known as Roundup Ready (RR). The RR soybean plant remains unharmed by the application of herbicide while surrounding weeds die. The RR soybean plant is cultivated on a large scale in Argentina where there is no patent protection for the Monsanto invention at [18].

In July 2003 soy meal from Argentina was shipped to Amsterdam and the shipments were detained by customs. Monsanto tested the samples and determined that the soy meal originated from RR soybeans. Monsanto then applied for injunctions against the importers of the soy meal, Cefetra and Toepfer and the shipping company Vopak. The Dutch court then considered the issues under their local patent law and EU patent law. Acknowledging that Monsanto had established the presence of their patented genetic material in the soy meal, the court must decide if the presence alone of such genetic material is sufficient for infringement of Monsanto's patent at [25] and [26].

The courts analysis is primarily driven by the specific language regarding whether the genetic material is present, and if it performs its function therein. The court concludes that the genetic material present in the soy meal is dead material, and no longer performs its function. Therefore, in the courts interpretation Monsanto's patent is not infringed. Recognizing that there is profit being had by the soy producers in Argentina, without any reciprocal compensation to the patent holders, the court referred the following question to the ECJ:

1. Must Article 9 of Directive 98/44/EC be interpreted such that patent protection is provided when a product (genetic material) forms part of a material imported into the EU, but no longer performs its function at the time of the alleged infringement (yet could still possibly perform its function if inserted into a living organism)?
2. Proceeding on the basis that the genetic material claimed by Monsanto's patent is present in the soy meal imported by Cefetra and Toepfer, and it is incorporated for the purpose of Article 9 of the directive and it does not perform its function therein: does the protection offered under Article 9 preclude the national patent legislation from offering absolute protection to the product, regardless of whether it performs its function, and must Article 9 protection therefore be deemed exhaustive in the situation where the product consists of genetic information and is incorporated in material which contains the genetic information?
3. Does it make any difference, for the purpose of answering the previous question, that the patent was applied for and granted prior to the adoption of the directive and absolute patent protection was granted under national patent legislation prior to the adoption of the directive?
4. Is it possible, in answering the previous questions, to take into consideration the TRIPS Agreement, in particular Articles 27 and 30 thereof?

== Judgment ==
The first question

The ECJ addressed the first question by stating, "It follows from the foregoing that the protection provided for in Article 9 of the Directive is not available when the genetic information has ceased to perform the function it performed in the initial material from which the material in question is derived." at [38] at p. 540

The second question

In response to question two the ECJ states, "Accordingly, in so far as the Directive does not accord protection to a patented DNA sequence which is not able to perform its function, the provision interpreted precludes the national legislature from granting absolute protection to a patented DNA sequence as such, regardless of whether it performs its function in the material containing it. The answer to the second question is therefore that Article 9 of the Directive effects an exhaustive harmonisation of the protection it confers, with the result that it precludes the national patent legislation from offering absolute protection to the patented product as such, regardless of whether it performs its function in the material containing it." at [62-63]

The third question

The ECJ responds to question three as follows, "The answer to the third question is therefore that Article 9 of the Directive precludes the holder of a patent issued prior to the adoption of that directive from relying on the absolute protection for the patented product accorded to it under the national legislation then applicable." at [69]

The fourth question

In response to question four the ECJ states, "The answer to the fourth question is therefore that Articles 27 and 30 of the TRIPS Agreement do not affect the interpretation given of Article 9 of the Directive." at [77]

== See also ==
- The Agreement on Trade Related Aspects of Intellectual Property Rights (TRIPS Agreement)
- Patent Act 1995 (Netherlands)
