= Bürgerspital zum Heiligen Geist =

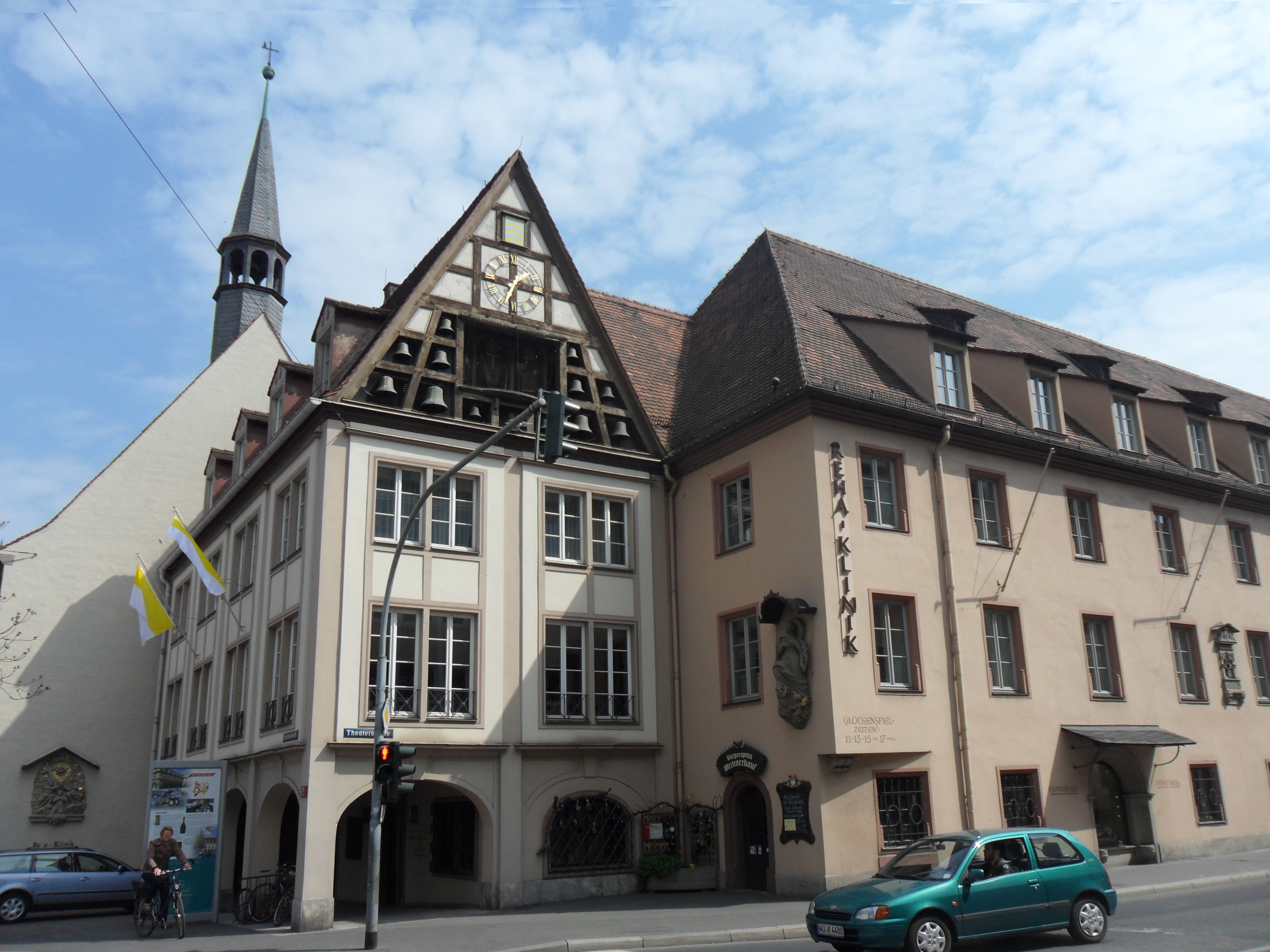
Burger Hospital and wine shop

The Bürgerspital zum Heiligen Geist (Citizens' Hospital of the Holy Spirit) is a Stiftung (foundation) in Würzburg. It operates several senior citizens' homes and a geriatric rehabilitation clinic. The economic foundation of the Stiftung is based on its extensive properties and winery, which today is one of the oldest and largest German vineyards. A wine tavern and restaurant in Würzburg's old town, which offers wines from the Bürgerspital and Franconian regions, is also part of the establishment.

== History ==
Johannes von Steren (about 1270-1329), a Würzburg patrician of ministerial origin, and his wife Mergardis transferred their property at Semmelstraße 2 to the town to take care of poor and sick people around 1316, thereby establishing the "Neues Spital" "Citizens' Hospital of the Holy Spirit". Von Steren decreed that the foundation in the royal residence in Würzburg should not be passed on by the influential church, but by the mayor, a decision which "placed the family somewhat at a standstill" and sign of the then-emerging civil society.

In a document dated June 23, 1319, Prince-Archbishop Gottfried III of Hohenlohe authorized the partial exhortation of the "Neue Spital" and its administration by three civic carers. In 1320/1321 the papal confirmation of the establishment of the foundation by Pope John XXII took place.

There were later additional contributions by Würzburg citizens, the largest by the brothers Teufel in the year 1340. The representation of the Holy Spirit as a pigeon on the coat of arms, and the obligation to serve the Holy Spirit and the sick, goes back to the Order of the Brothers of the Order of the Holy Spirit in Rome. Wealthy citizens could also enjoy a safe retirement at the hospital.

The building complex consists of a hospital building, an industrial estate, and a church, which surround a courtyard. The courtyard with its arcades was built according to plans by Würzburg master builder Andreas Müller, a companion of Balthasar Neumann. In the bomb attack on Würzburg on March 16, 1945, the hospital buildings burned down to the ground walls. The Gothic church is the only building that remains from the founding era. Only the outer walls remained from the so-called "red building" from the year 1717/18.

The foundation is financed by the operations of its properties. These properties include the Weingut Bürgerspital, commercial real estate, 650 building leaseholds, and more than 200 apartments.
