= Enforcement Directive =

Directive 2004/48/EC
- European Union directive
- Title: Directive on the enforcement of intellectual property rights
- Made by: European Parliament & Council
- Made under: Art. 95
- Journal reference: L157, 2004-04-30, pp. 32 – 36; L195, 2004-06-02, pp. 16 – 25

History
- Date made: 2004-04-29
- Entry into force: 2004-05-20
- Implementation date: 2006-04-29

Preparative texts
- EESC opinion: C32, 2004-02-05, p. 15
- Reports

Other legislation
- Replaces: —
- Amends: —
- Amended by: —
- Replaced by: —

Directive 2004/48/EC of the European Parliament and of the Council of 29 April 2004 on the enforcement of intellectual property rights (also known as "(IPR) Enforcement Directive" or "IPRED") is a European Union directive in the field of intellectual property law, made under the Single Market provisions of the Treaty of Rome. The directive covers civil remedies only—not criminal ones.

Under Article 3(1), Member States can be censured in the European Court of Justice if their civil procedures on the infringement of intellectual property rights are "unnecessarily complicated or costly, or entail unreasonable time-limits or unwarranted delays". Otherwise the Directive harmonises the rules on standing, evidence, interlocutory measures, seizure and injunctions, damages and costs and judicial publication.

== Subject-matter and scope ==
The Directive requires all Member States to apply effective, dissuasive and proportionate remedies and penalties against those engaged in counterfeiting and piracy. Thus, the purpose of the instrument is to regulate enforcement of intellectual property rights, not the rights themselves. The Directive leaves unaffected the substantive provisions on intellectual property, international obligations of the Member States and national provisions relating to criminal procedure and criminal enforcement.

The subject-matter of the Directive is defined in Article 1. It applies to enforcement of intellectual property rights which include industrial property rights. The scope of the Directive is defined in Article 2. It applies to all infringements of IP rights in Community and national law, without precluding more stringent protection that the Community or national law may otherwise grant.

The general obligation in the Directive is to provide for remedies necessary to enforce intellectual property rights. These shall be "fair and equitable" and must not be "complicated or costly, or entail unreasonable time-limits or unwarranted delays". They must furthermore be effective, proportionate and dissuasive and must not act as barriers to trade.

The persons who are entitled to apply for the remedies are primarily the holder of intellectual property right, but also any person authorised to use it, such as licencees and intellectual property rights. Collective rights management and professional defence bodies may also have the right under certain circumstances.

== Evidence ==
Section 2 of the Directive deals with the evidence. Article 6 gives the power to the interested party to apply for evidence regarding an infringement that lies in the hands of the other party to be presented. The only requirement is for that party to present "reasonably available evidence sufficient to support its claim" to courts. In case of an infringement on a commercial scale, Member States must also take steps to ensure that "banking, financial or commercial documents" of the opposing party are presented. In both cases confidential information shall be protected.

Measures for preserving evidence are available even before the proceedings commence. Article 7 provides that such measures may be granted under the same conditions as under Article 6 and include provisional measures such as "the detailed description, with or without the taking of samples, or the physical seizure" not only of the infringing goods (such as hard drives) but also materials used in the production and distribution (e.g., French saisie-contrefaçon). Such measures may be taken "without the other party having been heard, in particular where any delay is likely to cause irreparable harm to the rights holder or where there is a demonstrable risk of evidence being destroyed". These are interlocutory, ex parte and in personam orders known in the English and Irish jurisdictions as Anton Piller orders and in France as "saisie-contrefaçons".

== Provisional and precautionary measures ==
At the request of an applicant, the judicial authorities may issue an interlocutory injunction to prevent an "imminent infringement" of intellectual property rights or to prevent a continuing infringement. In the latter case, the order may be followed with a recurring penalty payment or lodging of a guarantee intended to compensate the rights holder (paragraph a). An injunction can also be issued, under the same conditions, against an intermediary, but these are covered in Article 8(2) of the Information Society Directive and are, in principle, subject to national law.

Apart from the ordinary injunctions of the previous paragraph there also exist the so-called Mareva injunctions in Article 9(2). In common law, these are ex parte and in personam orders used to freeze assets (including bank accounts) to prevent abuses of process. They can be issued as worldwide injunctions, preventing worldwide dispersal. In that case, their effectiveness depends on their in personam character, as a party who is found to be guilty of disposing of assets will be held to be in contempt of court. Like Anton Piller orders, their use is confined mostly to the UK.

Article 9(2) provides that, in the case of an infringement on a commercial scale, judicial authorities may order a precautionary seizure of "movable and immovable property" which includes freezing the bank accounts and other assets. This may only be done if the applicant demonstrates that it is likely that recovery of damages will be endangered. Further to that, documents relating to banking and other financial transaction may be communicated.

== Implementation ==
The provisions of the Directive were due to be implemented in all member states of the European Union by 29 April 2006. However, a number of states have not completed the necessary steps.

The Directive has been implemented into United Kingdom law by the Intellectual Property (Enforcement, etc.) Regulations 2006. The Directive has been implemented into Dutch law, and came into force on 1 May 2007. It has been implemented in France on 27 June 2008. The Swedish parliament voted to implement the Directive on 26 February 2009, and it went into force on 1 April 2009.

== Criticism ==
The Directive has been widely criticised for what opponents called a draconian approach similar to the United States' Digital Millennium Copyright Act (DMCA). In fact, the criticism was so strong—especially from the telecommunications industry and parts of computer industry—that the original draft was substantially modified. A number of problems still remain in the final document, according to the international civil liberties organisation IP Justice.

- Cambridge University's Ross Anderson
- ZDNet News
- BBC Analysis
- Indymedia on RFID tags

== Examples of cases wherein the provisions of the Directive have been applied ==
In the 2007 Princo Corporation, Ltd v Koninklijke Philips Electronics case before the Court of Genoa, Italy, the Dutch company Philips, owner of patents on CD-R technology, requested and obtained an order of precautionary seizure over all Princo's movable and immovable property, including its bank accounts, with a view to ensuring the recovery of damages to be awarded at the end of the liability proceedings.

A judgement in the case of Tommy Hilfiger Licensing LLC and others v Delta Center A. S. (2016) extends the European Court of Justice's decision in the L’Oréal v eBay 2011 case (relating to online marketplaces). The Tommy Hilfiger case held that under the third sentence of Article 11 of the Directive, operators of physical marketplaces, in this case Prague Market Halls, who sublet pitches to market-traders, may be forced to stop concluding contracts with market-traders selling counterfeit goods within their facilities, in order to prevent infringements of intellectual property rights by the market-traders.

== See also ==
- Customs Regulation 3295/94
- Directive on criminal measures aimed at ensuring the enforcement of intellectual property rights (defunct proposal)
- Copyright law of the European Union
- Community Trade Mark
- European Union patent law
- Copyright infringement
- IPredator
