= Patent law of the European Union =

European Union patent law is a subset of European patent law. It also serves as the superset of the patent laws of the individual member states of the European Union (EU). The most recent (proposed) addition to the range of measures currently in place is the Directive on criminal measures aimed at ensuring the enforcement of intellectual property rights. The most recent directive relating specifically to patents is Directive on the patentability of biotechnological inventions. Patents are probably the least harmonised area of intellectual property laws of the European Union insofar as harmonisation through EU Directives and Regulations is concerned. However, patentability criteria have been substantially harmonized by the European Patent Convention.

"The most noticeable characteristic of the present state of the patent law in the EU is its dualism, i.e. the coexistence of two different ways for obtaining patents with the same effects, namely limited to the territory of the Member State for which they are granted. (...) a Community patent, i.e. a patent which would cover the entire territory of the EU, have the same effects throughout the EU, which could be revoked centrally, etc., is not available because a great number of EU Member States have not ratified the 1989 Agreement Relating to Community Patents."

"The continuing decentralized administration of European patents in as many as 17 States, in spite of the Single Market and the Maastricht Treaties, is an anachronism for which applicants have to pay dearly. Enforcement is another area where European patent holders must still live with disadvantages unknown to their US and Japanese competitors in their own countries.”

== See also ==
=== Regulations ===
- Regulation concerning the creation of a supplementary protection certificate for medicinal products (1768/92, 18 June 1992)
- Regulation concerning the creation of a supplementary protection certificate for plant protection products (1610/96, 23 July 1996)
- Regulation concerning medicinal products for paediatric use (1901/2006, 12 December 2006)
- Regulation implementing enhanced co-operation in the area of creation of unitary patent protection (1257/2012, 17 December 2012)

=== Directives ===
- Directive on the enforcement of intellectual property rights (2004/48/EC, 29 April 2004)
- Directive on the patentability of biotechnological inventions (98/44/EC, 6 July 1998)
- Directive on criminal measures aimed at ensuring the enforcement of intellectual property rights (proposed)
- Directive on the patentability of computer-implemented inventions (proposed, then rejected)

=== Other ===
- IPR-Helpdesk, EU Commission project
- Treaty on the Functioning of the European Union (TFEU), Article 118 s:Consolidated version of the Treaty on the Functioning of the European Union/Title VII: Common Rules on Competition, Taxation and Approximation of Laws#Article 118

== References and further reading ==
- Braendli, The Future of the European Patent System, 26 IIC 813-829 (1995)
- Bossung, The Return of European Patent Law to the European Union, 27 IIC 287-315 (1996)
- Straus, J., The Present State of the Patent System in the European Union as Compared with the Situation in the United States of America and Japan, European Commission, Luxembourg, 1997. ISBN 92-826-9555-7
