= Anton Piller order =

Court order for search and seizure of evidence

In English and English-derived legal systems, an Anton Piller order (frequently misspelled Anton Pillar order) is a court order that provides the right to search premises and seize evidence without prior warning. This is intended to prevent the destruction of relevant evidence, particularly in cases of alleged trademark, copyright or patent infringements.

== Overview ==
The order is named after the 1975 English case of Anton Piller KG v Manufacturing Processes Limited, dealing with the theft of trade secrets, although the first reported such order was granted by Templeman J earlier that year. They are now formally known as search orders in England and Wales, New Zealand, Australia, and India.

In Anton Piller, Lord Denning described the nature of the relief:

Let me say at once that no court in this land has any power to issue a search warrant to enter a man's house so as to see if there are papers or documents there which are of an incriminating nature, whether libels or infringements of copyright or anything else of the kind. No constable or bailiff can knock at the door and demand entry so as to inspect papers or documents. The householder can shut the door in his face and say, "Get out." That was established in the leading case of Entick v. Carrington. None of us would wish to whittle down that principle in the slightest. But the order sought in this case is not a search warrant. It does not authorise the plaintiffs' solicitors or anyone else to enter the defendant's premises against his will. It does not authorise the breaking down of any doors, nor the slipping in by a back door, nor getting in by an open door or window. It only authorises entry and inspection by the permission of the defendants. The plaintiff must get the defendant's permission. But it does do this: It brings pressure on the defendants to give permission. It does more. It actually orders him to give permission—with, I suppose, the result that if he does not give permission, he is guilty of contempt of court.

Because such an order does not give the accused party the ability to defend themselves, Anton Piller orders are only issued exceptionally and according to the three-step test set out by Ormrod LJ in Anton Piller:

1. There is an extremely strong prima facie case against the respondent.
2. The damage, potential or actual, must be very serious for the applicant.
3. There must be clear evidence that the respondents have in their possession relevant documents or things and that there is a real possibility that they may destroy such material before an inter partes application can be made.

In England, it has been reported that approximately 500 Anton Piller orders were granted per year between 1975 and 1980. During the 1990s, this rate had dropped tenfold. Although the name persists in normal usage, the common law application of this order has been largely superseded by a statutory search order under the Civil Procedure Act 1997. A search order under this act "does not affect any right of a person to refuse to do anything on the ground that to do so might tend to expose him or his spouse to proceedings for an offence or for the recovery of a penalty".

Hugh Laddie is generally credited with the "invention" of the Anton Piller order. An obituary in The Daily Telegraph stated that he later described the Anton Piller order "as a Frankenstein's monster that went far beyond his original design brief".

In some jurisdictions (for example, Hong Kong and South Africa) where there is no statutory search order, the Anton Piller order is still often used. In South Africa, for example, in Mathias International Ltd v Baillache, the applicants instituted motion proceedings in which they claimed (i) an Anton Piller order and (ii) interdictory relief directed at prohibiting unlawful competition by the first and second respondents using the applicants' "confidential information".

In Lock International plc v Beswick, Anton Piller orders were described as "intrusive".

== Outside England ==
Anton Piller orders also constitute a common ex parte procedure in intellectual property related cases in some other countries, such as Canada, France, and Italy.

=== France and Belgium ===
Anton Piller orders are known in France and Belgium as saisie-contrefaçon (literally, "infringement seizure") orders—in Belgium also as saisie-description (literally, "descriptive seizure") orders. The court order may only allow the description of the alleged counterfeited goods and processes, with the aim of obtaining evidence of infringement, or may additionally allow real seizure to take place in addition to the description measures. Such a seizure is enforced by a bailiff, usually accompanied by at least one expert. It can take place on the premises of the alleged infringer, but also at a trade fair for instance. Art. L. 615-5. of the French Intellectual Property Code reads as follows (excerpt only):

The owner of a patent application or the owner of a utility certificate application or the owner of a patent or of a utility certificate shall have the possibility of furnishing proof by any means whatsoever of the infringement of which he claims to be a victim.

He shall further be entitled, on an order given by the President of the First Instance Court of the place of the presumed infringement, to direct any bailiffs, accompanied by experts of his own choice, to proceed with a detailed description, with or without effective seizure, of the allegedly infringing articles or processes. Such order shall be provisionally enforced. It may be subjected to a security on the part of the plaintiff. In that same order, the President of the Court may authorise the bailiff to carry out any enquiry required to ascertain the origin, nature and scope of the infringement. ... (emphasis added)

=== European Union ===
Similar provisions are now required in the rest of Europe, under Article 7 of the European Union Directive on the enforcement of intellectual property rights, approved in April 2004.

=== Australia ===
Anton Piller orders are also used in Australia and are available on grounds similar to that of England. Each superior court jurisdiction provides rules and forms for the manner in which Anton Piller orders are available.

In technical modern terminology, Anton Piller orders are referred to as "search orders", but "Anton Piller order" remains dominant in everyday use, including in universities.

Of great importance is the onus upon an applicant to establish proper grounds for obtaining such an order. This is due to the largely ex parte nature of the application. As such, an applicant must demonstrate not only that it has reasonable grounds for success in its case but must put the likely counter arguments of a respondent if that respondent were present to oppose the order being granted. This is a heavy burden faced by an applicant: its avoidance is not taken lightly by the courts and can result in penalties for its breach (see Columbia Picture Industries v Robinson [1987] Ch 38).

Also of great importance is the likely effect of a search upon occupants of the premises, given in particular that the intrusion would otherwise be a trespass: Adani Mining Pty Ltd v Pennings (2020).

=== Canada ===
==== Common-law jurisdictions ====
The Supreme Court of Canada, in Celanese Canada Inc. v. Murray Demolition Corp. established guidelines for Anton Piller orders. The orders are meant to protect evidence from being destroyed, not to gain litigious advantage, and should only be issued if:

- The plaintiff has demonstrated a strong prima facie case.
- The damage to the plaintiff of the respondent's alleged misconduct, potential or actual, must be very serious.
- There must be convincing evidence that the defendant has in its possession incriminating documents or things.
- It must be shown that there is a real possibility that the defendant may destroy such material before the discovery process can do its work.

The Court laid out basic protection for the rights of parties involved. The protections in place are meant to protect solicitor-client privilege by preventing privileged documents from being disclosed. The search must be conducted according to the following guidelines:

- During normal business hours.
- Defendant or responsible employee of the defendant should be present.
- The persons who may conduct the search should be specified and limited in number.
- A copy of the claim should be served on the defendant.
- The defendants have a right to contact their lawyer within a reasonable amount of time.
- A detailed list of evidence should be made.
- Where possible, documents seized should be placed in custody of the supervising lawyer and defence should have the opportunity to review them.
- Contested evidence should be kept in the supervising lawyer's custody.

The supervising lawyer, referred to as an independent supervising solicitor (ISS), should:

1. act as a neutral officer of the court,
2. explain the court's order to the defendant,
3. supervise the search for and seizure of evidence from the defendant,
4. objectively report to the Court,
5. aid the Court and counsel for all parties in technical matters.

In addition, following the search:

- The order should make clear the responsibilities of the supervising solicitor continue beyond the search itself.
- The supervising solicitor should file a report of the search within a time limit describing the execution including who was present and what was seized.
- The plaintiff may be required to file and serve a motion for review within a set time in case the defendant does not request such a review.

If counsel gains access to privileged documents as a result of an Anton Piller order, the court must ensure precautionary steps are taken to prevent any potential prejudice – including removal of counsel if no alternative is available.

==== Quebec (civil law jurisdiction) ====
The Quebec Court of Appeal has recognized Anton Piller orders as being valid in that province under its civil law.

=== Ireland ===
Anton Piller orders have been granted by the High Court in William A. Grogan (copyright owner of RAMDIS) v. Monaghan Electrical Ltd & Michael Traynor (1998) related to an unlicensed copy of the RAMDIS software system, Joblin-Purser v. Jackman and Microsoft v. Brightpoint, but the issue has not come before the Supreme Court and, owing to the civil nature of the order and the strong protection given to the family home in the constitution, it currently exists in something of a grey area.

=== New Zealand ===
The Anton Piller case is the basis for rule 33.3 of the High Court rules.

This rule requires that:

1. an applicant seeking the order has a strong prima facie case on an accrued case of action,
2. the potential or actual loss or damage to the applicant will be serious if the search order is not made,
3. there is sufficient evidence in relation to a respondent that:
  1. the respondent possesses relevant evidentiary material,
  2. there is a real possibility that the respondent might destroy such material or cause it to be unavailable for use in evidence in a proceeding or anticipated proceeding before the court.

=== Impoundment orders in the United States ===
Orders comparable to Anton Piller orders have long been available in the United States under section 503(a) of the Copyright Act (17 USC, § 503(a)), which provides for the impounding of allegedly infringing copies of works and equipment for making them.

In recent years, questions have been raised about the abusive use of these orders, and the doubtful constitutionality of the procedures used. More recent decisions in the field have tended to require that impoundment must be necessary, reasonable, and comport with the requirements of due process.

== Combination with Mareva injunction ==
An Anton Piller order is often combined with a Mareva injunction, enabling an applicant to have the respondent's assets frozen so they cannot be dissipated to frustrate the judgment. This can, however, be disastrous for a defendant as the cumulative effect of these orders can be to destroy the whole of a business' custom, by freezing most of its assets and revealing important information to its competitors.

== See also ==
- Injunction
- Norwich Pharmacal order
