= Norwich Pharmacal order =

UK court disclosure order

A Norwich Pharmacal order is a court order for the disclosure of documents or information that is available in the United Kingdom, Ireland, Australia, and Canada. It is granted against a third party which has been mixed up in wrongdoing, forcing the disclosure of documents or information. By identifying individuals the documents and information sought are disclosed in order to assist the applicant for such an order in bringing legal proceedings against individuals who are believed to have wronged the applicant.

A Norwich Pharmacal order was first granted in 1974 by the House of Lords in Norwich Pharmacal Co. v Customs and Excise Commissioners, a case concerning the alleged violation of a patent by unknown importers of the chemical subject to the patent. While first developed in relation to intellectual property, Norwich Pharmacal orders are now granted in relation to other torts, including defamation, and breach of contract, as well as alleged criminal offences. More recently Norwich Pharmacal orders are used against Internet hosting services and Internet service providers to identify users which have allegedly engaged in wrongdoing.

In 2011, it was proposed that Norwich Pharmacal orders should not be granted by the UK courts where disclosure of the material in question would cause damage to the public interest. This was implemented in the Justice and Security Act 2013.

== Principles of the Norwich Pharmacal jurisdiction ==
In Norwich Pharmacal Co. v Customs and Excise Commissioners, the House of Lords held that where a third party has information relating to unlawful conduct, a court could compel them to assist the person suffering damage by giving them that information. The judgment is based on the 19th century procedure known as the "bill of discovery" and the case was brought by Norwich Pharmacal Co., the owner of the patent for a chemical. Norwich knew that its patent was infringed, because the chemical was imported into the UK, but it was unable to identify the alleged wrongdoer. It brought proceedings against HM Customs and Excise to force the Commissioners to disclose the names of the importers, which were the "Intended Defendants".

Norwich Pharmacal orders are typically sought when legal proceedings for alleged wrongdoing cannot be brought because the identity of the wrongdoer is not known. Parties which believe they have been wronged will apply for a Norwich Pharmacal order to the court against third parties who can identify the wrongdoer, because they unwittingly facilitate the wrongdoing. In the judgment granting the first Norwich Pharmacal order Lord Reid summarised the principle of the Norwich Pharmacal jurisdiction as follows:

... that if through no fault of his own a person gets mixed up in the tortious acts of others so as to facilitate their wrongdoing he may incur no personal liability but he comes under a duty to assist the person who has been wronged by giving him full information and disclosing the identity of the wrongdoers.

An application for a Norwich Pharmacal order must be commenced against the facilitator by issuing a claim form. In the case of alleged tort an interim application must be made to a master in the Queen's Bench Division or the Chancery Division in the High Court of Justice. The Civil Procedure Rules (CPR) 31.17 outline the procedures of the Norwich Pharmacal jurisdiction in England and Wales. Norwich Pharmacal orders are not restricted to cases where such an order is a last resort – it is "intended to be a ... flexible remedy."

The nature of the relief has been summarised thus:

1. Norwich-type relief has been granted in varied situations:
  1. where the information sought is necessary to identify wrongdoers;
  2. to find and preserve evidence that may substantiate or support an action against either known or unknown wrongdoers, or even determine whether an action exists; and
  3. to trace and preserve assets.
2. The court will consider the following factors on an application for Norwich relief:
  1. Whether the applicant has provided evidence sufficient to raise a valid, bona fide or reasonable claim;
  2. Whether the applicant has established a relationship with the third party from whom the information is sought such that it establishes that the third party is somehow involved in the acts complained of;
  3. Whether the third party is the only practicable source of the information available;
  4. Whether the third party can be indemnified for costs to which the third party may be exposed because of the disclosure, some refer to the associated expenses of complying with the orders, while others speak of damages; and
  5. Whether the interests of justice favour the obtaining of the disclosure.

== Developments in case law ==
Year	Case	Description
1978	Loose v Williamson	In urgent cases, where delay could cause substantial and irreparable harm, an application for a Norwich Pharmacal order can be made without notice.
1980	SmithKline and French Laboratories Ltd v R.D. Harbottle (Mercantile) Ltd	Because the order is made against an innocent third party, the applicant should normally be required to pay the innocent third party's costs, which the applicant may later recover from the wrongdoer or Intended Defendants.
1981	British Steel Corp. v Granada Television	Norwich Pharmacal orders should only be granted where the applicant intends to seek redress by court proceedings or otherwise. Journalists can, following this ruling, be forced to disclose their news sources. The decision prompted the passage of the Contempt of Court Act 1981, which allows courts to refuse disclosure orders where it could not be established that disclosure is "necessary in the interest of justice or national security or for the prevention of disorder or crime". This has been used in subsequent applications for Norwich Pharmacal orders to afford general protection for a journalist's sources.
2001	Totalise v Motley Fool	Norwich Pharmacal orders are applicable to alleged torts such as libel and copyright infringement. In one of the first such orders against an online chat room operator, the investment advice company Motley Fool was compelled to identify a user who had posted allegedly libellous comments about the ISP Totalise. The case reaffirmed the principle established in SmithKline that the applicant pays the third party's costs, even where the third party actively contests the order, because it is for the applicant to prove to the court that he or she is entitled to the disclosure order. Legitimate reasons for contesting an application include: genuine doubt that the person seeking the disclosure order is entitled to it, the legal position regarding obligations not to disclose data (for example under the Data Protection Act 2018) is not clear, and that the disclosure of the information sought might infringe a legitimate interest of another.
2008	Smith v ADVFN plc	Applicants for a Norwich Pharmacal order need to provide the court with a coherent body of evidence which allows for an allegation of wrongdoing to be properly assessed. The Court of Appeal refused to grant a Norwich Pharmacal order against an Internet bulletin board which would have forced the identification of individuals who were alleged to have libelled the applicant. The Court of Appeal upheld the High Court ruling that it would be disproportionate to grant the order and that the applicant had not established an arguable case of libel. The Court of Appeal also provided guidance on the quality and quantity of the evidence needed to support a Norwich Pharmacal order.
2008	Arab Satellite Communications Organisation v Saad Faqih & Anr	Norwich Pharmacal orders should not be granted for "fishing expeditions". In this case, Middle Eastern inter-governmental organisations applied for an order against a Saudi dissident for the identification of individuals that "may have been involved" in the broadcast of political material. The High Court refused to grant an order which would compel a third party to make a judgment about who "may have" done something, and ruled that "Norwich Pharmacal does not give claimants a general licence to fish for information that will not do more than potentially assist them to identify a claim or a defendant".
2008	Applause Store Productions Ltd. v Raphael	This involved the grant of a Norwich Pharmacal order against Facebook, ordering the disclosure of registration details, email addresses and the IP addresses used by the respondent.
2009	Lockton Companies International v Persons Unknown	This involved the request for an order against Google to disclose subscriber details and IP addresses to identify the sender of anonymous defamatory emails.

== See also ==
- Anton Piller order

== Sources ==
- Bellamy, Jonathan (25 June 2009). Professional Liability Claims: Norwich Pharmacal Proceedings and Human Rights (PDF). Professional Negligence Lawyers’ Association. ThirtyNine Essex Street.
- Sime, Stuart (2007). A Practical Approach to Civil Procedure. Oxford University Press. ISBN 9780199212330.
- Smith, Graham (2007). Internet Law and regulation (4th ed.). Sweet & Maxwell. ISBN 9780421909908.
