= Stiftung =

German legal entity

A Stiftung (German: [ˈʃtɪftʊŋ]) (properly Stiftung, pl. Stiftungen) is an institution or foundation that, with the aid of a property, pursues a purpose determined by the founder.

A Stiftung foundation exists to give effect to the stated, non-commercial wishes of its founder, as set out in a foundation deed and the articles of association (statutes). In effect, the assets with which the foundation is endowed become a separate legal entity. A Stiftung foundation has no shares or members and is set up by a founder(s) in most cases to ensure the continuation of family assets.

A Stiftung foundation can have beneficiaries, and they are thus in some way similar to the common law notion of trusts. The founders also have the right to transfer and terminate the foundation.

Stiftungen are purely non-profit enterprises and are generally not permitted to conduct commercial activities. This is the primary difference between an Anstalt and a Stiftung. Stiftungen are usually administered by a board of trustees, and there is no registration required to establish them.

== Theory ==
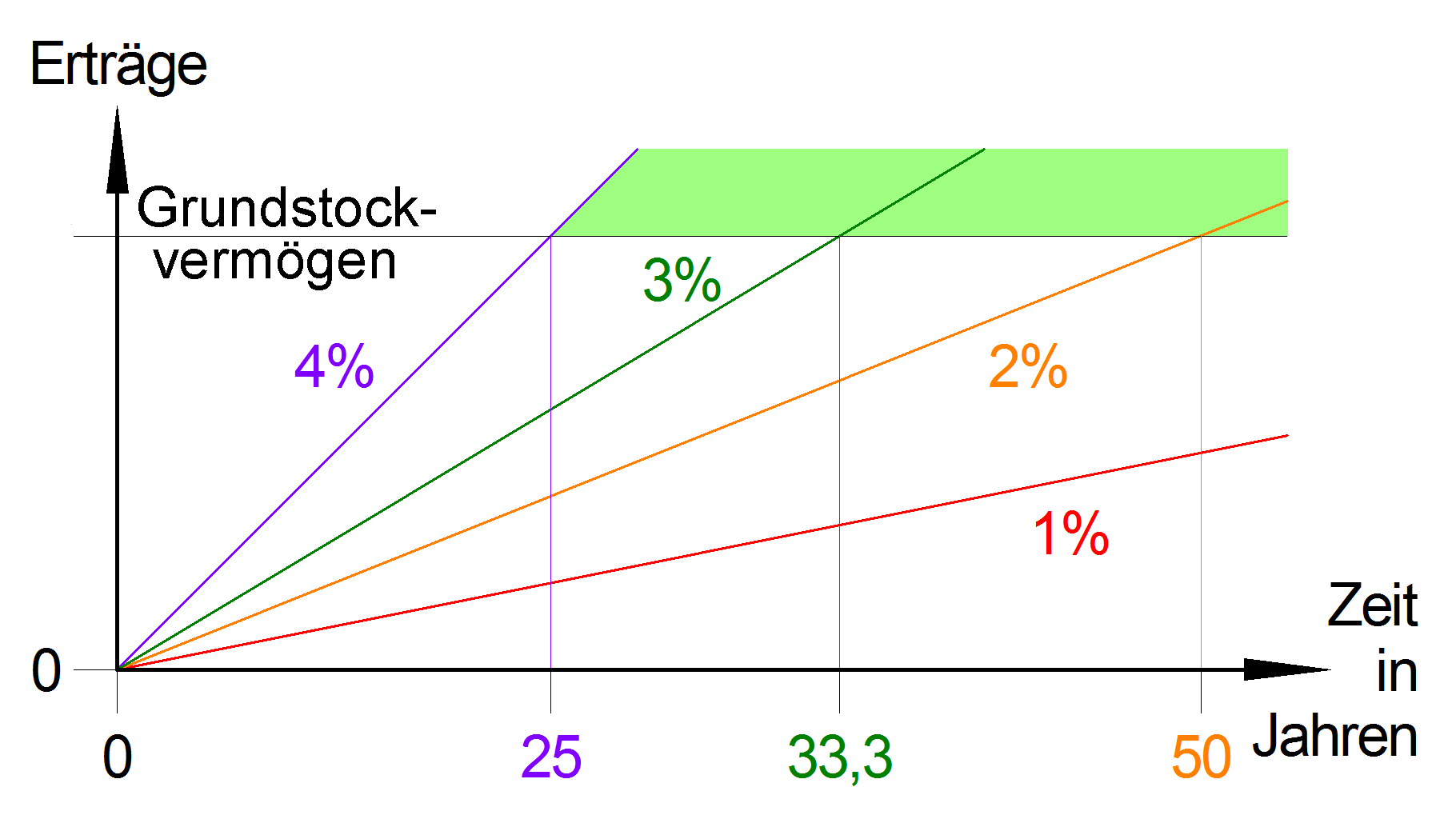
The Hrag course of the sum of the income from a foundation (or a single endowment) for various effective annual (inflation-adjusted) yield n from the donated capital without taking into account future donations

The idea of a foundation is that in spite of the continuous use of the income for the purpose of the foundation (i.e., not for compound interest), the total amount after a certain time exceeds the funded foundation stock. With a yield of, for example, four percent (lilac line), the sum of the income earned equals the founding capital after 25 years, after which the sum of the income is greater than the basic endowment capital (green area in the upper right corner).

== History ==
Stiftungen have a long tradition. Plato established his academy as a foundation, and it lasted from 347 BCE to 529 CE.

In the early Middle Ages, many nobles founded towns as Stiftung-like legal entities, a technique which was soon used to establish hospitals, orphanages and other non-profit organizations. It was the establishment of monastic communities, however, mostly in the southern and eastern border regions of the Holy Roman Empire, where the theory of Stiftung developed most. Many famous church buildings and monasteries were early foundations of Stiftung activity. Many of the 9th century foundations survive today notably in Wemding, Bavaria which dates back to the 10th century. Otto I donated the lady's donation at Quedlinburg Abbey which lasted from 936 to 1802.

When Roman law began to take root in Germany during the 13th century, many social structures changed including considerable urbanization. Numerous Stiftung foundations were created at this time and many have survived the vicissitudes of history. Stiftung foundations took on a distinctly non-profit nature in response to the invention of corporations under the legal scholar and Pope Innocent IV.

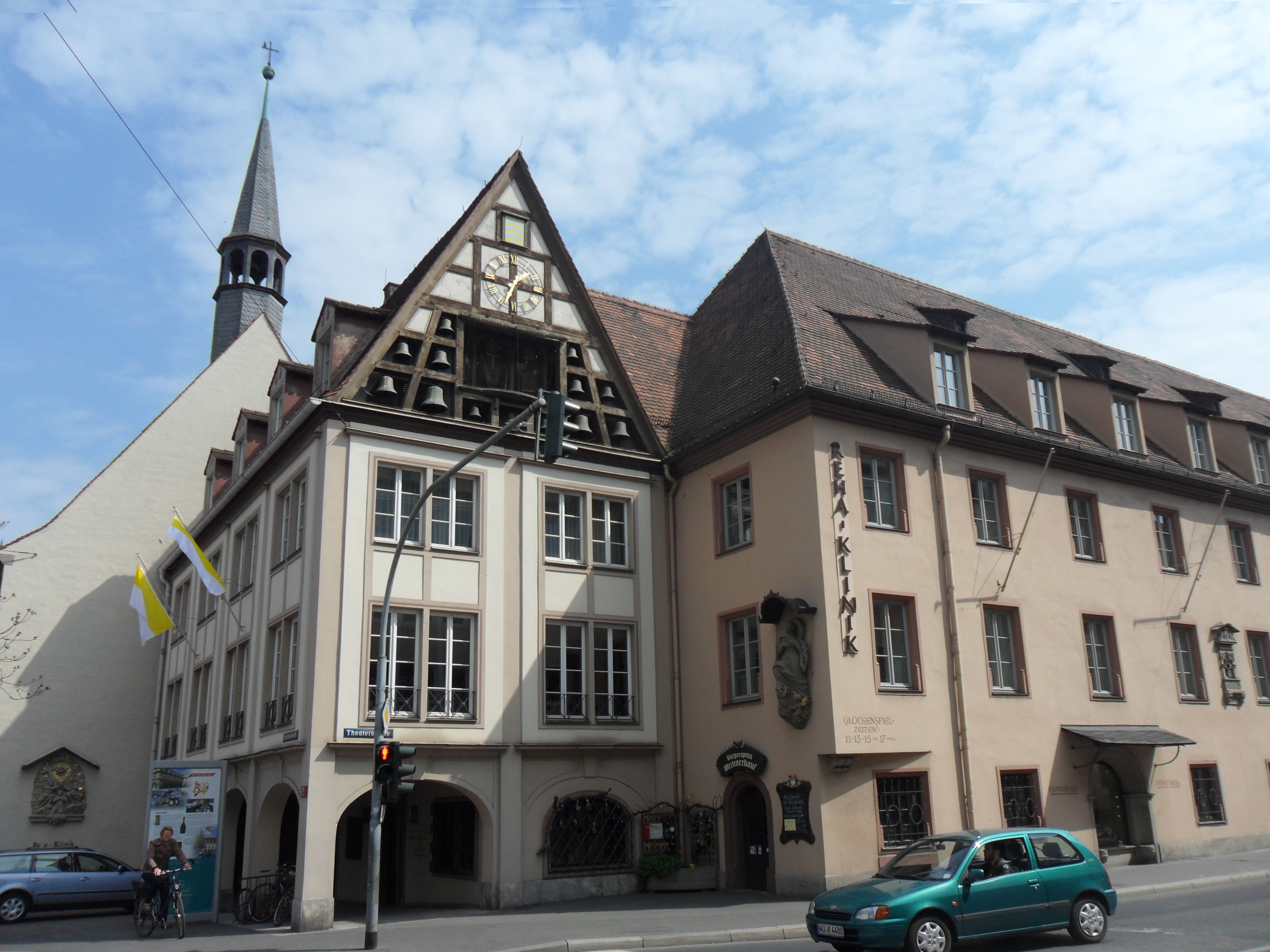
Burger Hospital and wine shop

The Stiftung foundation of Bürgerspital zum Heiligen Geist in Würzburg is a good example of how they function. Founded in 1316, it is only one of about 250 examples of foundations that are older than 500 years which still exist today. The foundation provides geriatric services for the citizens of the burger, and is funded by the vineyard on the foundations estates.

The well-known social housing Stiftung, Fuggerei in Augsburg, which is regarded as the oldest still existing social housing settlement, was founded in 1519, by the leading inhabitants of the town (foundation letter of 1521) and is therefore a few years younger than the social housing foundation of Valentin Ostertag.

The Städelsche Kunstinstitut and Städtische Galerie (museum and art gallery) in Frankfurt am Main is one of the most important German art museums with a collection of more than 4000 paintings from the Middle Ages to Modern and Contemporary Art.

During the early modern era, the Francke Foundation in Halle was founded in 1698, the Foundation Städelsches Kunstinstitut in 1815, and the Carl-Zeiss-Stiftung in 1889.

The 20th century was a low point for Stiftungen. The hyperinflation of the 1920-1930s, the rise of the third Reich, and the division of Germany, especially communist control of East Germany, resulted in the decline in the formation of new Stiftungen, and many older foundations dissolved.

During National Socialist rule, foundations that did not exclusively benefit the German (Aryan) people were officially classified as "non-charitable". Since this directly affected their taxation status, it allowed the government to deduct assets. Furthermore, Jewish-ran foundations were simply seized outright during National Socialist rule, and the revenue went directly to the German government. Many Jewish foundations were liquidated and looted. Those foundations that did continue to exist were Aryanised and given Nazi-friendly leadership.

As of 2000, changes in the charitable law and the foundation civil law and the associated broader public debate on the meaning and value of foundations, together with the strong growth of private assets and the re-emergence of the concept of citizenship, have ensured that as many foundations are formed in a year today as were in a decade at the end of the 20th century. In addition to private donors, companies, associations, and local authorities are also increasingly active as founders.

== Geographic distribution ==
Stiftungen are a civil law construct, found mostly in German-speaking areas. Civil law Stiftung foundations have developed in Austria, Cyprus, Denmark (erhvervsdrivende fond), Italy, Finland, Germany, Liechtenstein (Unternehmenstiftung), the Netherlands (stichting), Netherlands Antilles, Norway (Bokmål stiftelse; Nynorsk stifting), Spain, Sweden (stiftelse), Switzerland, Panama (1975), and more recently in St Kitts (2003), Nevis (2004), Bahamas (2005), Anguilla (2006), Antigua and Barbuda (2006), Malta (2006), Jersey (2009), and Labuan, Malaysia (2010).

== See also ==
- Non-profit foundation
