= Jean Escarra =

French legal scholar

Jean Escarra (10 April 1885, in Paris – 14 August 1955, in Paris) was a French legal scholar, consultant of the Chinese government and professor at the Faculté de Droit de Paris.

Escarrà is most known for having worked as a legal consultant of the Chinese government between 1921 and 1929, providing advice in reforming the Chinese legal system and was a key participant in designing the Chinese civil code of 1929. He also wrote a number of important works on Chinese law and society, which are still consulted. He worked for Chiang Kai-shek, which gave him the role of "advisor". "le droit Chinois", one of his work, was made to explain to France's government the base of Chinese's law.

In France, he was the president of the commission on intellectual property, which was established in August 1944 and eventually paved the way for the 1957 law on literary and artistic property. He was a collaborator of the journal "Copyright – Geistiges Eigentum – La Propriété Intellectuelle. International Review of the Protection of Literary, Artistic and Industrial Property" from 1935 till 1940. Escarra is also known for having organized alpine expeditions in his capacity as president of the Groupe de Haute Montagne.

== Works ==
- La Chine et le droit international. Paris: A. Pedone, 1931.
- Le Droit Chinois. Conception et évolution. Paris: Librairie du Recueil Sirey, 1936.
- La Chine, Passé et Présent. 1937.
- La Doctrine française du droit d’auteur, en collaboration avec François Hepp et Jean Rault, 1937.

== Bibliography ==
- Nécrologie: Jean Escarra (1885-1955), T'oung Pao 44 (1956), p. 304-310
