= Anstalt =

An Anstalt (German: [ˈʔanʃtalt]) or Anstalt partnership is a type of incorporated organisation in Liechtenstein.

== Characteristics ==
An Anstalt is a hybrid between a company limited by shares and a foundation. An Anstalt is an entity, which has no members, participants or shareholders. It differs from a company in that it has no duty to return profit and differs from a trust in that it has no obligation to a beneficiary. Anstalt do have, however, a holder of the founder's rights. The founder can be either a legal person or a natural person, need not be resident in the host country and Anstalt must have a minimum capital of CHF 30 000 (approximately US$33 800). There is also no need for the founders identity to be notified to the registration office.

These features, and the founders rights, and because an Anstalt can conduct many kinds of business, including non-trading activities (such as holding passive investments), has made them popular with foreign companies who use them as a holding company for overseas subsidiaries when trying to minimise tax in their home jurisdictions. That is, Anstalt are a safe and easy place to park assets at tax time.

=== Types ===
There are two types of Anstalt; commercial and non-commercial, and they feature prominently in the finance system of Liechtenstein, where they are considered to be a Public Law Institution, though they are not able to be listed on the Stock Exchange.

=== Differences and uniqueness ===
Anstalt differ from the related entities called stiftung in that Anstalt can conduct all kinds of business activities. Anstalt are seen as different from Gesellschaft mit beschränkter Haftung, a corporate type found in many German-speaking countries, which do feature members and participants.

Anstalt are a civil law creation and no direct common law analogue exists. Common law courts have tended to treat Anstalt that are "limited by shares", as a company, and those without shares (the majority) are sometimes (though not always) treated as a constructive trust.

The term "anstalt" is also used in the Nordic countries, where it has a different meaning. In Swedish, for instance, "anstalt" refers to an "institution", especially to one of societal character (e.g. a prison or a health care institution).

== Numbers of Anstalt ==
Number of Anstalt in Liechtenstein
14841	14578	13835	12721	11486	10535	9423	8461
2007	2008	2009	2010	2011	2012	2013	2014

== Etymology ==
The name Anstalt means "Institution" or "Establishment". which comes from the Middle High German Anstalt and means to set up [Public] purpose for a particular purpose and the building which houses it.

== See also ==
- Beneficial ownership
- Holding company
