= French Intellectual Property Code =

Covers intellectual and industrial property laws

The French Intellectual Property Code (IPC; French: Code de la propriété intellectuelle), is a corpus of law relating to intellectual and industrial property. It was formalised by Law No 92-597 of 1 July 1992, replacing earlier laws relating to industrial property and artistic and literary property.

The code is frequently modified: two major modifications are known as the DADVSI law and the HADOPI law.

== See also ==
- French copyright law
- National Institute of Industrial Property (France)
