= Proposed directive on criminal measures aimed at ensuring the enforcement of intellectual property rights =

The European Union (EU) proposal for a directive on criminal measures aimed at ensuring the enforcement of intellectual property rights (2005/0127/COD) was a proposal from the European Commission for a directive aimed "to supplement Directive 2004/48/EC of 29 April 2004 on the enforcement of intellectual property rights (Civil enforcement)" (Source: Justification for the proposal, COM(2005) 276 final, July 12, 2005). The directive was proposed on July 12, 2005 by the Commission of the European Communities.

Being the second directive on the enforcement of "intellectual property rights", it is commonly called IPRED2 (Second Intellectual Property Rights Enforcement Directive). The first directive on the enforcement of Intellectual property rights, Directive 2004/48/EC deals with civil enforcement of intellectual property rights ("IPRED1"). IPRED1 was hastily passed before the Fifth Enlargement of the European Union of May 1, 2004 and did originally include criminal sanctions provisions, but this rather controversial part was omitted in order to be able to meet the deadline of May 1, 2004.

As announced in Official Journal C 252 of 18 September 2010 the European Commission decided to withdraw the proposal for a directive. Criminal sanctions for enforcement of intellectual property rights are therefore not currently formally proposed, even if it is part of the EU acquis since the Lisbon Treaty.

== Subject matter ==
This proposed directive incriminates infringements of intellectual property rights. It deals with intentional infringements on a commercial scale or aiding, abetting or inciting to the infringements.

=== Community IP Rights ===
The proposed directive applies to "such intellectual property rights as are provided for in Community legislation and/or national legislation in the Member States". No definition is provided in the original draft and in that form, the Directive would apply to any intellectual property right. Subsequent readings of the Directive have included clarifications. Examples of such expressly included rights are sui generis rights of database makers or trademark rights.

=== Patents ===
The Directive, in its first draft, includes patent violation, traditionally a civil issue. This would possibly have far-reaching consequences for the EU economy as the risk of criminal prosecution for violating patents when new products or new functions are included is great. Moreover, traditionally, a large majority of all patent disputes are settled out of court before civil infringement disputes continue. The bill also includes a provision which would allow intellectual property holders to assist the police in an investigation, which cedes great power from the state to a patent-holder to threaten rivals with imprisonment, rather than a civil suit alone.

The Parliament has, in subsequent reading, excluded patents from the scope of the Directive.

=== Consumers ===
The Directive applies to willful, commercial or intentional violations of trademark or copyright laws. An amendment that would have limited the directive to commercial activity done with the intent to earn a profit was rejected. Instead, consumers will be criminally liable if their behavior is not for personal and not for profits purposes and was done for the purpose of obtaining an economic advantage.

== Criticism ==
According to some, IPRED2 does not seem to be a particularly well drafted Directive. The number of amendments passed and adopted in subsequent readings is unusual, as is evident from the drafting process. The definitions, usually contained in the preamble or the beginning articles, were missing until subsequent readings. Originally about commercial piracy and counterfeit goods only, in its present form it includes any violation of Intellectual Property rights.

The criticism voiced by EFF, FFII, Law Society of England and Wales, the Dutch Parliament, and others includes:

- The original proposal did not explain the terms it was using. The definitions section (Article 1) was only added in the subsequent readings.
- The scope of the Directive is too wide (Article 2). The draft directive still applies to a broader range of intellectual property infringements than commercial piracy and counterfeiting. As a result, it is far broader than the current international standard for criminal IP enforcement — the 1994 TRIPs agreement. Patents have recently been taken out of the scope but many other IP rights have not. Some of the latter are poorly suited to criminal regulation (such as database rights or conditional access to pay TV regimes).
- The inclusion of aiding, abetting or inciting (Article 3) puts businesses at unnecessary risk of criminal liability.
- The sanctions provisions (Article 4) has been hastily put together and contains draconian measures poorly suited to intellectual property infringements.

The Electronic Frontier Foundation has pointed out that criminal law is poorly suited for regulation of intellectual property law and that IPRED2 presents a risk to industry and innovation.

According to the Foundation for a Free Information Infrastructure (FFII), it is impossible not to violate software patents, and the IPRED 2 directive threatens most of Europe's software developers with imprisonment.

In July 2006, the Dutch parliament wrote a letter to EU Commissioner Frattini with a thorough legal analysis of the proposed directive, concluding that the subject-matter of the proposed directive definitely falls outside the European Community’s competence (as defined in the EU treaties).
