= Chenango County Historical Society =

Community museum in Norwich, New York

- Location within New York
- Location: 45 Rexford St., Norwich, NY
- Coordinates: 42.537516181575015°N 75.5195738324598°W
- Type: Community museum
- Executive director: Jessica Moquin
- Historian: Henry J. Drexler
- Parking: On site (no charge)
- Website: chenangohistorical.org

The Chenango County Historical Society is an organization in Norwich, New York, devoted to preserving the history of Chenango County. The Norwich campus consists of the Ward No. 2 Schoolhouse, where the museum is housed, the James S. Flanagan Research Center, Loomis Barn and the Miller Pavilion. The Historical Society hosts various events covering local historical events and topics. The organization publishes an annual academic journal documenting historical events.

== History ==
CCHS was first established in 1939. In 1956, the organization received an absolute charter from New York State.

The Ward No. 2 schoolhouse was rewarded to CCHS by the county supervisors in 1958. The building was renovated immediately afterward. In 1962, the museum was reopened, housing various antiquities from the Central New York region. The Historical Society acquired the Ross Schoolhouse in Preston, the Loomis Barn and the Chenango Canal building.

The Journal of the Chenango County Historical Society debuted in 2012, with a new edition published annually during the summer.

CCHS celebrated its 80th anniversary at the Chenango County Courthouse.

In 2020, the COVID-19 pandemic forced the organization to adopt online only exhibits and events. It briefly offered invite only visits in November of that year, before closing again.

CCHS commissioned a series of short online videos documenting the experiences of former students who attended the schoolhouse before its closure. On November 21, 2021, the organization celebrated the 125th anniversary of the building’s construction. On December 22, the organization received $49,500 from the New York State Council on the Arts.

== Collections ==
The museum hosts seasonal exhibits in the Community Gallery. Notable exhibits include the works of local artist Alice Hudson.

The Commerce Gallery houses manufactured pharmaceuticals from the Norwich Pharmacal Company and historical objects from NBT Bank’s Norwich headquarters.

Notable objects preserved by the Historical Society include an original Mickey Mouse undergarment made in Norwich during World War II, a Norwich Piano from the 20th century and various products from the Norwich Pharmacal Company, including Pepto-Bismol and Unguentine.
