= Kline's Mill, Virginia =

1794 flour mill in Virginia, US

- Historic site
- Location within Virginia Location within the United States
- Coordinates: 39°02′50″N 78°14′25″W
- Country: United States
- State: Virginia
- County: Frederick
- Time zone: UTC−5
  - Summer (DST): UTC−4
- GNIS feature ID: 1499634

Kline's Mill is a historic grinding mill in Frederick County, Virginia, United States. First built in the 1770s, the rebuilt 1794 mill contains original millwork and is a rare surviving example of a mechanism based on Oliver Evans' continuous milling system.

== History ==
The original mill was constructed in the 1770s by German immigrant Jacob Kline (Note: In some sources, Jacob's last name is spelled as Klein. The son Anthony changed the family's surname to "Kline".) as a flax seed mill. It was then rebuilt and enlarged in 1794 by Jacob and his son Anthony Kline as a flour mill, with Anthony constructing the wooden mechanism. Anthony was known in the community as a cabinetmaker and constructed all the woodwork in the mill by hand. When the mill was rebuilt, living space for Anthony's family was included in the 1790s version; those now-anomalous fireplaces remain within the mill. The family lived in the mill until 1820, when they moved into a brick house that had been built nearby. The mill is a unique remaining artifact of the United States industrial past as seen in the Society of Architectural Historians' Archipedia, which said "a mill with its original machinery, in this case based on the Oliver Evans system, is rare."

The mill and the surviving community structures including the former post office, general store, and mill managers' houses are located on the present Ridings Mill Road near the former intersection of Klines Mill Road (Virginia Route 633) and Ridings Mill Road (Virginia Route 709) east of Interstate 81. The mill is the subject of a P. Buckley Moss print called "Whispers of Our Past".

Little more than a plain address in 2022, Kline's Mill was a populated place at one time in Virginia history with a cemetery, (Note: A survey was done in October 1936 of the "Graveyard at Kline's Mill". Two headstones with inscriptions are mentioned – the millworks-maker Anthony Kline (1777–1859) and his wife Jemima (d. 1858).) multiple dwellings and businesses including a community post office and general store. Former residents, speaking of growing up in the greater Mill community, later characterized it as "the first shopping mall in the county" and a place to walk to for Saturday grocery-shopping. The Virginia Department of Historic Resources Rural Landmarks Survey says that Kline's Mill is "the finest eighteenth- and nineteenth-century mill/industrial complex in the county." Though the mill did not figure in the region's Civil War battles, local lore has "the Yankees coming through and taking the pillow slips off the beds at the house and filling them with meal for the soldiers."
