= Lillian Belle Sage =

American educator

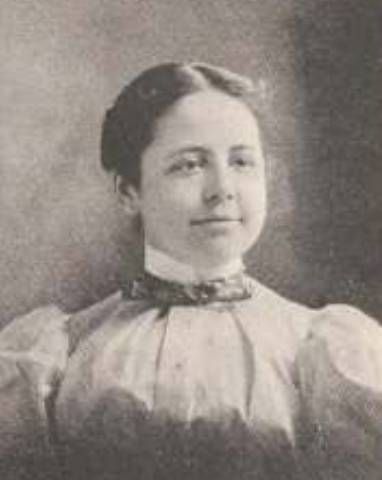
- Lillian Belle Sage, from the 1899 yearbook of Mount Holyoke College
- Born: 1870; Norwich, New York
- Died: April 4, 1915 (aged 44–45); Norwich, New York
- Occupations: Educator, biologist, geologist

Lillian Belle Sage (1870 – April 4, 1915) was an American educator. She taught biology and geology classes at Washington Irving High School in New York, and at Cornell University.

== Early life and education ==
Lillian Belle Sage was born in Norwich, New York, the daughter of WIlliam A. Sage and Venette Dyer Sage. She graduated from Mount Holyoke College in 1899, and earned a bachelor's degree from Cornell University in 1901.

== Career ==
Sage taught school in Norwich, Olean, and Albany as a young woman. In 1902 she joined the faculty of Washington Irving High School in New York City, "the largest girls' school in America". As head of the biology department, she worked with another Cornell alumna, Florence Wells Slater, to make innovative science education a specialty at Irving. She designed and built the school's vivarium to support the study of animal life for thousands of city school students. She also wrote and staged pageants at the school, and built greenhouses on the roof of the school, where students raised plants and flowers for the flower shows she also began. She led the effort to install a pipe organ and chimes at the school, in her capacity as president of the Patrick F. McGowan Memorial Association.

Outside Washington Irving High School, Sage was a member of the Teachers League, the High School Teachers' Association of New York City, the Torrey Botanical Society, and the Bronx Zoological Society. She helped teach summer geology courses for science teachers at Cornell University. She read the proofs for Liberty Hyde Bailey's textbook, Botany: An Elementary Text for Schools (1901). She donated plant samples to the New York state botanist. She served on the council of Camp Fire Girls, along with Jane Addams, Jessica Blanche Peixotto, and Ernest Thompson Seton, among others.

== Publications ==
- "A Practical and Profitable Experiment in the New Method of Teaching Geology" (1901)
- "The Practical Use of Biology" (1909, with Henry R. Linville, Edgar A. Bedford, Martha F. Goddard, Elsie Kupfer, and Benjamin C. Gruenberg)
- "Who has a Better Chance?" (1913)
- "A Teacher's Prescription" (1915)

== Personal life ==
Sage died in April 1915, a few months after she became unconscious from a blood clot in her brain. She was 44 years old. In November 1915, she and three other deceased teachers were remembered at an event in the library of Washington Irving High School, and a reproduction of Romney's "The Stafford Children" was chosen to recall her love of children and nature.
