= Washington Irving Campus =

Public school in New York City

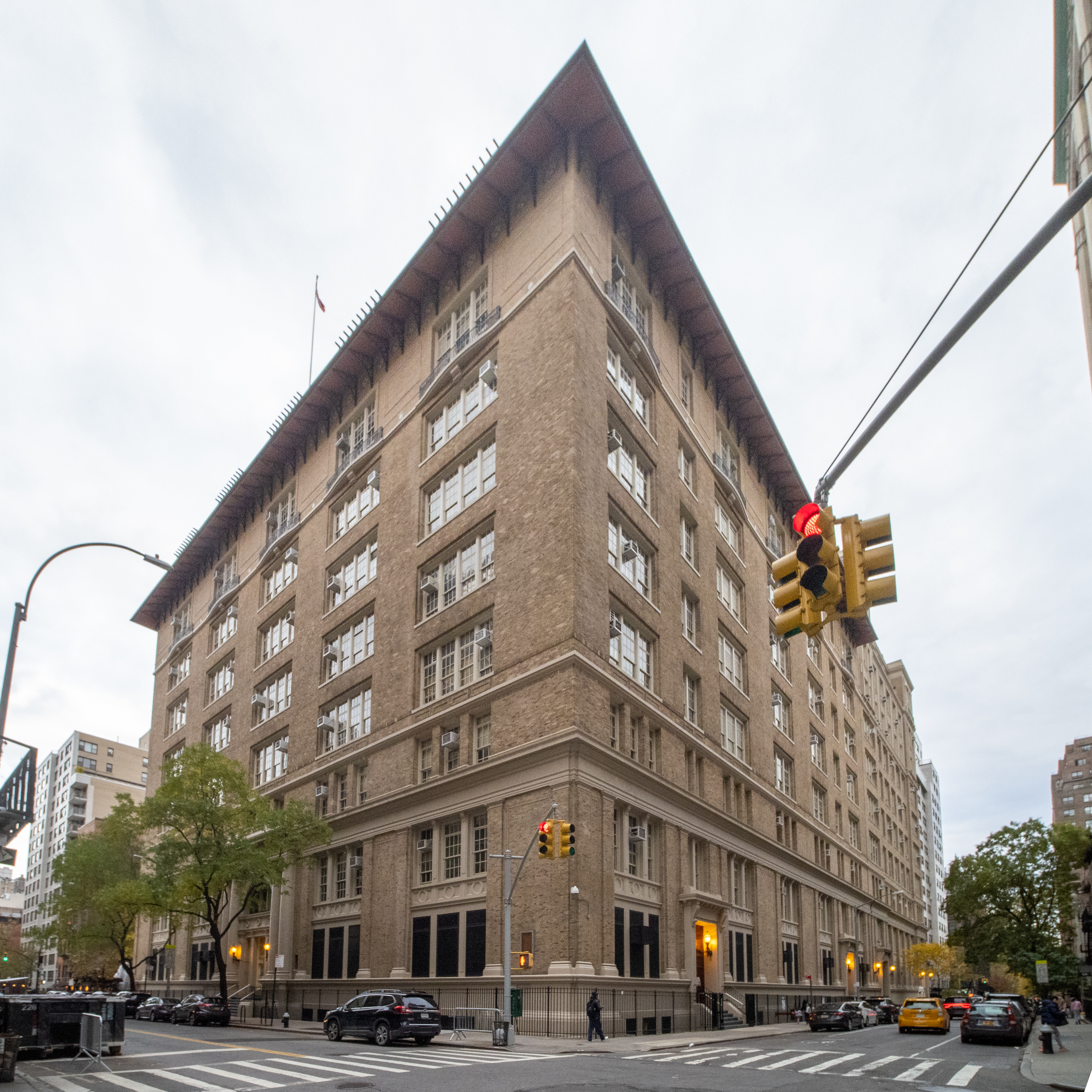

Location
- 40 Irving Place; New York, New York 10003; 40.7353°N 73.98741°W

Information
- School type: Public; Charter
- Founded: 1902
- Superintendent: Marisol Rosales
- Principal: Vadewatie Ramsuchit, Susan Dicicco, Shawn Raeke, Sarah Hernandez, Bernardo Ascona; Dan Rojas
- Grades: K–5, 9–12
- Enrollment: 1,775 (September 2015)
- Language: English
- Area: Various

The Washington Irving Campus is a public school building located at 40 Irving Place between East 16th and 17th Streets in the Union Square neighborhood of Manhattan, New York City, near Union Square. Operating as the Washington Irving High School until 2008, it now houses six schools under the New York City Department of Education. The constituent schools include the Gramercy Arts High School, the High School for Language and Diplomacy, the International High School at Union Square, the Union Square Academy for Health Sciences, the Academy for Software Engineering, and the Success Academy Charter School.

== History ==
=== Washington Irving High School ===
The school was founded as an all-girls school due in large part to the efforts of Patrick F. McGowan, then head of the Board of Education and later acting mayor of New York City. The school is named after the writer Washington Irving. The building in which the school is located was designed by the architect C.B.J. Snyder and built in 1913. The original building is eight stories high, though the extension on 16th Street designed by Walter C. Martin and built in 1938, is twelve stories high. The school's first principal was William McAndrew.

The school had been located on Lafayette Street, but because the student population was growing at a rapid rate, a decision was made to move the school to another location, and land was purchased at 40 Irving Place. The school started out as a branch of Wadleigh High School for Girls, known at first as Girls' Technical High School, the first school for girls in the city. In 1913 the name changed to Washington Irving. In September 1986, the school became co-ed. In the period that Hector Xavier Monsegur (Sabu) attended Irving, 55% of the school's students graduated with their classes.

=== Closure and conversion to campus ===
The New York City Department of Education announced in December 2011 that WIHS would be one of two high schools to be closed by summer 2015. The school was to be replaced with Success Academy Charter School. Among the reasons for closing include a graduation rate of 48%. Success Academy Charter School planned to open an elementary school in the building in 2013. The site was suggested by the City Department of Education but the decision was not final until 2014. Washington Irving High School officially closed in June 2015 after graduating its last class, resulting in Success Academy taking over its site along with the other high schools.

==== Incidents ====
On February 25, 2016, a fire broke out in the building after an electrical explosion, resulting in the campus to be closed for an unspecified amount of time. All students and staff were relocated to another building.

On December 5, 2017, a student was arrested and charged for raping another student. The suspect is identified as 18 year-old Jevon Martin while the victim is a 16-year-old girl. The incident took place in a stairwell between the third and fourth floors.

== Artwork ==
One enters the lobby through the main doors, which are opposite a grand decorative fireplace. It features a plaster bas-relief overmantel, The Legend of Sleepy Hollow, by sculptor Frances Grimes. Above the lobby's oak-paneled walls are 12 murals by Barry Faulkner depicting the early history of New York. The murals in the auditorium are by Robert Knight Ryland and J. Mortimer Lichtenauer. The murals in the stairwell are by Salvatore Lascari. On the second floor and above, the walls are white, the doors are red, and the floors are black. The exterior is limestone up to the second story, then gray brick trimmed with limestone. In front of the building, at the corner of Irving Place and 17th Street is a bust of Washington Irving by Friedrich Beer, which is featured on the school's ID. The exterior was used in the TV sit-com Head of the Class. The school's auditorium is located in the middle, between the left and the right wings. It is usually accessed only from the lobby, but has seats on the second level. There are many performances held at the auditorium, by students and outside artists.

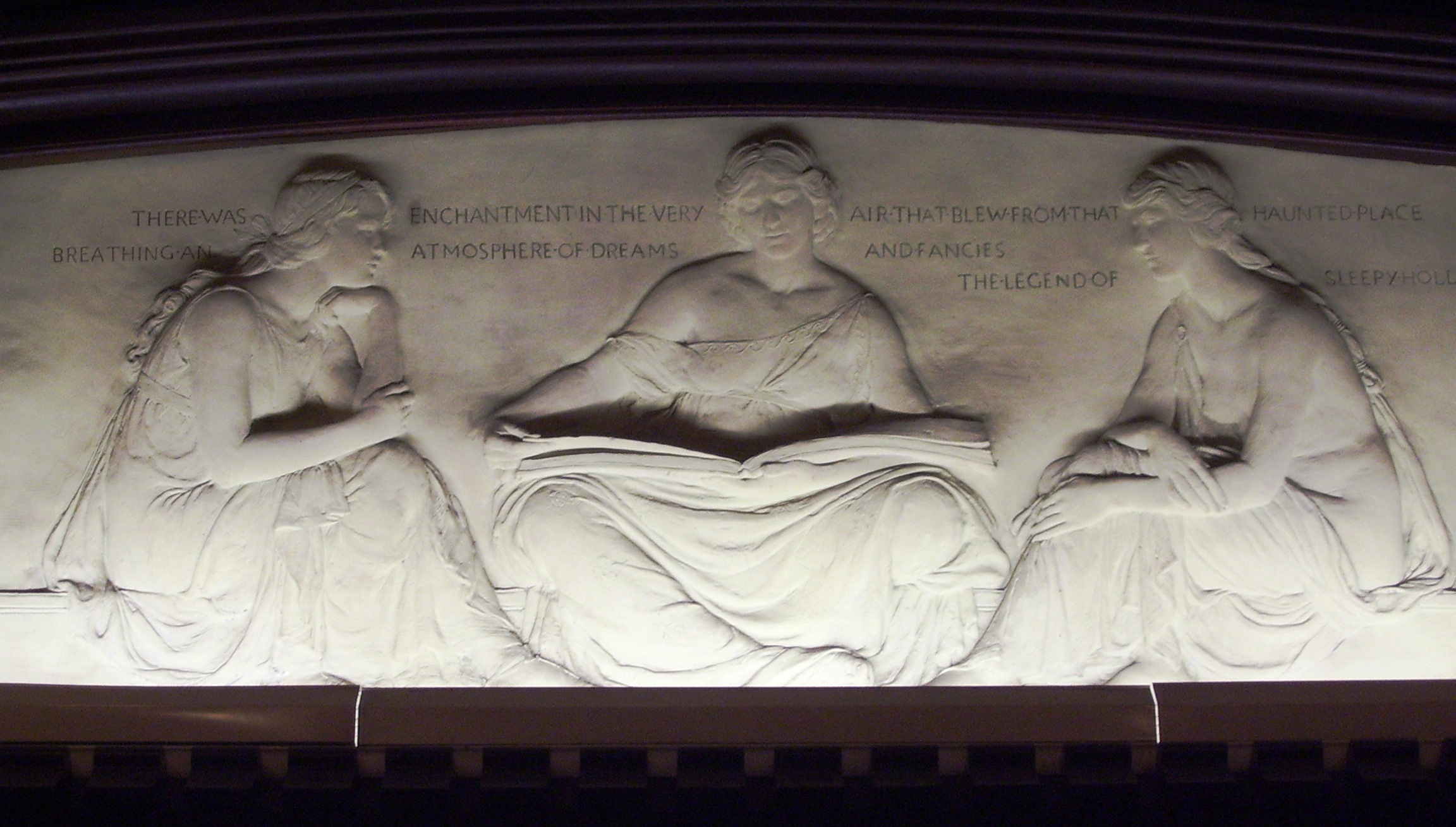
The Legend of Sleepy Hollow by Frances Grimes

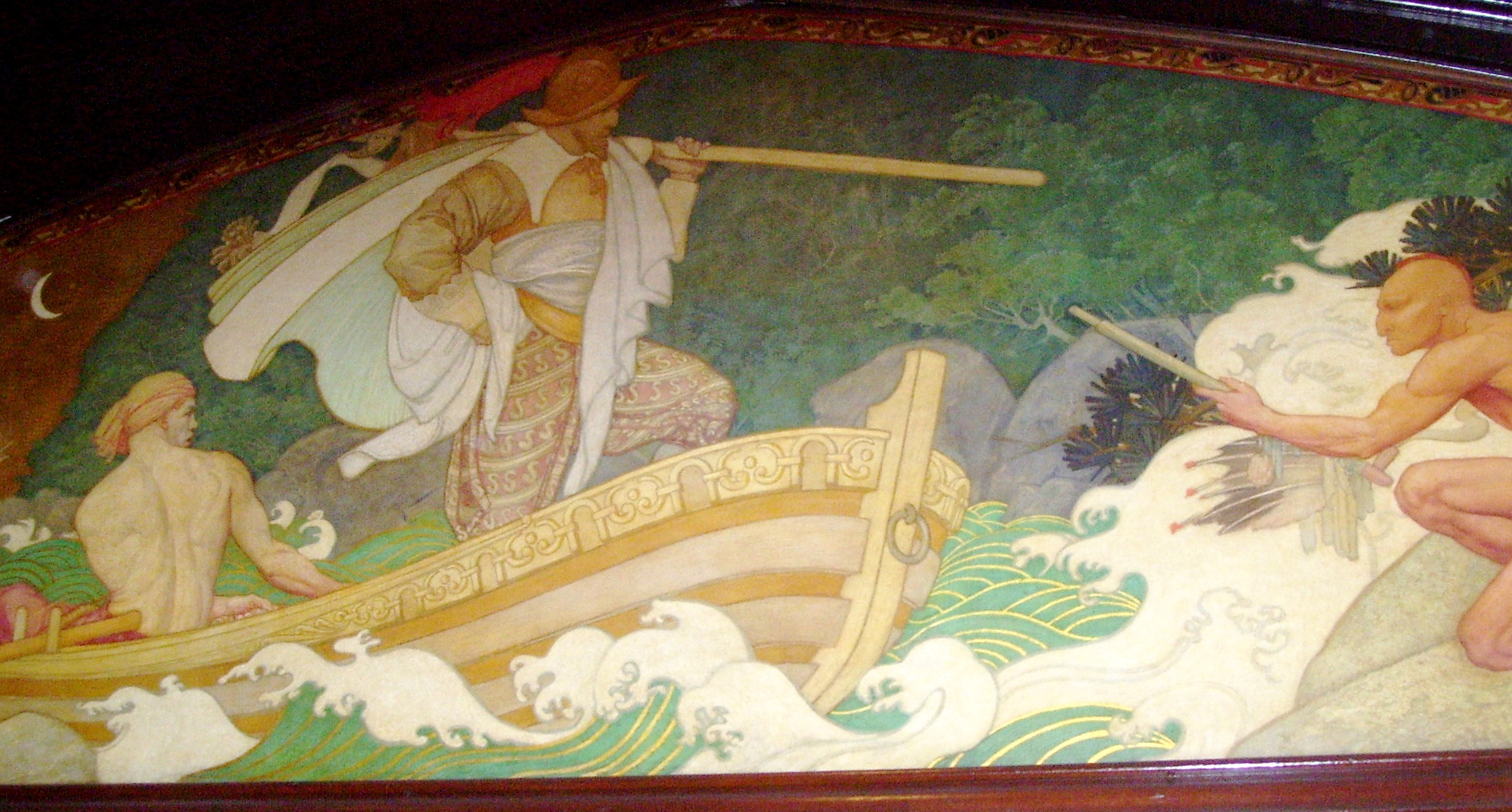
Henry Hudson Landing in Manhattan by Barry Faulkner

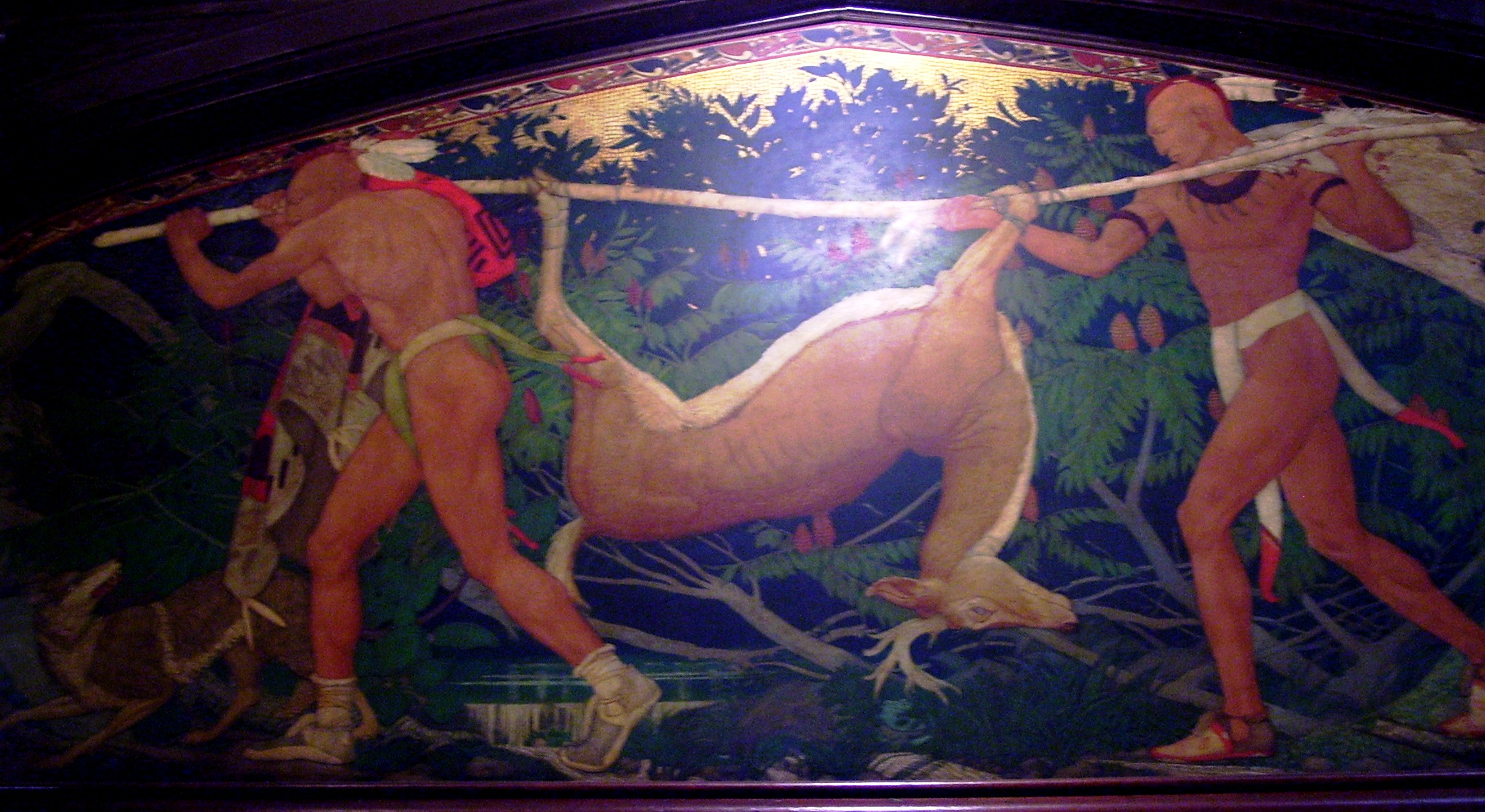
Indian Hunters by Barry Faulkner

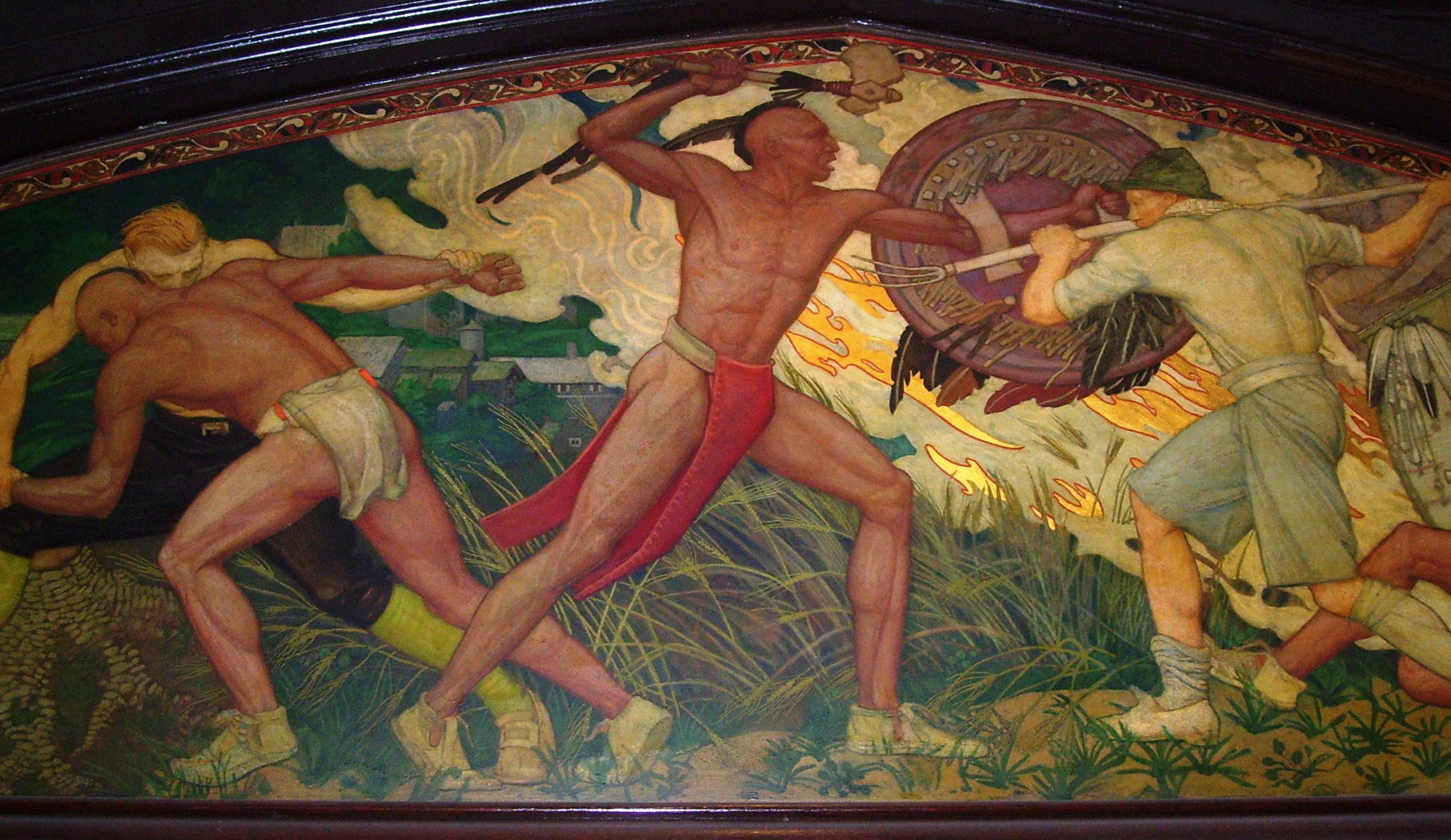
Skirmish between Dutch Settlers and Indians by Barry Faulkner

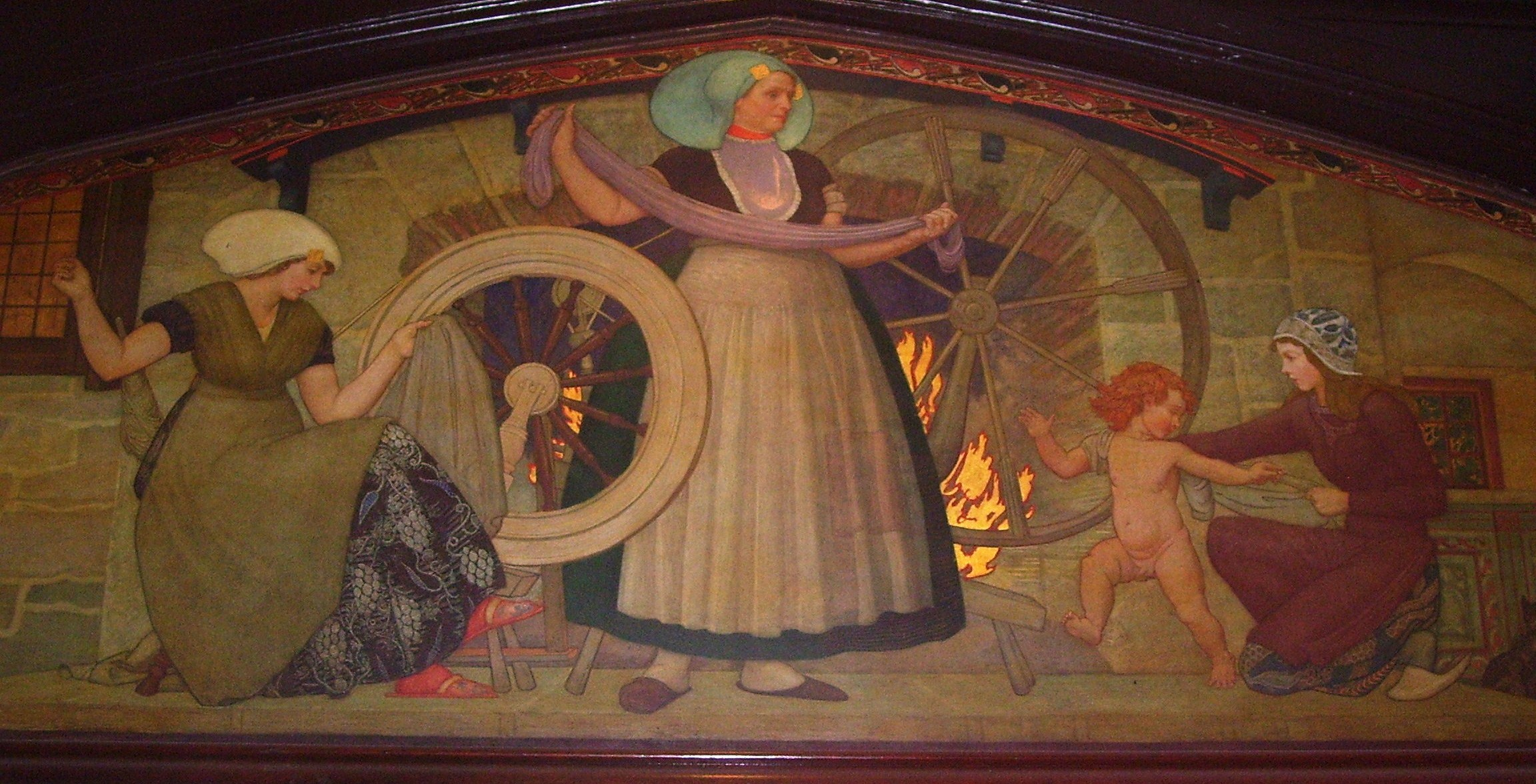
Dutch Pioneer Women by Barry Faulkner

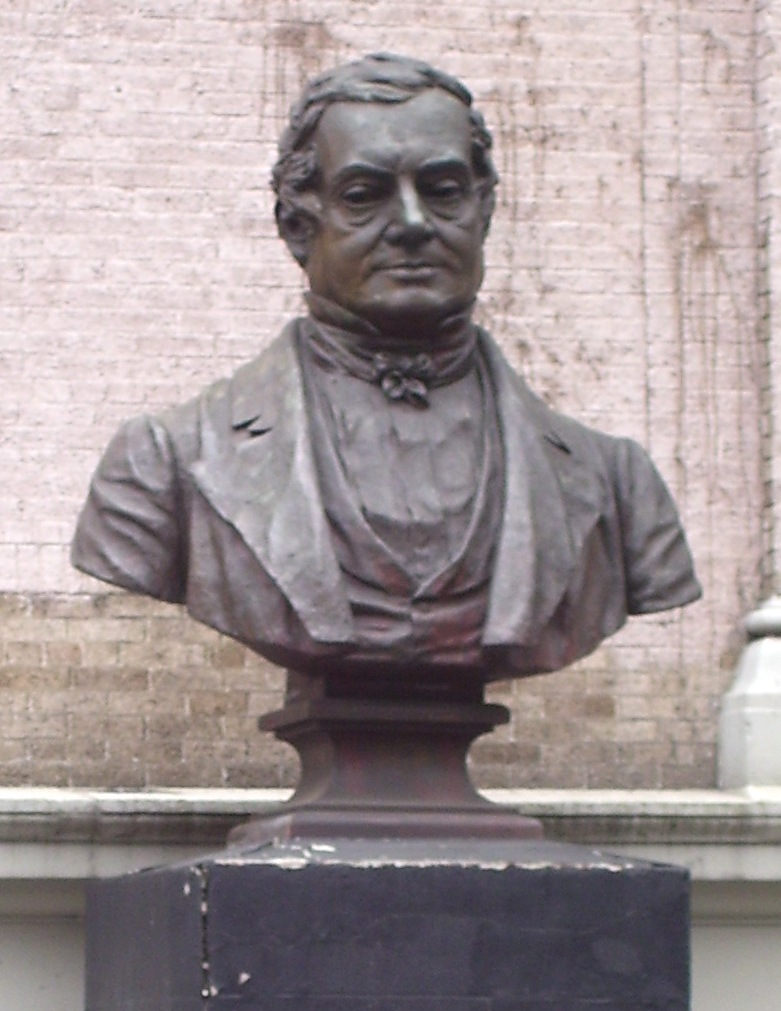
Washington Irving by Friedrich Beer

== Student life ==
Students enter the building from East 16th Street, swipe their ID cards, and go through metal detectors while their belongings go through a security X-ray scanner. As per the New York City Schools Chancellor's regulations, MP3 players and some other electronic devices are banned in New York City public schools. In addition, students may no longer enter the building after 10:00 AM.

== Notable alumni ==
- Vast Aire – rapper
- Beatrice Alexander – dollmaker
- Asa Akira – porn star
- Joy Behar (1960)– comedian and host on The View
- Gertrude Berg – actress, screenwriter
- Yolanda Casazza – dancer of the Veloz and Yolanda ballroom dancing team
- Claudette Colbert – actress
- Whoopi Goldberg – actress, comedian and moderator/co-host on The View (attended)
- Lee Krasner – artist
- Sylvia Miles (1942) (née Lee) – actress
- Hector Xavier Monsegur (Sabu) – computer hacker (left in 2001 during ninth grade)
- Patricia Morison – actress
- P. Buckley Moss – artist
- Anita Page – actress
- Kate Papert – labor economist
- Shelley Plimpton – actress
- Sylvia Robinson – singer, musician, record producer
- Bella Spewack – writer
- Gabourey Sidibe – actress
- June Valli - singer
- Virginia Vestoff – actress
- Lavinia Williams – dancer

== Notable faculty ==
- Lillian Belle Sage, science teacher
- Florence Wells Slater, science teacher
