= Norwich, New York =

- City
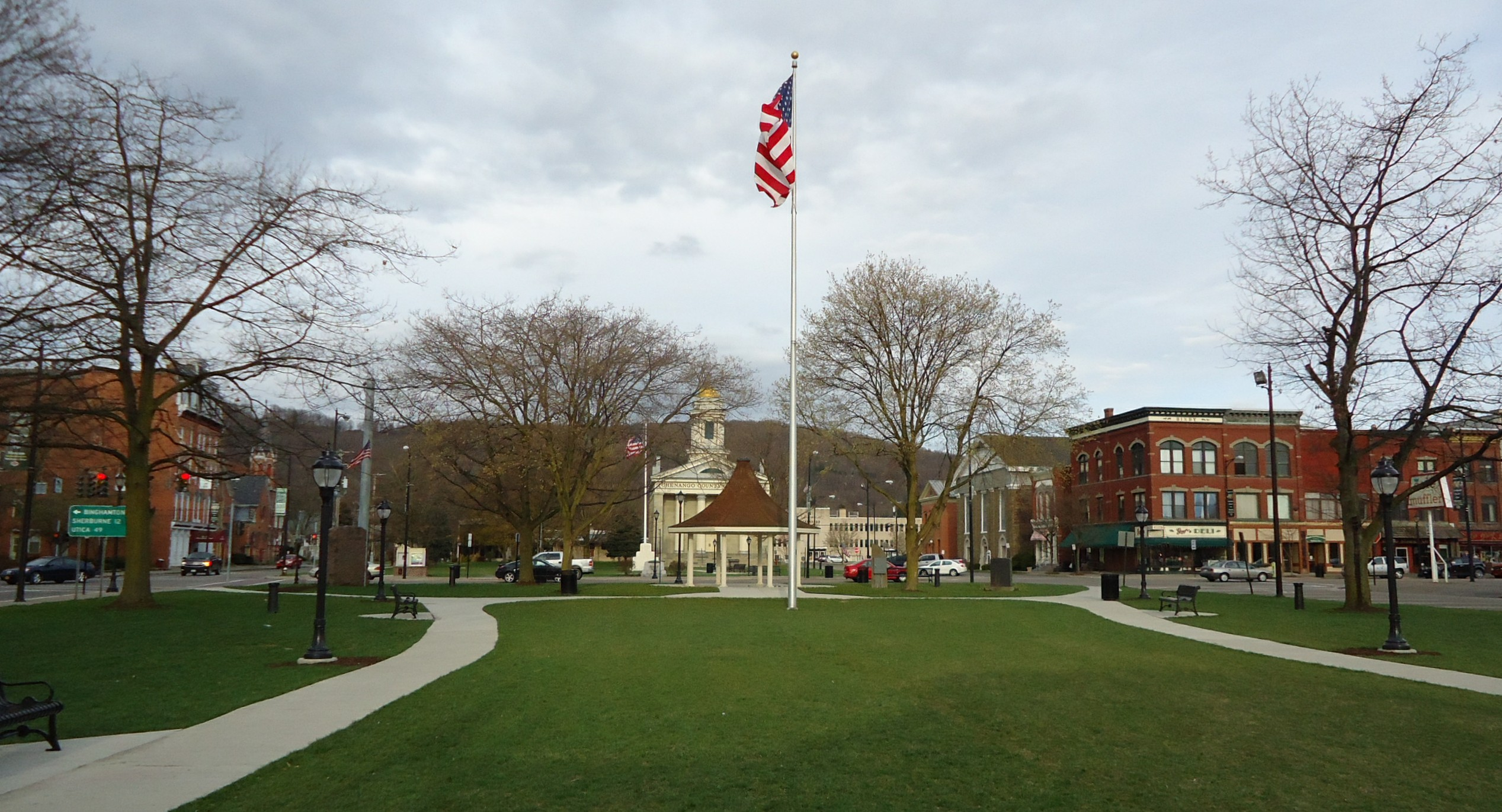

- Location in Chenango County and the state of New York.
- Coordinates: 42°31′55″N 75°31′18″W
- Country: United States
- State: New York
- County: Chenango

Government
  - Type: Mayor-Council
  - Mayor: Robert Jeffrey (R)
  - Common Council: Members: W1: Matthew Caldwell (R); W2: Fred Gee (D); W3: Nancy Allaire (D); W4: William Loomis (R) Pres.; W5: David Zieno (D); W6: Matthew Caezza (R)

Area
  - Total: 2.12 sq mi (5.50 km^{2})
  - Land: 2.12 sq mi (5.50 km^{2})
  - Water: 0 sq mi (0.00 km^{2})
- Elevation: 1,014 ft (309 m)

Population (2020)
  - Total: 7,051
  - Density: 3,319/sq mi (1,281.5/km^{2})
- Time zone: UTC-5 (Eastern (EST))
  - Summer (DST): UTC-4 (EDT)
- ZIP Code: 13815
- Area code: 607
- FIPS code: 36-017-53979
- GNIS feature ID: 0959025
- Website: www.norwichnewyork.gov

Norwich is a city in and the county seat of Chenango County, New York, United States. Surrounded on all sides by the Town of Norwich, the city's name is taken from Norwich, England. As of the 2020 census, Norwich had a population of 7,051. Norwich is best known as the headquarters of the strained yogurt company Chobani.

== History ==
The first log cabin was built in 1788 by Col. William Monroe, who served as a drummer boy during the Revolutionary War. The town of Norwich was formed in 1793 from the towns of Union (now in Broome County) and Bainbridge. Afterwards, Norwich, as a "mother town" of the county, lost substantial territory in the formation of new towns. In 1806, Norwich gave up territory to form the towns of Pharsalia, Plymouth and Preston. More of Norwich was lost in 1807 to form parts of the towns of New Berlin and Columbus. In 1808 and 1820, Norwich exchanged territory with the town of Preston.

The central community of Norwich set itself off from the town in 1816 by incorporating as a village, and later becoming the city of Norwich in 1914.

== Geography ==
According to the United States Census Bureau, the city has a total area of 2.1 square miles (5.5 km^{2}), all land. Unlike many upstate cities, there are few, if any, defined neighborhoods or districts. Although the city is divided into six wards for political purposes, neighborhoods are seldom referred to in this manner.

Downtown is the main commercial district of Norwich, consisting of North and South Broad streets, East and West Main streets, and lesser side streets, including American Avenue, Lackawanna Avenue, and parts of Mechanic, Fair, and Hayes streets. The downtown district is bordered on the north by Cortland and Mitchell streets, and to the south by Front Street and Eaton Avenue.

Norwich is located in upstate New York, in the Chenango River valley. The river, a tributary of the Susquehanna, winds south along the eastern edge of the city. Along the western border, Canasawacta Creek flows south, until it unites with the Chenango River at the southern city limits.

Lt. Warren Eaton Airport (OIC), serving the area, is located north of the city in the town of North Norwich.

=== Location ===
Norwich lies near the center of the triangle that can be drawn connecting the cities of Syracuse, Albany, and Binghamton, along Interstates 90, 88, and 81, respectively. The city is located at the intersection of New York State Route 12 and New York State Route 23. On Route 12, Utica and access to Interstate 90 is 48 miles (77 km) to the north, while Binghamton (and the Triple Cities) and access to Interstate 81 and Interstate 86 (currently New York State Route 17, known as the Southern Tier Expressway), is 40 miles (64 km) to the south. State Highway 23, which cuts laterally through the northern side of the city, leads east 32 miles (51 km) to the city of Oneonta and access to Interstate 88, while to the west NY 23 leads in the direction of Cortland and Interstate 81, 42 miles (68 km) away.

=== Climate ===
Climate data for Norwich, New York (1991–2020 normals, extremes 1906–present)
Month	Jan	Feb	Mar	Apr	May	Jun	Jul	Aug	Sep	Oct	Nov	Dec	Year
Record high °F (°C)	66 (19)	74 (23)	86 (30)	92 (33)	94 (34)	98 (37)	101 (38)	100 (38)	99 (37)	88 (31)	80 (27)	66 (19)	101 (38)
Mean maximum °F (°C)	54.3 (12.4)	54.0 (12.2)	65.7 (18.7)	79.2 (26.2)	86.7 (30.4)	90.2 (32.3)	90.5 (32.5)	88.8 (31.6)	86.3 (30.2)	77.9 (25.5)	67.9 (19.9)	56.8 (13.8)	92.5 (33.6)
Mean daily maximum °F (°C)	31.5 (−0.3)	33.9 (1.1)	42.7 (5.9)	56.5 (13.6)	68.9 (20.5)	77.1 (25.1)	81.1 (27.3)	79.4 (26.3)	72.5 (22.5)	60.1 (15.6)	47.4 (8.6)	36.5 (2.5)	57.3 (14.1)
Daily mean °F (°C)	21.7 (−5.7)	22.8 (−5.1)	31.3 (−0.4)	44.2 (6.8)	55.7 (13.2)	64.7 (18.2)	68.8 (20.4)	67.4 (19.7)	60.2 (15.7)	48.6 (9.2)	37.4 (3.0)	28.2 (−2.1)	45.9 (7.7)
Mean daily minimum °F (°C)	11.8 (−11.2)	11.7 (−11.3)	19.9 (−6.7)	31.9 (−0.1)	42.5 (5.8)	52.3 (11.3)	56.6 (13.7)	55.3 (12.9)	47.9 (8.8)	37.1 (2.8)	27.4 (−2.6)	19.9 (−6.7)	34.5 (1.4)
Mean minimum °F (°C)	−10.7 (−23.7)	−7.4 (−21.9)	0.4 (−17.6)	18.9 (−7.3)	29.0 (−1.7)	38.4 (3.6)	46.2 (7.9)	44.6 (7.0)	34.6 (1.4)	24.9 (−3.9)	13.5 (−10.3)	0.9 (−17.3)	−13.4 (−25.2)
Record low °F (°C)	−32 (−36)	−29 (−34)	−19 (−28)	3 (−16)	20 (−7)	29 (−2)	35 (2)	27 (−3)	20 (−7)	11 (−12)	−8 (−22)	−31 (−35)	−32 (−36)
Average precipitation inches (mm)	3.18 (81)	2.73 (69)	3.51 (89)	3.80 (97)	3.59 (91)	4.95 (126)	4.38 (111)	4.42 (112)	4.02 (102)	3.88 (99)	3.22 (82)	3.59 (91)	45.27 (1,150)
Average snowfall inches (cm)	17.8 (45)	17.4 (44)	14.7 (37)	2.3 (5.8)	0.0 (0.0)	0.0 (0.0)	0.0 (0.0)	0.0 (0.0)	0.0 (0.0)	0.3 (0.76)	5.6 (14)	16.7 (42)	74.8 (190)
Average precipitation days (≥ 0.01 in)	17.5	14.4	14.9	14.9	14.3	12.9	13.2	12.5	11.8	14.5	15.0	17.3	173.2
Average snowy days (≥ 0.1 in)	12.6	9.9	7.6	1.9	0.0	0.0	0.0	0.0	0.0	0.5	4.6	10.1	47.2
Source: NOAA

== Economy ==
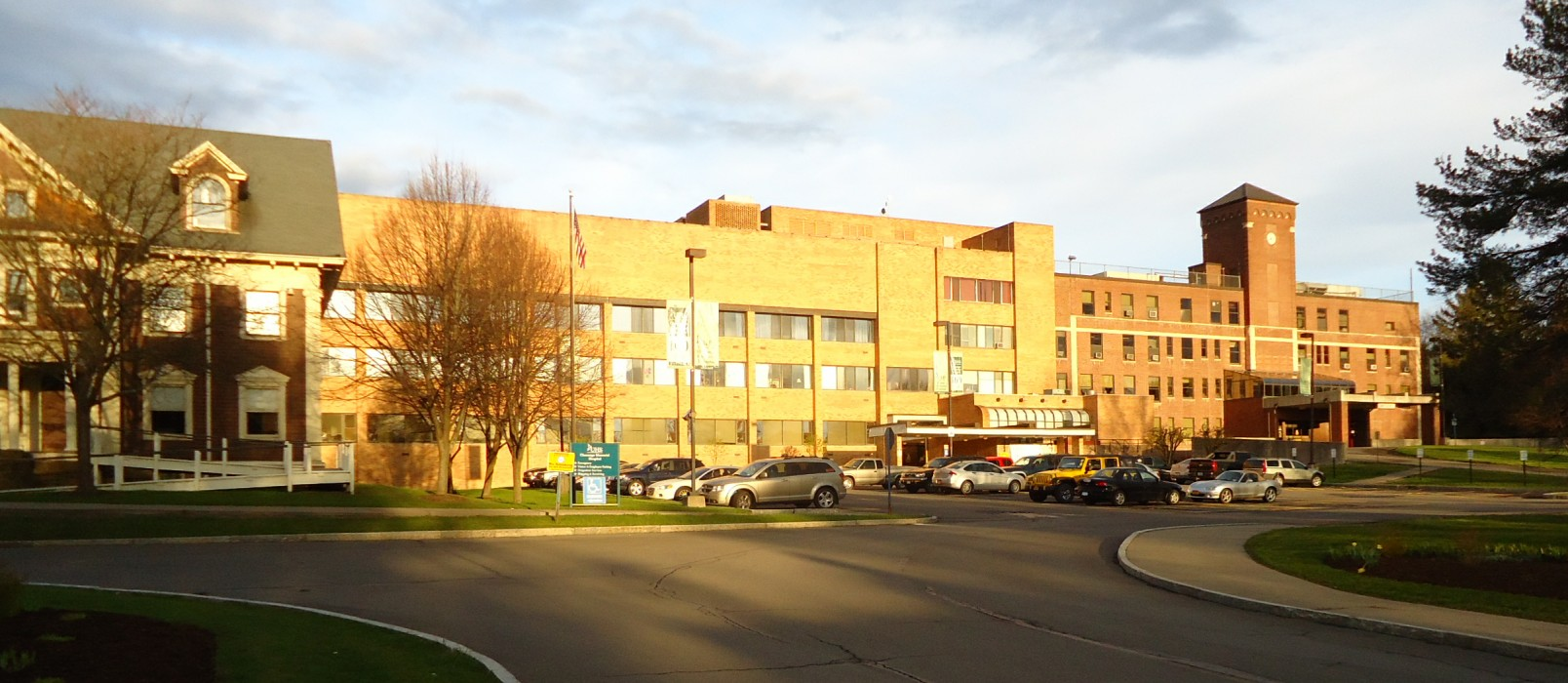
Chenango Memorial Hospital is a major employer in the city.

For nearly a century, the city had important manufacturing firms. It was the corporate headquarters of the Norwich Pharmacal Company. Formed in 1887 as a partnership between Reverend Lafayette Moore and Oscar G. Bell, a drug store employee, the company grew to become a major developer and manufacturer of medicines and veterinary products, known for its Unguentine antiseptic dressing (introduced in 1893) and Pepto-Bismol, an upset-stomach and anti-diarrhea medication (introduced in 1901 under a different name).

The company merged with Morton International, Inc. in 1969 and later became a subsidiary of Procter & Gamble in 1982. Under corporate restructuring, Procter & Gamble divided the company into several units, each of which was subsequently sold. This caused the loss of many jobs in Norwich, resulting in the city struggling to figure out a new economic model.

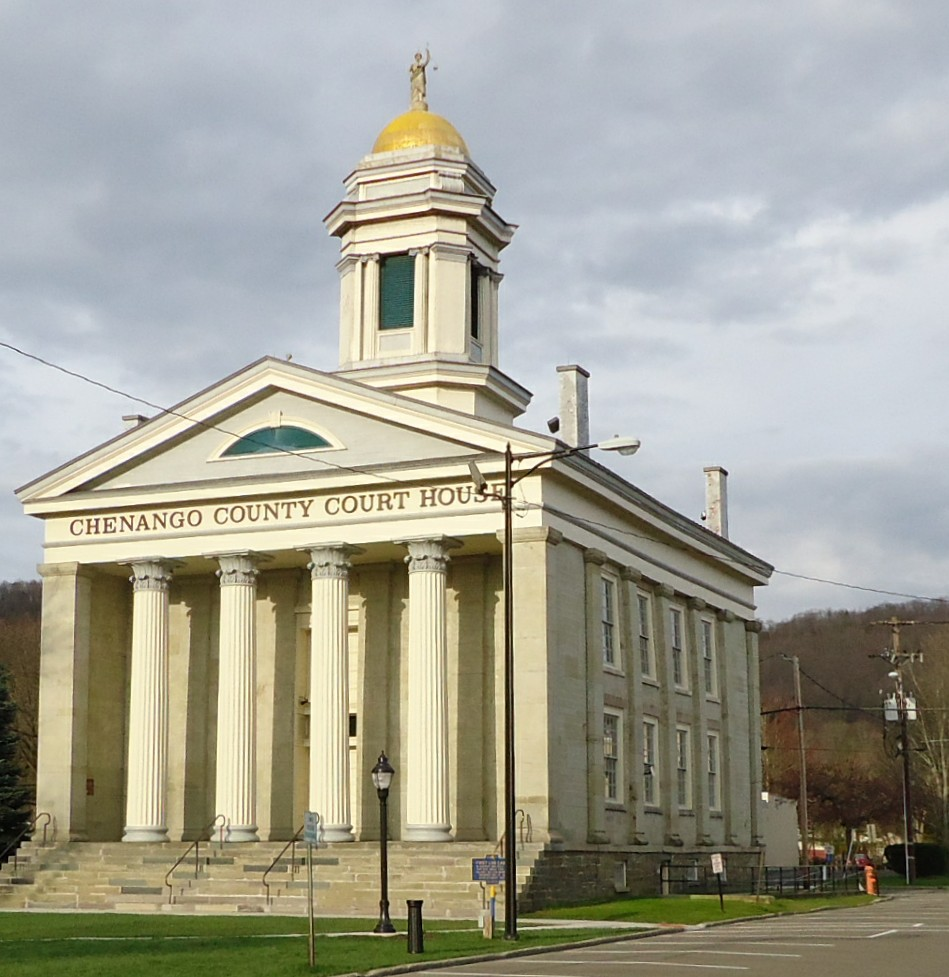
Chenango County Courthouse

In 1996, a new plant of Dan Wesson Firearms was built in Norwich and the company moved there from Massachusetts; It became a subsidiary of CZ-USA in 2005 and therefore a Colt CZ Group subsidiary since 2022.

From 1845 until 1961, Norwich was also the home of the Maydole Hammer Factory. The founder, David Maydole, was an enterprising blacksmith who set out to create a hammer with a safely attached head. His hammers proved so successful that Maydole had become the largest hammer manufacturer in the United States by the time of its founder's death in 1892.

The Chenango Canal, the New York, Ontario and Western Railway, and the Delaware, Lackawanna and Western Railroad (later Erie-Lackawanna) once served most of the city's transportation needs. The NYO&W ceased operations on March 29, 1957. Until June 2006, the community was served by the New York, Susquehanna and Western Railroad, which operated trains on the old DL&W line between Binghamton and Utica. That service ended in 2011, the result of flood damage between Sangerfield and Chenango Forks. Following a major renovation, the line resumed freight service in May, 2017.

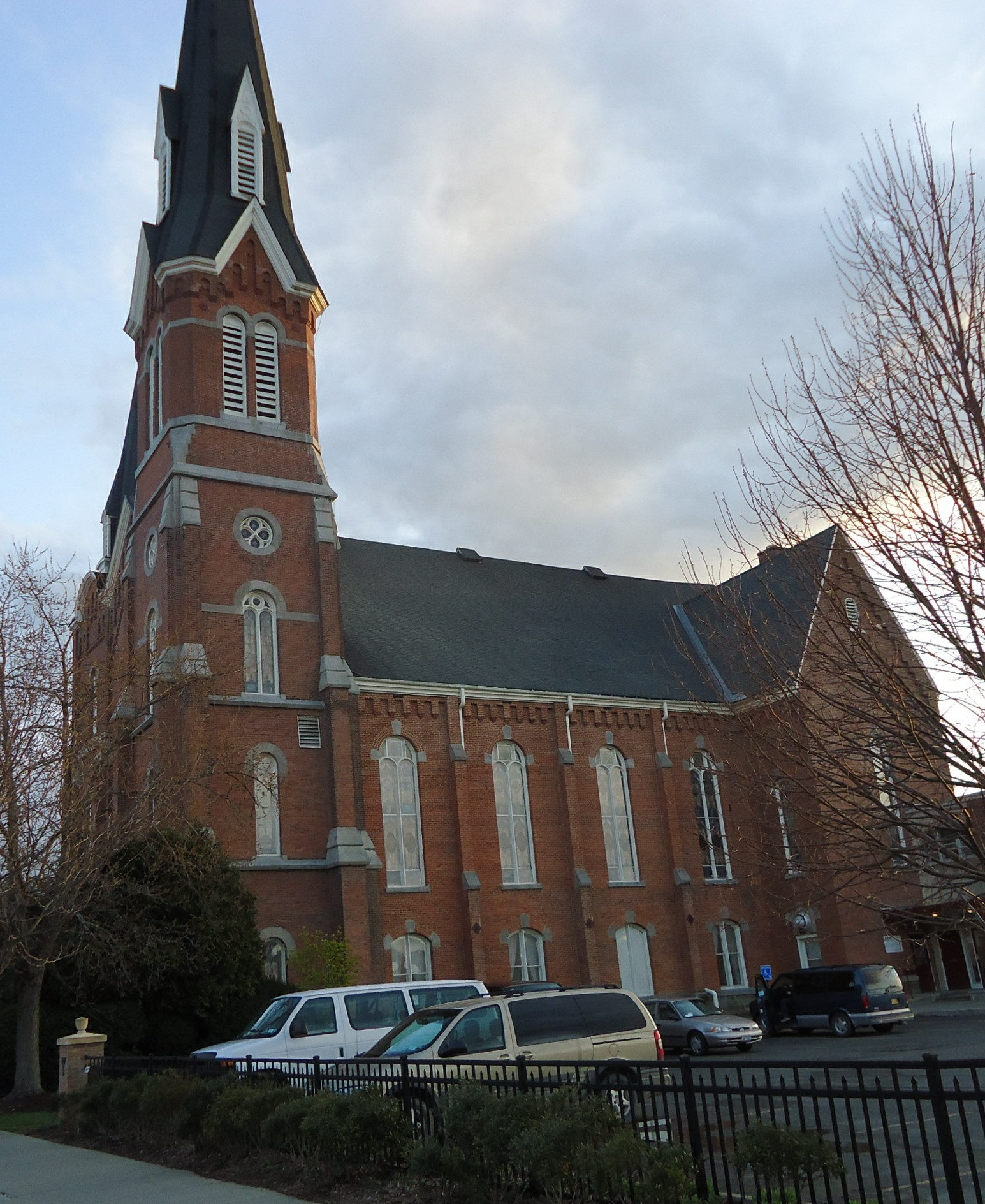
Broad Street United Methodist Church

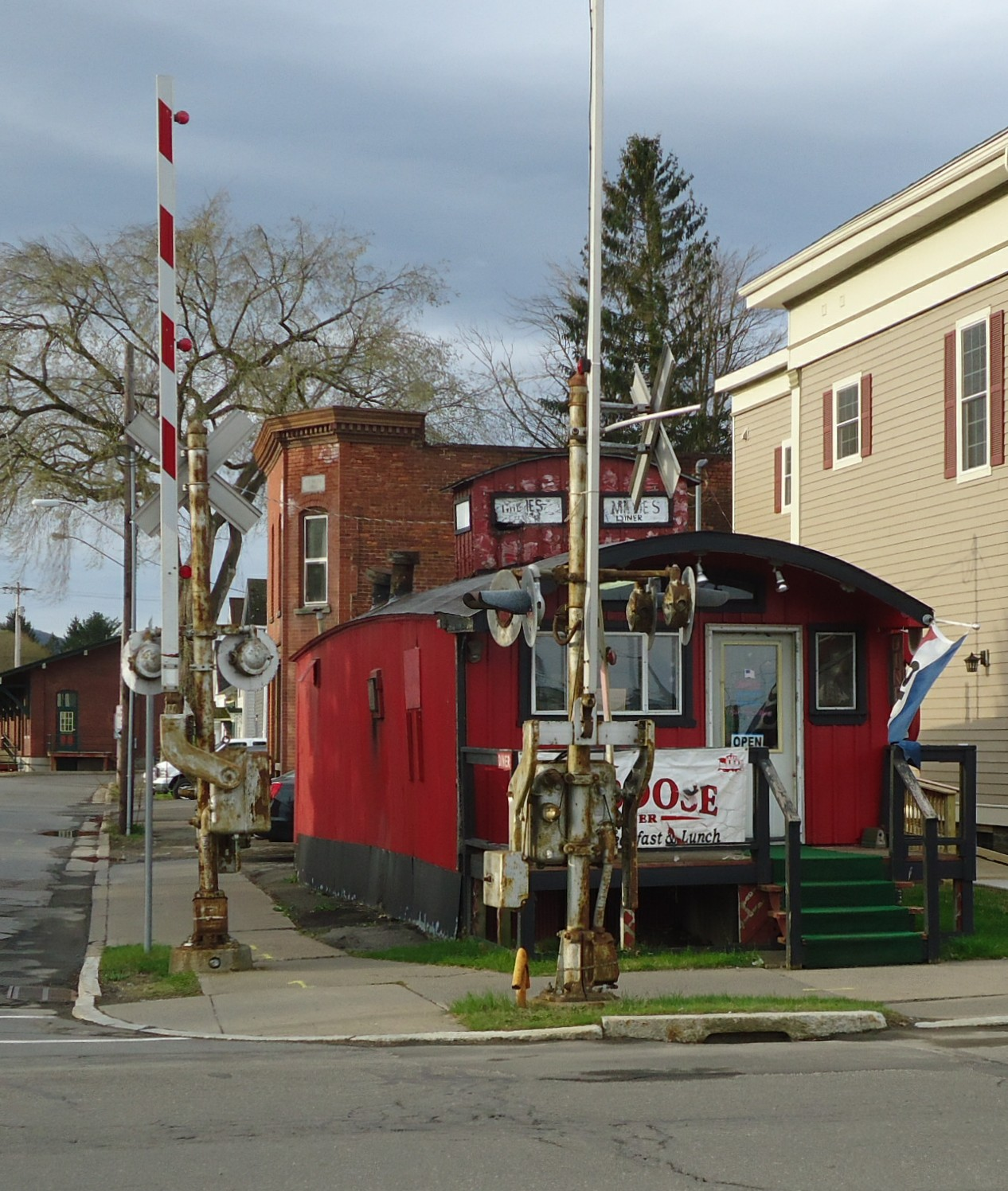
Retired train caboose converted into a diner

A new $8 million campus was constructed for the city's small extension of Morrisville State College. Due to loss of jobs in the area, population has declined, affecting both admissions and attendance at the college in recent years.

NBT Bancorp and Chobani are both headquartered in Norwich.

Route 12 bisects the city on a north–south axis, becoming North and South Broad Street within city limits. A community of downtown businesses is found along it. On the north side of town lies the North Plaza, desolate since the departure of anchor tenant Jamesway, and a commercial strip of gas stations and fast food outlets. To the south are three plazas just outside city limits, featuring supermarkets, gas stations, fast food, Lowe's and Walmart.

Norwich residents usually travel to the larger nearby cities of Oneonta, Binghamton, Utica, sometimes Cortland, and occasionally the much larger metropolitan areas of Syracuse and Albany, for goods and services unobtainable locally.

== Demographics ==
Historical population
Census	Pop.	Note	%±
1890	5,212		—
1900	5,766		10.6%
1910	7,422		28.7%
1920	8,268		11.4%
1930	8,378		1.3%
1940	8,694		3.8%
1950	8,816		1.4%
1960	9,175		4.1%
1970	8,843		−3.6%
1980	8,082		−8.6%
1990	7,613		−5.8%
2000	7,355		−3.4%
2010	7,190		−2.2%
2020	7,051		−1.9%
U.S. Decennial Census

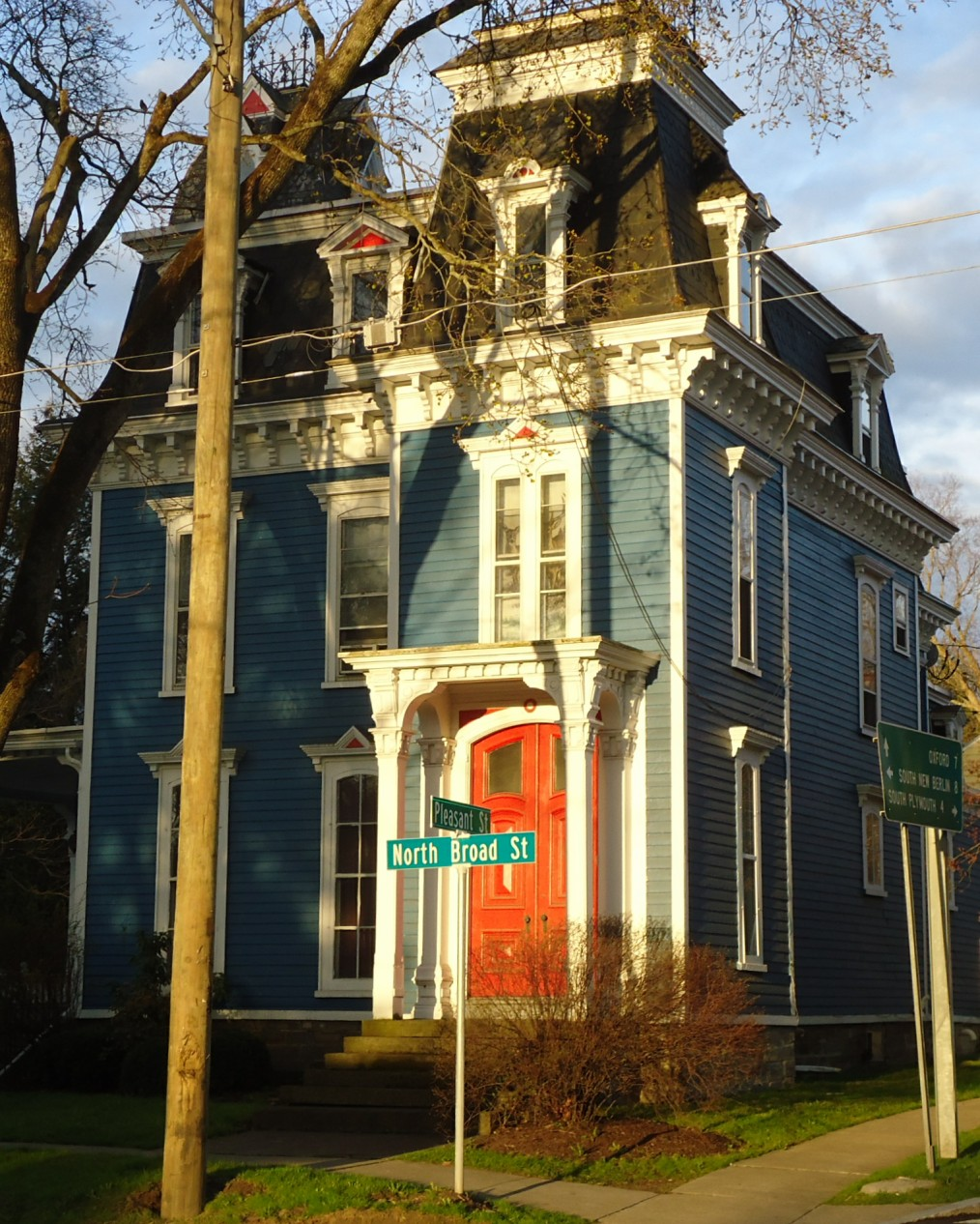
A house along a main street

As of the census of 2000, there were 7,355 people, 3,131 households, and 1,671 families residing in the city. The population density was 3,609.0 inhabitants per square mile (1,393.4/km^{2}). There were 3,500 housing units at an average density of 1,717.4 per square mile (663.1/km^{2}). The racial makeup of the city was 96.48% White, 1.39% Black or African American, 0.27% Native American, 0.69% Asian, 0.19% from other races, and 0.98% from two or more races. Hispanic or Latino of any race were 0.68% of the population.

There were 3,131 households, out of which 28.6% had children under the age of 18 living with them, 35.6% were married couples living together, 13.4% had a female householder with no husband present, and 46.6% were non-families. 40.2% of all households were made up of individuals, and 19.0% had someone living alone who was 65 years of age or older. The average household size was 2.19 and the average family size was 2.95.

In the city, the population was spread out, with 24.6% under the age of 18, 8.2% from 18 to 24, 26.1% from 25 to 44, 20.0% from 45 to 64, and 21.2% who were 65 years of age or older. The median age was 39 years. For every 100 females, there were 78.9 males. For every 100 females age 18 and over, there were 75.0 males.

The median income for a household in the city was $28,485, and the median income for a family was $39,808. Males had a median income of $33,537 versus $24,430 for females. The per capita income for the city was $17,339. About 14.7% of families and 18.7% of the population were below the poverty line, including 28.5% of those under age 18 and 9.2% of those age 65 or over.

== Culture ==
Museums include the Chenango County Historical Society and the Northeast Classic Car Museum, which houses over 160 classic cars, including the world's largest collection of Franklin automobiles.

== Notable people ==
- Joe Angelino, member of the New York State Assembly
- Ruth Fulton Benedict, anthropologist
- Gail Borden, inventor and dairy pioneer
- Bonnie Campbell, attorney and politician in Iowa
- Edward J. Erickson, retired U.S. Army officer and historian
- William M. Fenton, former Lt. Governor of Michigan
- Clarence D. Rappleyea Jr., attorney and member of the New York State Assembly
- Lillian Belle Sage, educator and scientist
- Harry Stack Sullivan, psychiatrist
- John Prindle Scott, composer
- Hamdi Ulukaya, founder of Chobani Yogurt
- Jessamine S. Whitney, statistician

== Gallery ==
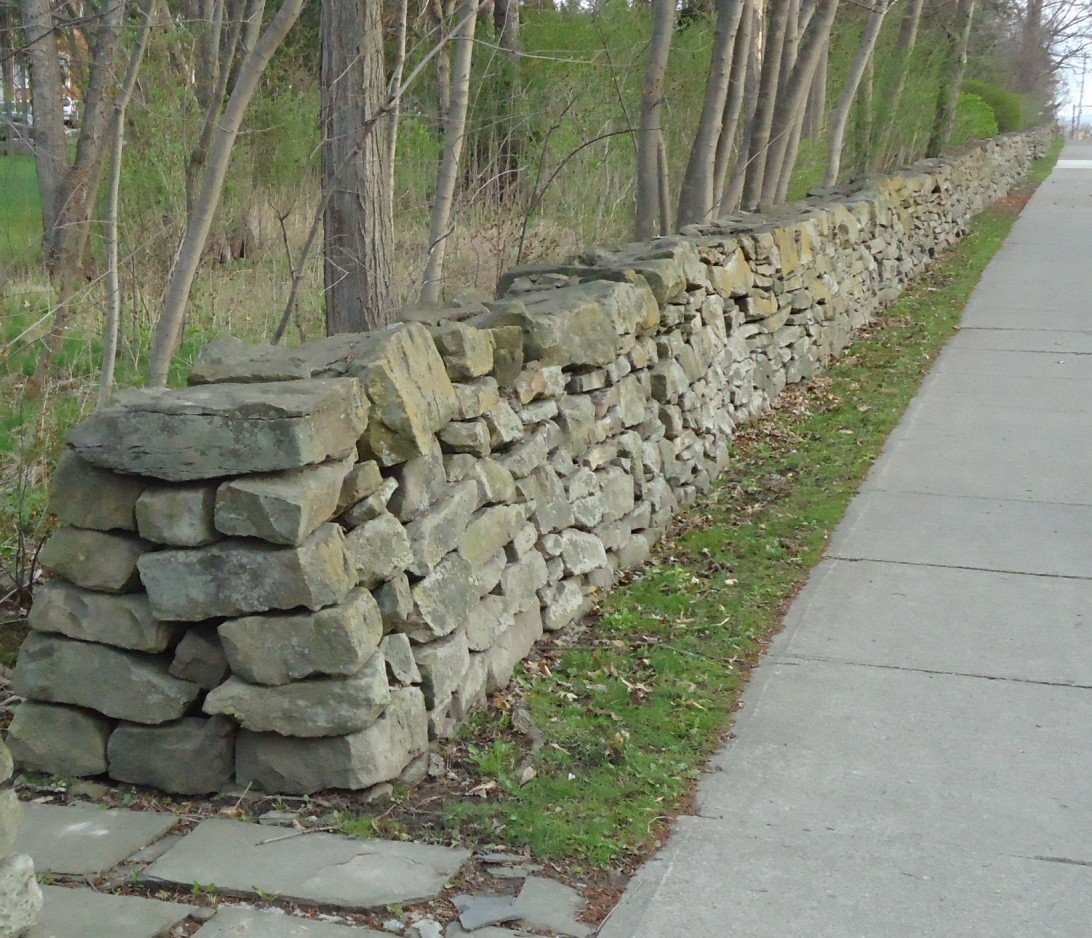
Rock wall

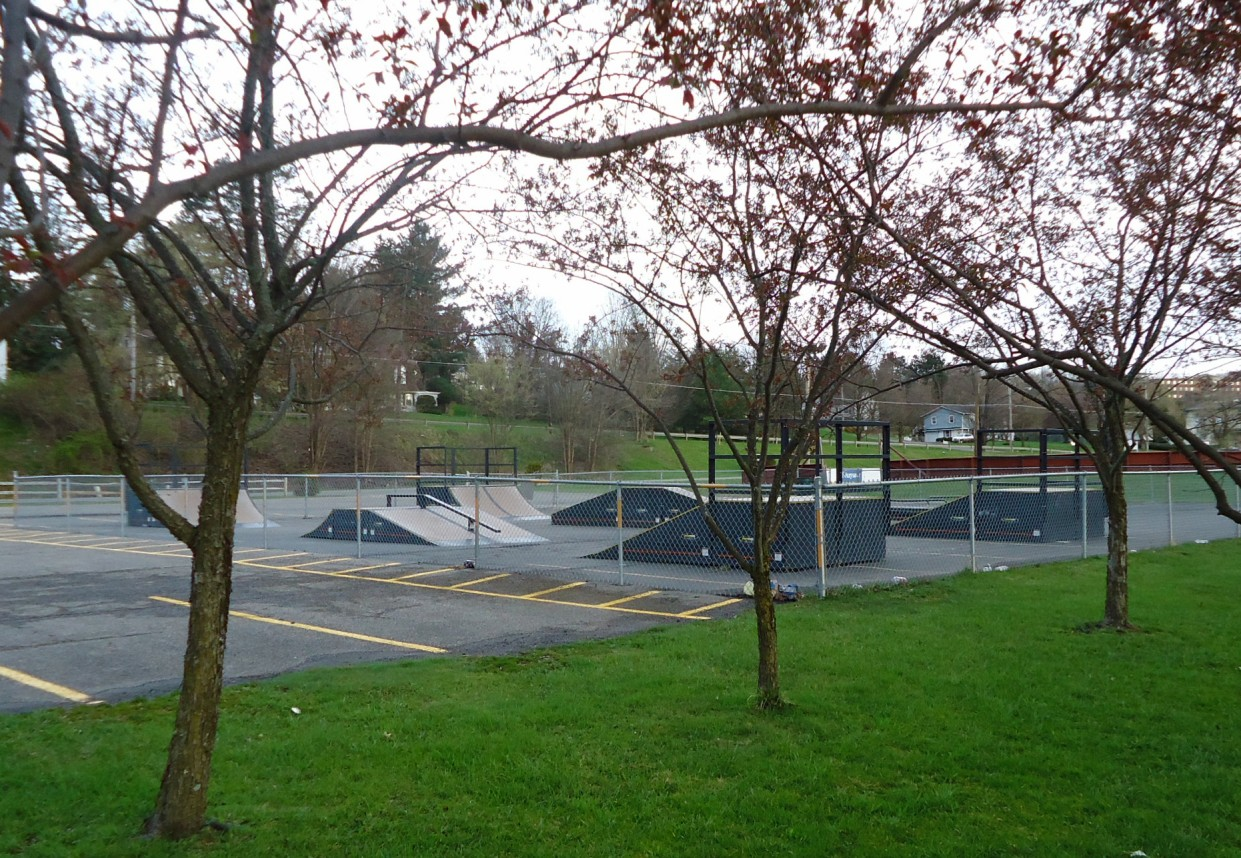
Skateboard park

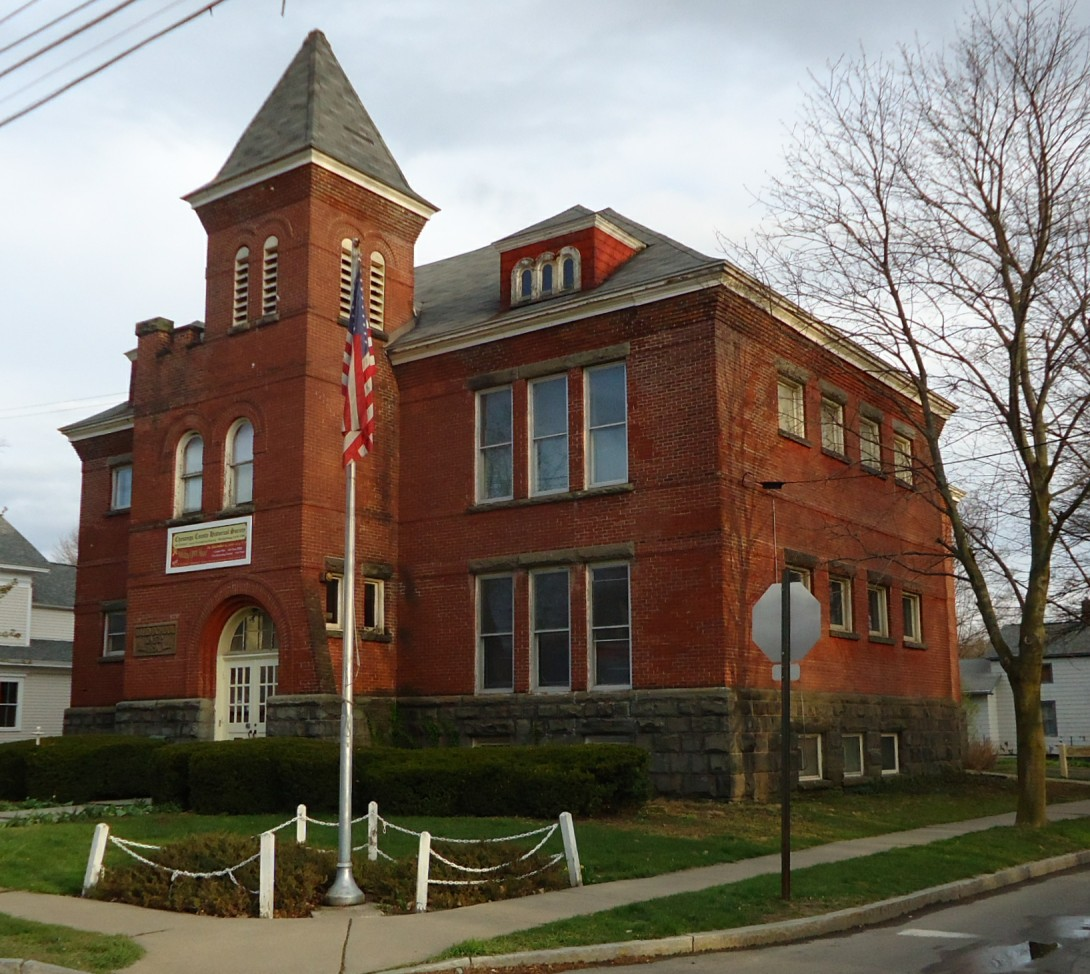
Historical society

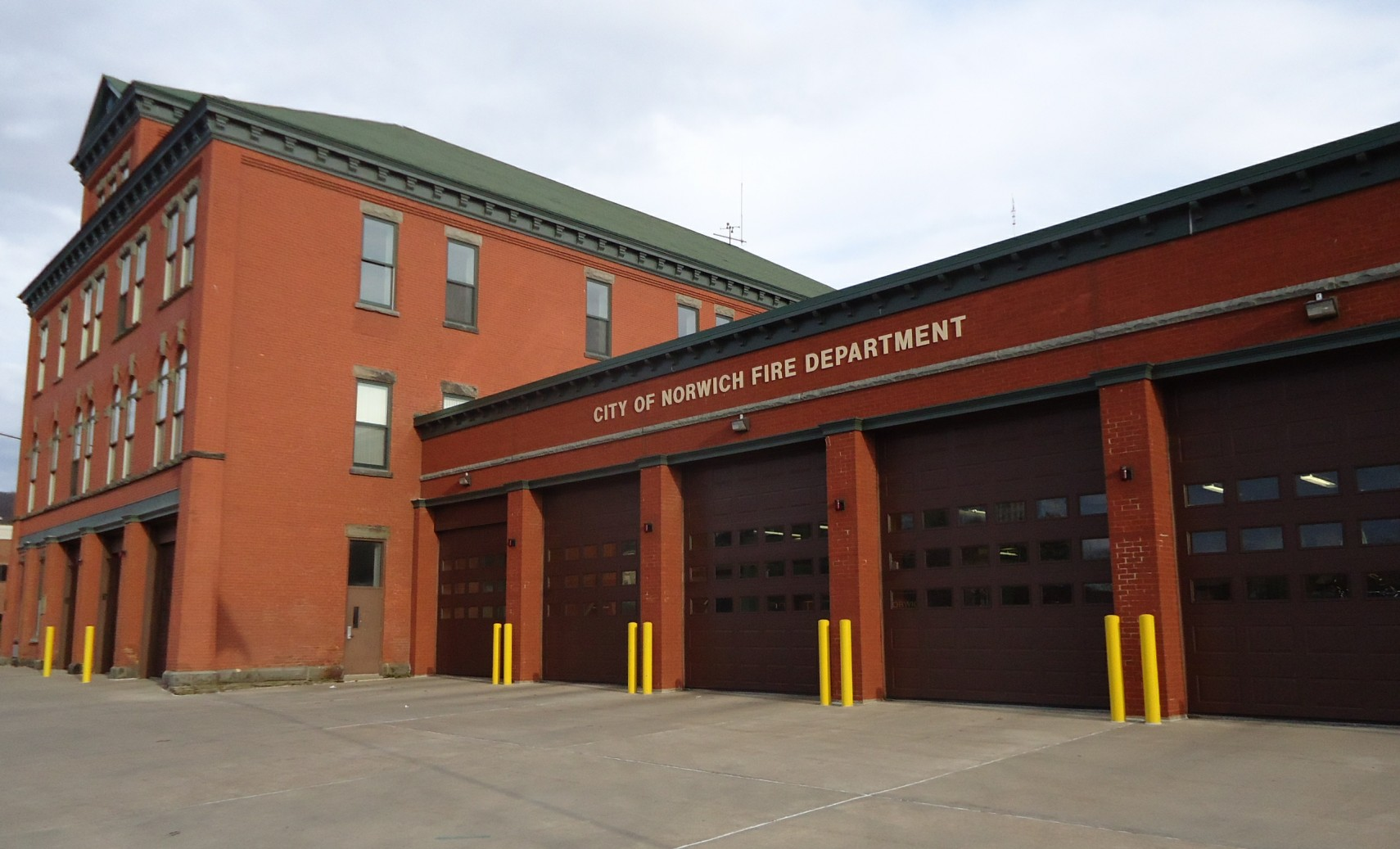
Fire station

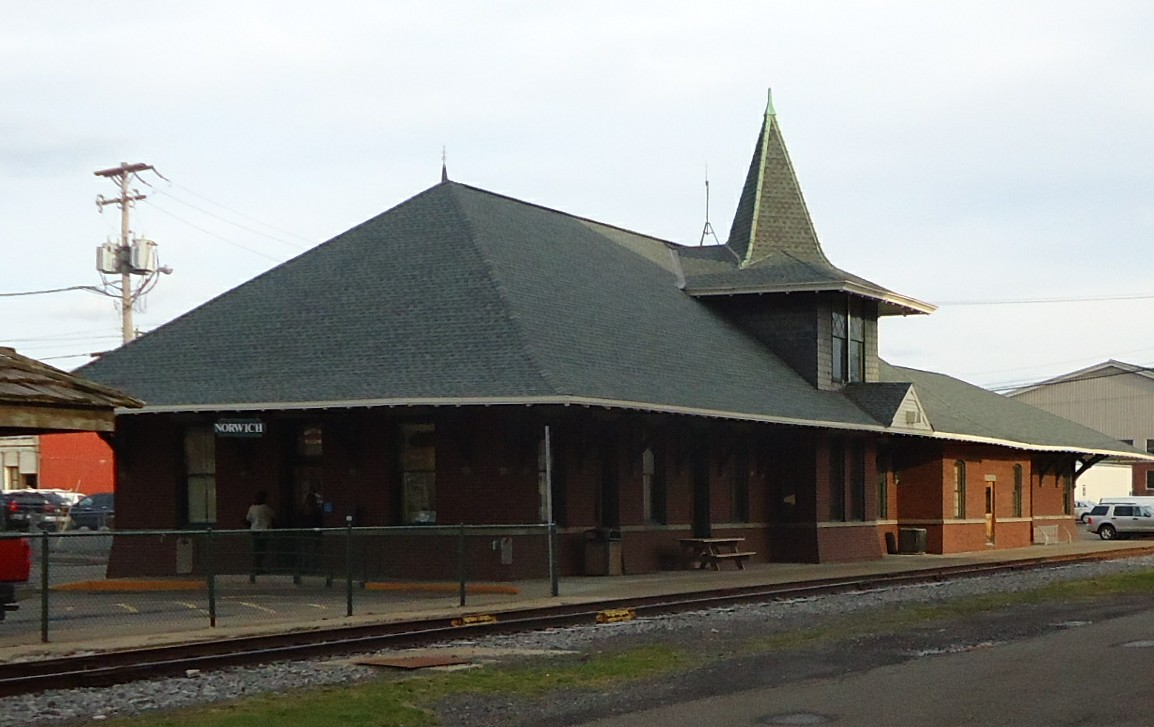
Train station

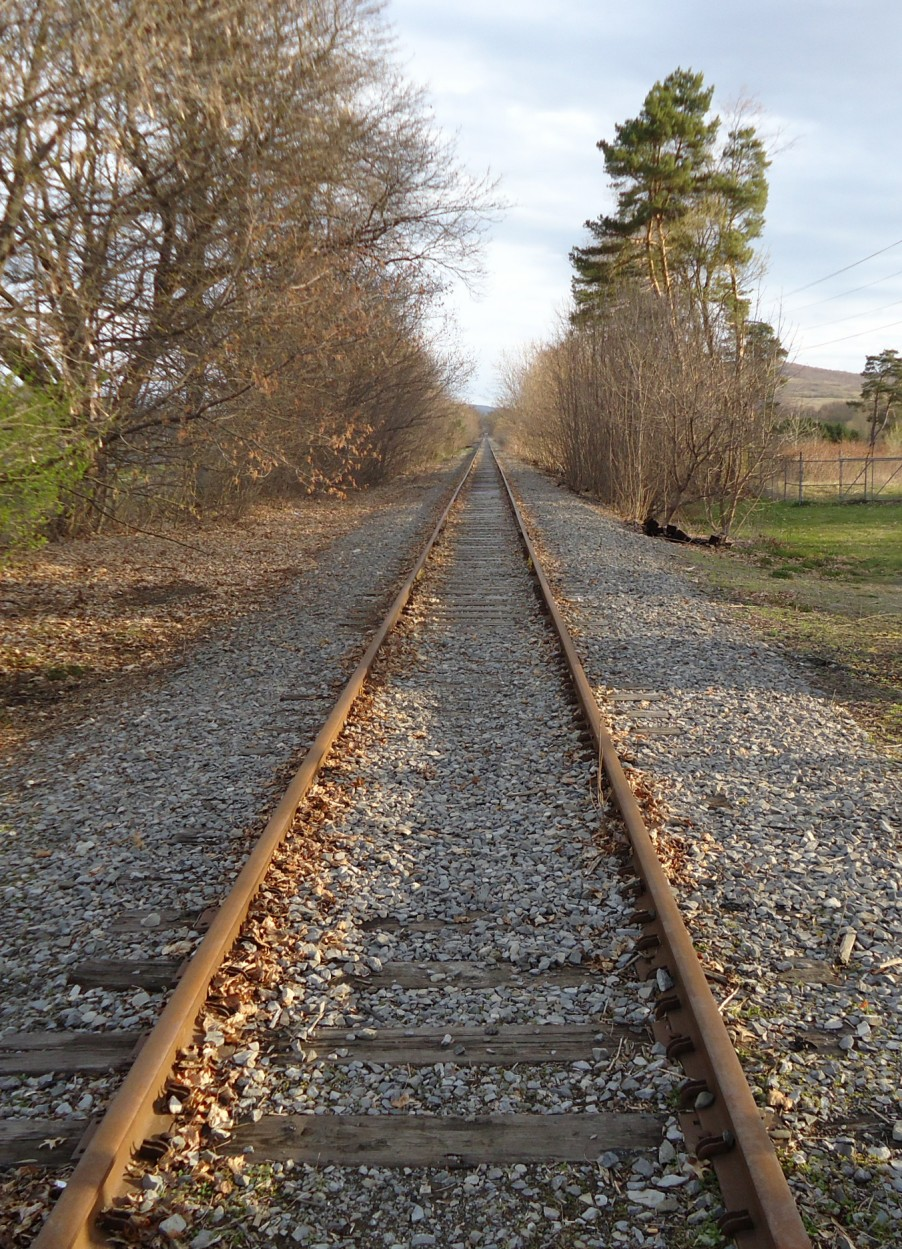
Train tracks

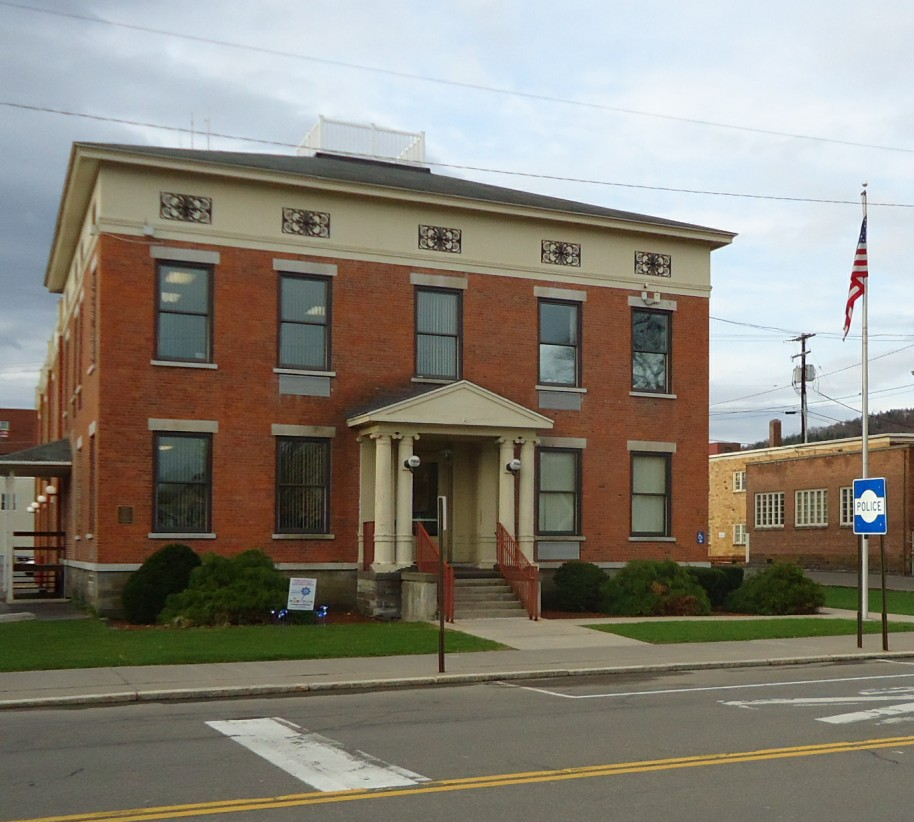
Police station

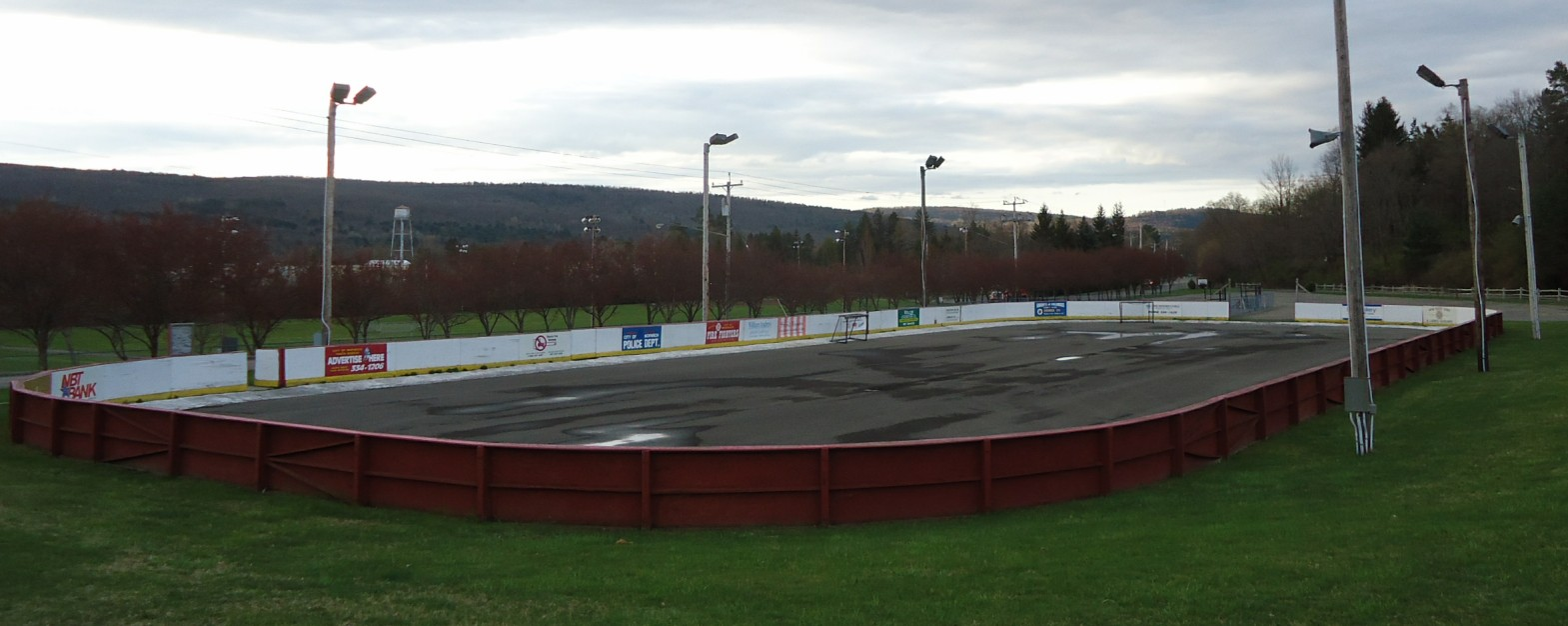
Ice skating rink

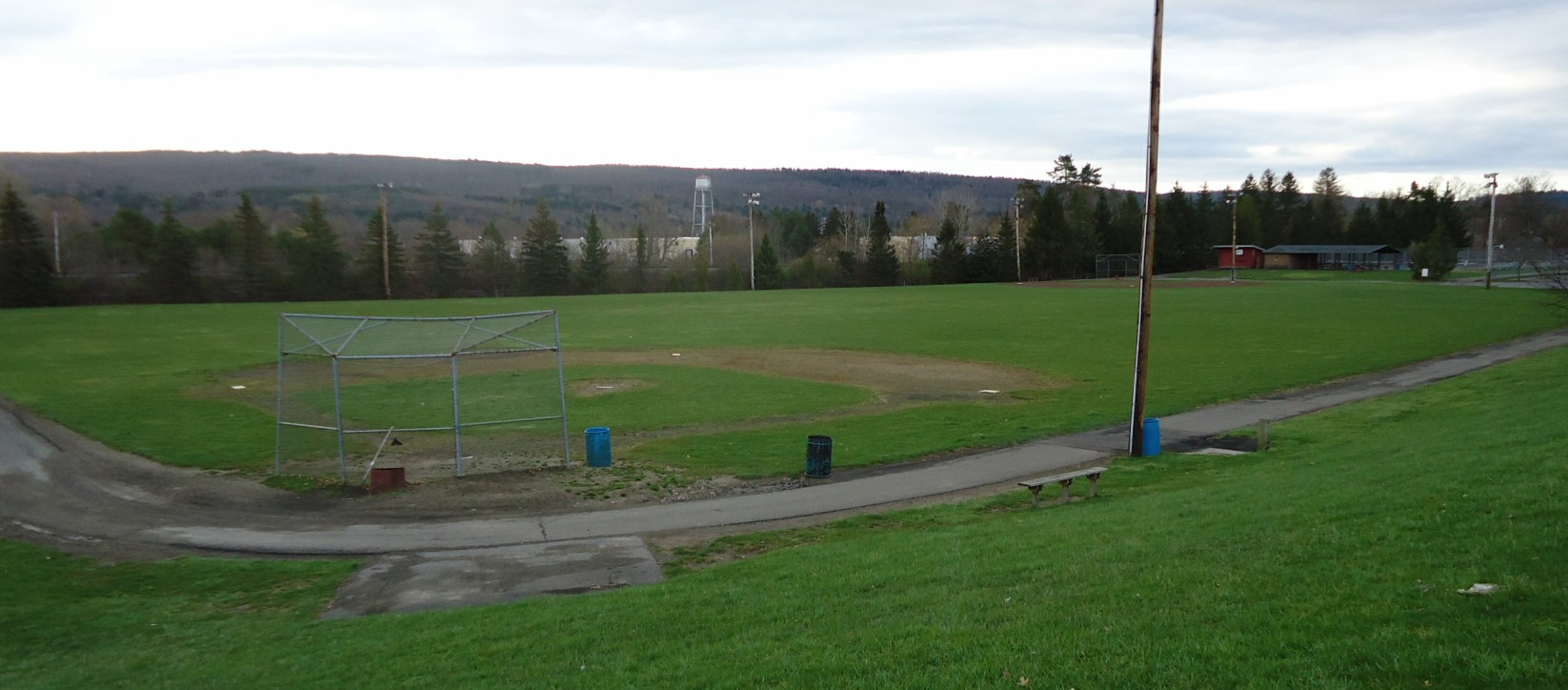
Baseball field

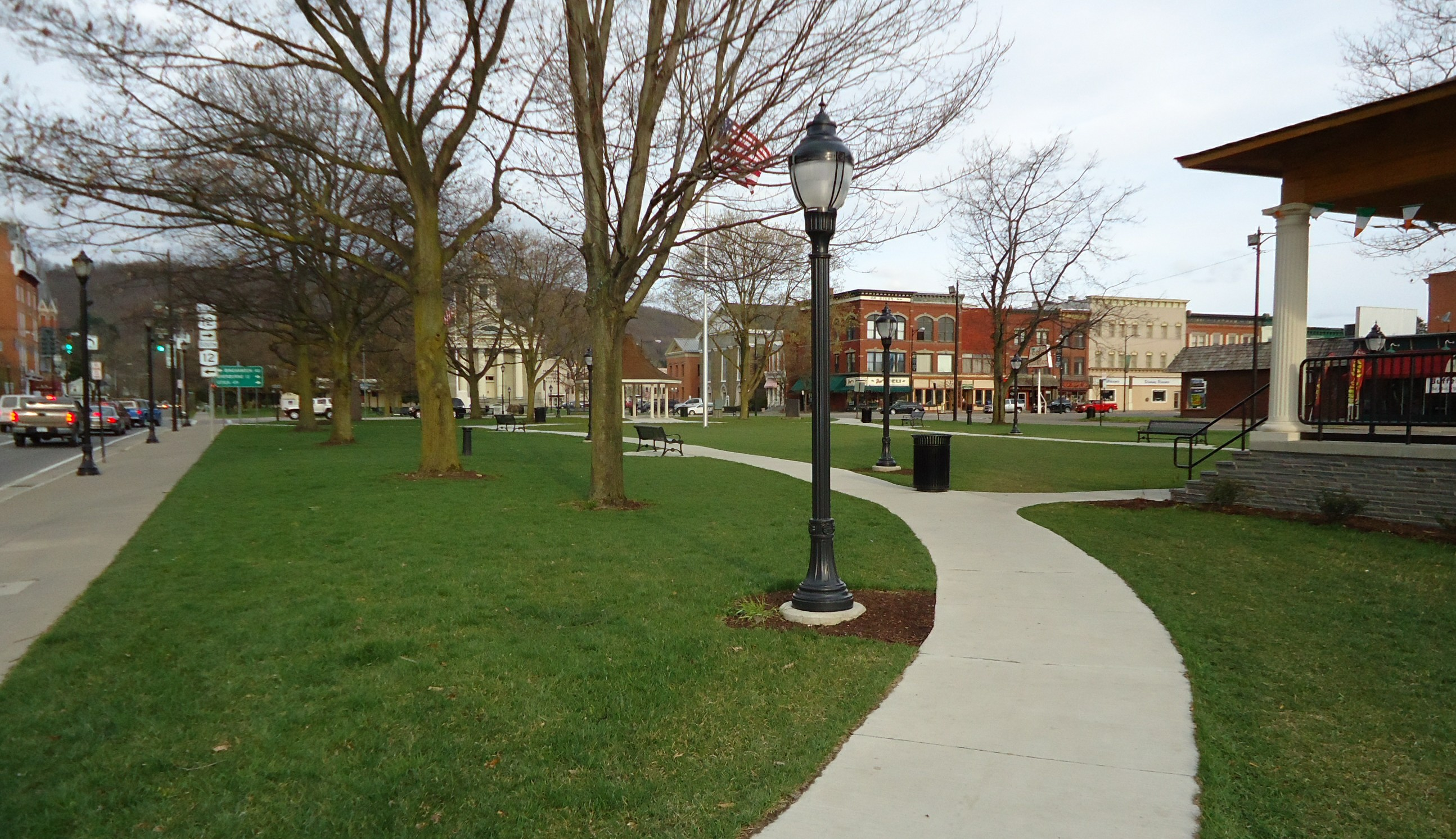
Town green
