= John Prindle Scott =

American author, lecturer, educator and composer of art songs

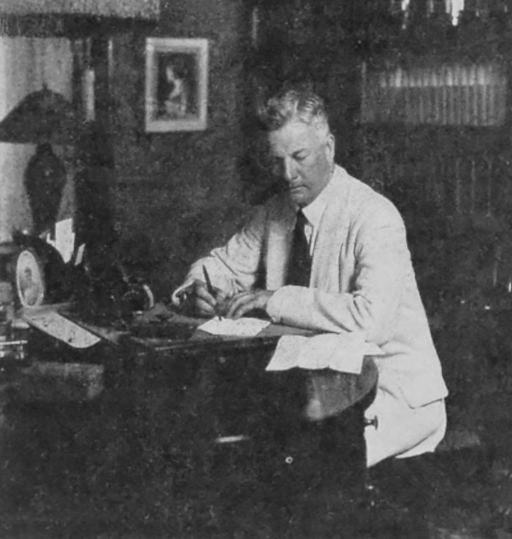
- Born: August 16, 1877; Norwich, New York, US
- Died: December 2, 1932 (aged 55); Syracuse, New York, US
- Education: Oberlin College
- Occupations: Writer, educator, composer

John Prindle Scott (August 16, 1877 – December 2, 1932) was an American author, lecturer, educator and composer of art songs.

== Biography ==
He was born in Norwich, New York, and was educated with private tutors in New York City and at Oberlin College in Ohio, where he was enrolled as a music student from 1896–1900, and moved to New York city before 1908. Later he was a voice teacher in Saginaw, Michigan. He was also known as a singer (baritone) and concert soloist. According to an article in the Syracuse American, "He had established a considerable reputation in concert work when he was forced by increasing deafness to turn to composition for musical expression."

For his 1916 setting of "Hymn to Nebraska," the state of Nebraska awarded him a prize in composition. He also won a composition prize from Ohio University. He became a member of ASCAP in 1928.

He spent a few summers in McDonough, New York, before purchasing a house there in 1922, calling his home the "Scottage". A couple of his songs and poems refer to the town, including "The Old Road" and "The Hills O' McDonough".

He spent time with relatives in Syracuse, New York, where he died in December 1932.

== Music ==
John Prindle Scott composed about 60 published songs between 1910 and 1930, including several prominent sacred works which have remained in the repertoire, especially "Come, Ye Blessed." Alan J. Ord mentioned "Come, Ye Blessed" as a good song for bass voices, calling it "ardent, with a flowing line". Scott's song for high soprano, "The Wind's in the South", is considered a "good teaching piece for young coloratura [sopranos]". His songs are typical of their time: dramatic, harmonically rich, and with full accompaniments. They often feature contrasting sections and a return to earlier musical material.

== Musical compositions ==
=== Sacred songs for voice and piano ===
- Arise, Shine, Sacred Song (Biblical Book of Isaiah), R. L. Huntzinger, 1923
- Christ Is Risen, Easter Song (unknown author), Harold Flammer, 1920
- Come, Ye Blessed (Biblical Gospel of Matthew), G. Schirmer, 1917
- Consider the Lilies (Biblical Gospel of Matthew), G. Schirmer, 1921
- Death Triumphant (text by the composer), R. L. Huntzinger, 1922
- Depart from Me, sacred song (unknown author), Harold Flammer, 1919
- The First Easter Morn (based on biblical Luke 24), hymn tune by Charles Wesley, G. Schirmer, 1923
- Following the Star, a Christmas Song (unknown author), G. Schirmer, 1919
- God of Our Fathers (D. Roberts), Harold Flammer, 1917
- He Maketh Wars to Cease (Biblical Psalm 46), Harold Flammer, 1918
- He Shall Give His Angels Charge (Biblical Psalm 103), R. L. Huntzinger, 1918
- I know in Whom I have Believed (Biblical books of Second Timothy and Malachi), W. Maxwell Music Co, 1913, Theodore Presser, 1920
- If Ye Love Me John 14), R. L. Huntzinger, 1922
- Jerusalem the Golden (unknown author), Harold Flammer, 1918
- Light's Glittering Morn, Easter Solo (unknown author), G. Schirmer, 1921
- Like as a Father (Biblical Psalm 91), G. Schirmer, 1922
- The Lord is My Shepherd (Biblical Psalm 23), G. Schirmer, 1922
- Out of the Depths (Biblical Psalm 130), R. L. Huntzinger, 1918
- The Promised Land (unknown author), R. L. Huntzinger, 1919
- Repent Ye (Biblical Matthew 3: 1,2,7,8,11,12), G. Schirmer, 1917
- The Revelation (unknown author), Theodore Presser, 1918
- Ride On! Ride On! A sacred song (unknown author), Theodore Presser, 1918
- There is a Land of Pure Delight (Isaac Watts), Flammer, 1919
- They that Trust in the Lord (unknown author), G. Schirmer, 1921
- Three Sacred Songs, Harold Flammer, 1918
1. Remember Now Thy Creator (unknown author)
2. The Messenger of Peace (unknown author)
3. Come, Ye Thankful People Come (unknown author)
- Sun of My Soul (Hymn text by J. Keble), Harold Flammer, 1918
- The Trumpet Shall Sound (unknown author), Harold Flammer, 1921
- Trust Ye in the Lord (Biblical Book of Isaiah), Huntzinger & Dilworth/Willis Music, 1917
- Two Sacred Songs, Huntzinger & Dilworth/Willis Music, 1921
1. When I Consider the Heavens (Biblical Psalm 8)
2. Even Song (Rev. A. P. Upperby), with violin obbligato
- The Voice in the Wilderness (Biblical Book of Isaiah), Huntzinger & Dilworth/Willis Music, 1916

=== Secular songs for voice and piano ===
- At the Donnybrook Fair (unknown author), Theodore Presser, 1916
- The Dearest Place (Claire Wallace Flynn), Huntzinger & Dilworth, 1918
- The False Prophet, or The Lying Little Daisy (Reginald V. Darow), R. L. Huntzinger/Willis Music, 1922
- Good Luck, Mister Fisherman (text by the composer), R. L. Huntzinger, 1922
- Green, An Irish Song (M. E. Blake), G. Schirmer, 1923
- Holiday (text by the composer), G. Schirmer, 1922
- In Canturbury Square (Reginald V. Darow), Theodore Presser, 1923
- John O'Dreams (T. Garrison), W. Maxwell Music Co, 1913
- Love is a Riddle (text by the composer), R. L. Huntzinger, 1928
- My True Love Lies Asleep (Lizette Woodworth Reese), Theodore Presser, 1915
- Old Bill Bluff (text by the composer), Huntzinger & Dilworth, 1917
- The Old Road: Song of Wandering (Reginald V. Darow), G. Schirmer, 1920
- Romeo in Georgia (text by the composer), Huntzinger & Dilworth, 1919
- A Sailor's Love Song (text by the composer), W. Maxwell Music Co, 1912
- The Secret (Robert Fullerton), John Church Co., 1910
- The Shadows of the Evening Hours.
- The Spray o' Heather (Stephen Chalmers), G. Schirmer, 1921
- To an Old Love (text by the composer), G. Schirmer, 1919[16]
- Trelawny (R. S. Hawker), Theodore Presser, 1917
- Two Songs, G. Schirmer, 1921
1. One Gave Me a Rose (unknown author)
2. The Maid of Japan (Reginald V. Darow)
- Virginia: Waltz Ballad (Dorothy E. Borchers), Los Angeles: W.A. Quincke & Co., 1932
- The Wind's in the South (text by the composer), Huntzinger & Dilworth/Willis Music, 1916
- Young Alan the Piper (unknown author), Theodore Presser, 1917

=== Songs for voice and organ ===
- Light, A Sacred Song (text by the composer), G. Schirmer, 1919
- The Promised Land (unknown author), Huntzinger & Dilworth, 1919
- There were Shepherds, Christmas song (Luke 2:8–15), Harold Flammer, 1917

=== Piano solo ===
- Two Irish Sketches, Theodore Presser, 1916–17, published 1918
1. The top o' the Mornin' (also arranged for piano duet)
2. At the Donnybrook Fair (also arranged for piano duet)
- Dennis and Norah (Irish Sketches, no. 3), Theodore Presser, 1917

=== Other works ===
- Angels, Roll the Rock Away, Easter anthem for mixed voices and soprano or tenor solo, R. L. Huntzinger, 1930
- Even Song, voice, violin, and piano (Rev. A. P. Upperby), see Two Sacred Songs above
- Five Oberlin Songs, 1906
- He Maketh Wars to Cease, SAB chorus and organ, arr. Wallingford Riegger (Biblical Psalm 46), Harold Flammer, 1944
- Nocturne, medium voice, violin, 'cello, and piano, G. Schirmer, 1920
- O Haste the Day when Wars Shall Cease!, a hymn (text by Rev. A. A. Toms, Harold Flammer, 1918
- O Little Town of Bethlehem, Christmas song, voice, violin, and piano (text "from the Hymnal"), Harold Flammer, 1920
- Romeo in Georgia, male voices, R. L. Huntzinger/Willis Music, 1938
- School songs for Ohio University.
- Two school songs for Lincoln College, "Evening Hymn" and "Won't You Come Along?", 1920?
- The Voice in the Wilderness, mixed voices and organ, R. L. Huntzinger/Willis Music, 1928
- The Wind's in the South, SSA, R. L. Huntzinger/Willis Music, 1929
