= Kate Papert =

American labor economist (1902-1977)

- Papert, from the 1924 yearbook of Barnard College
- Born: July 31, 1902; New York, New York, U.S.
- Died: April 29, 1977 (aged 74); New York, New York, U.S.
- Occupations: Labor economist, government official

Kate Papert (July 31, 1902 – April 29, 1977) was an American economist and state labor official based in New York. As director of the state's Division of Women in Industry, took particular interest in addressing child labor, the minimum wage, and women workers during World War II.

== Early life and education ==
Papert was born in New York City, the daughter of Solomon Papert and Rose Papert. Both of her parents were Jewish immigrants from the Russian Empire; her father ran a dry goods store. She graduated from Washington Irving High School and attended Barnard College for three years, but earned her bachelor's degree in economics from the University of Wisconsin. She stayed at Wisconsin for graduate studies under John R. Commons.

Her sister Ruth Papert was a clothing designer, poet, and composer, who campaigned against DDT and for organic gardening.

== Career ==
Papert worked in the Division of Statistics at the New York State Department of Labor, and became chief of the department's Bureau of Research. In 1938, she was appointed acting director of the department's Division of Women in Industry and Minimum Wage. "In her 11 years in the New York labor department she organized and directed some of the most extensive and important research projects handled by the division," explained a 1938 report of her appointment. She became the director of the division by 1942, when she published a report on a rise in child labor in the state.

In 1942, Papert was appointed to a new commission, chaired by Kathryn H. Starbuck, organized to set state law and policy around women in war work. The whole commission resigned in 1943, because they felt their expertise and recommendations were ignored. In 1944 she spoke on a panel about child labor and juvenile delinquency. In 1945, she spoke at an event concerning agricultural labor and migrant workers, and at a roundtable urging that retraining and counseling programs be established for women displaced from jobs after the war effort. Her division continued to study women war workers after 1945 but the Bureau of Women in Industry was a target of smaller government efforts by 1948.

Papert was a member of the American Association of University Women (AAUW) and of the Women's Trade Union League (WTUL). By 1961 she was a consultant studying national cost-of-living trends.

== Publications ==
- "Maintaining Child Labor Standards in Wartime" (1943, Occupations)

== Personal life ==
Papert died in 1977, in New York City, at the age of 74, survived by three of her sisters and her "dearest friend" Dorothy O'Brien.
