= Lt. Warren Eaton Airport =

Airport in New York, United States

Lt. Warren Eaton Airport Lt. Warren E. Eaton Airport
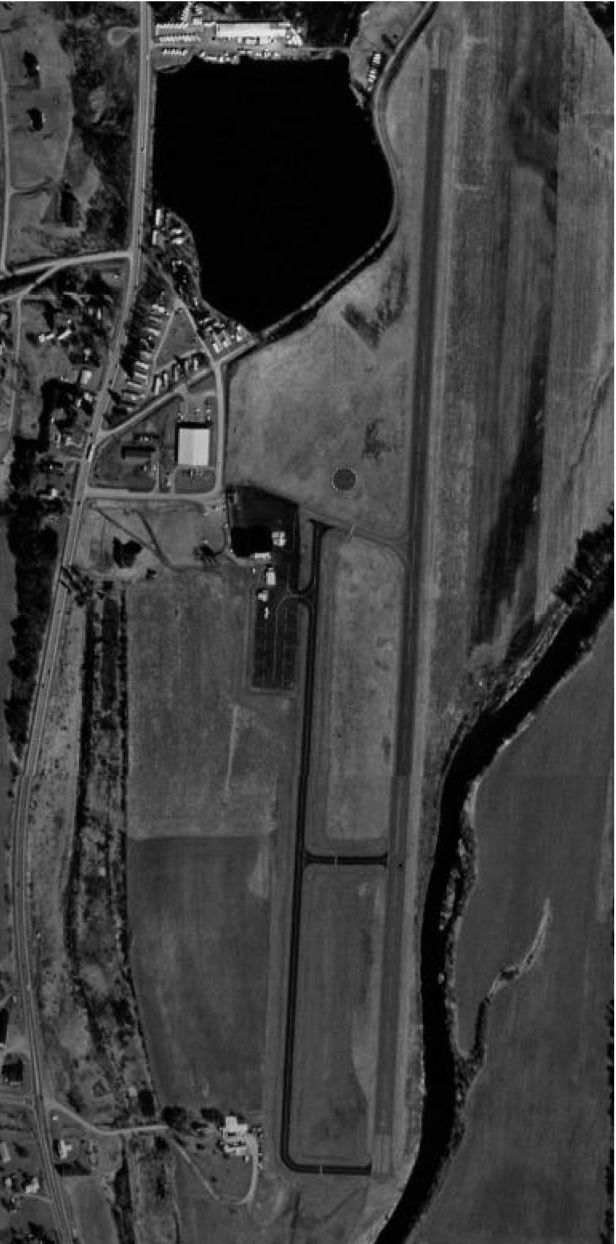
- 1995 orthophoto from USGS
- IATA: OIC; ICAO: KOIC; FAA LID: OIC

Summary
- Airport type: Public
- Owner: Chenango County
- Serves: Norwich, New York
- Elevation AMSL: 1,025 ft / 312 m
- Coordinates: 42°33′59″N 075°31′27″W
- Website: LtWarrenEatonAirport.us
- Interactive map of Lt. Warren Eaton Airport

Runways
Direction	Length		Surface
Direction	ft	m	Surface
1/19	4,724	1,440	Asphalt

Statistics (2011)
- Aircraft operations: 17,300
- Based aircraft: 11
- Source: Federal Aviation Administration

Lt. Warren Eaton Airport (IATA: OIC, ICAO: KOIC, FAA LID: OIC), also known as Lt. Warren E. Eaton Airport, is a county-owned public-use airport in Chenango County, New York, United States. It is located two nautical miles (4 km) north of the central business district of Norwich, New York. It was established on June 17, 1952.

This airport is included in the National Plan of Integrated Airport Systems for 2011–2015, which categorized it as a general aviation facility. The airport has no scheduled commercial operations, but PrivatAir operates flights to Cincinnati for Procter & Gamble employees.

Lt. Warren Eaton(1888-1934) was the first president of The Soaring Society of America.

== Facilities and aircraft ==
Lt. Warren Eaton Airport covers an area of 147 acres (59 ha) at an elevation of 1,025 feet (312 m) above mean sea level. It has one runway designated 1/19 with an asphalt surface measuring 4,724 by 75 feet (1,440 x 23 m).

For the 12-month period ending August 9, 2017, the airport had 17,300 aircraft operations, an average of 47 per day: 81% general aviation, 18% air taxi, and 1% military. At that time there were 14 aircraft based at this airport: 93% single-engine, 7% multi-engine, 0% jet, and 0% ultralight.

== See also ==
- List of airports in New York
