= Friedrich Beer =

Austrian-French sculptor

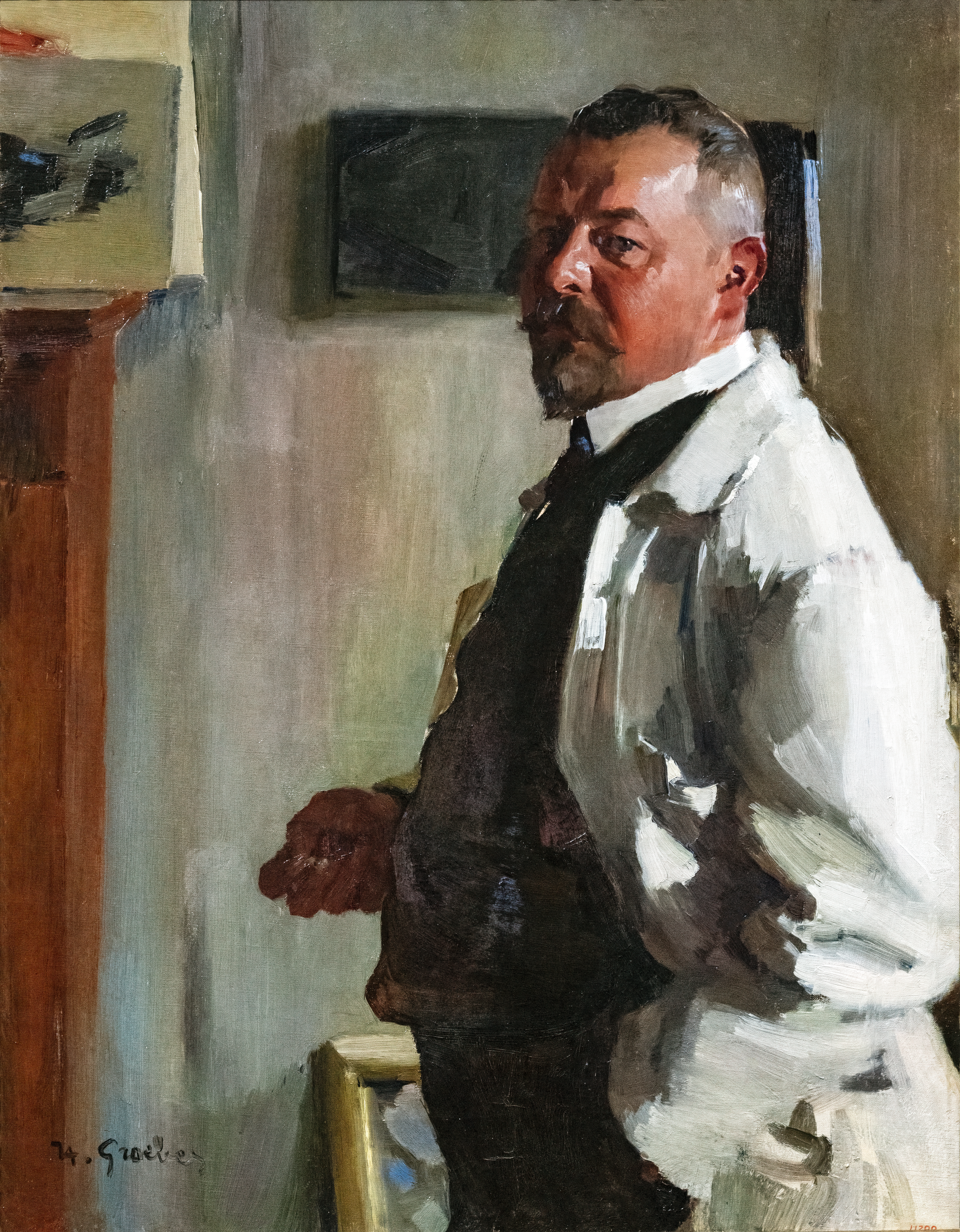
Friedrich Beer by Hermann Groeber

Friedrich Salomon Beer (1 September 1846 – 18 October 1912) was an Austrian-French sculptor.
