= Florence Wells Slater =

American entomologist (1864–1941)

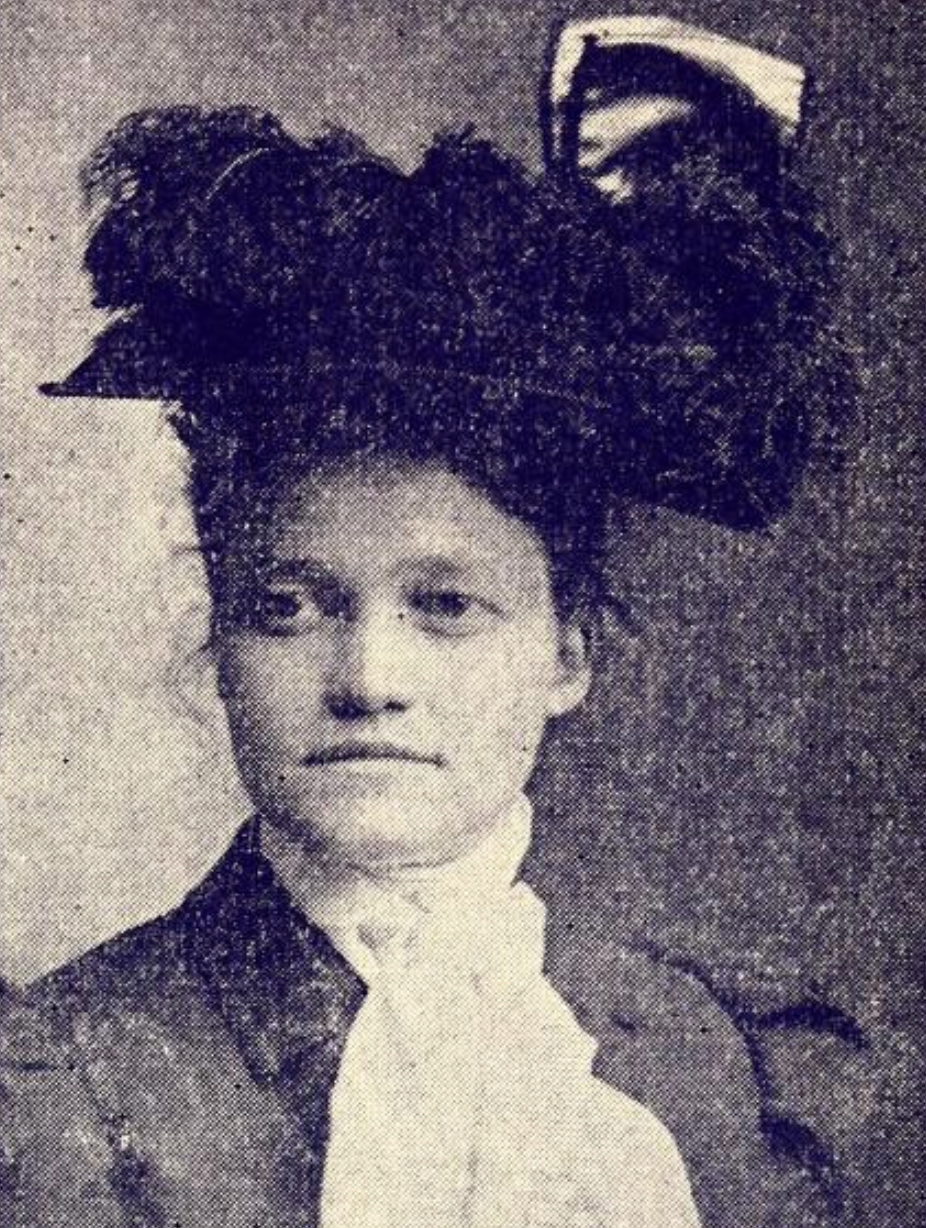
- Slater in 1896
- Born: October 16, 1864; Salisbury, North Carolina, U.S.
- Died: January 22, 1941; Winston-Salem, North Carolina, U.S.
- Resting place: Salem Cemetery
- Education: St. Mary's School
- Alma mater: Cornell University
- Occupation(s): entomologist, schoolteacher
- Parent: James Alexander Slater (father)

Mary Florence Wells Slater (October 16, 1864 – January 22, 1941) was an American entomologist and educator. After graduating from St. Mary's School in 1882, she served on the faculty there as a science teacher. Slater went on to study entomology at Cornell University, working as a research assistant for John Henry Comstock. In 1899 she published the article The Egg-Carrying Habitat of Zaitha, which made corrections to an error in Comstock's earlier published work. She went on to teach within the New York City Department of Education, most notably at Washington Irving High School in Gramercy Park. Slater was an advocate for teacher pensions in New York and for equal pay for equal work in the United States.

== Biography ==
Mary Florence Wells Slater was born in Salisbury, North Carolina on October 16, 1864. Her father was James Alexander Slater. Slater was the sister of Ada Slater Carter, James H. Slater, and Henry Fielding Slater. She enrolled at St. Mary's School, an Episcopal girls' boarding school in Raleigh, in 1877. She graduated from St. Mary's in 1882 and became a faculty member there in 1883, teaching botany and natural sciences.

In 1885, Slater attended Cornell University, where she was a member of Sigma Xi and the Wayside Club. While an undergraduate student, she studied and worked under John Henry Comstock. While working with Comstock in 1899, she reported in an article titled The Egg-Carrying Habit of Zaitha that male Zaitha flumineum carry eggs and that the females are "obliged to capture the male in order to deposit the eggs", corrected an error made by Comstock that had been published in American textbooks. She also wrote that "the male chafes under the burden" of carrying the eggs and "if attacked, he meekly receives the blows, seemingly preferring death.. to the indignity of carrying and caring for the eggs." Slater graduated from Cornell with a Bachelor of Science degree in 1900.

Upon graduating, Slater moved to New York City, teaching science in city public schools, most notably Washington Irving High School. While teaching at Washington Irving, she would borrow slides from the American Museum of Natural History and animals from the Bronx Zoo for her lectures. Every month, she would arrange for a member of the American Museum of Natural History's Department of Education to lecture to the entire 5,000-person student body in the school auditorium.

Slater was an advocate for equal pay for equal work and for adopting a pension system for teachers in New York public schools. When she retired from teaching, she was granted a pension that allowed her to remain financially independent for the remainder of her life. She moved back to North Carolina and guest lectured around the state. Jane Simpson McKimmon attended one of her guest lectures, at the North Carolina State College, where she lectured to six hundred and twenty-three students from rural North Carolina on a reel of film titled How Life Begins.

Slater was a parishioner and bible study teacher at St. Paul's Episcopal Church in Winston-Salem.

She died on January 22, 1941, and is buried at Salem Cemetery.
