= NBT Bank =

American financial institution

NBT Bancorp Inc.
- Type: Public
- Traded as: Nasdaq: NBTB; S&P 600 Component; Russell 2000 Component
- Industry: Finance
- Founded: 1856; 170 years ago
- Founder: Warren Newton Isaac Newton James H. Smith
- Headquarters: Norwich, New York, United States
- Number of locations: 170+ branches
- Key people: Martin A. Dietrich, Chairman Scott A. Kingsley, (president & CEO)
- Products: Financial services, commercial banking
- Net income: ▲US$53.0 M (Q2 2026)
- Total assets: ▲US$16.21 B (Q2 2026)
- Total equity: ▲US$1.94 B (Q2 2026)
- Number of employees: 2,385 (as of June 30, 2026)
- Website: nbtbank.com

NBT Bank, N.A. is an American financial institution that operates through a network of 176 banking locations in New York, Pennsylvania, Vermont, Massachusetts, New Hampshire, Maine and Connecticut. NBT Bank and its parent company, NBT Bancorp Inc., are headquartered in Norwich, New York, United States. NBT Bancorp is traded on the Nasdaq Global Select Market under the symbol NBTB.

== History ==
Founded in 1856 by Warren Newton (former contractor for the Erie and Chenango canals), Isaac Newton (Warren's brother), and James H. Smith (NBT Bank's first President), NBT Bank was first a state-chartered bank called the Bank of Norwich. The bank's first board meeting was held on March 3, 1856 at the law office of Warren and Isaac Newton. The bank opened for business on July 15, 1856 in a storefront on South Main Street.

On June 28, 1865, the bank received a national charter (which it holds to this day) and changed its name to the National Bank of Norwich. In 1918, NBT Bank was one of the first national banks in New York State to apply for and receive trust powers under a Federal Reserve Act and established a Trust Department. In 1925, NBT Bank changed its name a second time to better reflect its expanded services. Over the years, the area served by NBT Bank expanded and in 1989 the bank changed its name for the third time to The National Bank and Trust Company without "of Norwich." In 1995, the bank changed its name for the fourth time to NBT Bank, N.A. (The "N.A." stands for "National Association" and is used primarily in formal or legal contexts.) At the same time, NBT Bank introduced its current logo featuring a blue star and red lettering.

In 2016, NBT Bank celebrated its 160th year in business and published an updated history of the bank to commemorate this milestone.

== Mergers and acquisitions ==
NBT Bank completed its first acquisitions in the 1930s. Since that time, the bank has continued to grow through bank and branch acquisitions as well as through organic expansion.

Since 2000, NBT Bank acquired the following banks: LA Bank based in Scranton, Pennsylvania in 2000; Pioneer American Bank based in Carbondale, Pennsylvania in 2000; First National Bank of Northern New York based in Norfolk, New York in 2001; Central National Bank based in Canajoharie, New York in 2001; City National Bank and Trust Company based in Gloversville, New York in 2005; Hampshire First Bank based in Manchester, New Hampshire in 2012; and Alliance Bank based in Syracuse, New York in 2013. The merger with Alliance Bank was completed on March 8, 2013 and is NBT Bank's largest to date. In December 2022, NBT announced that it will acquire the Connecticut-based Salisbury Bancorp in an equity transaction valued at $204 million. The deal for Salisbury Bancorp closed in August 2023 for $204 million and Salisbury Bank President and CEO Richard J. Cantele Jr. was named to the NBT Bank board of directors and executive management team. NBT acquired Evans Bank of Williamsville, NY on May 2, 2025. The merger extended NBT’s branch network into the Western Region of New York with the addition of 14 banking offices in the Buffalo area and 4 locations in greater Rochester.

== Naming rights ==
NBT Bank owns the naming rights to NBT Bank Stadium in Syracuse, New York, and NBT Bank Arena at the Utica Memorial Auditorium in Utica, New York.
