= Norwich Pharma Services =

American pharmaceutical company

- Company type: Wholly owned subsidiary
- Industry: Pharmaceutical
- Founded: 1887; 139 years ago (as Norwich Pharmaceuticals)
- Headquarters: Norwich, New York, Illinois, United States
- Products: Pharmaceutical products
- Website: www.norwichpharma.com

Norwich Pharma Services, previously known as Norwich Eaton Pharmaceuticals, Norwich Pharmacal, and Norwich Pharmaceuticals, is a manufacturer, packager, and distributor of prescription drugs and over-the-counter products. Laboratory support services include stability evaluation, microbiological testing, analytical testing and method development. The company was formed in 1887.

== History ==
The Norwich Pharmaceutical Company was established in Norwich, New York, in 1887. In 1893, Norwich introduced Unguentine to the medical profession as the first antiseptic surgical dressing. The company’s mixture called Cholera Infantum, later renamed Pepto-Bismol, appeared for the first time in 1901. Its principal use was for infants with severe diarrhea. In 1907, Acetylsalicylic acid (aspirin) tablets were added to the company’s product line. In 1939, Norwich Pharmaceutical stock was listed on the New York Stock Exchange.

During World War II, the company earned the Army-Navy ‘E’ Award with four added stars in recognition of its support of the troops and war effort. In 1982, the company, then called Norwich Eaton Pharmaceuticals, became a wholly owned subsidiary of the Procter & Gamble Company. In the mid-1990s, Norwich constructed an Intermediate Potency solid dose form facility, from which the osteoporosis drug Actonel was launched.

In 2001, the North Norwich plant was purchased from Procter & Gamble by Outsourcing Services Group, who revived the original Norwich Pharmaceuticals name by placing it on the sign in front of the plant. Outsourcing Services Group was later purchased by private equity firm AFI Partners, who continued using the original name. In 2013, the company was rebranded Norwich Pharma Services, and it continues to manufacture medications for large companies, including onetime owner Procter & Gamble, under licensing agreements.

== See also ==
- Norwich Pharmacal Co. v Customs and Excise Commissioners 1974 AC 133
