= P. Buckley Moss =

American painter (1933–2024)

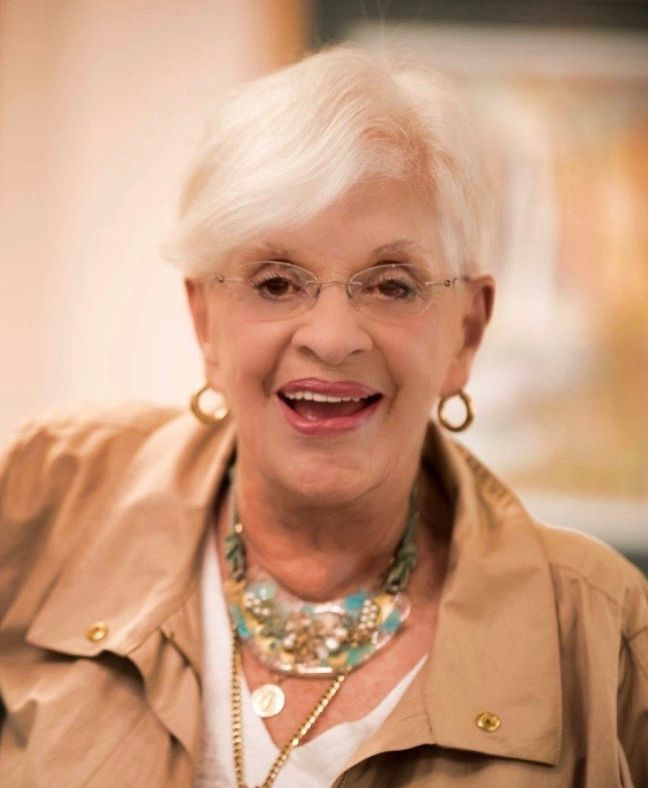
- Moss in 2020
- Born: Patricia Buckley; May 20, 1933; New York City, New York, U.S.
- Died: July 13, 2024 (aged 91)
- Education: Washington Irving High School for the Fine Arts; Cooper Union for the Advancement of Science and Art
- Known for: Painting, etching
- Notable work: Our Strength and Beauty; Flowers on Red; Brightening the Day; Spirit of Freedom; Swanky Rooster
- Spouses: Jack Moss (m. 1955; div. 1979); Malcolm Henderson (m. 1982, div. c. 2005)
- Children: 6
- Website: www.pbuckleymoss.com

Patricia Buckley Moss (May 20, 1933 – July 13, 2024) was an American artist, known especially for her paintings of rural Virginia, and for her support of children with learning disabilities.

== Early life and education ==
Patricia Buckley was born on Staten Island in New York City on May 20, 1933. Raised on Staten Island, she was the second of three children of a Sicilian-born mother and an Irish-American father. In her Catholic grade school, the nuns perceived Patricia as a poor student, a circumstance probably attributable to dyslexia. Nonetheless, one of her teachers determined that she, who was "Not Proficient in Anything", was artistically gifted. This helped to convince her mother to enroll her daughter in a specialized public school for girls, Washington Irving High School for the Fine Arts in Manhattan. Then in 1951, Patricia received a scholarship to study art at Cooper Union College.

== Personal life ==
Soon after graduating college in 1955, Buckley married Jack Moss. In 1964, his work as a chemical engineer found the couple and their five children (with a sixth on the way) relocating to Waynesboro, Virginia. This relocation would become pivotal in Patricia Moss's art and subject matter. In 1979, she divorced Jack Moss, remarrying in 1982 to her business manager Malcolm Henderson, whom she divorced c. 2005. The build-up of Moss Galleries resulted from the influence of Moss's marriage to Henderson. She had ten grandchildren.

Patricia Buckley Moss died on July 13, 2024, at the age of 91, shortly after developing a brain tumor.

== Art career ==
In 1964, Jack Moss's work took the family to Waynesboro, Virginia, in the Shenandoah Valley. Patricia Moss appreciated the rural scenery and began portraying it in her art. She was particularly drawn to the Amish and Mennonite people who farmed in the countryside, and she portrayed their figures in iconic ways. In 1967 she had a one-person museum exhibition that promptly sold out, after which Moss started to market her work more seriously. Her work subsequently received acclaim.

Referred to in 1988 as "The People's Artist," by journalist Charles Kuralt, Moss opened the P. Buckley Moss Museum in Waynesboro the following year. The facility has grown to attract roughly 45,000 visitors annually. Kuralt's moniker is often used in the museum's marketing. Today, artwork that Moss signed as P. Buckley Moss is represented in hundreds of galleries.

== Civic activities ==
Buckley Moss became a strong advocate for special education groups. Overcoming her own challenges with dyslexia, she became a role model for the learning-impaired and shared her message with special education classes throughout the United States. Events and donations of Moss's original works and prints to related children's charities have raised millions of dollars for their causes. The P. Buckley Moss Society was established by a few dedicated collectors in 1987, with a mission to assist and join the artist in her charitable endeavors. The Society has grown to include 23 chapters and approximately 8,000 members. In 1995, Moss founded the P. Buckley Moss Foundation for Children's Education to aid children with learning disabilities.

In addition to her work with special education, P. Buckley Moss actively raised money and awareness for breast cancer. A breast cancer survivor herself, Moss donated art and hand-painted quilts to benefit organizations that offered support to breast cancer patients.

In 2013 at Virginia Tech, the Moss Arts Center was named in appreciation for her pledged $10 million donation. In 2025, her family and the university shifted her name to the front lawn activity space.
