= Unguentine =

Antiseptic ointment

Unguentine is an over-the-counter topical antiseptic ointment produced by Lee Pharmaceuticals. It was introduced in 1893 as the first antiseptic surgical dressing ointment by Norwich Pharmaceuticals, who later brought Pepto Bismol to market.

It is used for treating the pain of minor burns, poison ivy, poison oak, itching, minor skin wounds and insect bites. Its active ingredients are camphor (3%), phenol (2.5%), tannic acid (2.2%) and zinc oxide (6.6%).

== See also ==
- Unguent
