= Artists Authorship Rights Act (New York) =

The Artists Authorship Rights Act is a 1984 New York law that provides legal protection for artists' moral rights.

The law was in part a reaction to California's passage of the California Art Preservation Act; however the New York Act provided for artists the right to disavow works that were altered against their wishes.

The Act was preempted by the similar federal Visual Artists Rights Act of 1990 (VARA), as held in Board of Managers of Soho Int'l Arts Condominium v. City of New York (S.D.N.Y. 2003). Although preempted, it remains part of New York law.
