= California Lawyers for the Arts =

American non-profit organization

- Abbreviation: CLA
- Formation: 1974; 52 years ago
- Type: Non-profit
- Website: www.calawyersforthearts.org

California Lawyers for the Arts (CLA) is a nonprofit organization founded in 1974, to provide legal services to artists and members of the creative arts community. The first executive director was Hamish Sandison, who was a recent graduate of Boalt Hall at University of California, Berkeley and is now a solicitor in London, England, specializing in law and technology. In 1987, Bay Area Lawyers for the Arts (BALA) joined forces with Volunteer Lawyers for the Arts-Los Angeles (VLA) to form California Lawyers for the Arts as a statewide organization. CLA is part of an informal network of “Volunteer Lawyers for the Arts” programs that serve artists through state-based organizations throughout the United States.

CLA has offices in Berkeley, Los Angeles, San Francisco, San Diego, and Sacramento, and the organization serves more than 11,000 artists annually. CLA has nearly 1,800 paid members, including artists and arts organizations of all disciplines and cultural backgrounds, attorneys, accountants, and teachers.

== History ==
In its early history, CLA board members and staff worked with state legislators to promulgate artists' rights legislation in California, including the State's Resale Royalty Act (1976) and the California Art Preservation Act (1980).

In 1993, with the help of a National Endowment for the Arts (NEA) Advancement grant, CLA expanded its mission to include articulating “a role for the arts in community development.” Following this, CLA received the first art-related grant from the San Francisco Department of Children, Youth and Families. In the mid-1990s, CLA began its statewide planning efforts, including a planning retreat with local arts agencies to include the arts in military base conversion. This work led to both a national conference funded by the NEA Design Arts Program and subsequent projects in Marin, San Francisco, Monterey and San Diego.

== Legislation ==
CLA has played a major role in enacting legislation for artists’ rights. In 1976, CLA collaborated with Senator Alan Sieroty of Los Angeles to enact the California Resale Royalties Act, which provides artists with a royalty on the resale price of any work of art. California remains the only state in the United States with this legislation. Although the law has been under controversy since its inception, the United States District Court upheld the law in 1978 in an opinion written by Judge Robert Takasugi. The United States Court of Appeals affirmed the lower court’s decision in Moreseberg v. Balyon, 621. F. 2d. 972 (9th Cir,), cert denied, 449 U.S. 983 (1980), stating that the Act is “an economic regulation to promote artistic endeavors generally.”

CLA also helped with the enactment of California Art Preservation Act (CAPA), California Civil Code Section 987. CAPA took effect on January 1, 1980 and granted artists the right to integrity, and the right of authorship. The right of integrity gives an artist the right to sue to prevent a work of his or her art from suffering injury, or to collect damages for an injury already suffered. The right of authorship provides an artist with the right to claim or disclaim authorship of a work of art.

== Programs ==
=== Lawyer referral and information services ===
CLA has a lawyer referral services for creative artists, arts organizations, and those with arts-related matters. The referral service handles arts and non-arts-related issues such as copyright, contract drafting, review, and negotiation, non-profit organization issues, landlord/tenant, organizational tax, employee or independent contractor, mediation and arbitration. Through a panel of specialized attorneys, CLA matches each client with a legal professional equipped to handle their specific needs.

=== Arts Arbitration and Mediation Services ===
AAMS was started in 1980 and provides alternative dispute resolution to artists, entertainers, and other members of the creative arts community. CLA’s AAMS program was the first alternative dispute resolution program in the United States to tailor its services for the arts and entertainment communities.

AAMS provides counseling, conciliation, mediation, arbitration, neutral evaluation and meeting facilitation. The service has neutral program coordinators who help artists throughout the state. AAMS coordinators also offer conciliation assistance, coordinate mediations with trained mediators, or coordinate arbitrations or early neutral evaluations.

=== Sacramento Mediation Center ===
The Sacramento Mediation Center (SMC) became a program of California Lawyers for the Arts in 2008 and is administered in CLA's Sacramento office. SMC provides mediation services to anyone in the Sacramento region on a wide range of topics and is not limited to arts-related cases.

=== Arts and Community Development ===
CLA launched The Arts and Community Development Project in 1993, which provides summer and year-round job and intern experiences in the arts to deserving young people.

Spotlight on the Arts is a program of The Arts and Community Development Project specifically aimed at deserving teens interested in the arts. These teenagers are provided with paid summer internships, workshops on conflict resolution, college preparation and career development, and trips to live cultural events. This Project is funded by public and private agencies and individuals.

=== Designing Creative Futures ===
Designing Creative Futures is a paid arts-focused internship program for formerly incarcerated individuals. This four month program offers unique opportunities for returning residents to work closely with arts organizations through paid, part-time internships. Participants learn a variety of skills associated with careers in the arts and gain mentorship from people who are leaders in their respective fields.

== Publications ==
The Art of Deduction has been published by CLA annually since the 1980s to serve as a tax preparation guide for creative artists. This publication offers a detailed explanation of tax preparation issues including money-saving tax filing tips specifically geared toward the creative community.

CLA published the first edition of Legislative Masterpieces in 1980, in response to the need for a comprehensive resource on California Legislative initiatives to protect artists and their works. This publication is updated periodically as the California Legislation emerges. Legislative Masterpieces is designed to serve as a useful tool for the California arts community and others nationwide.

== Advocacy ==
Recent advocacy efforts have focused on restoring state funding for the arts in California, starting with a series of three symposia on California Arts and Healthy Communities, held in Los Angeles, Walnut Creek and San Jose from 2006-08. The Arts and Environmental Initiative was begun in 2008 with a Dialogue in San Francisco, followed by a second Dialogue in Los Angeles in 2011. Efforts to restore Arts-in-Corrections programs began in early 2011.

== Artistic License Awards ==
In 2008, the organization began its Artistic License Awards in order to recognize leaders in government, law and the arts or arts organizations who have made a positive impact on the arts in California.

Awards recipients include:

- Adobe
- The Carlin Family
- The Chinese Culture Center, 2022
- Rafael Mandelman, Member, San Francisco Board of Supervisors, 2022
- Judy Chiu, U.S. Representative, 2020
- Ben Allen, California State Senator, 2020
- The Santa Fe Art Colony, 2020
- Vijay Gupta, 2020
- Buck Busfield, 2019
- Dr. Sheree Meyer, 2019
- The Royal Chicano Air Force, 2019
- Phil Serna, Member, Sacramento Supervisor, 2019
- Daniel Yamshon, 2019
- Ted Lieu, U.S. Representative, 2017
- Annette Bening
- Craig Watson
- Self Help Graphics & Art
- E. Randol Schoenberg, 2017
- Mark Leno, California State Senator, 2016
- Jim Nielsen, California State Senator, 2016
- The Sacramento Gay Men's Chorus, 2016
- Marcy Friedman, 2016
- Art Luna, 2016
- Ali Youssefi, 2016
- Ellen Taylor, 2016
- The Hancock Funds
- The William James Association, 2015
- Dr. Larry Brewster, University of San Francisco, 2015
- Steven Hirsch & Katherine Lloyd-Lovett of Keker, Van Nest & Peter, LLP, 2015
- Deborah Santana, Do a Little Fund, 2015
- London Breed, Member, San Francisco Supervisor, 2015
- John A. Pérez, Assembly Speaker Emeritus, 2014
- Fish & Richardson, P.C., 2014
- The Actors' Gang, 2014
- Carol Liu, California State Senator, 2013
- Alan Sieroty, California State Senator (ret)., 2013
- Wayne Kramer, Jail Guitar Doors USA, 2013
- Intel Corporation, 2013
- Catherine Emmanuel, 2013
- Curren D. Price, Jr., California Senator, 2012
- Inner-City Arts, 2012
- McDermott, Will & Emery, 2012
- Ozomatli, 2012
- Samuel Hoi, President, Otis College, 2012
- Roger Dickinson, Member California State Assembly, 2012
- Milton Bowens, 2012
- Liam Jones, 2012
- Susan Orr, 2012
- Jerry Perry, 2012
- Russell Solomon, 2012
- Attorney Jay L. Cooper, 2011
- Artist Frank Romero, 2011
- Musician Cathy Segal-Garcia, 2011
- LA Board of Supervisors Member Mark Ridley-Thomas, 2011
- PEN Center USA, 2011
- Malissa Feruzzi Shriver, Chair of the California Arts Council, 2011
- Geffen Playhouse, 2010
- Robert Graham (in memoriam), 2010
- Munger, Tolles & Olson, LLP, 2010
- Elsa Ramo, Esq., 2010
- Former First Lady of California Maria Shriver, 2010
- San Francisco Symphony, 2010
- U.S. Representative Diane Watson, 2010
- U.S. Speaker of the House Nancy Pelosi, 2010
- Rhodessa Jones of Cultural Odyssey, 2010
- Fenwick & West, 2010
- Henry Hopkins (in memoriam), 2010
- Abe Carnow, CPA, 2009
- Danny Glover and Ben Guillory of the Robey Theatre Company, 2009
- Don Knabe, Member, LA County Board of Supervisors, 2009
- Adolfo V. Nodal, 2009
- Orrick, Herrington & Sutcliffe, LLP, 2009
- Kim Curry-Evans, 2009
- Stephen L. Davis, Esq., 2009
- Charles (Chuck) Miller (in memoriam), 2009
- Darrell Steinberg, California State Senate President Pro Tem, 2009
- Wayne Thiebaud, Artist, 2009
- Rose Marie Cano of Plaza de la Raza, 2008
- Greenberg Glusker, 2008
- Jan Perry, LA City Council Member, 2008
- Jack Scott, California State Senator, 2008
- Greg Victoroff, 2008
- June Wayne, Artist, 2008
- Zev Yaroslavsky, Member, LA County Board Supervisors, 2008
