= Carter v. Helmsley-Spear Inc. =

American legal case

- Court: United States Court of Appeals for the Second Circuit
- Full case name: John Carter, John Swing and John Veronis v. Helmsley-Spear Inc. and 474431 Associates
- Argued: March 15, 1995
- Decided: December 1, 1995
- Citation: 71 F.3d 77 (2d Cir. 1995)

Case history
- Prior history: 861 F. Supp. 303 (S.D.N.Y. 1994)
- Subsequent history: cert. denied, 116 S. Ct. 1824 (1996)

Court membership
- Judges sitting: Thomas Joseph Meskill, Richard J. Cardamone, Frank Altimari

Case opinions
- Majority: Cardamone

Laws applied
- Visual Artists Rights Act

Carter v. Helmsley-Spear, Inc. 861 F. Supp. 303 (S.D.N.Y. 1994), rev'd 71 F.3d 77 (2d Cir. 1995), cert. denied 116 S. Ct. 1824 (1996).

== Overview ==
This an early case of authors attempting to exercise their moral rights under the Visual Artists Rights Act (VARA). VARA was passed in 1990 and added several moral rights for artists in the U.S., including the right of authors to prevent mutilation of their works.

== Facts ==
The Plaintiffs John Carter, John Swing, and John Veronis (artists) created art and sculpture work together in New York City under the name "Jx3". 474431 Associates was the owner of a former Macy's warehouse at 47-44 31st Street, in the Long Island City section of Queens, New York. 474431 Associates leased this building to 47-44 31st Street Associates, L.P. and from February 1, 1990 to June, 1993, SIG Management Company ["SIG"] managed the property as "The Factory Building" and marketed it as a mall.

On December 16, 1991, the artists entered into a contract with SIG "to design, create and install sculpture and other permanent installations" in the building. The artists had "full authority in design, color, and style" of the artwork they installed. The artists created multiple ecological themed sculptures along with a mosaic on the floor made of recycled light bulbs. SIG could direct the location and installation of the artwork within the building. SIG agreed to pay the artists one thousand dollars a week for at least forty hours of work. The artists retained copyright in their work, but SIG was to receive 50% of all proceeds from the exploitation of the art.

On March 31, 1994, Helmsley-Spear, Inc. assumed the management of the property. Helmsley-Spear's representatives forbade the artists from installing any further artwork, and stated that they were going to remove the completed art from the building. The artists believed that this was a mutilation of their artwork under Visual Artists Rights Act and filed a lawsuit to enjoin the defendants from taking such actions.

== District Court ==
The District Court for the Southern District of New York, the Second District, granted the artists an injunction under VARA prohibiting removal of the work. That decision was appealed to the Second Circuit Court of Appeals.

== Circuit Court ==
The Second Circuit found that the sculpture was a work made for hire and vacated the injunction. In coming to this conclusion, it applied the 13-factor test from Community for Creative Non-Violence v. Reid, 490 U.S. 730, for determining if a work is created as a "work made for hire" or if the artist was working as "independent contractor".
