= The Angelus (painting) =

1857–1859 painting by Jean-François Millet

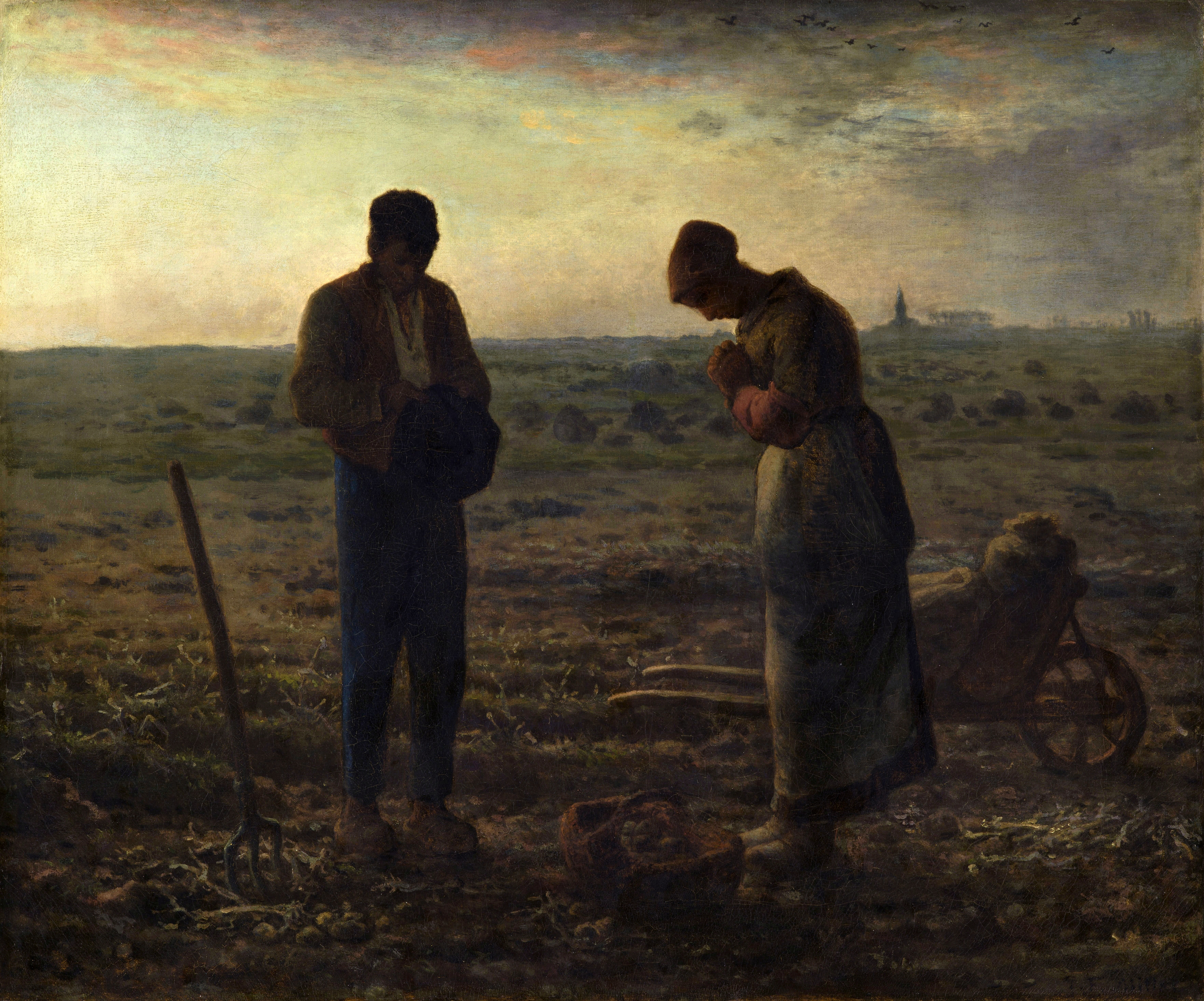
- Artist: Jean-François Millet
- Year: 1857–1859
- Medium: oil paint, canvas
- Dimensions: 55.5 cm (21.9 in) × 66 cm (26 in)
- Location: Musée d'Orsay
- Owner: John W. Wilson, Eugène Secrétan
- Commissioner: Thomas Gold Appleton
- Accession: RF 051804048

The Angelus (French: L'Angélus) is an oil painting by French painter Jean-François Millet, completed between 1857 and 1859.

The painting depicts two peasants in a field bowing over a basket of potatoes, while saying a prayer, the Angelus. The prayer and the ringing of the church bell mark the end of a day's work. The church is depicted on the horizon.

Millet was commissioned by the American would-be painter and art collector Thomas Gold Appleton, who never came to collect it. The painting drove up the prices for artworks of the Barbizon school to record amounts in the late 19th century.

== History ==
The painting in its original form was titled Prayer for the Potato Crop. When the commissioner, Thomas Gold Appleton, failed to take possession, Millet added a steeple and changed the title of the work to The Angelus—a reference to the Catholic prayer.

Millet said: "The idea for The Angelus came to me because I remembered that my grandmother, hearing the church bell ringing while we were working in the fields, always made us stop work to say the Angelus prayer for the poor departed." Completed between 1857 and 1859, it is an oil painting on canvas.

It depicts two peasants, a man and a woman, during the potato harvest in Barbizon. The church steeple of Chailly-en-Bière is on the horizon in the background. At their feet is a small basket of potatoes, and around them a potato fork, the sacks and the wheelbarrow. Various interpretations of the relationship between the two peasants have been made, such as colleagues at work, husband and wife pair, or (as Gambetta interpreted it) farmer and maidservant. An 1889 sales catalogue described them simply as "a young peasant and his companion." Millet sold The Angelus after his The Gleaners was sold at the Salon of 1857. About half the size, it brought him less than half the amount for which he sold The Gleaners. The Angelus was eventually shown the year before Millet's death in Brussels in 1874, where it was greatly admired by Léon Gambetta.

After his death in 1875, two auctions and an exhibition increased people’s understanding of his art. Two catastrophes, the Franco-Prussian War and the Paris Commune, caused people to search for unifying, national symbols and Millet’s art answered that desire and increased the appreciation for his paintings.

== The Angelus prayer ==
The Angelus prayer played a significant part for some Christians in 19th century in France. The name of the prayer derives from the Angel Gabriel's annunciation that Mary would give birth to Jesus, the son of God. For the Angelus the church bell would ring three times a day — dawn, noon and dusk. Rural nineteenth-century France was religious, and had a large portion of those who worked in agriculture, as Millet did when he was young. The Angelus was a prayer, and also gave a sense of structure to daily working life.

The prayer begins: "The Angel of the Lord declared to Mary:/And she conceived of the Holy Spirit..."

== Commentary ==
At first, the painting was interpreted as a political statement, with Millet viewed as a socialist in solidarity with the workers. While the painting expresses a profound sense of religious devotion, and became one of the most widely reproduced religious paintings of the 19th century, with prints displayed by thousands of devout householders across France, Millet painted it from a sense of nostalgia rather than from any strong religious feeling. According to Karine Huguenaud, "There is, however, no religious message to the painting: Millet was simply concerned with portraying a ritualised moment of meditation taking place as the dusk rolls in." In 1864 Belgian minister Jules Van Praët exchanged it for Millet's Bergère avec son troupeau (Shepherd and her flock) and commented, "What can I say? It is clearly a masterpiece, but faced with these two peasants, whose work is interrupted by prayer, everyone thinks they can hear the nearby church bell tolling, and in the end, the constant ringing just became tiresome".

== Salvador Dalí ==
Salvador Dalí had a particular interest in Millet's l'Angélus. He not only included images derived from Millet's painting in a number of his art works, but Dalí also studied and published in his book, Le mythe tragique de l'Angélus de Millet, his interpretations of the painting. Dalí suggests the tone of piety in the painting verges on that of grief, and that the man and woman in the painting may in fact be mourning over the grave of a child. Based on that idea, Dalí requested that the Louvre museum X-ray l'Angélus, which they did. The X-rays, published in Dalí's book, reveal an "oblong geometrical shape" at the feet of the figures in the painting. Dalí claims it is a coffin, but that suggestion, based on the X-ray image, has not been widely accepted.

== Provenance ==
The painting triggered a rush of patriotic fervour when the Louvre tried to buy it in 1889. In 1932 it was vandalized by a madman.

With reference to the Musée d'Orsay, the partial provenance of the work is as follows; although some events are missing, such as the Brussels show in 1874:

- 1860 – owned by Belgian landscape painter Victor de Papeleu who bought it for 1,000 francs;
- 1860 – owned by Alfred Stevens, who paid 2,500 fr.;
- 1860 – owned by Jules Van Praët, Brussels;
- 1864 – Paul Tesse obtained it by exchanging it for La Grande bergère (Shepherdess and flock) by Millet; (Note: The Shepherdess and flock is also in the Musée d'Orsay's collection, nr. RF 1879.)
- 1865 – owned by Emile Gavet, Paris;
- By 1881, collection John Waterloo Wilson, avenue Hoche, Paris; his sale at hôtel Drouot, 16 March 1881;
- 16 March 1881, Eugène Secrétan, a French art collector and copper industrialist who donated copper for the Statue of Liberty, bidding against M. Dofœr, for 168,000 fr., with fees;
- Secrétan sale (63), 1 July 1889, galerie Sedelmeyer, Paris – bidding war between the Louvre (Antonin Proust) and the American Art Association; James F. Sutton drives the sale price to 553,000 francs;
- 1889 – 1890, collection American Art Association, New York; sale 1890 to the Paris collector and philanthropist, Hippolyte François Alfred Chauchard (1821–1909), for 750,000 fr.;
- 1890 – 1909, collection Alfred Chauchard;
- 1909: Chauchard bequest of 1906 to the French State; formally accepted 15 January 1910 into the permanent collection of the musée du Louvre, Paris;
- 1986 – transferred to the permanent collection of musée d'Orsay, Paris.

== Legacy ==
A month after the Secretan sale, The Gleaners was sold for 300,000 francs, and the contrast between the auction prices of Millet's paintings on the art market and the value of Millet's estate for his surviving family led to the droit de suite (French for "right to follow"), a French law that compensates artists or their heirs when artworks are resold.

The imagery of The Angelus with peasants praying was a popular sentimental 19th-century religious subject. Generations later, Salvador Dalí had seen a reproduction of it on the wall of his childhood school and claimed to have been spooked by the painting. He felt the basket looked like the coffin of a child and the woman looked like a praying mantis. He was inspired to create his paranoiac-critical paintings The Architectonic Angelus of Millet and Gala and the Angelus of Millet Preceding the Imminent Arrival of the Conical Anamorphoses in 1933. These were followed two years later by a similar pair of paintings which included a partial reproduction of Millet's The Angelus, called The Angelus of Gala and Archaeological Reminiscence of Millet's Angelus. In 1938, he published a book Le Mythe tragique de l'Angélus de Millet.

== See also ==
- 1859 in art
