= Droit de suite =

Right granted to artists to receive resale fee

Droit de suite (French for "right to follow") or Artist's Resale Right (ARR) is a right granted to artists or their heirs, in some jurisdictions, to receive a fee on the resale of their works of art. This should be contrasted with policies such as the American first-sale doctrine, where artists do not have the right to control or profit from subsequent sales.

== History ==
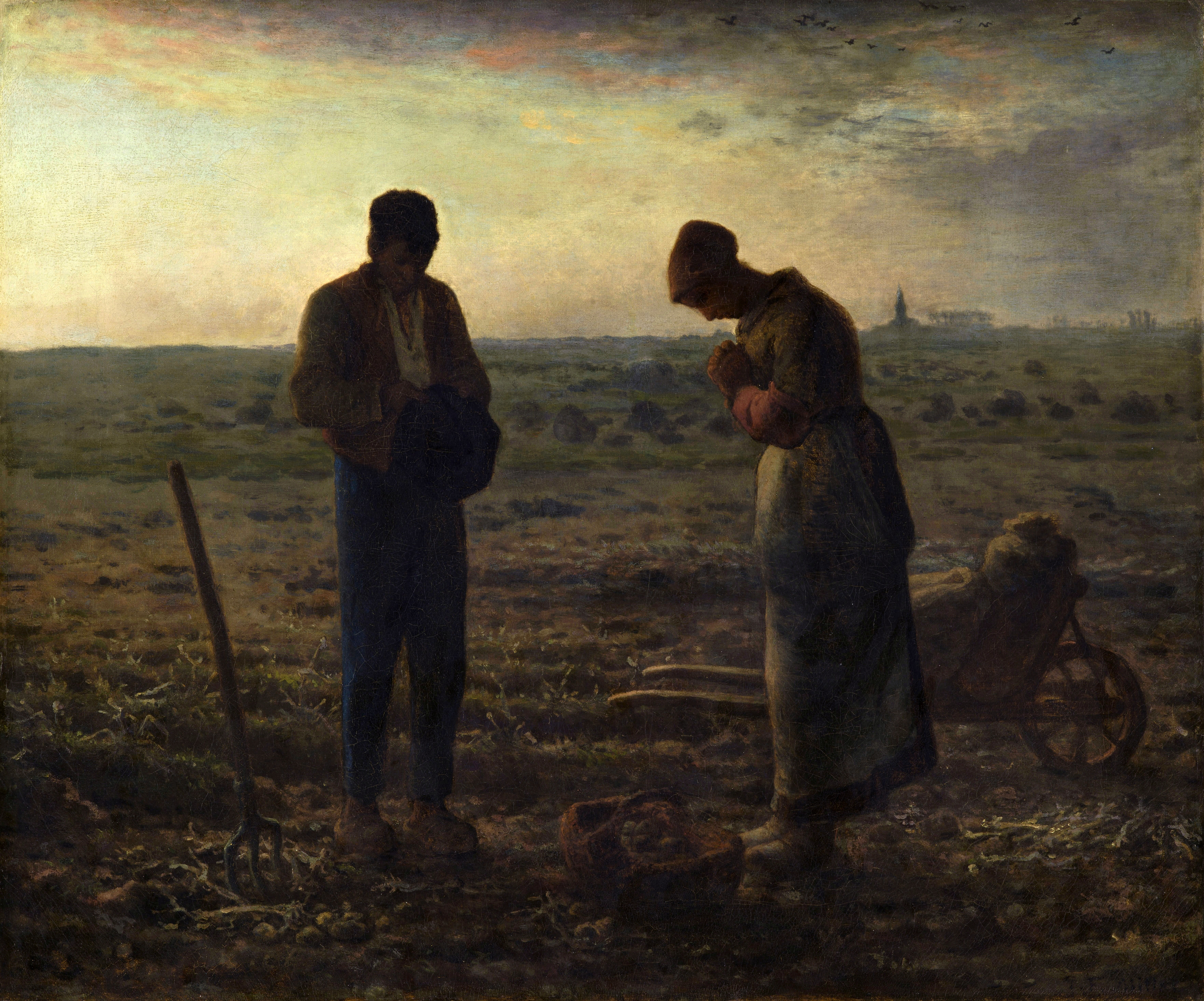
The Angelus was sold by Millet for 1,000 francs in 1865, but just 14 years after Millet's death in 1889 it was sold by the copper merchant Secrétan for 553,000 francs

The droit de suite was first proposed in France around 1893, in response to a decrease in the importance of the salon and the end of the private patron, and to champion the cause of the "starving artist". France enacted the right into law in 1920, seemingly because many artists, and their families, had suffered from the First World War, and droit de suite was seen as a means to remedy socially difficult situations.

According to Renaud Donnedieu de Vabres, droit de suite was created in France following the sale of Millet's 1858 painting, the Angélus, in 1889 at the Secretan sale. The owner of the painting made a huge profit from this sale, whereas the family of the artist lived in poverty.

== Legislation ==
=== International ===
The Berne Convention of 1971 enshrines authors' and artists' "inalienable right to an interest" in a resale of their work, but has no legal force in the absence of national legislation implementing it.

=== European Union ===
The 2001/84/EC directive mandates a somewhat uniform system of droit de suite across the European Union. This directive is controversial in the United Kingdom.

=== France ===
In France, this system has been in force since 1920 through article L122-8 of the Code of intellectual property. It will be reformed by article 48 of the DADVSI law, which implements directive 2001/84/EC. During discussions in the French Parliament leading to this law, it was argued that in practice, the droit de suite is only paid at auctions, and that it thus disfavors the Paris art marketplace compared to London or New York City. Following DADVSI, a government regulation (through a decree) is to set degressive rates and maximal fees so that the Paris marketplace is not hindered.

=== United Kingdom ===
As a result of the Artists Campaign for Resale Right (ACfRR) that represented up to 80,000 British Artists through 23 affiliated Artist representative organisations and led by Anya Elizabeth Patel, Visual Artist & Artist Rights Advocate of the National Artists Association and Rachel Duffield, CEO of the Design & Artists Copyright Society (DACS) and their team, the Artist's Resale Right (ARR) was enacted in the UK in 2006 to implement the EU Directive.

=== Canada ===
The first proposal to amend the Copyright Act in the Canadian parliament to make resale right mandatory in Canada took place in 2013 but the bill was defeated. Second attempt was made in 2019. The Canadian House of Commons Standing Committee on Industry, Science and Technology recommended further study and consideration to implement national artist's resale right. The Canadian House of Commons Standing Committee on Canadian Heritage took this one step further, recommending that the Canadian Government should establish artist's resale right. In 2021, Canadian Artists' Representation also began to explore amending the Copyright Act rather than drafting a new legislative bill to speed up the legislation process.

=== United States ===
The 1977 California Resale Royalties Act (CRRA) (Civil Code section 986) applied to all works of fine art resold in California, or resold anywhere by a California resident, for a gross sale of $1000 or more. It had mandated a five percent royalty on the resale price of any work of fine art. An artist was able to waive this right "by a contract in writing providing for an amount in excess of five percent of the amount of such sale." It was the only law of its kind implemented in the United States. At least one scholar has proposed that this law is unconstitutional in that it effects a Fifth Amendment taking of private property.

The California Resale Royalty Act was struck down as unconstitutional on May 17, 2012, because it violated the US Constitution Interstate Commerce clause, ending a 35-year run that entitled artists to a royalty payment upon the resale of their works of art under certain circumstances. The ruling by Judge Jacqueline H. Nguyen of the U.S. District Court, Central District of California, is pending appeal in the 9th Circuit Court of Appeals. Judge Nguyen added:

The Court finds that the CRRA explicitly regulates applicable sales of fine art occurring wholly outside California [emphasis added]. Under its clear terms, the CRRA regulates transactions occurring anywhere in the United States, so long as the seller resides in California. Even the artist---the intended beneficiary of the CRRA---does not have to be a citizen of, or reside in, California....Therefore, the CRRA violates the Commerce Clause of the United States Constitution.

In September 2012, the U.S. Copyright Office published a "Notice of Inquiry" regarding establishing an artist "resale royalty right" in the US. The Notice was published in response to a request by Representative Jerrold Nadler and Senator Herb Kohl, who had introduced droit de suite legislation in 2011. The Copyright Office's subsequent report endorsed "congressional consideration of a resale royalty right, or droit de suite, which would give artists a percentage of the amount paid for a work each time it is resold by another party." A follow-up bill was introduced in 2014, the American Royalties Too Act, and was vigorously opposed by auction houses. The bill died in committee.

On July 6, 2018, the U.S. Court of Appeals for the Ninth Circuit ruled that the California Resale Royalties Act is preempted by the federal Copyright Act—which does not recognize an artist's right to resale royalties. Now, only works resold from January 1, 1977 to January 1, 1978, when the Copyright Act became effective, are eligible for the royalty payment.

=== Australia ===
The Resale Royalty Right for Visual Artists Act 2009 gives the creator of an artwork the right to receive a royalty when their work is resold on the commercial art market. For artworks already in existence at 9 June 2010, the royalty applies only to the second and subsequent resales after that date. Under clauses 22 and 23 of the act artists have a case by case right to instruct the appointed government agency the Copyright Agency Ltd, to not collect and/or make their own individual collection arrangements.

The royalty is calculated as 5% of the sale price, but does not apply where that price is less than $1,000. It is payable, via an official collecting agency, or if the creator chooses (on a case by case basis) it can be paid directly to the creator, on resales made during their lifetime and to their heirs for resales made up to 70 years after the creator's death. The primary legal obligation to pay the royalty rests on the seller. However, in economic terms, it may effectively be passed on to the purchaser.

Eligible artworks include original works of graphic or plastic art, including pictures, collages, paintings, drawings, engravings, prints, lithographs, sculptures, tapestries, ceramics, glassware, photographs, fine art textiles, installations, fine art jewellery, artists' books, carvings and multi-media artworks.

The royalty is restricted to Australian citizens or residents, though there is provision for reciprocal rights to be extended in the future to persons resident in other jurisdictions with compatible royalty schemes.

The introduction of the scheme was controversial, as it has been elsewhere. During the first three years of its operation, royalty payments totaling $1.5m were made to about 650 artists for 6,800 transactions, with about 50% going to Indigenous artists. The highest individual royalty was A$50,000. Most recipients have received amounts ranging from A$50 to A$500. The average transaction cost is reportedly $30 AU.

A review of the scheme was announced in June 2013.

=== Philippines ===
The Intellectual Property Code of the Philippines (Republic Act 8293) gives the author/artist or his heirs a 5-percent share in the gross proceeds of the sale or lease of the original painting, sculpture, or manuscript, subsequent to its first disposition by the creator. This right exists during the lifetime of the author or artist and fifty years after his/her death.

== See also ==
- California Resale Royalties Act
- First-sale doctrine
