= Eugène Secrétan =

French industrialist and art collector (1836–1899)

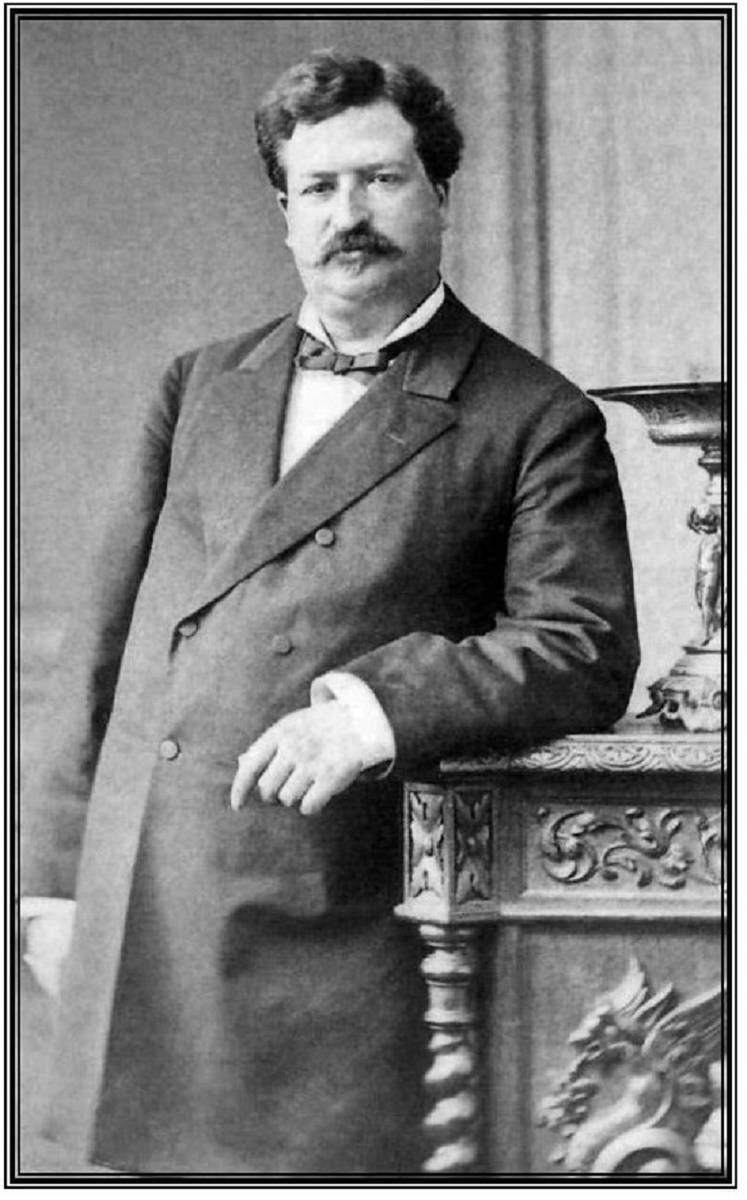
- Born: November 27, 1836; Saulx
- Died: March 11, 1899 (aged 62); Paris

Pierre-Eugène Secrétan (1836, Saulx – 1899, Paris) was a French industrialist and art collector.

== Biography ==
According to the Museum of the City of New York he was a French copper industrialist who made his fortune in copper production. He donated 60,000 kilos of copper in the 1870s to make Liberty Enlightening the World, commonly known as the Statue of Liberty. He later lost his wealth in the copper crash of 1889 when his "Société industrielle et commerciale des métaux" went bankrupt after an attempt to corner the market on copper.

After the copper crash in March 1889, he sold his extended art collection in Charles Sedelmeyer's Galerie Sedelmeyer after printing and publicizing a catalogue in French and English to attract American investors. He timed the sale to coincide with the peak of the Exposition Universelle (1889), exhibiting the Eiffel Tower, which attracted many wealthy Americans. A French-American bidding war during the auction on L'Angélus, a work by the popular French painter Jean-François Millet of the Barbizon school, forced the price up to a record-breaking amount of 553,000 francs by Antonin Proust, who was bidding for the Louvre. Proust only had 180,000 francs however, and after spending a day trying to save the work for France, he called James F. Sutton of the American Art Association to buy it from him for 552,000. The provenance of the work reflects that Secretan owned the painting from the time it was first shown in 1865, and the American Art Association from 1889.

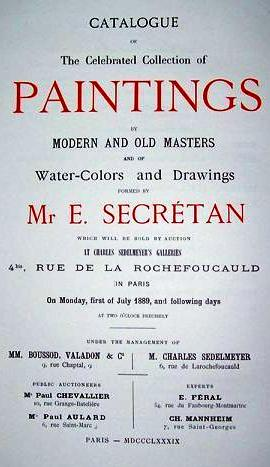
Catalogue of the celebrated Collection of Paintings, by Modern and Old Masters, and of Water-Colours and Drawings, formed by Mr E. Secretan, sold at Sedelmeyer Galleries, Paris, July, 1889

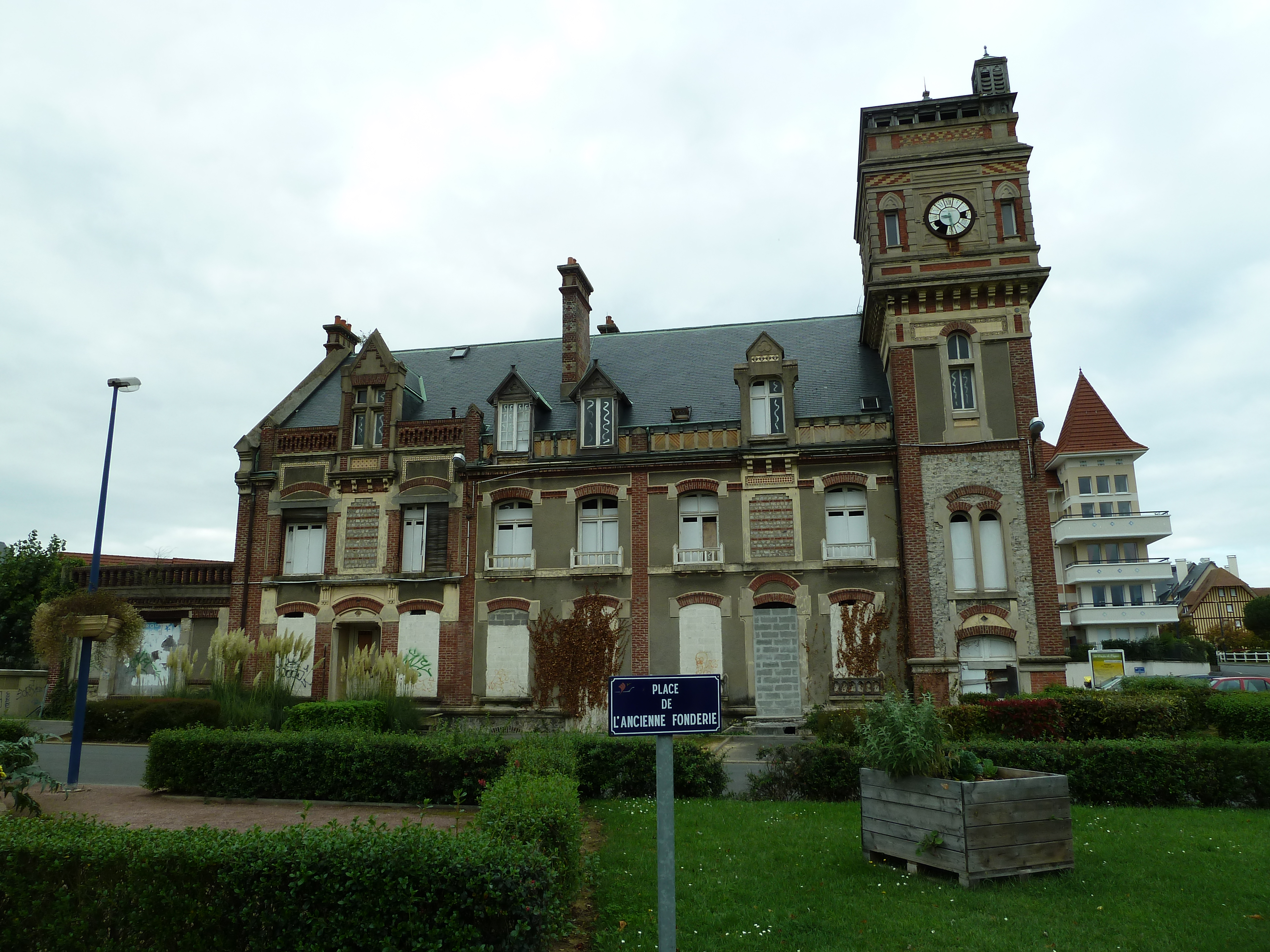
Secretan's residence near his factory in Dives-sur-Mer, today a protected national monument

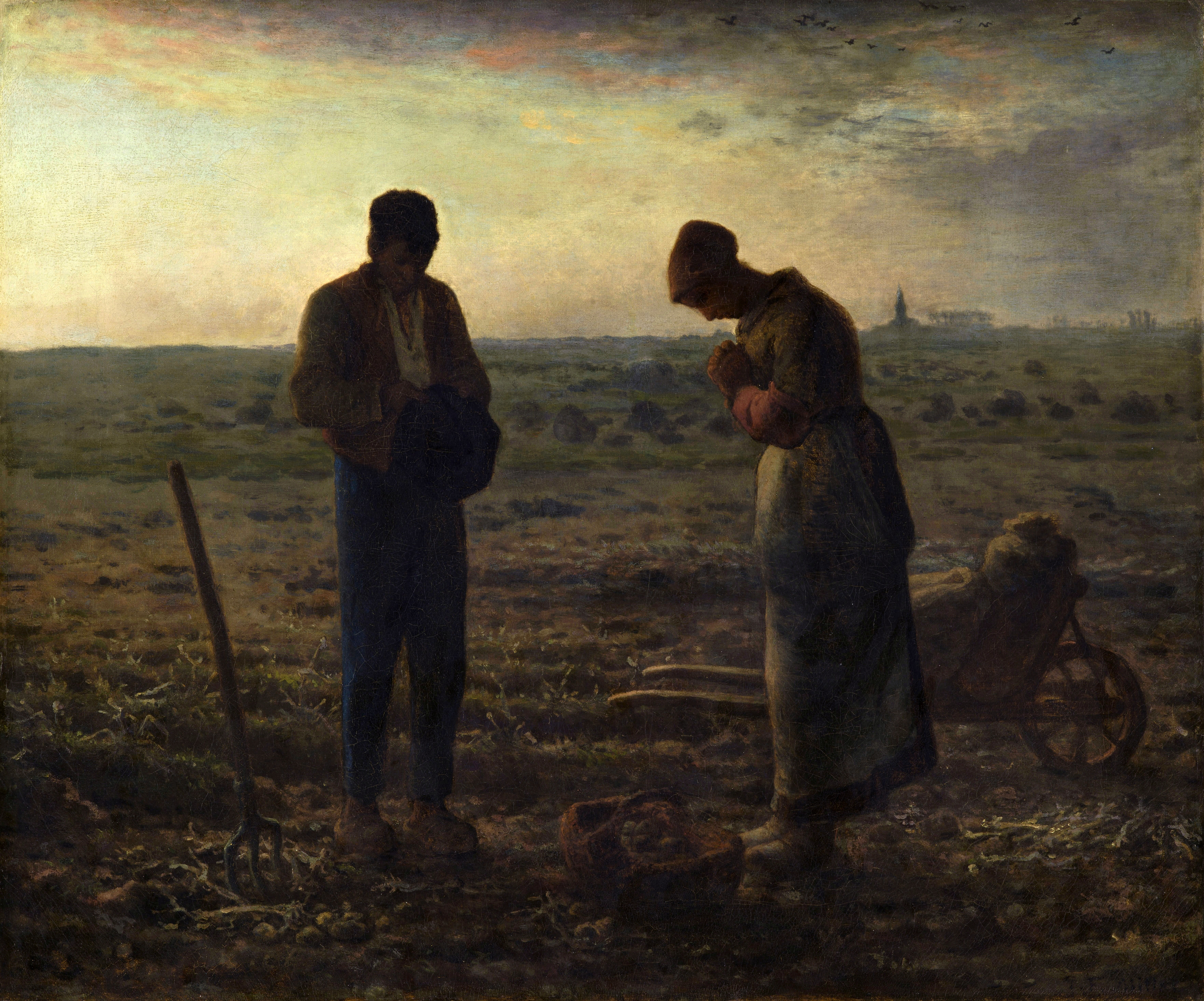
L'Angélus, Musée d'Orsay, 1857-1859

Other works from this sale on 1 July 1889 can be found in many American museums today.

With the proceeds from this sale, Secretan, an expert in metallurgy, paid his creditors and restarted his work in copper by making a deal with an English company and founded a factory in Dives-sur-Mer called "Elmore's French Patent Copper Depositing Company".
