= Volunteer Lawyers for the Arts =

American nonprofit organization(s)

Volunteer Lawyers for the Arts (VLA) is both a generic term for legal service organizations located throughout the United States and the proper name of the organization in New York City. Founded in 1969, that organization is the oldest VLA in the country.

== History ==
The first VLA organization, named simply Volunteer Lawyers for the Arts, was founded in 1969 and serves the New York area out of its Manhattan office. Chicago-based lawyers for the Creative Arts was founded in 1972. Bay Area Lawyers for the Arts (BALA) was founded two years later. When BALA expanded to Southern California, joining with Volunteer Lawyers for the Arts-Los Angeles, the organization was renamed California Lawyers for the Arts. Denver-based Colorado Lawyers for the Arts began operations in 1974, incorporated in 1979 and continues to serve that state's arts community.

Among the newer Volunteer Lawyers for the Arts organizations are New Jersey Volunteer Lawyers for the Arts, Inc. and Kansas City Volunteer Lawyers and Accountants for the Arts, both founded in 2004. More recently still, Tennessee Lawyers for the Arts, opened in Nashville in 2005.

There are more than 30 VLA programs throughout the United States. Not a single organization, but rather a network united by similar missions, the organizations provide a broad range of free and low-cost legal services and educational programs addressing the needs of artists and arts organizations of all artistic disciplines.

Each VLA organization operates independently. Most are nonprofit organizations, while others are housed with arts councils, arts services organizations, bar associations or business for the arts programs.

== Services ==
Some of the programs provided include:

Legal services through referrals and, in some cases, on-site consultations; legal clinics; alternative dispute resolution services, including mediation and arbitration; accounting services; law student internships; advocacy; educational programs on such topics as contracts, copyright, estate planning, taxes and nonprofit incorporation; and publications on a broad range of topics.

Without these services provided by these organizations, many arts-related legal problems would go unresolved and many artists would be denied an opportunity to develop their creative abilities fully.

== Organizations ==
=== Arizona ===
Volunteer Legal Assistance for Artists, Arizona

=== California ===
Beverly Hills Bar Association Barristers Committee for the Arts 300 S. Beverly Dr., Ste. 201 Beverly Hills, CA 90212 (310) 601-2422

California Lawyers for the Arts (Sacramento) 2015 J Street, Set. 204, Sacramento, CA 95811 (916) 441-7979

California Lawyers for the Arts (San Francisco) Fort Mason Center, 2 Marina Blvd., Building C, Rm 265 San Francisco, CA 94123 (415) 775-7200

California Lawyers for the Arts (Los Angeles) 12304 Santa Monica, Blvd, Ste. 304. Los Angeles, CA 90025 (310) 207-0001

California Lawyers for the Arts (Berkeley) Wells Fargo Building, 2140 Shattuck Ave., Suite 309, Berkeley, CA 94704 (888) 775-8995

California Lawyers for the Arts (San Diego) 2869 Historic Decatur Rd., San Diego, CA 92106 (888) 775-8995

San Diego Performing Arts League 110 West C St. #1414 San Diego, CA 92101 (619) 238-0700 x. 16

=== Colorado ===
Colorado Lawyers for the Arts 720-272-0961

=== District of Columbia ===
Washington Area Lawyers for the Arts 1629 K Street, NW, Suite 300 Washington, DC 20006 (202) 289-4440

=== Florida ===
Legal Art 924 Lincoln Rd. #205 Miami Beach, FL 33139 (305) 674-8278

Florida Lawyers for the Arts, Inc. PO Box 2091 St. Petersburg, FL 33731 (727) 823-5809

=== Georgia ===
Georgia Lawyers for the Arts 887 West Marietta St. NW, Suite J-101 Atlanta, GA 30318 (404) 873-3911

=== Illinois ===
Lawyers for the Creative Arts 161 N. Clark St., Suite 4300 Chicago, IL 60601 (312) 649-4111

=== Indiana ===
Creative Arts Legal League 20 N. Meridian St. #500 Indianapolis, IN 46204

=== Iowa ===
Iowa Volunteer Lawyers for the Arts c/o David J. Bright 122 South Linn St. Iowa City, IA 522240

=== Louisiana ===
Louisiana Volunteer Lawyers for the Arts 818 Howard St. New Orleans, LA 70113 (504) 523-2430

=== Maine ===
Maine Volunteer Lawyers for the Arts P.O. Box 17911 511 Congress St. Portland, ME 04112-17911 (207) 699-4600

=== Maryland ===
Maryland Volunteer Lawyers for the Arts 1500 Union Ave., Suite 1330 Baltimore, MD 21211 (410) 752-1633

=== Massachusetts ===
Volunteer Lawyers for the Arts of Massachusetts 15 Channel Center Street Suite 103 Boston, MA 02210 (617) 350-7600

=== Michigan ===
Creative Many Michigan 440 Burroughs Street, Suite 365 Detroit, Michigan 48202 (313) 483-5705

=== Minnesota ===
Springboard for the Arts 308 Prince St. St. Paul, MN 55101 (651) 292-4381

=== Missouri ===
KC Volunteer Lawyers and Accountants for the Arts 115 W. 18th St. Kansas City, MO 64108 (816) 472-3535

St. Louis Volunteer Lawyers and Accountants for the Arts 6128 Delmar St. Louis, MO 63112 (314) 863-6930

=== New Hampshire ===
New Hampshire Business Committee for the Arts One Granite Pl. Concord, NH 03301 (603) 224-8300

=== New Jersey ===
New Jersey Volunteer Lawyers for the Arts P.O. Box 2265 Flemington, NJ 08822 (856) 963-6300

=== New York ===
Volunteer Lawyers for the Arts 729 Seventh Avenue New York, NY 10019 (212) 319-2787

=== North Carolina ===
North Carolina Volunteer Lawyers for the Arts PO Box 26513 Raleigh, NC 26513 (919) 699-6285

=== Ohio ===
Volunteer Lawyers for the Arts Program Cleveland Bar Association 1301 E 9th St. Cleveland, OH 44114 (216) 696-3525

=== Oregon ===
Oregon Volunteer Lawyers for the Arts Portland, OR

=== Pennsylvania ===
Philadelphia Volunteer Lawyers for the Arts (Arts and Business Council) 200 S. Broad St. Philadelphia, PA 19102 (215) 790-3836 x1

Greater Pittsburgh Arts Council 707 Penn Ave. #2 Pittsburgh, PA 15222 (412) 391-2060

=== Rhode Island ===
Ocean State Lawyers for the Arts PO Box 19 Saunderstown, RI 02874 (401) 789-5686

=== Tennessee ===
Tennessee Volunteer Lawyers for the Arts 1900 Belmont Blvd. Nashville, TN 37212 (615) 460-8274

=== Texas ===
Texas Accountants & Lawyers for the Arts PO Box 144722 Austin, TX 78714 (800) 526-8252

=== Washington ===
Washington Lawyers for the Arts 6512 23rd St. NW #320 Seattle, WA 98117 (206) 328-7053

=== Wisconsin ===
Arts Wisconsin PO Box 1054 Madison, WI 53701 (608) 255-8316
