= Eugen Jettel =

Austrian artist (1845-1901)

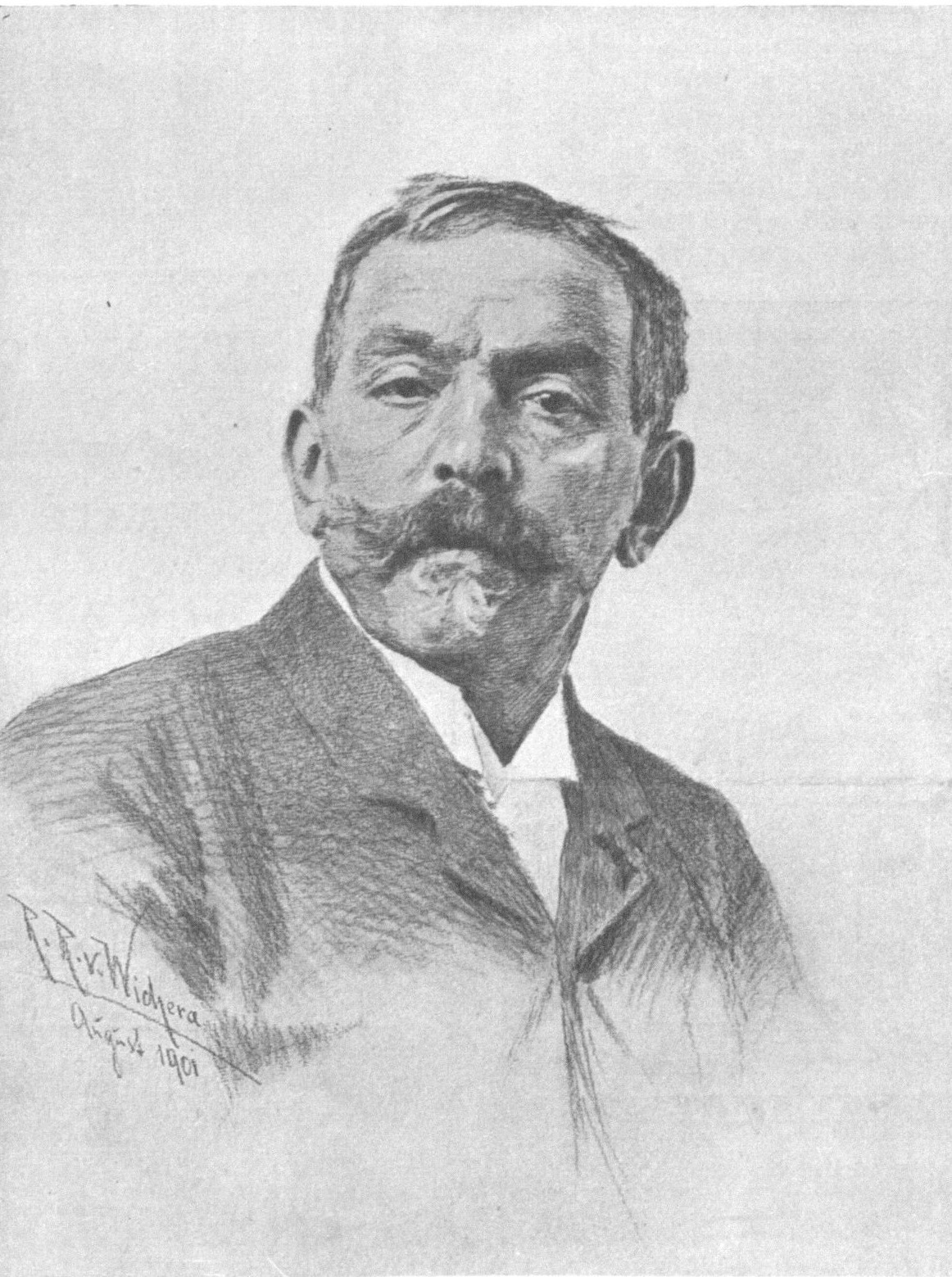
- Portrait by Raimund von Wichera
- Born: Richard Alfred Eugen Jettel; 20 March 1845; Rýmařov, Moravia, Austrian Empire
- Died: 27 August 1901 (aged 56); Lussingrande, Croatia-Slavonia, Austria-Hungary
- Resting place: Trieste
- Education: Academy of Fine Arts, Vienna
- Occupation: painter
- Style: impressionism, Art Nouveau
- Awards: Chevalier of the Légion d'honneur

Richard Alfred Eugen Jettel (20 March 1845 – 27 August 1901) was an Austrian painter, producing mainly landscapes. He studied at the Vienna Academy and moved to Paris in 1873, before moving back to Vienna in 1897 and serving as a co-founder of the Vienna Secession. He was made a Knight of the Légion d'honneur in 1898.

== Life ==
Jettel was the son of Sophie and Ladislaus Hugo Jettel, an ironworks-administrator. After his mother's death, the family moved to Vienna. His father died before he was 15.

In 1860, Jettel entered the class of Albert Zimmermann in the Academy of Fine Arts, Vienna, where he met Emil Jakob Schindler, Robert Russ and Rudolf Ribarz; there, he studied landscape painting and stayed until 1869. Study tours took him to France, the Netherlands, Istria and Hungary. In 1868 he became a member of the Vienna Künstlerhaus, and would exhibit several times there. While in Vienna, he came under August von Pettenkofen's influence. In 1872–73 he travelled around Italy with Leopold Carl Müller.

Jettel moved to Paris in 1873 to take up a well-paying job for the Austrian art dealer Charles Sedelmeyer, and led a successful artistic life there. Sedelmeyer may have hoped that Jettel would marry his daughter. However, instead, he married Cäcilie Mailer, the daughter of the owner of a glovemaker from Vienna. Sedelmeyer reduced his salary, and the couple found themselves in financial distress.

He had exhibitions during 1877–1881 at the Salon des Champs-Elysées and between 1890 and 1897 at the Salon du Champ-de-Mars, and he was nominated as a member of the 1889 Exposition Universelle jury. In 1898, he was made a Knight of the Légion d'honneur. He was at the centre of a circle of Austrian and German artists in Paris, but also had contact with French peers (including serving as a teacher to Émile Barau) and ties to the Barbizon school.

An inheritance gave him the means to return to Vienna in 1897. He was a founding member of the Vienna Secession, sat on the Secession's working committee, and his work was shown at the group's fourth exhibition in 1899. Still successful artistically, he received patronage from Archduke Charles Stephen and his wife Archduchess Maria Theresia. In his last years, he visited Istria many times to paint landscapes.

Jettel died on 27 August 1901 in Lussingrande (now Veli Lošinj), before the start of an Adriatic study trip with the Archdruke. He was buried in the cemetery of Saint Anne in Trieste. In Ver Sacrum, the Secession named him "a great artist, a true friend and never to be forgotten."

His brother, Wladimir Eugen Eudard Jettel (1843–1910), was also a landscape painter; however, he was trained in Dresden.

== Honours ==
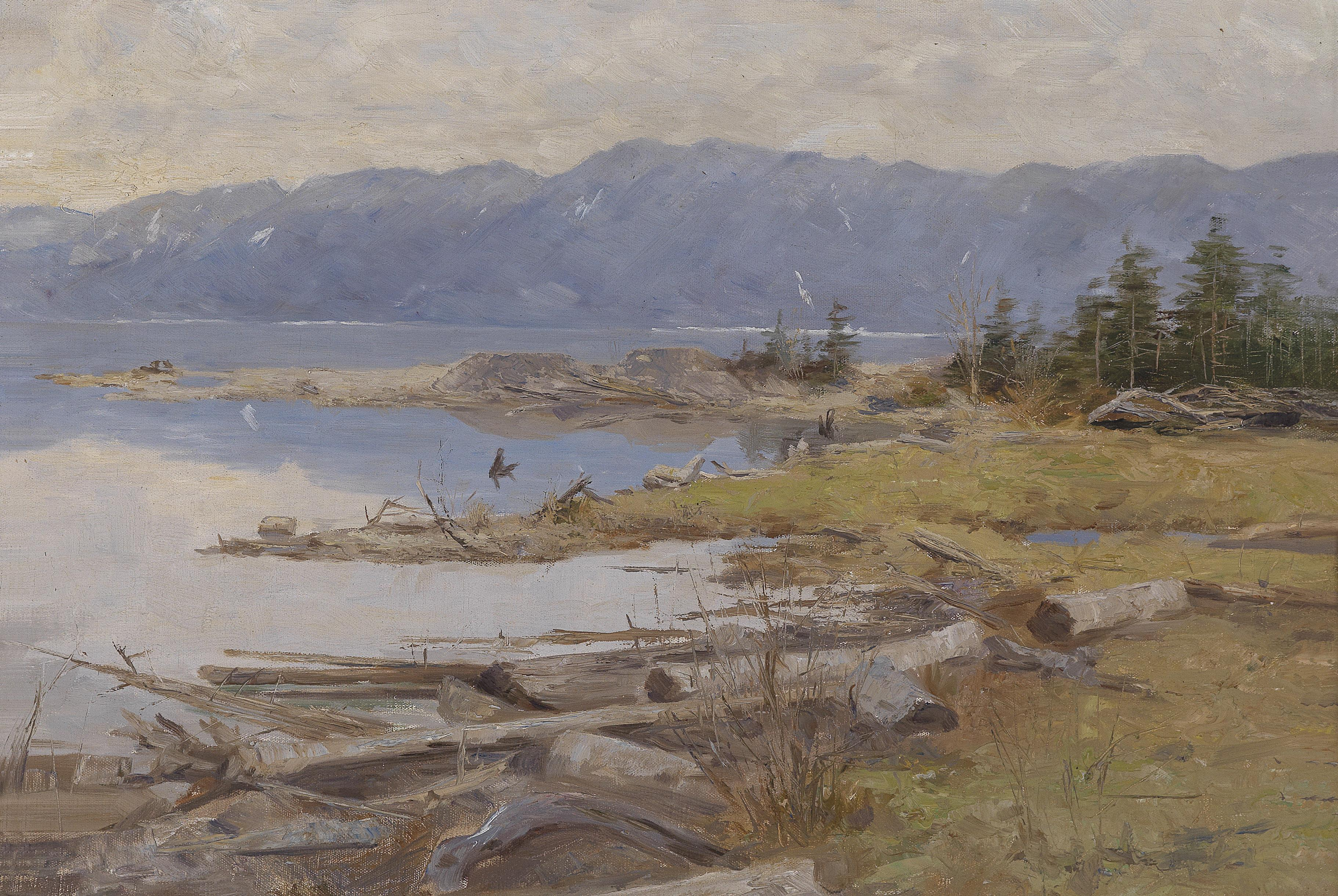
Mountain Lake Landscape (1861)

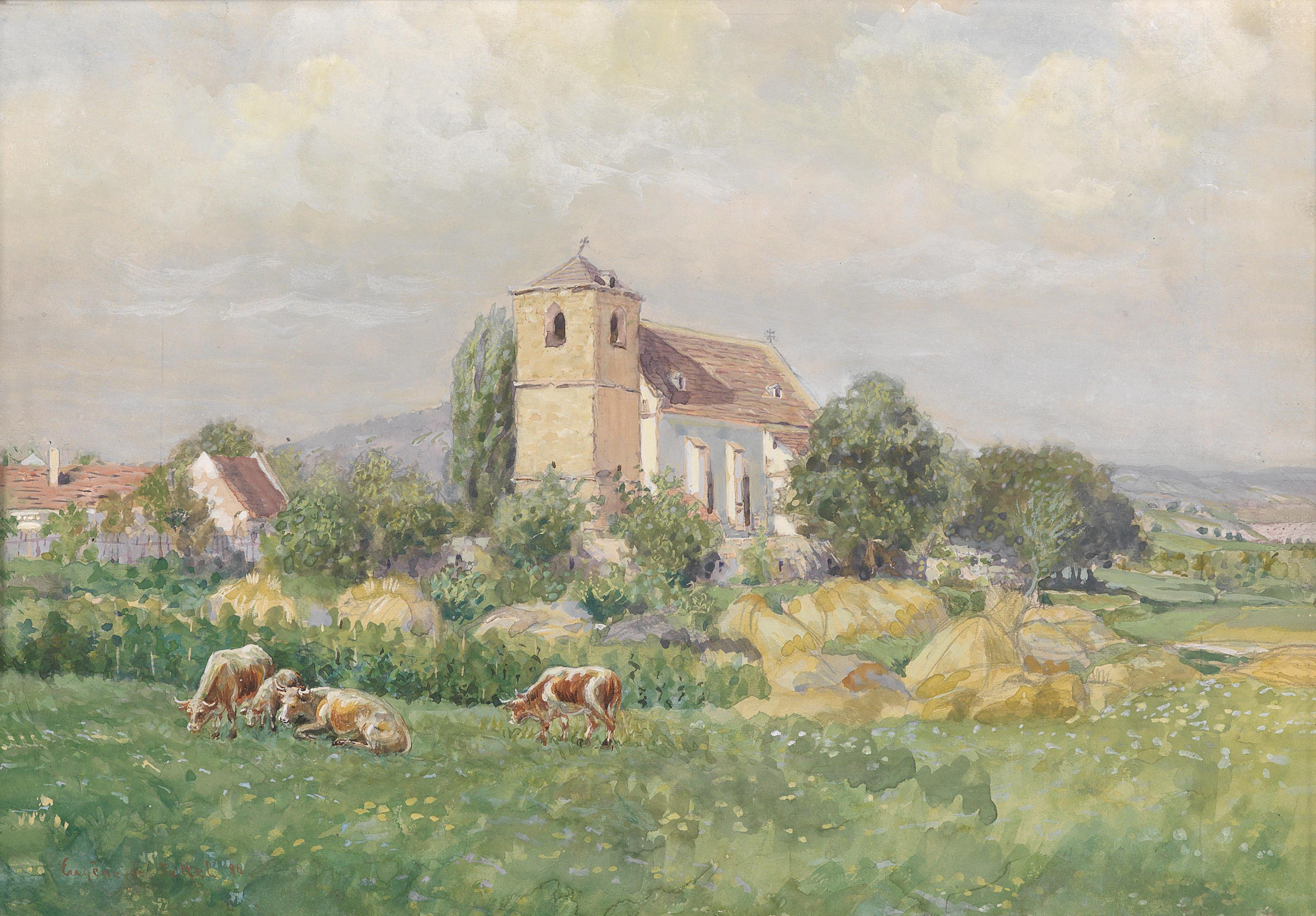
Church in Staatz (1896)

- Gold Medal, 1st Class in Munich, 1874; for the pictures Forest Landscape and Hintersee.
- Great Gold Medal in Vienna, 1877
- Gold Medal in Paris, 1889
- Gold Medal in Antwerp, 1893
- Gold Medal in Chicago, 1893
- First Class Medal in Antwerp, 1894 World Exhibition
- Great Gold Medal in Dresden, 1897
- Knight of the Légion d'honneur, 1898
- Eugen-Jettel-Weg (Eugen Jettel Way) in Hietzing, named in his honour in 1932

== Selected works ==
- Evening in the Harbour, 1882
- From the Forest of Fontainbleau
- Cottage Garden, 1892
- Tree Landscape, about 1861
- The Hintersee in Berchtesgaden, 1864
- Ducks on the River, 1890
- Riverbank in Hungary to 1871
- High Mountain, about 1868
- Dutch River Landscape, 1883
- Dutch Landscape with Peasant Plowing, 1870
- Motif at Szered in Hungary, 1871
- Prater game with Bathers, 1869
- Lakeshore, 1867
- Hungarian Landscape, 1871
- Torrent, 1860
- Village Road in Brittany, 1895
