= Kent Twitchell =

American muralist (born 1942)

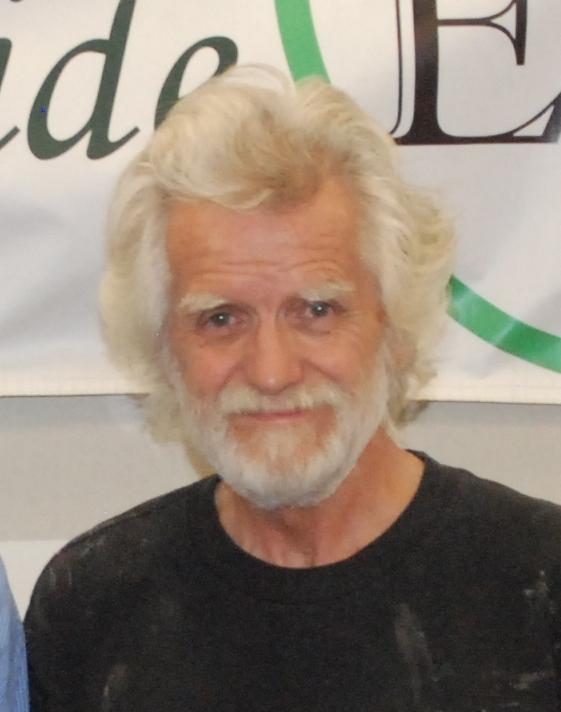
- Twitchell in 2013
- Born: August 17, 1942 (age 84); Lansing, MI
- Education: Otis College of Art and Design
- Occupation: Artist
- Years active: 1965–present

Kent Twitchell (born August 17, 1942, Lansing, Michigan) is an American muralist who is most active in Los Angeles. He is most famous for his larger-than-life mural portraits, often of celebrities and artists. His murals are realism not photorealism according to Twitchell.

== Biography ==
Twitchell's parents, Robert and Doris, were farmers like their parents and grandparents. Kent started doing art when he was three years old. His first mentor was his mother's brother, Angus Berry, who was an eccentric artist. As a kid all through high school he painted signs and lettered trucks for local businesses. He went to Dimondale High School (1957–59) and Everett High School (class of 1960.) He joined the United States Air Force right out of high school at age 17 and was stationed in London, England. He worked as a military artist and had top secret clearance until May 1965 when he was honorably discharged. He worked for J. C. Penney as a display artist (1965–66) in Atlanta, Georgia. Twitchell studied art at East Los Angeles College (AA, 1968), California State University, Los Angeles (BA, 1972), and the Otis College of Art and Design (MFA, 1977). He was active in the creation of the Mural Conservancy of Los Angeles and serves on its advisory board.

In 1980, Twitchell's murals to date, including Bride and Groom and The Freeway Lady, were featured extensively in a documentary, Mur Murs, directed by Agnès Varda.

In 1990 Twitchell married Pandora Seaton, the mother of his two children, Art and Aurora. In 1992, the year his son was born, a court awarded him damages for the destruction of The Freeway Lady. The mural was later repainted by Twitchell on the campus of Los Angeles Valley College. He was based in Echo Park, California for most of his career, until the 1994 Northridge earthquake destroyed his studio. Shortly thereafter, Twitchell and his family moved to Northern California.

In 1997, the muralist was brought in to create two large mural portraits on the wall of the California Theatre of the Performing Arts in San Bernardino. Twitchell considered painting either Wyatt Earp or Will Rogers, but settled on Rogers when discovering Will's last performance was in that theatre. He painted Rogers from the waist-up on the building's east and west facing exteriors, using the 1928 theater's towering flyspace. In 1998 he first completed Will Rogers as a stage cowboy on the east facing wall. In 1999 he completed another on the west facing wall, this one of Will Rogers in a suit. Together, Twitchell meant for them to show two sides of Will Roger's career. "Will Rogers Monument" is part of Twitchell's series that serve as cultural markers.

In 2008 Twitchell settled a lawsuit against the U.S. Government and 12 other defendants (Kent Twitchell v. West Coast General Corp et al.) for painting over his 70-foot-tall (21 m) landmark mural of Edward Ruscha, an important Los Angeles-based Pop artist. The settlement amount – $1.1 million – is believed to be the largest settlement ever under the seldom-invoked Federal Visual Artists Rights Act (VARA) or the California Art Preservation Act (CAPA). VARA and CAPA forbid desecration, alteration, or destruction of certain public works of art without prior notice to the artist to allow for removal.

Twitchell had a show in Los Angeles in April 2009 at the LOOK gallery entitled "Thriller: The King of Pop Meets the King of Cool: Exploring the Lost Works of Kent Twitchell." The exhibition included sketches, photos and drawings for "lost" murals, as well as one that was completed but never installed or shown to the public: Segments of his 100-foot-tall (30 m), 60-foot-wide (18 m) portrait of Michael Jackson, that Jackson had commissioned Twitchell to do in 1990 for the side of the former Barker Bros. building in Hollywood, now the El Capitan Theatre, and also in the show was a repaint of his 1971 2-story mural of Steve McQueen.

Michael Jackson worked closely with Twitchell for three years on the Smooth Criminal Mural project. After the 1994 scandal, the mural had been put on pause, but interest resparked after his death in 2009.

In November 2009 Twitchell painted two murals on two pieces of the Berlin wall for the 20-year anniversary of the fall of the Berlin Wall. One was the portrait of John Kennedy, the other Ronald Reagan. They depicted the US Presidents at the beginning and the fall of the Berlin wall. Twitchell was disappointed when only one piece could fit in the installation as per the organizers of the exhibit. Twitchell decided to display half of each piece in the exhibit which worked out perfectly.

In 2017, Twitchell repainted of his Ed Ruscha monument, which is now permanently on The Historic American Hotel in the Arts District of Downtown Los Angeles.

Twitchell has received honorary doctorate degrees from Biola University, Otis College of Art and Design, and California State University, Los Angeles. He currently sits on the board of trustees at Otis College of Art and Design, is on the Board of Advisors at the Biola University Art Department and is an MFA Mentor at Laguna College of Art and Design.

Twitchell's wife died at the age of 64 on June 13, 2018, from a complication with a blood thinner she was prescribed. He now lives in Long Beach, California in the Belmont Heights district. His son, artist Artie Twitchell assists him on all his projects and has been working with him on installing and restoring all of his murals.

== Well-known works ==
Murals
Title	Year	Location	Status
Will Rogers	1998-1999	California Theatre of the Performing Arts, San Bernardino, California	extant
Harbor Freeway Overture	1991–1993	Citicorp Plaza parking structure (exterior), 8th Street and the Harbor Freeway (110), Los Angeles, California	extant
L.A. Marathon Mural	1990	Northbound side of the San Diego Freeway (405), Inglewood, California, just past Century Boulevard; relocated and restored in late 2006 to southbound side of 5 Freeway just past Stadium Way exit	Covered in tagging then paint cover
The Word	1989–1990	Biola University Science Building (exterior), 13800 Biola Avenue, La Mirada, California	extant
Julius Erving (Dr. J)	1989	Ridge Avenue at Green Street, Philadelphia	extant
Ed Ruscha Monument	1978–1987	Job Corps Center, exterior, 1031 South Hill St., Los Angeles, California (between 11th St. and Olympic Boulevard)	Destroyed without authorization (painted over completely) on 2 June 2006 Repainted 2017.
111th Street Jesus	1984	Tiger Liquor Store (exterior), corner of Vermont Avenue at 111th Streets, Los Angeles, California	Painted over in 1999
The Watchers	1984	Barnsdall Park Junior Arts Center (exterior), 4814 Hollywood Boulevard, Los Angeles, California	extant
Seventh Street Altarpiece	1983–1984	Harbor Freeway (110), Los Angeles, California (both sides at 7th St. underpass)	destroyed, then moved to US 101 under Grand overpass, extant but barely visible under heavy tagging
Leaf	1981	1566 Ridge Crest Way, Monterey Park, California (near Monterey Pass Road)	Painted over
Six Los Angeles Artists	1979	Employment Development Department (exterior rear), 1220 Engracia Avenue, Torrance, California. Artists were Marta Chaffee Stang, Alonzo Davis, Paul Czirban, Oliver Nowlin, Eloy Torrez, and Wayanna Kato.	extant
Holy Trinity with Virgin	1978	Otis College of Art and Design (exterior) 2401 Wilshire Boulevard, Los Angeles, California (facing Carondelet, west side of campus)	extant
Bride and Groom	1972–1976	Monarch Bridle owner Carlos Ortiz in the Victor Clothing Company Building (exterior facing northeast) 240 South Broadway, Los Angeles, California (between 2nd and 3rd streets)	extant
The Freeway Lady	1974	Angeles Prince Hotel (exterior), 1255 West Temple Street, Los Angeles, California (visible from the Hollywood Freeway)	painted over in 1987, repainted in 2015 on the Student Service building at Los Angeles Valley College 5800 Fulton Ave, Valley Glen, California
Strother Martin Monument	1972	5200 Fountain Avenue at Kingsley Drive (exterior of southwest corner), Los Angeles, California	extant
Steve McQueen Monument	1971	Northwest corner dwelling at Union Avenue and 12th Street (exterior), Los Angeles, California	painted over completely; restored 2010
