= Galerie Sedelmeyer =

Former art gallery in Paris, France

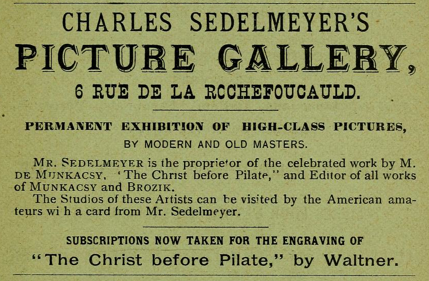
- Established: 1860s
- Location: 6 rue de La Rochefoucauld; Paris, France
- Type: Art gallery
- Owner: Charles Sedelmeyer

Galerie Sedelmeyer (English: Sedelmeyer Gallery), also known as Sedelmeyer Galleries, was an art gallery based in Paris, France.

== History ==
The gallery took its name from its owner, Charles Sedelmeyer, who was both an Austrian-born publisher and an art dealer. He was known to have amassed one of the most valuable collections of original pictures across Europe. Sedelmeyer moved from Vienna to Paris in 1866 and chose to set up a small gallery at 54 Rue du Faubourg-Montmartre, in close proximity to the renowned Hôtel Drouot auction house. Galerie Sedelmeyer moved its operations to 6 Rue de La Rochefoucauld in Paris by the Third French Republic.

By 1876, Sedelmeyer had already made his gallery a fixed location for displaying exceptional art, including both modern creations and works by Old Masters.

Hungarian painter Mihály Munkácsy's "Christ Before Pilate" was notably placed on display at the gallery in May 1881. In 1884, Sedelmeyer's gallery in Paris held an exhibition of a painting that Munkácsy had just completed titled "Christ on Calvary". The exhibition also included "The Gate of Franklin Expedition" by Julius von Payer, and a series of paintings by Austrian artists Václav Brožík, Eduard Charlemont, Eugen Jettel, and August von Pettenkofen.

Galerie Sedelmeyer held an exhibition of James Tissot's series "La Femme à Paris" (The Parisian Woman) from 19 April to 15 June 1885. 15 of Tissot's pictures were put on display in the gallery.

The gallery held the Exposition Sedelmyer in 1886. The gallery exhibition was made up of two parts, the modern artists and the Old Masters, featuring works by Brožík, Charles-François Daubigny, Narcisse Virgilio Díaz, Vojtěch Hynais, Eugen Jettel, Tito Lessi, Munkácsy, and more. French art critic Léon Roger-Milès wrote an article about the exhibition in Le Mémorial diplomatique.

During the winter of 1887, Sedelmeyer galleries in Paris hosted an exhibition of American pictures and drawings. It included over 400 works, overseen by American artists living in Paris.

On 1 July 1889, the gallery was set to auction a collection of modern and Old Masters' paintings, watercolors, and drawings, which had been curated by the French art collector Eugène Secrétan.

In 1890, the 'Catalogue of the Celebrated Collection of Paintings by Modern and Ancient Masters Formed by the Late Senator Prosper Crabbe of Brussels' was published by Galerie Sedelmeyer. Crabbe, known as both a wealthy Belgian politician and an art aficionado, had his extensive collection of modern paintings displayed before they were auctioned on 12 June 1890. The modern section of the collection featured works by Jean-Baptiste-Camille Corot, Alexandre-Gabriel Decamps, Eugène Delacroix, Diaz, Jules Dupré, Eugène Fromentin, Théodore Géricault, Jan August Hendrik Leys, Ernest Meissonier, Jean-François Millet, Théodore Rousseau, Alfred and Joseph Stevens, Constant Troyon, and Florent Willems. Among the older pieces were those by François Boucher, Jean-Baptiste Greuze, Nicolas de Largillière, Jean-Marc Nattier, Louis Tocqué, Francesco Guardi, Frans Hals, Paul Potter, Rembrandt, Jacob van Ruisdael, Gerard ter Borch, and six by Peter Paul Rubens. The Crabbe auction at the Sedelmeyer Gallery drew a significant crowd of European and American collectors including Joseph Pulitzer. A French collector notably outbid an American for Troyon's "La Vache Blanche." Notable sales included Corot's "Le Matin" for 63,000 francs, Delacroix's "La Chasse au Tigre" for 76,000 francs, Meissonier's "Le Guide" for 177,000 francs, and many others. Among the old masters, Rembrandt's "Portrait d'un Amiral" fetched 106,500 francs, while Rubens's "La Sainte Famille" sold for 132,000 francs. The total sales from the auction amounted to 1,589,000 francs.

The Parisian gallery held the Exhibition of Marie-Antoinette and Her Time ("Exposition de Marie-Antoinette et Son Temps") in 1894. The catalogue preface was done by French art historian Germain Bapst. That year, the gallery initiated the publication of illustrated catalogues, each detailing a set of 100 paintings by old masters from the Dutch, Flemish, Italian, French, and English schools in their possession. Between 1894 and 1897, four catalogues were published. By 1897, the Sedelmeyer Gallery contained around 1500 original pictures, including over 800 works by Old Masters.

Ortgies' Galleries on Fifth Avenue in New York City showcased paintings from the Sedelmeyer Gallery in April 1898. The collection featured Old Masters from the early English school and modern European school. They had been brought to the United States by Eugène Fischhof, the son-in-law of Charles Sedelmeyer. Among the notable English artworks were "Portrait of Mrs. Coxe" by John Opie, "Lake Thun, Switzerland" by J. M. W. Turner, and pieces from John Constable, Thomas Gainsborough, and Sir Joshua Reynolds. The French collection featured Jean-Baptiste-Camille Corot's "Lake Nemi," Ernest Meissonier's "The Vedette," along with various sketches by Mariano Fortuny.

The gallery displayed an altarpiece titled "Pala Colonna" by the Italian painter Raphael, which sold to American financier and art collector J. P. Morgan for over 2 million francs in April 1901. In addition to the Raphael piece, Morgan purchased four other paintings from Galerie Sedelmeyer on the same day, spending a total of $600,000.

In 1908, at the Sedelmeyer Galleries, there was an exhibition dedicated to portraits by the early English school painters, featuring works by Sir Joshua Reynolds, Thomas Gainsborough, Thomas Lawrence, George Romney, Henry Raeburn, John Hoppner, and more. A portrait of Miss Elizabeth Tighe, painted by Romney, sold for 160,000 francs.

== See also ==
- Charles Sedelmeyer

== Gallery ==
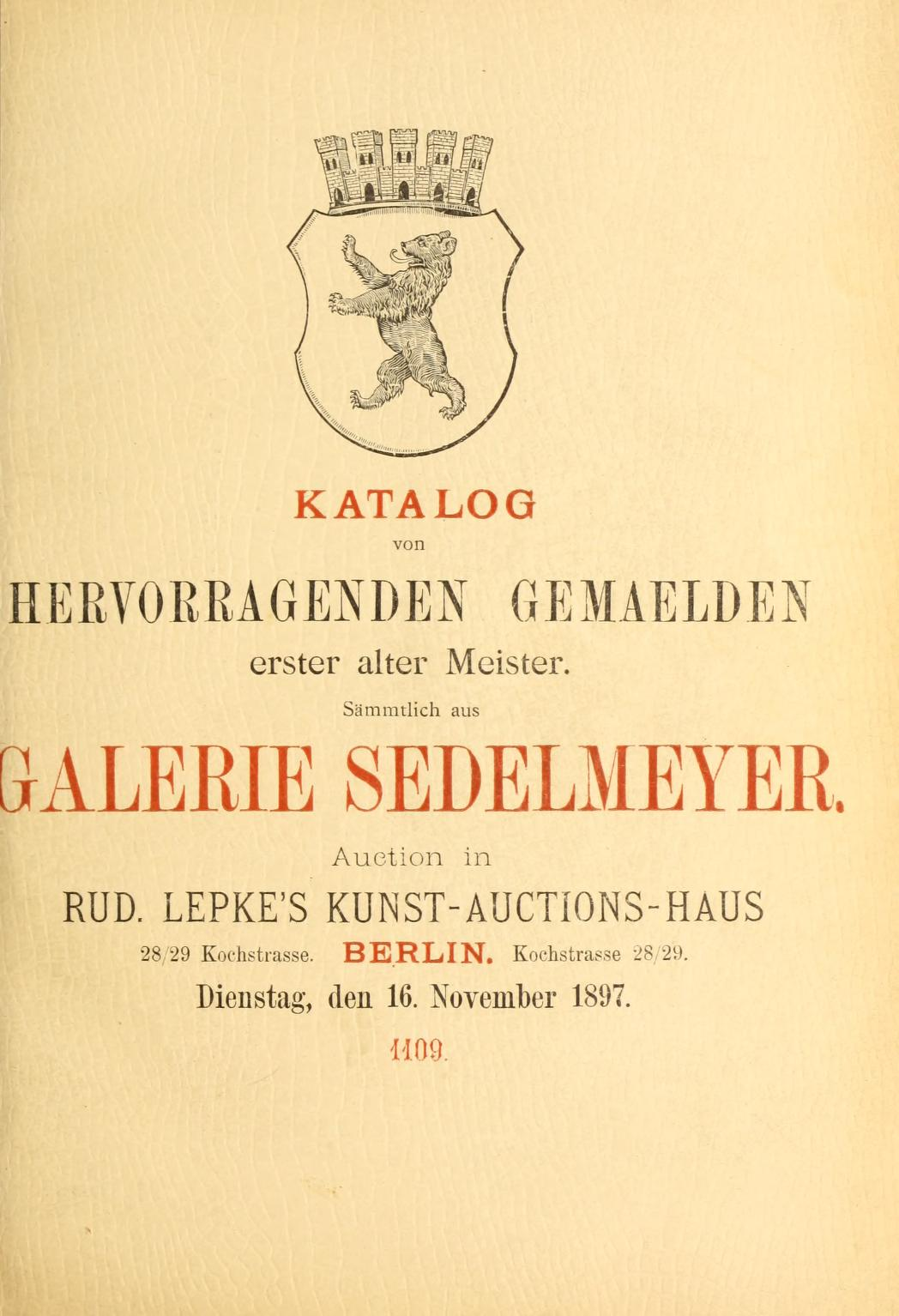
