= Moral rights =

Copyrights related to attribution, anonymity, and integrity of the work

Moral rights are rights of creators of copyrighted works generally recognized in civil law jurisdictions and, to a lesser extent, in some common law jurisdictions.

The moral rights include the right of attribution, the right to have a work published anonymously or pseudonymously, and the right to the integrity of the work. The preserving of the integrity of the work allows the author to object to alteration, distortion, or mutilation of the work that is "prejudicial to the author's honor or reputation". Anything else that may detract from the artist's relationship with the work even after it leaves the artist's possession or ownership may bring these moral rights into play. Moral rights are distinct from any economic rights tied to copyrights. Even if an artist has assigned their copyright rights to a work to a third party, they still maintain the moral rights to the work.

Moral rights were first recognized in France and Germany, before they were included in the Berne Convention for the Protection of Literary and Artistic Works in 1928. Canada recognizes moral rights (droits moraux) in its Copyright Act (Loi sur le droit d'auteur). The United States became a signatory to the convention in 1989, and incorporated a version of moral rights under its copyright law, codified in Title 17 of the U.S. Code. The Berne convention is not a self-executing treaty, and the Berne Convention Implementation Act of 1988 excludes the US from the moral rights section.

Some jurisdictions allow for the waiver of moral rights. In the United States, the Visual Artists Rights Act of 1990 (VARA) recognizes moral rights, but applies only to a narrow subset of works of visual art. "For the purposes of VARA, visual art includes paintings, drawings, prints, sculptures, and photographs, existing in a single copy or a limited edition of 200 signed and numbered copies or fewer". A photograph must be taken only for exhibition purposes to be recognized under this subcategory. Independent art is not a focus of this waiver, for VARA only works in protecting artwork that can be considered as having "recognized stature"; Some of the items that are voided from VARA's protection include posters, maps, globes, motion pictures, electronic publications, and applied art. The VARA grants artists two specific rights: the right of attribution, and the right of integrity. The right of attribution allows an author to enforce the attribution of their work, prevent the misattribution of their work to another author, and permits the author to retain anonymous or pseudo-anonymous ownership of the work. The right of integrity does its best to prevent distortion or modification of their work, easing an artists' worries surrounding negative defamation directly applied to their work affecting their own personal, creative, or professional reputation through misrepresentation.

In the United States, moral rights are not transferable, and end only with the life of the author. Authors may, however, waive their moral rights if this is done in writing.

Some jurisdictions like Austria differentiate between narrow and wide moral rights. Whilst the former is about integrity of the work, the latter limits usages, which may harm the author's integrity. Some copyright timestamp services allow an author to publish allowed and disallowed usage intentions to prevent a violation of such wider moral rights.

== Berne Convention ==
Through the Rome Revision of the Berne Convention in 1928, the Berne Convention accepted two forms of moral rights; paternity and integrity. These rights are included in Article 6bis of the Berne Convention as follows:

Independent of the author's economic rights, and even after the transfer of the said rights, the author shall have the right to claim authorship of the work and to object to any distortion, modification of, or other derogatory action in relation to the said work, which would be prejudicial to the author's honor or reputation.

== Worldwide situation ==
=== Europe ===
In most of Europe, it is not possible for authors to assign or even broadly waive their moral rights. This follows a tradition in European copyright itself, which is regarded as an item of property which cannot be sold, but only licensed. The author can agree to waive them to a limited extent (and such terms are very common in contracts in Europe). There may also be a requirement for the author to 'assert' these moral rights before they can be enforced. In many books, for example, this is done on the copyright page alongside the British Library/Library of Congress data and other copyright information.

=== Canada ===
Section 14.1 of Canada's Copyright Act protects the moral rights of authors. The moral rights cannot be assigned, but can be waived contractually. Many publishing contracts in Canada now contain a standard moral right waiver.

Moral rights in Canada were famously exercised in the case of Snow v. The Eaton Centre Ltd. In this case Toronto Eaton Centre, a large shopping mall, had commissioned the artist Michael Snow for a sculpture of Canada Geese. Snow successfully stopped Eaton's from decorating the geese with bows at Christmas.

=== China ===
Article 20 of the Copyright Law of the People's Republic of China (1990) provides unlimited term of protection of the rights of authorship, alteration, and integrity of an author. As Article 55 of the same Law provides retroactive protection of unexpired term on the date of entry into force of this Law, the Chinese perpetual moral rights are retroactive as well. The 2001 version retains this provision and the original Article 55 becomes Article 59.

=== Ghana ===
Art. 18, Copyright Act, 2005 provides perpetual moral rights. The moral rights in Art. 6 are for proper attribution and against any distortion, mutilation or other modification of the work where that act would be or is prejudicial to the reputation of the author or where the work is discredited by the act.

=== Hong Kong ===
Moral Rights is specified under Copyright Ordinance (Chapter 528) Division IV, starting from section 89. Author of computer program does not have Moral Rights (section 91). Moral Rights cannot be transferred unless on the death of moral rights holder (section 105 and 106).

=== India ===
Moral rights are recognised under section 57 of India copyright act. Section 57 refers to Author's Special rights. It states:

- (1) Independently of author's copyright, and even after the assignment either wholly or partially of the said copyright, the author of the work shall have the right to claim authorship of the work as well as the right to restrain, or claim damages in respect of
  - (a) any distortion, mutilation or other modification of the said work; or
  - (b) any other action in relation to the said work which would be prejudicial to his honour or reputation.
- (2) The right conferred upon an author of a work by sub section (1), other than the right to claim authorship of the work, may be exercised by the legal representatives of the author.

The issue of moral rights was discussed in Amar Nath Sehgal v Union of India & Ors (CS/OS/No.2074/1992 decided on 21 February 2005. Court of Mr. Justice Pradeep Nandrajog). The case pertained to a mural that was commissioned in 1957 by the Government of India during construction of Vigyan Bhavan at New Delhi. The mural in question was made of bronze had span of 140 feet sweep of 40 feet. The mural remained on display and was much appreciated till pulled down in 1979 and then consigned to storerooms of Union of India. Delhi High Court specifically referred to the Berne Convention in delivering judgement. The Court also awarded damages of ₹500,000 and also decreed in favor of the Amar Nath Sehgal that he would have an absolute right to recreate the mural at any place and right to sale the same.

The Court accepted the existence of moral rights despite the work being commissioned work and copyright had passed over to union of India and suit being brought 13 years after the said act (defense of limitations as pleaded by Government was rejected by the court).

=== Macao ===
Article 41 of the Decree-Law n.o 43/99/M provides inalienable, unrenounceable and imprescriptible author's personal rights.

=== Taiwan ===
In Taiwan, the Copyright Act has provided authors' perpetual moral rights with regard of attribution and protection against alteration in bad faith, even if the works are in the public domain, as follows:

- Article 25 of the Copyright Act 1928
- Article 21 of the Copyright Act 1944
- Article 21 of the Copyright Act 1948, unchanged from the 1944 Act (The effective jurisdiction of the Republic of China became limited to Taiwan Area in 1949.)
- Article 21 of the Copyright Act 1964, unchanged from the 1948 Act
- Article 26 of the Copyright Act 1985
- Article 26 of the Copyright Act 1990, unchanged from the 1985 Act
- Section 3, Articles 15-21 of the Copyright Act 1992, with the Article unchanged in the subsequent versions of the Copyright Act

=== Singapore ===
In Singapore, the Copyright Act 2021 which came into effect in November 2021 provides for selected moral rights of authors and performers including the right to be acknowledged, right not to be falsely identified, amongst others.

=== United States ===
Moral rights traditionally have not been recognized in American law. Some elements of moral rights do exist in the United States, but are usually protected through specific contract provisions between parties, or else through individual states' laws or the derivative work rights in U.S. copyright law. U.S. copyright law emphasizes protection of financial reward over protection of creative attribution. The exclusive rights tradition in the United States is inconsistent with the notion of moral rights as it was constituted in the Civil Code tradition stemming from post-Revolutionary France. When the United States acceded to the Berne Convention, it stipulated that the convention's "moral rights" provisions were addressed sufficiently by other statutes, such as laws covering slander and libel.

Some individual states have moral rights laws, particularly pertaining to visual art and artists (see e.g. California Art Preservation Act, Artists Authorship Rights Act (New York)). However, it is unclear if these laws, or portions thereof, are preempted by federal laws, such as the Visual Artists Rights Act.

In Gilliam v. American Broadcasting, the Monty Python comedy troupe made a claim of "mutilation" (akin to a moral rights claim) in 1975 in legal proceedings against American TV network ABC for airing re-edited versions of Monty Python's Flying Circus. However, the case was primarily decided on the basis of whether the BBC was licensed in such a way as to allow ABC to edit the videos (paragraph 20).

==== Visual Artists Rights Act ====
The Visual Artists Rights Act of 1990 grants authors of a "work of visual art" – e.g. photographs, paintings, sculptures, etc. – the non-transferable right to

- claim authorship
- prevent the use of one's name on any work the author did not create
- prevent use of one's name on any work that has been distorted, mutilated, or modified in a way that would be prejudicial to the author's honor or reputation
- prevent any intentional distortion, mutilation, or modification that would prejudice the author's honor or reputation
- prevent the destruction of a work of art if it is of "recognized stature"

These rights are distinct from any rights of copyright and ownership of a copy of the work.

==== Adaptation right ====
Copyright holders have the right to control adaptations, or the preparation of "derivative works". This right is given under copyright law. See 17 U.S.C. § 106.

==== Lanham Act ====
Section 43 of the Lanham Act governs false and misleading advertising, and can apply in some instances to attribution of protected works. However, it cannot be used to create moral rights for works outside of the Act. See Dastar v. Twentieth Century Fox.

By the start of the twentieth century, U.S. decisions on unfair competition found that representing as the author's work a version of the work that substantially departed from the original was a cause of action. Section §43(a) of the Lanham Act, which protects brands and trademarks, also provides similar protection to laws based on moral rights. For any goods or services, it bans false designation of origin or a false description or representation. In Gilliam v. American Broadcasting the British comedy group Monty Python took action against the ABC network for broadcasting versions of their programs which had been correctly attributed to them but had been extensively edited, in part to remove content that their audience might consider offensive or obscene. The judgement of the United States Court of Appeals for the Second Circuit was in favor of Monty Python, finding the cuts might be an "actionable mutilation" that violated the Lanham Act.

==== Courtesy of non-attribution ====
Authors occasionally wish to distance themselves from work they have been involved with, some to the point of not wishing to be recognized as the work's author. One way they may do this is by signing the work under a pseudonym. Alan Smithee was a traditional, collective pseudonym used in Hollywood between 1968 and 1999 by discontented film directors who no longer wanted to be credited. This courtesy was not always extended, however. The director of Highlander II, Russell Mulcahy, wanted his name removed after the completion bond company took over film production, but he was contractually obliged not to impugn the film and he was told that using a pseudonym would impugn it.

If the work was unfinished, sometimes the original author will choose a pseudonym as permission for the copyright holder to do whatever they wish to finish and market the unwanted work, cutting ties from the product.

=== Summary table ===
Legend:

- ∞: infinity (to identify perpetual moral rights, though countries and areas may have different wordings in their laws and regulations)
- = economic rights: equal to or same as economic rights

Countries and areas	Terms of moral rights	References
Albania	∞ forever = economic rights (works copyrighted based on publication and creation dates)	Arts. 4, 17–21, Law no. 7564 of 19 April 1992, as modified by Law no. 7923 of 19 May 1995
Algeria	∞ inalienable, cannot be waived	Art. 21, Ordinance No. 03-05 on Copyright and Related Rights (19 Joumada El Oula 1424 corresponding to July 19, 2003)
Andorra	= economic rights	Arts. 6, 18 Law on Copyright and Related Rights of 1999
Angola	∞ inalienable	Art. 18, Law on Author's Rights (No. 4/90 of 10 March 1990)
Antigua and Barbuda	= economic rights	s. 18, Copyright Act, 2002
Armenia	∞ unlimited	Art. 12, Law on Copyright and Related Rights of June 15, 2006
Austria	Life + 70 years	§§19-21 UrhG
Australia	= economic rights	s. 195AM, Copyright Act 1968
Azerbaijan	∞ unlimited	Arts. 14, 27, Law on Copyright and Related Rights of 5 June 1996
Barbados	= economic rights Life + 20 calendar years (rights against false attribution)	s. 18(1), 18(2), Copyright, Act, 05/03/1998, No. 4
Belarus	∞ unlimited	Art. 15,
Belgium	∞ inalienable	Arts. 1(2), 7, Law on Copyright and Neighboring Rights (of June 30, 1994, as amended by the Law of April 3, 1995)
Brazil	∞ inalienable, cannot be waived, assumed by heirs	Arts. 24 and §1º, 27, Copyright Law and Related Rights (Federal Law n. 9,610/98).
Bulgaria	= economic rights, assumed by heirs, except for the rights of attribution	Art. 17 in relation with Arts. 27-30 of the Authors Rights and Related Rights Act
Canada	= economic rights, may be waived	Arts. 14.1, 14.2, Copyright Act (R.S.C., 1985, c. C-42)
China	∞ perpetual and retroactive	Arts. 10, 20, Copyright Law of the People's Republic of China
Denmark	= Life of author + 70 calendar years (∞ unlimited if the use of the work infringes cultural interests)	Section 63(1), 75, The Consolidated Act on Copyright 2010. Consolidation Act No. 202 of 2/27/2010
Egypt	∞ permanent, imprescriptible, and non-assignable	Art. 143, Law No. 82 of 2002 Pertaining to the Protection of Intellectual Property Rights, Copyrights and Neighboring Rights
Finland	∞ inalienable except to an extent that is limited and restricted in scope	Section 3, Copyright Law
France	∞ perpetual, inalienable, and imprescriptible	Art. L121-1, Intellectual Property Code
Ghana	∞ perpetual	Arts. 6, 18, Copyright Act, 2005, No. 690
Hong Kong	= economic, cannot be waived, must be asserted	s. 89–114, Copyright Ordinance, Chapter 528, Division IV
India	∞ perpetual	s. 57, Copyright Act, 1957
Indonesia	∞ eternally inherent to the Author	Art.5 (1)
Italy	∞ perpetual and inalienable	Arts. 22–23, Legge 22 aprile 1941, n. 633
Macao	∞ perpetual, inalienable, and imprescriptible	Arts. 7(d), 41, Decree-Law n.o 43/99/M of August 16, 1999
North Macedonia	∞ unlimited	Arts. 61(2), 75, Author's right and related rights, Act, 31/08/2010, No. 115
Norway	irrevocable	Intellectual Property Act (Act on copyright to intellectual property etc.). (2018). § 5. (in Norwegian)
Poland	∞ perpetual, inalienable, and non-assignable	Art. 16
Puerto Rico	personality right, non-assignable, cannot be waived except right for integrity, endures lifetime of author and seventy (70) years after their death, or until the work enters the public domain, whichever occurs first	Ley de Derechos Morales de Autor de Puerto Rico, Ley Núm 55-2012
Moldova	∞ inalienable, assumed by heirs	Art. 9
Netherlands	= economic rights	Art. 25(2)
Oman	∞ perpetual, inalienable, and non-assignable	Art. 5 The Law For the Protection of Copyright and Neighbouring Rights, Royal Decree 65/2008
Singapore	= economic, can be waived	Part 7 Copyright Act 2021
South Africa	= economic, can be waived, non-assignable	Art. 20 Copyright Act No.98 of 1978
United Kingdom	= economic, can be waived, must be asserted	Copyright, Designs and Patents Act 1988 (c. 48), Chapter IV, ss. 77–89
United States	Only applies to works of visual art limited to the life of the author(s) to the end of the calendar year of death of the last author(s), can be waived	

== See also ==
- Personality rights
- Protection of Classics
