= California Resale Royalty Act =

The California Resale Royalty Act (Civil Code section 986), which went into effect on January 1, 1977, entitles artists to a royalty payment upon the resale of their art if the transaction takes place in California or the seller is based in the state. It was the only law of its kind implemented in the United States. On July 6, 2018, the U.S. Court of Appeals for the Ninth Circuit ruled that the California Resale Royalties Act was preempted by the Copyright Act of 1976. Now, only works resold from January 1, 1977, to January 1, 1978, when the Copyright Act became effective, are eligible for the royalty payment.

== Conditions for resale royalty payments ==
- The artist at the time of the sale is a United States citizen or has been a California resident for at least two years.
- The seller resides in California or the sale takes place in California.
- The work is an original painting, drawing, sculpture or original work of art in glass.
- The work is sold by the seller for more money than she or he paid.
- The work is sold for a gross price of more than $1,000 or is exchanged for one or more works of art or for a combination of cash, other property, and one or more works of fine art with a fair market value of more than $1,000.
- The work is sold during the artist's lifetime or within 20 years of the artist's death.

The act does not apply if:

- The sale is the initial sale of the work and the legal title of the work at the time of such initial sale is vested in the artist.
- The resale of fine art is by an art dealer to a purchaser within 10 years after the initial sale by the artist to an art dealer, provided that all intervening sales are between art dealers.
- The sale consists of a work of stained glass artistry permanently attached to real property and it was sold as part of the sale of the real property to which it was attached.

== Requirements under the act for qualifying works ==
When the sale of a work meets the conditions outlined above, a seller must pay the artist 5% of the resale price. If the artist is deceased, the payment goes to the artist's estate or heirs. It is the seller's obligation to locate the artist within 90 days of the sale. If the artist or heirs cannot be located, the seller is to make payment to the California Arts Council, who will hold the collected payments for up to 7 years for the artist. In the event that the Council is unable to locate a particular artist or the artist fails to claim the collected royalties in that time period, the funds collected are used by the California Arts Council for Art in Public Places. The artist's right to receive the royalty cannot be waived in full; it can only be modified by written contract providing for a royalty payment in excess of the 5% of resale value that is required by the Act.

== History of the resale right ==
California's Resale Royalty Act was signed into law in 1976. The resale right has its origins in the French law droit de suite, first enacted in 1920, which provided French artists the right to receive a royalty from resales of their work. The droite de suite reflects both the idea that artists have certain moral rights in their works (such as the inalienable right to be associated with their works) and the economic concern that artists often are unable to benefit from the full value of their works, where they have low bargaining power in initial sales or where their works appreciate significantly in value after the first sale. As of 2012, over 60 countries across the world recognize some version of the resale right.

=== Berne Convention ===
The Berne Convention for the Protection of Literary and Artistic Works of 1886 included a droite de suite provision in Article 14ter in its 1948 revision. This article provided for a general recognition of a resale right among signatory countries, but included the stipulation that protection provided by such recognition "may be claimed in a country of the Union only if legislation in the country to which the author belongs so permits, and to the extent permitted by the country where this protection is claimed."

=== United States ===
Currently, California is the only state that recognizes the resale right. The Copyright Office conducted a study, published in 1992, evaluating the nature of the resale right and the possibility of adopting a federal droite de suite. The Copyright Office concluded in the report that there were not adequate economic or copyright policy justifications to warrant adopting droite de suite at the federal level. The report did indicate that should the EU harmonize its droit de suite laws and extend the resale right to all member states, Congress may at that point revisit the resale right issue.

Legislation was proposed in both the Senate (S.2000) and the House (H.R. 3688) in December 2011 that would provide for a national resale royalty right. The Equity for Visual Artists Act of 2011 (EVAA) would provide for a 7% royalty to be collected from sales of certain works of art where the sale price exceeded $10,000. Half of this payment would go to the artist or successor in copyright, and half would go towards an escrow account to support U.S. non-profit museums. Both pieces of legislation are currently in committee. In conjunction with the consideration of the legislation, in September 2012 Congress published a Notice of Inquiry requesting comments from the public on factual and policy matters relating to a possible federal resale royalty right.

== Legal challenges ==
=== Constitutionality as applied to out-of-state sales ===
The Resale Royalty Act came under legal scrutiny when, in October 2011, a group of artists and their heirs filed class action suits against auction houses Christie's and Sotheby's, and auction site eBay, for failure of those brokers to pay royalties per the Resale Act. In a decision on May 17, 2012, in the United States District Court for the Central District of California, Judge Jacqueline H. Nguyen dismissed the suits on the grounds that the Resale Royalty Act violated the Commerce Clause of the United States Constitution, and was therefore invalid as law (Estate of Graham, et al, v. Sotheby's Inc.).

The Commerce Clause has been interpreted by the Supreme Court as not only affirmatively granting to Congress the power to regulate commerce among the states, but also, by negative implication, prohibiting the states from unjustifiably discriminating against or burdening the flow of interstate commerce. A state regulation violates the Commerce clause where it "directly controls commerce occurring wholly outside the boundaries of a State."

Judge Nguyen found that where the act regulates any transaction in which the seller resides in California, regardless of the location of the sale, buyer, or artist, the Resale Royalty Act "explicitly regulates applicable sales of fine art occurring wholly outside California." The Court cited the example of a California resident placing a painting by a New York artist for sale with Sotheby's in New York, where at the subsequent auction the painting is bought by a New York resident. In this instance, the California law requires the New York company to withhold the amount of the royalty from the sale price, and either locate and pay the artist in New York or remit payment to the California Arts Council should the artist not be located. Further, the Act permits the New York artist to sue the New York Sotheby's under California law should the auction house fail to collect and remit the applicable royalty to the artist.

In 2015, an eleven-judge en banc panel of the Court of Appeals for the Ninth Circuit affirmed, holding that applying the Act to out-of-state sales made by a California resident was unconstitutional. The court struck the clause "the seller resides in California or" from the Act, declining to rule on whether the Act could otherwise be applied to sales made within California. In 2016, the U.S. Supreme Court declined certiorari, leaving the Ninth Circuit decision in place.

=== Preemption ===
In April 2016, another federal judge, Michael W. Fitzgerald, held the entire act to be preempted by section 301 of the Copyright Act of 1976. That ruling was appealed to the Ninth Circuit, with initial briefs filed on March 9, 2017. Oral argument was held on April 10, 2018. On July 6, 2018, the Ninth Circuit nullified the California Resale Royalties Act. Now, only works resold from January 1, 1977 to January 1, 1978, when the Copyright Act became effective, are eligible for the royalty payment. The court ruled that royalty claims made after January 1, 1978 "were expressly pre-empted" by the Copyright Act—which does not recognize an artist's right to resale royalties.

== See also ==
- California Arts Council
- Commerce Clause
- Droit de suite
- First-sale doctrine
- Resale Rights Directive, a directive addressing similar subject matter in the European Union
