= California Art Preservation Act =

California artists' moral rights law

The California Art Preservation Act (CAPA) is a 1979 California law that provides legal protection for artists' moral rights by prohibiting the alteration or destruction of their artwork without their consent. The law has since been amended in part. The law is codified at California Civil Code § 987. The California Art Preservation Act was the first major law to specifically address artists' rights in the United States.

Portions of the law may overlap with the provisions of the Visual Artists Rights Act, in which case the California law is preempted by the federal law.

== Rights under CAPA ==
The Act exclusively grants artists whose work qualifies as fine art under the statute the following rights:

- the right to claim authorship of their work
- the right to prevent any modification of their works of fine art
- the right to prevent the destruction of their artwork

The rights granted under the Act exist for the lifetime of the artist plus 50 years after their death. Upon an artist's death, their rights under the Act transfer to their heir or named representative. An artist may waive these rights through express written waiver.

To protect these rights, CAPA provides for civil penalties, including both actual damages and punitive damages, and injunctive relief for the intentional or grossly negligent mutilation or destruction of the artwork. This protection includes any damage caused by the gross negligence of framers or art restorers.

An artist who wants to bring suit for damage to their artwork must file a claim within three years of the act that damaged their piece or within one year of discovery of the damage (whichever time period is longer).

=== Covered works ===
Fine art is defined in the statute as any original painting, sculpture, or drawing that is "of recognized quality." "Recognized quality" is determined on a case-by-case basis by opinions of expert witnesses including artists, art dealers, art collectors, and art museum curators. Murals qualify as paintings and are entitled to protection under the statute.

Fine art, as used in the law, does not include works prepared for "commercial use" by the purchaser. "Commercial use" is fine art created under a contract for use in advertising or marketing in both print and electronic media. The Act provides an exception to artwork covered under this statute if the artwork is attached to a building (like a permanently fixed sculpture or mural). In those cases, if the artwork cannot be removed without substantial damage or destroying the piece, the artist's rights are considered to be waived unless the owner of the building has previously signed a written agreement with the artist wherein the artist expressly reserves their rights as it pertains to the specific artwork attached to the building.

== Legislative History ==
Senator Alan Sieroty sponsored the Act, which was introduced to the California Senate on March 21, 1979. It was passed on July 19, 1979 and went into effect on January 1, 1980. Any alteration to or destruction of fine art prior to January 1, 1980 does not fall within the parameters of the law.

Prior to the enactment of CAPA, there was no existing law in California that protected an artist against the alteration or destruction of an artwork once ownership of the piece (through sale or gift) had been transferred to another person.

=== Legislative Intent ===
The California Legislature intended for the California Art Preservation Act to protect an artist's interest in preserving their work as it was created. With this intent, the Legislature found that art was an "expression of the artist's personality" and that any alteration or destruction of that art therefore damaged the artist's reputation. The Legislature additionally found that protection and preservation of fine art was in the public's interest as a means of preserving the "integrity of cultural and artistic creations."

== Application ==
=== Limits of CAPA ===
CAPA's application is limited to acts of mutilation or destruction that happened within the state of California. There is no remedy for simple negligence. A statue that has been relocated or placed in storage but not destroyed or mutilated does not qualify under the Act. A member of the public may not bring a suit on an artist's behalf.

=== Examples of application ===
- Kent Twitchell won the largest settlement ever under Visual Artists Rights Act (VARA) and CAPA for $1.1 million against the US Government and 12 other defendants. His mural of Ed Ruscha was painted over without his knowledge or consent.
- The East Los Streetscapers won a settlement against Shell Oil Company in 1991 after their mural Filling Up on Ancient Energies (1980) was destroyed without their notification.

== See also ==
- In 1988, the destruction of the David Hockney mural painted on the swimming pool at the Hollywood Roosevelt Hotel was prevented by California State Assembly Bill 2740. In A.B. 2740, the Legislature explicitly noted that the destruction of the mural would go against the intent of the California Art Preservation Act in protecting the public's interest in "cultural and artistic creations."
