= Charles Sedelmeyer =

Austrian and French art dealer, collector, and publisher

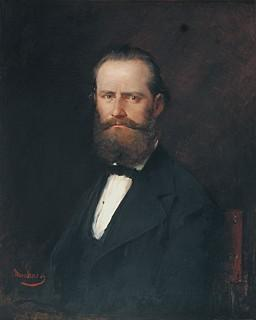
Charles Sedelmeyer

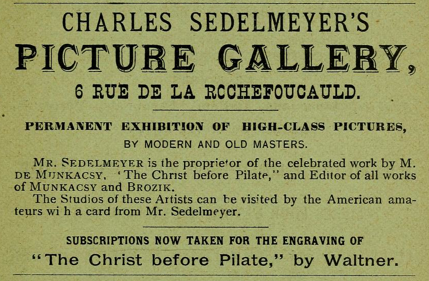
Advertisement for Sedelmeyer's Picture Gallery, Paris, 1882

Charles Sedelmeyer (30 April 1837, Vienna – 9 August 1925, Paris) was an Austrian and French art dealer, collector, and publisher active in Paris from 1866, with premises at 6 rue de la Rochefoucauld.

He is credited with popularising the Dutch artist Jan van Goyen in France. Sedelmeyer assessed the American market as important enough to send his Rubens Atalanta and Meleager from the Marlborough collection for exhibition at the Metropolitan Museum of Art in the winter of 1886.

== Mihály Munkácsy ==
Though specialized in old masters, Sedelmeyer became friends with the artist Mihály Munkácsy, who lived in Paris from 1872 onwards. Sedelmeyer bought and sold Mihaly Munkácsy's 1878 The Blind Milton Dictating Paradise Lost to his Daughters, and after doing so offered Munkácsy a ten-year contract, making that painter a wealthy man and a really established member of the Paris art world. Sedelmeyer wanted him to paint large-scale pictures which could be exhibited on their own. They decided that a subject taken from the Bible would be most suitable. In 1882 Munkácsy painted Christ before Pilate which was followed by Golgotha in 1884. The trilogy was completed by Ecce Homo in 1896. These huge paintings were taken on a tour and exhibited in many European cities and also in the US. All three were bought by American millionaire John Wanamaker.

== Rembrandt ==
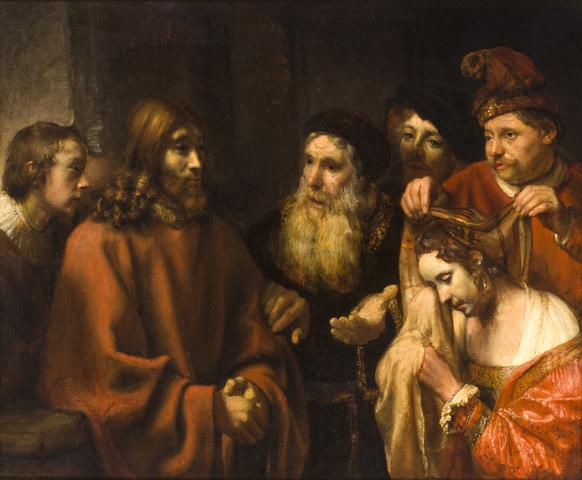
Christ and the Woman taken in Adultery, formerly attributed to Rembrandt and deaccessioned by the Walker Art Center in 2011

A public dispute with Dr. Abraham Bredius over the attribution to Rembrandt of the Woman Taken in Adultery sold by Sedelmeyer to the Weber collection resulted in Sedelmeyer's justificatory pamphlet, 1912. The painting was shown in New York City at the Metropolitan Museum of Art and the attribution was confirmed by Wilhelm Valentiner. The Rembrandt attribution was again confirmed by Hofstede de Groot in 1914, who noted that it was purchased from Sedelmeyer by T. B. Walker. The painting was deaccessioned by the Walker Art Center in 2011.

== Frans Hals ==
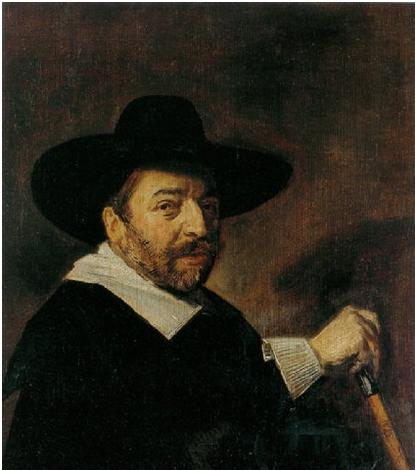
Portrait of a man, attributed to Hals by Hofstede de Groot (cat. 302) and Seymour Slive (cat. 151), found in 1999 to be "of a much later date"

A small Hals sketch of a man from his "wet on wet" traveller series is dated 1643 and surprised Hals expert Seymour Slive for having a date, as most of these small portrait sketches were lacking them. He noticed that it had been in the possession of Sedelmeyer and Munkácsy and remarked that though Hals was very popular among the late 19th-century artists, this was the only painting that had been actually owned by one, as far as he knew. He speculated that he would not be surprised if it came to pass that copies by Munkácsy were discovered of Dutch 17th-century realists, since he seemed to acquire so much inspiration from them. Slive also noted that Sedelmeyer sold "dozens of paintings rightly and wrongly attributed to Hals".

== Personal life ==
He had five daughters. Emilie married the sculptor and art historian Stanislas Lami and Hermina married the Czech painter Václav Brožík. Sedelmeyer's collection was dispersed at a series of sales in Paris.

== Works ==
- Catalogue of the celebrated Collection of Paintings, by Modern and Old Masters, and of Water-Colours and Drawings, formed by M. E. Secretan, sold at Sedelmeyer's Galleries, Paris, July, 1889
- Charles Sedelmeyer, Illustrated Catalogue of 100 Paintings by Old Masters of the Dutch, Flemish, Italian, French and English Schools, Paris 1894
- Charles Sedelmeyer, Illustrated Catalogue of the second Series of 100 Paintings by Old Masters of the Dutch, Flemish, Italian, French and English Schools, Paris 1895
- Charles Sedelmeyer, Illustrated Catalogue of the third Series of 100 Paintings by Old Masters of the Dutch, Flemish, Italian, French and English Schools, Paris 1896
- Charles Sedelmeyer, Illustrated Catalogue of the fourth Series of 100 Paintings by Old Masters of the Dutch, Flemish, Italian, French and English Schools, Paris 1897
- Charles Sedelmeyer, Illustrated catalogue of 300 paintings by old masters of the Dutch, Flemish, Italian, French, and English schools, being some of the principal pictures which have at various times formed part of the Sedelmeyer Gallery, 1898
- Charles Sedelmeyer, Illustrated Catalogue of the fifth Series of 100 Paintings by Old Masters of the Dutch, Flemish, Italian, French and English Schools, Paris 1899
- Charles Sedelmeyer, Illustrated Catalogue of the sixth Series of 100 Paintings by Old Masters of the Dutch, Flemish, Italian, French and English Schools, Paris 1900
- Charles Sedelmeyer, Illustrated Catalogue of the seventh Series of 100 Paintings by Old Masters of the Dutch, Flemish, Italian, French and English Schools, Paris 1901
- Charles Sedelmeyer, Illustrated Catalogue of the eighth Series of 100 Paintings by Old Masters of the Dutch, Flemish, Italian, French and English Schools, Paris 1902
- Charles Sedelmeyer, Illustrated Catalogue of the ninth Series of 100 Paintings by Old Masters of the Dutch, Flemish, Italian, French and English Schools, Paris 1905
- Charles Sedelmeyer, Illustrated Catalogue of the tenth Series of 100 Paintings by Old Masters of the Dutch, Flemish, Italian, French and English Schools, Paris 1906
- Charles Sedelmeyer, Illustrated Catalogue of the eleventh Series of 100 Paintings by Old Masters of the Dutch, Flemish, Italian, French and English Schools, Paris 1911
- Charles Sedelmeyer, Illustrated Catalogue of the twelfth Series of 100 Paintings by Old Masters of the Dutch, Flemish, Italian, French and English Schools, Paris 1913

== Sources ==
- B. Wild, ‘Charles Sedelmeyer: Ein österreichischer Kunsthändler macht Karriere in Paris’, Parnass 14, no. 3 (1994), pp. 76–80 (cited here)
- C. Huemer, 'Charles Sedelmeyer (1837–1925): Kunst und Spekulation am Kunstmarkt in Paris', Belvedere: Zeitschrift für bildende Kunst 2 (Fall 1999), pp. 4–19.
- C. Huemer, 'Charles Sedelmeyer's Theatricality: Art and Speculation in Late 19th-Century Paris', Ján Bakoš (ed.) Artwork through the Market: The Past and the Present, Bratislava: Slowakische Academy of Sciences 2004, pp. 109–124.
- M. Theinhardtová, ‘Charles Sedelmeyer a Václav Brozík, cesky malír historie v Parízi’ (Charles Sedelmeyer and Václav Brozík; a Czech painter of history in Paris), in Václav Brozík (1851–1901), Národní galerie v Praze. Valdstejnská jízdárna (Prague, 2003), pp. 111–29.
- C. Huemer, 'Crossing Thresholds: The Hybrid Identity of Late Nineteenth-Century Art Dealers', Jaynie Anderson (ed.) Crossing Cultures: Conflict-Migration-Convergence, Melbourne: Miegunyah Press 2009, pp. 1007–1011.
