= Saulx, Haute-Saône =

Saulx
- Commune
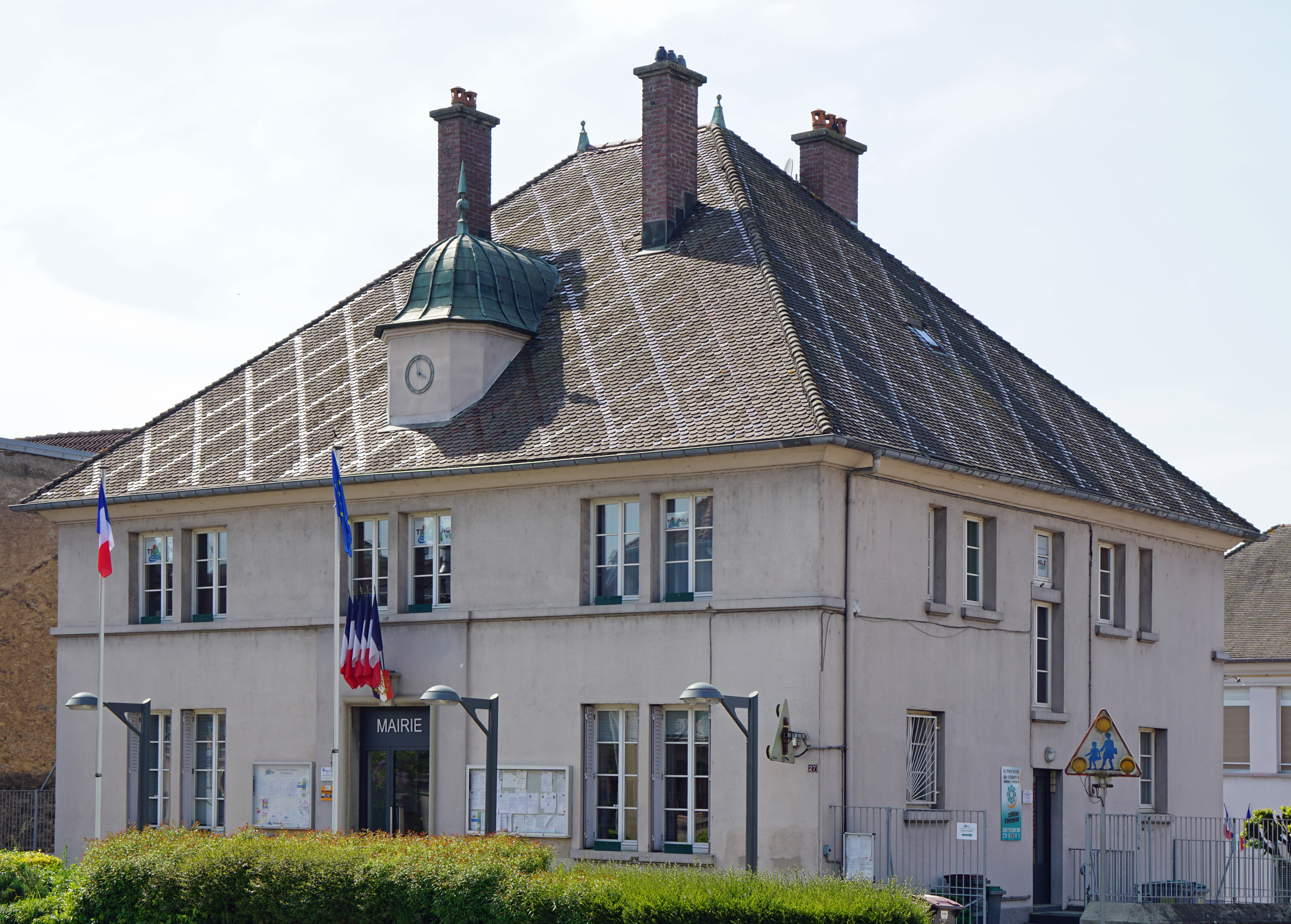
- The town hall in Saulx

- Coat of arms
- Location of Saulx
- Location within France Location within Bourgogne-Franche-Comté
- Coordinates: 47°41′46″N 6°16′47″E
- Country: France
- Region: Bourgogne-Franche-Comté
- Department: Haute-Saône
- Arrondissement: Lure
- Canton: Lure-1

Government
  - Mayor (2020–2026): Benjamin Gonzales
- Area^{1}: 15.12 km^{2} (5.84 sq mi)
- Highest elevation: 375 m (1,230 ft)
- Lowest elevation: 232 m (761 ft)
- Population (2023): 874
  - Density: 57.8/km^{2} (150/sq mi)
- Time zone: UTC+01:00 (CET)
  - Summer (DST): UTC+02:00 (CEST)
- INSEE/Postal code: 70478 /70240
- ^{1} French Land Register data, which excludes lakes, ponds, glaciers > 1 km^{2} (0.386 sq mi or 247 acres) and river estuaries.

Saulx (French pronunciation: [so]) is a commune in the Haute-Saône department in the region of Bourgogne-Franche-Comté in eastern France.

== See also ==
- Communes of the Haute-Saône department
