= Visual Artists Rights Act =

United States federal law granting certain rights to artists

The Visual Artists Rights Act of 1990 (VARA; Pub. L. 101–650 title VI, 17 U.S.C. § 106A), is a United States law granting certain rights to artists.

VARA was the first federal copyright legislation to grant protection to moral rights. Under VARA, works of art that meet certain requirements afford their authors additional rights in the works, regardless of any subsequent physical ownership of the work itself, or regardless of who holds the copyright to the work. For instance, a painter may insist on proper attribution of their painting, and in some instances may sue the owner of the physical painting for destroying the painting even if the owner of the painting lawfully owned it.

Although federal law had not acknowledged moral rights before this act, some state legislatures and judicial decisions created limited protection for moral rights. The Berne Convention required the protection of these rights by signatory states, and it was in response that Congress passed VARA.

== Exclusive rights under VARA ==
VARA exclusively grants authors of works that fall under the protection of the Act the following rights:

- right to claim authorship
- right to prevent the use of one's name on any work the author did not create
- right to prevent use of one's name on any work that has been distorted, mutilated, or modified in a way that would be prejudicial to the author's honor or reputation
- right to prevent distortion, mutilation, or modification that would prejudice the author's honor or reputation

Additionally, authors of works of "recognized stature" may prohibit intentional or grossly negligent destruction of a work. Exceptions to VARA require a waiver from the author in writing. To date, "recognized stature" has managed to elude a precise definition. VARA allows authors to waive their rights, something generally not permitted in France and many European countries whose laws were the originators of the moral rights of artists concept.

In most instances, the rights granted under VARA persist for the life of the author (or the last surviving author, for creators of joint works).

=== Covered works ===
VARA provides its protection only to paintings, drawings, prints, sculptures, still photographic images produced for exhibition only, and existing in single copies or in limited editions of 200 or fewer copies, signed and numbered by the artist. The requirements for protection do not implicate aesthetic taste or value.

== Application and effect ==
VARA's application is limited to visual works that fall within a narrowly defined category. However, for works that do fall within the category of protected works, VARA imposes substantial restrictions on any modification or removal of those works. Purchasers of the works must obtain written waivers from the author if they wish to exercise any of the exclusive rights under VARA.

This has particularly been an issue for those that commission public sculptures. Absent a waiver, artists could effectively veto decisions to remove their structures from their benefactor's land. In a 2006 decision involving public sculptures that were removed from the park for which they were created, the Court of Appeals for the First Circuit ruled that VARA does not protect location as a component of site-specific work. VARA covered works can be moved as long as the move does not constitute "destruction, distortion, or mutilation." However, one artist has claimed "The moment that the sculpture is removed, it will be destroyed, because it cannot be what it is anywhere else."

== Examples of works ==
- Tilted Arc, a well-known artwork by Richard Serra, was removed from public display prior to the enactment of VARA.
- Kent Twitchell's Ed Ruscha mural was painted over without his approval. Twitchell agreed to the largest settlement ever under VARA for $1.1 million against the U.S. government and 12 defendants.
- On February 12, 2018, a federal judge cited VARA in awarding $6.7 million to 21 graffiti artists at the 5 Pointz open-air graffiti museum whose works were destroyed by the developer who owned the property on which the graffiti had been painted. The building owner tore the building down to rebuild condos.
- In 2018, Finnish/American artist Christian Narkiewicz-Laine filed the largest VARA lawsuit in U.S. history stemming from the destruction of the artist's rented space in Galena, Illinois where he alleged over 4,000 works of art were destroyed and mutilated, claiming a value of $11.8 million. During the VARA trial in Rockford, Illinois, the artist's "recognized stature" under the statute was at issue. The defendants argued that he lacked sufficient stature to gain protection, citing his background as a communist, a member of the SDS during the 1970s, his numerous arrests during the Civil Rights Movement, and burning of an American flag during an anti-Vietnam War protest. His art and writings were also attacked for being provocative and “anti-American,” and therefore not of stature. His credibility as a witness was also questioned, based on his prior felony conviction for lying to the FBI during an art fraud investigation. Although the defendants were found liable for trespass, conversion, and negligence, the jury awarded the artist $120,000 for only four undisclosed, unnamed works of art from over 4,000. The federal judge found that the jury's VARA award was properly included within the jury's other damages, thus reducing the amount of the total judgment. In 2019, the case was appealed to the Court of Appeals for the Seventh Circuit and was affirmed. The artist appealed the VARA case to the Supreme Court and was declined a hearing.

== See also ==
- Carter v. Helmsley-Spear Inc.
