= Copyright Directive (disambiguation) =

The copyright directive may refer to, in reverse chronological order, any of the following European Union directives:

- Copyright in the Digital Single Market (2019)
- Copyright Term Directive (2006)
- Enforcement Directive (2004)
- Re-use of public sector information directive (2003)
- Counterfeit goods regulation (2003)
- Resale Rights Directive (2001)
- Information Society Directive (2001)
- Electronic Commerce Directive 2000 (2000)
- Conditional Access Directive (1998)
- Database Directive (1996)
- Copyright Duration Directive (1993)
- Satellite and Cable Directive (1993)
- Rental Directive (1992)
- Computer Programs Directive (1991)

Note that the Copyright in the Digital Single Market directive "updates but does not replace the 11 directives which together comprise the EU’s copyright legislation."

== See also ==
- Copyright law of the European Union
- European Union Directives
- The U.S. Digital Millennium Copyright Act from 1998
