= EU copyright case law =

This is a list of the case law of the Court of Justice of the European Union (CJEU) within the field of copyright and related rights.

PR = Request for a preliminary ruling (under Article 267 of the Treaty on the Functioning of the European Union)

FF = Action for failure to fulfil an obligation

DA = Direct action

Date of delivery	Reference	Type of case	Wording of conclusion
1971-06-08	Case 78/70 (Deutsche Grammophon)	PR	1. It is in conflict with the provisions prescribing the free movement of products within the common market for a manufacturer of sound recordings to exercise the exclusive right to distribute the protected articles, conferred upon him by the legislation of a member state, in such a way as to prohibit the sale in that state of products placed on the market by him or with his consent in another Member State solely because such distribution did not occur within the territory of the first Member State.; 2. (a) a manufacturer of sound recordings who holds an exclusive right of distribution under national legislation does not occupy a dominant position within the meaning of article 86 of the Treaty merely by exercising that right. The position is different when having regard to the circumstances of the case he has the power to impede the maintenance of effective competition over a considerable part of the relevant market. (b) the difference between the controlled price and the price of the product reimported from another Member State does not necessarily suffice to disclose an abuse of a dominant position; it may, however, if unjustified by any objective criteria and if it is particularly market, be a determining factor in such abuse.
1980-03-18	Case 62/79 (Coditel I)	PR	The provisions of the Treaty relating to the freedom to provide services do not preclude an assignee of the performing right in a cinematographic film in a Member State from relying upon his right to prohibit the exhibition of that film in that state, without his authority, by means of cable diffusion if the film so exhibited is picked up and transmitted after being broadcast in another Member State by a third party with the consent of the original owner of the right.
1981-01-20	Case 55+57/80 (Musik-Vertrieb Membran)	PR	Articles 30 and 36 of the Treaty must be interpreted as precluding the application of national legislation under which a copyright management society empowered to exercise the copyrights of composers of musical works reproduced on gramophone records or other sound recordings in another member state is permitted to invoke those rights where those sound recordings are distributed on the national market after having been put into circulation in that other Member State by or with the consent of the owners of those copyrights, to claim the payment of a fee equal to the royalties ordinarily paid for marketing on the national market less the lower royalties paid in the Member State of manufacture.
1981-01-22	Case 58/80 (Dansk Supermarked v. Imerco)	PR	1. Articles 30 and 36 of the EEC Treaty must be interpreted to mean that the judicial authorities of a Member State may not prohibit, on the basis of a copyright or of a trademark, the marketing on the territory of that State of a product to which one of those rights applies if that product has been lawfully marketed on the territory of another Member State by the proprietor of such rights or with his consent.; 2. Article 30 of the EEC Treaty must be interpreted as meaning: That the importation into a Member State of goods lawfully marketed in another Member State cannot as such be classified as an improper or unfair commercial practice, without prejudice however to the possible application of legislation of the State of importation against such practices on the ground of the circumstances or methods of offering such goods for sale as distinct from the fact of importation; and That an agreement between individuals intended to prohibit the importation of such goods may not be relied upon or taken into consideration to classify the marketing of such goods as an improper or unfair commercial practice.
1982-10-06	Case 262/81 (Coditel II)	PR	A contract whereby the owner of the copyright for a film grants an exclusive right to exhibit that film for a specific period in the territory of a Member State is not, as such, subject to the prohibitions contained in Article 85 of the Treaty. It is, however, where appropriate, for the national court to ascertain whether, in a given case, the manner in which the exclusive right conferred by that contract is exercised is subject to a situation in the economic or legal sphere the object or effect of which is to prevent or restrict the distribution of films or to distort competition on the cinematographic market, regard being had to the specific characteristics of that market.
1988-05-17	Case 158/86 (Warner Brothers)	PR	Articles 30 and 36 of the EEC Treaty do not prohibit the application of national legislation which gives an author the right to make the hiring-out of video-cassettes subject to his permission, when the video-cassettes in question have already been put into circulation with his consent in another Member State whose legislation enables the author to control the initial sale, without giving him the right to prohibit hiring-out.
1989-01-24	Case C-341/87 (Patricia)	PR	Articles 30 and 36 of the EEC Treaty must be interpreted as not precluding the application of a Member State's legislation which allows a producer of sound recordings in that Member State to rely on the exclusive rights to reproduce and distribute certain musical works of which he is the owner to prohibit the sale, in the territory of that Member State, of sound recordings of the same musical works when those recordings are imported from another Member State in which they were lawfully marketed without the consent of the aforesaid owner or his licensee and in which the producer of those recordings had enjoyed protection which has in the meantime expired.
1989-07-13	Case 395/87 (Tournier)	PR	(1) Articles 30 and 59 of the Treaty must be interpreted as not preventing the application of national legislation which treats as an infringement of copyright the public performance of a protected musical work by means of sound recordings without payment of royalties, where royalties have already been paid to the author, for the reproduction of the work, in another Member State. (2) Article 85 of the EEC Treaty must be interpreted as prohibiting any concerted practice by national copyright-management societies of the Member States having as its object or effect the refusal by each society to grant direct access to its repertoire to users established in another Member State. It is for the national courts to determine whether any concerted action by such management societies has in fact taken place. (3) The refusal by a national society for the management of copyright in musical works to grant the users of recorded music access only to the foreign repertoire represented by it does not have the object or effect of restricting competition in the common market unless access to a part of the protected repertoire could entirely safeguard the interests of the authors, composers and publishers of music without thereby increasing the costs of managing contracts and monitoring the use of protected musical works. (4) Article 86 of the Treaty must be interpreted as meaning that a national copyright-management society holding a dominant position in a substantial part of the Common Market imposes unfair trading conditions where the royalties which it charges to discothèques are appreciably higher than those charged in other Member States, the rates being compared on a consistent basis. That would not be the case if the copyright-management society in question were able to justify such a difference by reference to objective and relevant dissimilarities between copyright management in the Member State concerned and copyright management in the other Member States.
1993-10-20	Case C-92+326/92 (Phil Collins)	PR	1. Copyright and related rights fall within the scope of application of the Treaty, within the meaning of the first paragraph of Article7; the general principle of non-discrimination laid down by that article is, therefore, applicable to them.; 2. The first paragraph of Article7 of the Treaty must be interpreted as precluding the legislation of a Member State from denying to authors and per-formers from other Member States, and those claiming under them, the right, accorded by that legislation to the nationals of that State, to prohibit the marketing in its national territory of a phonogram manufactured without their consent, where the performance was given outside its national territory.; 3. The first paragraph of Article 7 of the Treaty must be interpreted as meaning that the principle of non-discrimination which it lays down may be directly relied upon before a national court by an author or performer from another Member State, or by those claiming under them, to claim the benefits of protection reserved to national authors and performers.
1995-04-06	Case C-241+242/91 (Magill)	DA	(Appeals dismissed)
1997-11-04	Case C-337/95 (Dior v. Evora)	PR	1. Where a question relating to the interpretation of the First Council Directive (89/104/EEC) of 21 December 1988 to approximate the laws of the Member States relating to trade marks is raised in proceedings in one of the Benelux Member States concerning the interpretation of the Uniform Benelux Law on Trade Marks, a court against whose decisions there is no remedy under national law, as is the case with both the Benelux Court and the Hoge Raad der Nederlanden, must make a reference to the Court of Justice under the third paragraph of Article 177 of the EC Treaty. However, that obligation loses its purpose and is thus emptied of its substance when the question raised is substantially the same as a question which has already been the subject of a preliminary ruling in the same national proceedings.; 2. On a proper interpretation of Articles 5 and 7 of Directive 89/104, when trade-marked goods have been put on the Community market by the proprietor of the trade mark or with his consent, a reseller, besides being free to resell those goods, is also free to make use of the trade mark to bring to the public's attention the further commercialisation of those goods.; 3. The proprietor of a trade mark may not rely on Article 7(2) of Directive 89/104 to oppose the use of the trade mark, by a reseller who habitually markets articles of the same kind, but not necessarily of the same quality, as the trade-marked goods, in ways customary in the reseller's sector of trade, for the purpose of bringing to the public's attention the further commercialisation of those goods, unless it is established that, given the specific circumstances of the case, the use of the trade mark for this purpose seriously damages the reputation of the trade mark.; 4. On a proper interpretation of Articles 30 and 36 of the EC Treaty, the proprietor of a trade mark or holder of copyright may not oppose their use by a reseller who habitually markets articles of the same kind, but not necessarily of the same quality, as the protected goods, in ways customary in the reseller's sector of trade, for the purpose of bringing to the public's attention the further commercialisation of those goods, unless it is established that, having regard to the specific circumstances of the case, the use of those goods for that purpose seriously damages their reputation.
1998-04-28	Case C-200/96 (Metronome Musik)	PR	Examination of the question submitted has disclosed no factor of such a kind as to affect the validity of Article 1(1) of Council Directive 92/100/EEC of 19 November 1992 on rental right and lending right and on certain rights related to copyright in the field of intellectual property.
1998-09-22	Case C-61/97 (Laserdisken I)	PR	It is not contrary to Articles 30 and 36 of the EC Treaty or to Council Directive 92/100/EEC of 19 November 1992 on rental right and lending right and on certain rights related to copyright in the field of intellectual property for the holder of an exclusive rental right to prohibit copies of a film from being offered for rental in a Member State even where the offering of those copies for rental has been authorised in the territory of another Member State.
1999-06-29	Case C-60/98 (Butterfly Music)	PR	Article 10(3) of Council Directive 93/98/EEC of 29 October 1993 harmonising the term of protection of copyright and certain related rights does not preclude a provision of national law such as the provision which, in Italian Law No 52 of6 February 1996, as amended by Italian Law No 650 of 23 December 1996, lays down a limited period in which sound-recording media may be distributed by persons who, by reason of the expiry of the rights relating to those media under the previous legislation, had been able to reproduce and market them before that Law entered into force.
1999-10-12	Case C-213/98 (Commission v. Ireland)	FF	[B]y failing to adopt within the prescribed period the laws, regulations and administrative provisions necessary to comply with Council Directive 92/100/EEC of 19 November 1992 on rental right and lending right and on certain rights related to copyright in the field of intellectual property, Ireland has failed to fulfil its obligations under that directive.
1999-11-25	Case C-212/98 (Commission v. Ireland)	FF	[B]y failing to adopt within the prescribed period the laws, regulations and administrative provisions necessary to comply with Council Directive 93/83/EEC of 27 September 1993 on the co-ordination of certain rules concerning copyright and rights related to copyright applicable to satellite broadcasting and cable retransmission, Ireland has failed to fulfil its obligations under that directive.
2000-02-03	Case C-293/98 (Egeda v. Hoasa)	PR	The question whether the reception by a hotel establishment of satellite or terrestrial television signals and their distribution by cable to the various rooms of that hotel is an 'act of communication to the public' or 'reception by the public' is not governed by Council Directive 93/83/EEC of 27 September 1993 on the co-ordination of certain rules concerning copyright and rights related to copyright applicable to satellite broadcasting and cable retransmission, and must consequently be decided in accordance with national law.
2000-04-13	Case C-348/99 (Commission v. Luxembourg)	FF	[B]y failing to adopt the laws, regulations and administrative provisions necessary to comply with Directive 96/9/EC of the European Parliament and of the Council of 11 March 1996 on the legal protection of databases, the Grand Duchy of Luxembourg has failed to fulfil its obligations thereunder.
2003-02-06	Case C-245/00 (SENA v. NOS)	PR	1. The concept of equitable remuneration in Article 8(2) of Council Directive 92/100/EEC of 19 November 1992 on rental right and lending right and on certain rights related to copyright in the field of intellectual property must be interpreted uniformly in all the Member States and applied by each Member State; it is for each Member State to determine, in its own territory, the most appropriate criteria for assuring, within the limits imposed by Community law and Directive 92/100 in particular, adherence to that Community concept.; 2. Article 8(2) of Directive 92/100 does not preclude a model for calculating what constitutes equitable remuneration for performing artists and phonogram producers that operates by reference to variable and fixed factors, such as the number of hours of phonograms broadcast, the viewing and listening densities achieved by the radio and television broadcasters represented by the broadcast organisation, the tariffs fixed by agreement in the field of performance rights and broadcast rights in respect of musical works protected by copyright, the tariffs set by the public broadcast organisations in the Member States bordering on the Member State concerned, and the amounts paid by commercial stations, provided that that model is such as to enable a proper balance to be achieved between the interests of performing artists and producers in obtaining remuneration for the broadcast of a particular phonogram, and the interests of third parties in being able to broadcast the phonogram on terms that are reasonable, and that it does not contravene any principle of Community law.
2003-10-16	Case C-433/02 (Commission v. Belgium)	FF	[B]y failing to apply the provisions on the public lending right provided for in Council Directive 92/100/EEC of 19 November 1992 on rental right and lending right and on certain rights related to copyright in the field of intellectual property, the Kingdom of Belgium has failed to fulfil its obligations under Articles 1 and 5 of that directive.
2004-04-29	Case C-418/01 (IMS Health)	PR	1. For the purposes of examining whether the refusal by an undertaking in a dominant position to grant a licence for a brick structure protected by an intellectual property right which it owns is abusive, the degree of participation by users in the development of that structure and the outlay, particularly in terms of cost, on the part of potential users to purchase studies on regional sales of pharmaceutical products presented on the basis of an alternative structure are factors which must be taken into consideration to determine whether the protected structure is indispensable to the marketing of studies of that kind.; 2. The refusal by an undertaking which holds a dominant position and owns an intellectual property right in a brick structure indispensable to the presentation of regional sales data on pharmaceutical products in a Member State to grant a licence to use that structure to another undertaking which also wishes to provide such data in the same Member State, constitutes an abuse of a dominant position within the meaning of Article 82 EC where the following conditions are fulfilled: – the undertaking which requested the licence intends to offer, on the market for the supply of the data in question, new products or services not offered by the owner of the intellectual property right and for which there is a potential consumer demand; – the refusal is not justified by objective considerations; – the refusal is such as to reserve to the owner of the intellectual property right the market for the supply of data on sales of pharmaceutical products in the Member State concerned by eliminating all competition on that market.
2004-11-09	Case C-46/02 (Fixtures v. Oy Veikkaus)	PR	The expression 'investment in ... the obtaining ... of the contents' of a database in Article 7(1) of Directive 96/9/EC of the European Parliament and of the Council of 11 March 1996 on the legal protection of databases must be understood to refer to the resources used to seek out existing independent materials and collect them in the database. It does not cover the resources used for the creation of materials which make up the contents of a database. In the context of drawing up a fixture list for the purpose of organising football league fixtures, therefore, it does not cover the resources used to establish the dates, times and the team pairings for the various matches in the league.
2004-11-09	Case C-338/02 (Fixtures v. Svenska Spel)	PR	The expression 'investment in ... the obtaining ... of the contents' of a database in Article 7(1) of Directive 96/9/EC of the European Parliament and of the Council of 11 March 1996 on the legal protection of databases must be understood to refer to the resources used to seek out existing independent materials and collect them in the database. It does not cover the resources used for the creation of materials which make up the contents of a database. In the context of drawing up a fixture list for the purpose of organising football league fixtures, therefore, it does not cover the resources used to establish the dates, times and the team pairings for the various matches in the league.
2004-11-09	Case C-444/02 (Fixtures v. OPAP)	PR	The term 'database' as defined in Article 1(2) of Directive 96/9/EC of the European Parliament and of the Council of 11 March 1996 on the legal protection of databases refers to any collection of works, data or other materials, separable from one another without the value of their contents being affected, including a method or system of some sort for the retrieval of each of its constituent materials. A fixture list for a football league such as that at issue in the case in the main proceedings constitutes a database within the meaning of Article 1(2) of Directive 96/9. The expression 'investment in ... the obtaining ... of the contents' of a database in Article 7(1) of Directive 96/9 must be understood to refer to the resources used to seek out existing independent materials and collect them in the database. It does not cover the resources used for the creation of materials which make up the contents of a database. In the context of drawing up a fixture list for the purpose of organising football league fixtures, therefore, it does not cover the resources used to establish the dates, times and the team pairings for the various matches in the league.
2004-11-09	Case C-203/02 (British Horseracing)	PR	1. The expression 'investment in ... the obtaining ... of the contents' of a database in Article 7(1) of Directive 96/9/EC of the European Parliament and of the Council of 11 March 1996 on the legal protection of databases must be understood to refer to the resources used to seek out existing independent materials and collect them in the database. It does not cover the resources used for the creation of materials which make up the contents of a database.; The expression 'investment in ... the ... verification ... of the contents' of a database in Article 7(1) of Directive 96/9 must be understood to refer to the resources used, with a view to ensuring the reliability of the information contained in that database, to monitor the accuracy of the materials collected when the database was created and during its operation. The resources used for verification during the stage of creation of materials which are subsequently collected in a database do not fall within that definition. The resources used to draw up a list of horses in a race and to carry out checks in that connection do not constitute investment in the obtaining and verification of the contents of the database in which that list appears.: 2. The terms 'extraction' and 're-utilisation' as defined in Article 7 of Directive 96/9 must be interpreted as referring to any unauthorised act of appropriation and distribution to the public of the whole or a part of the contents of a database. Those terms do not imply direct access to the database concerned.; The fact that the contents of a database were made accessible to the public by its maker or with his consent does not affect the right of the maker to prevent acts of extraction and/or re-utilisation of the whole or a substantial part of the contents of a database.: 3. The expression 'substantial part, evaluated ... quantitatively, of the contents of [a] database' in Article 7 of Directive 96/9 refers to the volume of data extracted from the database and/or re-used and must be assessed in relation to the total volume of the contents of the database.; The expression 'substantial part, evaluated qualitatively ... of the contents of [a] database' refers to the scale of the investment in the obtaining, verification or presentation of the contents of the subject of the act of extraction and/or re-utilisation, regardless of whether that subject represents a quantitatively substantial part of the general contents of the protected database. Any part which does not fulfil the definition of a substantial part, evaluated both quantitatively and qualitatively, falls within the definition of an insubstantial part of the contents of a database.: 4. The prohibition laid down by Article 7(5) of Directive 96/9 refers to unauthorised acts of extraction or re-utilisation the cumulative effect of which is to reconstitute and/or make available to the public, without the authorisation of the maker of the database, the whole or a substantial part of the contents of that database and thereby seriously prejudice the investment by the maker.
2005-07-14	Case C-192/04 (Lagardere)	PR	1. In the case of a broadcast of the kind at issue in this case, Council Directive 93/83/EEC of 27 September 1993 on the co-ordination of certain rules concerning copyright and rights related to copyright applicable to satellite broadcasting and cable retransmission does not preclude the fee for phonogram use being governed not only by the law of the Member State in whose territory the broadcasting company is established but also by the legislation of the Member State in which, for technical reasons, the terrestrial transmitter broadcasting to the first State is located.; 2. Article 8(2) of Council Directive 92/100/EEC of 19 November 1992 on rental right and lending right and on certain rights related to copyright in the field of intellectual property must be interpreted as meaning that, for determination of the equitable remuneration mentioned in that provision, the broadcasting company is not entitled unilaterally to deduct from the amount of the royalty for phonogram use payable in the Member State in which it is established the amount of the royalty paid or claimed in the Member State in whose territory the terrestrial transmitter broadcasting to the first State is located.
2006-04-27	Case C-180/05 (Commission v. Luxembourg)	FF	(Unofficial translation: By not applying the provisions on public lending right provided for in Directive 92/100 / EEC of 19 November 1992 on rental right and lending right and on certain rights related to copyright in the field of intellectual property, the Grand Duchy of Luxembourg has failed to fulfil its obligations under Articles 1 and 5 of that directive.)
2006-06-01	Case C-169/05 (Uradex)	PR	Article 9(2) of Council Directive 93/83/EEC of 27 September 1993 on the co-ordination of certain rules concerning copyright and rights related to copyright applicable to satellite broadcasting and cable retransmission is to be interpreted as meaning that, where a collecting society is deemed to be mandated to manage the rights of a copyright owner or holder of related rights who has not transferred the management of his rights to a collecting society, that society has the power to exercise that rightholder's right to grant or refuse authorisation to a cable operator for cable retransmission and, consequently, its mandate is not limited to management of the pecuniary aspects of those rights.
2006-07-06	Case C-53/05 (Commission v. Portugal)	FF	[B]y exempting all categories of public lending establishments from the obligation to pay remuneration to authors for public lending, the Portuguese Republic has failed to fulfil its obligations under Articles 1 and 5 of Council Directive 92/100/EEC of 19 November 1992 on rental right and lending right and on certain rights related to copyright in the field of intellectual property.
2006-07-13	Case C-61/05 (Commission v. Portugal)	FF	[B]y creating in national law a rental right also in favour of producers of videograms, the Portuguese Republic has failed to fulfil its obligations under Article 2(1) of Council Directive 92/100/EEC of 19 November 1992 on rental right and lending right and on certain rights related to copyright in the field of intellectual property, as last amended by Directive 2001/29/EC of the European Parliament and of the Council of 22 May 2001 on the harmonisation of certain aspects of copyright and related rights in the information society. [B]y creating in national legislation some doubt as to who is responsible for paying the remuneration owed to performers on assignment of the rental right, the Portuguese Republic has failed to comply with Article 4 of Directive 92/100, as amended by Directive 2001/29, in conjunction with Article 2(5) and (7) thereof.
2006-09-12	Case C-479/04 (Laserdisken II)	PR	1. Consideration of the first question does not reveal any information such as to affect the validity of Article 4(2) of Directive 2001/29/EC of the European Parliament and of the Council of 22 May 2001 on the harmonisation of certain aspects of copyright and related rights in the information society.; 2. Article 4(2) of Directive 2001/29 is to be interpreted as precluding national rules providing for exhaustion of the distribution right in respect of the original or copies of a work placed on the market outside the European Community by the rightholder or with his consent.
2006-10-26	Case C-198/05 (Commission v. Italy)	FF	(Unofficial translation: By exempting all categories of public lending establishments from the public lending right within the meaning of Council Directive 92/100/EEC of 19 November 1992 on rental right and lending right and on certain rights related to copyright in the field of intellectual property, the Italian Republic has failed to fulfil its obligations under Articles 1 and 5 of that directive).
2006-10-26	Case C-36/05 (Commission v. Spain)	FF	[B]y exempting almost all, if not all, categories of establishments undertaking the public lending of works protected by copyright from the obligation to pay remuneration to authors for the lending carried out, the Kingdom of Spain has failed to fulfil its obligations under Articles 1 and 5 of Council Directive 92/100/EEC of 19 November 1992 on rental right and lending right and on certain rights related to copyright in the field of intellectual property.
2006-12-07	Case C-306/05 (Rafael Hoteles)	PR	1. While the mere provision of physical facilities does not as such amount to communication within the meaning of Directive 2001/29/EC of the European Parliament and of the Council of 22 May 2001 on the harmonisation of copyright and related rights in the information society, the distribution of a signal by means of television sets by a hotel to customers staying in its rooms, whatever technique is used to transmit the signal, constitutes communication to the public within the meaning of Article 3(1) of that directive.; 2. The private nature of hotel rooms does not preclude the communication of a work by means of television sets from constituting communication to the public within the meaning of Article 3(1) of Directive 2001/29.
2007-01-11	Case C-175/05 (Commission v. Ireland)	FF	[B]y exempting all categories of public lending establishments, within the meaning of Council Directive 92/100/EEC of 19 November 1992 on rental right and lending right and on certain rights related to copyright in the field of intellectual property, from the obligation to remunerate authors for the lending carried out by them, Ireland has failed to fulfil its obligations under Articles 1 and 5 of that directive.
2007-01-31	Case C-32/07 (Commission v. Spain)	FF	(Unofficial translation: By failing to adopt within the prescribed period the laws, regulations and administrative provisions necessary to comply with Directive 2001/84/EC of the European Parliament and of the Council of 27 September 2001 on the resale right for the benefit of the author of an original work of art, the Kingdom of Spain has failed to fulfil its obligations under that directive).
2008-01-29	Case C-275/06 (Promusicae)	PR	Directive 2000/31/EC of the European Parliament and of the Council of 8 June 2000 on certain legal aspects of information society services, in particular electronic commerce, in the Internal Market ('Directive on electronic commerce'), Directive 2001/29/EC of the European Parliament and of the Council of 22 May 2001 on the harmonisation of certain aspects of copyright and related rights in the information society, Directive 2004/48/EC of the European Parliament and of the Council of 29 April 2004 on the enforcement of intellectual property rights, and Directive 2002/58/EC of the European Parliament and of the Council of 12 July 2002 concerning the processing of personal data and the protection of privacy in the electronic communications sector (Directive on privacy and electronic communications) do not require the Member States to lay down, in a situation such as that in the main proceedings, an obligation to communicate personal data to ensure effective protection of copyright in the context of civil proceedings. However, Community law requires that, when transposing those directives, the Member States take care to rely on an interpretation of them which allows a fair balance to be struck between the various fundamental rights protected by the Community legal order. Further, when implementing the measures transposing those directives, the authorities and courts of the Member States must not only interpret their national law in a manner consistent with those directives but also make sure that they do not rely on an interpretation of them which would be in conflict with those fundamental rights or with the other general principles of Community law, such as the principle of proportionality.
2008-02-21	Case C-328/07 (Commission v. Luxembourg)	FF	(Unofficial translation: By failing to adopt, within the prescribed period the laws, regulations and administrative provisions necessary to comply with Directive 2004/48/EC of the European Parliament and of the Council of 29 April 2004 on the enforcement of intellectual property rights, the Grand Duchy of Luxembourg has failed to fulfil its obligations under that directive).
2008-04-17	Case C-456/06 (Peek & Cloppenburg)	PR	The concept of distribution to the public, otherwise than through sale, of the original of a work or a copy thereof, for the purpose of Article 4(1) of Directive 2001/29/EC of the European Parliament and of the Council of 22 May 2001 on the harmonisation of certain aspects of copyright and related rights in the information society, applies only where there is a transfer of the ownership of that object. As a result, neither granting to the public the right to use reproductions of a work protected by copyright nor exhibiting to the public those reproductions without actually granting a right to use them can constitute such a form of distribution.
2008-05-15	Case C-341/07 (Commission v. Sweden)	FF	(Unofficial translation: By failing to adopt, within the prescribed period the laws, regulations and administrative provisions necessary to comply with Directive 2004/48/EC of the European Parliament and of the Council of 29 April 2004 on the enforcement of intellectual property rights, the Kingdom of Sweden has failed to fulfil its obligations under that directive).
2008-06-05	Case C-395/07 (Commission v. Germany)	FF	(Unofficial translation: By failing to adopt, within the prescribed period the laws, regulations and administrative provisions necessary to comply with Directive 2004/48/EC of the European Parliament and of the Council of 29 April 2004 on the enforcement of intellectual property rights, the Federal Republic of Germany has failed to fulfil its obligations under that directive).
2008-09-09	Case C-24/08 (Commission v. Portugal)	FF	(Action discontinued and case before the CJEU terminated).
2008-10-09	Case C-304/07 (Directmedia)	PR	The transfer of material from a protected database to another database following an on‑screen consultation of the first database and an individual assessment of the material contained in that first database is capable of constituting an 'extraction', within the meaning of Article 7 of Directive 96/9 of the European Parliament and of the Council of 11 March 1996 on the legal protection of databases, to the extent that – which it is for the referring court to ascertain – that operation amounts to the transfer of a substantial part, evaluated qualitatively or quantitatively, of the contents of the protected database, or to transfers of insubstantial parts which, by their repeated or systematic nature, would have resulted in the reconstruction of a substantial part of those contents.
2009-01-20	Case C-240/07 (Sony v. Falcon)	PR	1. The term of protection laid down by Directive 2006/116/EC of the European Parliament and of the Council of 12 December 2006 on the term of protection of copyright and certain related rights is also applicable, pursuant to Article 10(2) thereof, where the subject-matter at issue has at no time been protected in the Member State in which the protection is sought.; 2. Article 10(2) of Directive 2006/116 is to be interpreted as meaning that the terms of protection provided for by that directive apply in a situation where the work or subject-matter at issue was, on 1 July 1995, protected as such in at least one Member State under that Member State's national legislation on copyright and related rights and where the holder of such rights in respect of that work or subject-matter, who is a national of a non-Member State, benefited, at that date, from the protection provided for by those national provisions.
2009-01-21	Case C-98/08 (Canal Satellite Digital)	PR	(National case settled and case before the CJEU terminated).
2009-02-19	Case C-557/07 (LSG v. Tele2)	PR	1. Community law – in particular, Article 8(3) of Directive 2004/48/EC of the European Parliament and of the Council of 29 April 2004 on the enforcement of intellectual property rights, read in conjunction with Article 15(1) of Directive 2002/58/EC of the European Parliament and of the Council of 12 July 2002 concerning the processing of personal data and the protection of privacy in the electronic communications sector (Directive on privacy and electronic communications) – does not preclude Member States from imposing an obligation to disclose to private third parties personal data relating to Internet traffic to enable them to bring civil proceedings for copyright infringements. Community law nevertheless requires Member States to ensure that, when transposing into national law Directive 2000/31/EC of the European Parliament and of the Council of 8 June 2000 on certain legal aspects of information society services, in particular electronic commerce, in the Internal Market ('Directive on electronic commerce'), Directive 2001/29/EC of the European Parliament and of the Council of 22 May 2001 on the harmonisation of certain aspects of copyright and related rights in the information society, and Directives 2002/58 and 2004/48, they rely on an interpretation of those directives which allows a fair balance to be struck between the various fundamental rights involved. Moreover, when applying the measures transposing those directives, the authorities and courts of Member States must not only interpret their national law in a manner consistent with those directives but must also make sure that they do not rely on an interpretation of those directives which would conflict with those fundamental rights or with the other general principles of Community law, such as the principle of proportionality.; 2. Access providers which merely provide users with Internet access, without offering other services such as email, FTP or file‑sharing services or exercising any control, whether de iure or de facto, over the services which users make use of, must be regarded as 'intermediaries' within the meaning of Article 8(3) of Directive 2001/29.
2009-03-05	Case C-545/07 (Apis-Hristovich EOOD v. Lakorda)	PR	1. The delimitation of the concepts of 'permanent transfer' and 'temporary transfer' in Article 7 of Directive 96/9/EC of the European Parliament and of the Council of 11 March 1996 on the legal protection of databases is based on the criterion of the length of time during which materials extracted from a protected database are stored in a medium other than that database. The time at which there is an extraction, within the meaning of Article 7, from a protected database, accessible electronically, is when the materials which are the subject of the act of transfer are stored in a medium other than that database. The concept of extraction is independent of the objective pursued by the perpetrator of the act at issue, of any modifications he may make to the contents of the materials thus transferred, and of any differences in the structural organisation of the databases concerned.; The fact that the physical and technical characteristics present in the contents of a protected database made by a particular person also appear in the contents of a database made by another person may be interpreted as evidence of extraction within the meaning of Article 7 of Directive 96/9, unless that coincidence can be explained by factors other than a transfer between the two databases concerned. The fact that materials obtained by the maker of a database from sources not accessible to the public also appear in a database made by another person is not sufficient, in itself, to prove the existence of such extraction but can constitute circumstantial evidence thereof. The nature of the computer program used to manage two electronic databases is not a factor in assessing the existence of extraction within the meaning of Article 7 of Directive 96/9.: 2. Article 7 of Directive 96/9 must be interpreted as meaning that, where there is a body of materials composed of separate modules, the volume of the materials allegedly extracted and/or re-used from one of those modules must, to assess whether there has been extraction and/or re-utilisation of a substantial part, evaluated quantitatively, of the contents of a database within the meaning of that article, be compared with the total contents of that module, if the latter constitutes, in itself, a database which fulfils the conditions for protection by the sui generis right. Otherwise, and in so far as the body of materials constitutes a database protected by that right, the comparison must be made between the volume of the materials allegedly extracted and/or re-used from the various modules of that database and its total contents.; The fact that the materials allegedly extracted and/or re‑used from a database protected by the sui generis right were obtained by the maker of that database from sources not accessible to the public may, according to the amount of human, technical and/or financial resources deployed by the maker to collect the materials at issue from those sources, affect the classification of those materials as a substantial part, evaluated qualitatively, of the contents of the database concerned, within the meaning of Article 7 of Directive 96/9. The fact that part of the materials contained in a database are official and accessible to the public does not relieve the national court of an obligation, in assessing whether there has been extraction and/or re‑utilisation of a substantial part of the contents of that database, to verify whether the materials allegedly extracted and/or re-used from that database constitute a substantial part, evaluated quantitatively, of its contents or, as the case may be, whether they constitute a substantial part, evaluated qualitatively, of the database inasmuch as they represent, in terms of the obtaining, verification and presentation thereof, a substantial human, technical or financial investment.
2009-07-16	Case C-5/08 (Infopaq I)	PR	1. An act occurring during a data capture process, which consists of storing an extract of a protected work comprising 11 words and printing out that extract, is such as to come within the concept of reproduction in part within the meaning of Article 2 of Directive 2001/29/EC of the European Parliament and of the Council of 22 May 2001 on the harmonisation of certain aspects of copyright and related rights in the information society, if the elements thus reproduced are the expression of the intellectual creation of their author; it is for the national court to make this determination.; 2. The act of printing out an extract of 11 words, during a data capture process such as that at issue in the main proceedings, does not fulfil the condition of being transient in nature as required by Article 5(1) of Directive 2001/29 and, therefore, that process cannot be carried out without the consent of the relevant rightholders.
2010-03-18	Case C-136/09 (Organismos Sillogikis v. Divaniakropous)	PR	The hotelier, by installing televisions in his hotel rooms and by connecting them to the central antenna of the hotel, thereby, and without more, carries out an act of communication to the public within the meaning of Article 3(1) of Directive 2001/29/EC of the European Parliament and of the Council of 22 May 2001 on the harmonisation of certain aspects of copyright and related rights in the information society.
2010-04-15	Case C-518/08 (Salvador Dalí)	PR	Article 6(1) of Directive 2001/84/EC of the European Parliament and of the Council of 27 September 2001 on the resale right for the benefit of the author of an original work of art must be interpreted as not precluding a provision of national law, such as the provision at issue in the main proceedings, which reserves the benefit of the resale right to the artist's heirs at law alone, to the exclusion of testamentary legatees. That being so, it is for the referring court, for the purposes of applying the national provision transposing Article 6(1) of Directive 2001/84, to take due account of all the relevant rules for the resolution of conflicts of laws relating to the transfer on succession of the resale right.
2010-10-21	Case C-467/08 (Padawan)	PR	1. The concept of 'fair compensation', within the meaning of Article 5(2)(b) of Directive 2001/29/EC of the European Parliament and of the Council of 22 May 2001 on the harmonisation of certain aspects of copyright and related rights in the information society, is an autonomous concept of European Union law which must be interpreted uniformly in all the Member States that have introduced a private copying exception, irrespective of the power conferred on the Member States to determine, within the limits imposed by European Union law in particular by that directive, the form, detailed arrangements for financing and collection, and the level of that fair compensation.; 2. Article 5(2)(b) of Directive 2001/29 must be interpreted as meaning that the 'fair balance' between the persons concerned means that fair compensation must be calculated on the basis of the criterion of the harm caused to authors of protected works by the introduction of the private copying exception. It is consistent with the requirements of that 'fair balance' to provide that persons who have digital reproduction equipment, devices and media and who on that basis, in law or in fact, make that equipment available to private users or provide them with copying services are the persons liable to finance the fair compensation, inasmuch as they are able to pass on to private users the actual burden of financing it.; 3. Article 5(2)(b) of Directive 2001/29 must be interpreted as meaning that a link is necessary between the application of the levy intended to finance fair compensation with respect to digital reproduction equipment, devices and media and the deemed use of them for the purposes of private copying. Consequently, the indiscriminate application of the private copying levy, in particular with respect to digital reproduction equipment, devices and media not made available to private users and clearly reserved for uses other than private copying, is incompatible with Directive 2001/29.
2010-11-30	Case C-387/09 (Magnatrading)	PR	(Reference withdrawn due to the judgment in case C-467/08 (Padawan)).
2010-12-22	Case C-393/09 (BSA)	PR	1. A graphic user interface is not a form of expression of a computer program within the meaning of Article 1(2) of Council Directive 91/250/EEC of 14 May 1991 on the legal protection of computer programs and cannot be protected by copyright as a computer program under that directive. Nevertheless, such an interface can be protected by copyright as a work by Directive 2001/29/EC of the European Parliament and of the Council of 22 May 2001 on the harmonisation of certain aspects of copyright and related rights in the information society if that interface is its author's own intellectual creation.; 2. Television broadcasting of a graphic user interface does not constitute communication to the public of a work protected by copyright within the meaning of Article 3(1) of Directive 2001/29.
2011-01-27	Case C-168/09 (Flos)	PR	1. Article 17 of Directive 98/71/EC of the European Parliament and of the Council of 13 October 1998 on the legal protection of designs must be interpreted as precluding legislation of a Member State which excludes from copyright protection in that Member State designs which were protected by a design right registered in or in respect of a Member State and which entered the public domain before the date of entry into force of that legislation, although they meet all the requirements to be eligible for copyright protection.; 2. Article 17 of Directive 98/71 must be interpreted as precluding legislation of a Member State which – either for a substantial period of 10 years or completely – excludes from copyright protection designs which, although they meet all the requirements to be eligible for copyright protection, entered the public domain before the date of entry into force of that legislation, that being the case with regard to any third party who has manufactured or marketed products based on such designs in that State – irrespective of the date on which those acts were performed.
2011-06-16	Case C-462/09 (Opus Supplies)	PR	1. Directive 2001/29/EC of the European Parliament and of the Council of 22 May 2001 on the harmonisation of certain aspects of copyright and related rights in the information society, in particular Article 5(2)(b) and (5) thereof, must be interpreted as meaning that the final user who carries out, on a private basis, the reproduction of a protected work must, in principle, be regarded as the person responsible for paying the fair compensation provided for in Article 5(2)(b). However, it is open to the Member States to establish a private copying levy chargeable to the persons who make reproduction equipment, devices and media available to that final user, since they are able to pass on the amount of that levy in the price paid by the final user for that service.; 2. Directive 2001/29, in particular Article 5(2)(b) and (5) thereof, must be interpreted as meaning that it is for the Member State which has introduced a system of private copying levies chargeable to the manufacturer or importer of media for reproduction of protected works, and on the territory of which the harm caused to authors by the use for private purposes of their work by purchasers who reside there occurs, to ensure that those authors actually receive the fair compensation intended to compensate them for that harm. In that regard, the mere fact that the commercial seller of reproduction equipment, devices and media is established in a Member State other than that in which the purchasers reside has no bearing on that obligation to achieve a certain result. It is for the national court, where it is impossible to ensure recovery of the fair compensation from the purchasers, to interpret national law to allow recovery of that compensation from the person responsible for payment who is acting on a commercial basis.
2011-06-30	Case C-271/10 (VEWA)	PR	Article 5(1) of Council Directive 92/100/EEC of 19 November 1992 on rental right and lending right and on certain rights related to copyright in the field of intellectual property precludes legislation, such as that at issue in the main proceedings, which establishes a system under which the remuneration payable to authors in the event of public lending is calculated exclusively according to the number of borrowers registered with public establishments, on the basis of a flat-rate amount fixed per borrower and per year.
2011-10-04	Case C-403+429/08 (Premier League)	PR	1. 'Illicit device' within the meaning of Article 2(e) of Directive 98/84/EC of the European Parliament and of the Council of 20 November 1998 on the legal protection of services based on, or consisting of, conditional access must be interpreted as not covering foreign decoding devices (devices which give access to the satellite broadcasting services of a broadcaster, are manufactured and marketed with that broadcaster's authorisation, but are used, in disregard of its will, outside the geographical area for which they have been issued), foreign decoding devices procured or enabled by the provision of a false name and address or foreign decoding devices which have been used in breach of a contractual limitation permitting their use only for private purposes.; 2. Article 3(2) of Directive 98/84 does not preclude national legislation which prevents the use of foreign decoding devices, including those procured or enabled by the provision of a false name and address or those used in breach of a contractual limitation permitting their use only for private purposes, since such legislation does not fall within the field coordinated by that directive.; 3. On a proper construction of Article 56 TFEU: – that article precludes legislation of a Member State which makes it unlawful to import into and sell and use in that State foreign decoding devices which give access to an encrypted satellite broadcasting service from another Member State that includes subject-matter protected by the legislation of that first State; – this conclusion is affected neither by the fact that the foreign decoding device has been procured or enabled by the giving of a false identity and a false address, with the intention of circumventing the territorial restriction in question, nor by the fact that it is used for commercial purposes although it was restricted to private use.: 4. The clauses of an exclusive licence agreement concluded between a holder of intellectual property rights and a broadcaster constitute a restriction on competition prohibited by Article 101 TFEU where they oblige the broadcaster not to supply decoding devices enabling access to that right holder's protected subject-matter with a view to their use outside the territory covered by that licence agreement.; 5. Article 2(a) of Directive 2001/29/EC of the European Parliament and of the Council of 22 May 2001 on the harmonisation of certain aspects of copyright and related rights in the information society must be interpreted as meaning that the reproduction right extends to transient fragments of the works within the memory of a satellite decoder and on a television screen, provided that those fragments contain elements which are the expression of the authors' own intellectual creation, and the unit composed of the fragments reproduced simultaneously must be examined to determine whether it contains such elements.; 6. Acts of reproduction such as those at issue in Case C-403/08, which are performed within the memory of a satellite decoder and on a television screen, fulfil the conditions laid down in Article 5(1) of Directive 2001/29 and may therefore be carried out without the authorisation of the copyright holders concerned.; 7. 'Communication to the public' within the meaning of Article 3(1) of Directive 2001/29 must be interpreted as covering transmission of the broadcast works, via a television screen and speakers, to the customers present in a public house.; 8. Council Directive 93/83/EEC of 27 September 1993 on the co-ordination of certain rules concerning copyright and rights related to copyright applicable to satellite broadcasting and cable retransmission must be interpreted as not having a bearing on the lawfulness of the acts of reproduction performed within the memory of a satellite decoder and on a television screen.
2011-10-13	Case C-431+432/09 (Airfield)	PR	Article 2 of Council Directive 93/83/EEC of 27 September 1993 on the co-ordination of certain rules concerning copyright and rights related to copyright applicable to satellite broadcasting and cable retransmission must be interpreted as requiring a satellite package provider to obtain authorisation from the right holders concerned for its intervention in the direct or indirect transmission of television programmes, such as the transmission at issue in the main proceedings, unless the right holders have agreed with the broadcasting organisation concerned that the protected works will also be communicated to the public through that provider, on condition, in the latter situation, that the provider's intervention does not make those works accessible to a new public.
2011-11-24	Case C-70/10 (Scarlet Extended)	PR	Directives: – 2000/31/EC of the European Parliament and of the Council of 8 June 2000 on certain legal aspects of information society services, in particular electronic commerce, in the Internal Market ('Directive on electronic commerce'); – 2001/29/EC of the European Parliament and of the Council of 22 May 2001 on the harmonisation of certain aspects of copyright and related rights in the information society; – 2004/48/EC of the European Parliament and of the Council of 29 April 2004 on the enforcement of intellectual property rights; – 95/46/EC of the European Parliament and of the Council of 24 October 1995 on the protection of individuals with regard to the processing of personal data and on the free movement of such data; and – 2002/58/EC of the European Parliament and of the Council of 12 July 2002 concerning the processing of personal data and the protection of privacy in the electronic communications sector (Directive on privacy and electronic communications), read together and construed in the light of the requirements stemming from the protection of the applicable fundamental rights, must be interpreted as precluding an injunction made against an internet service provider which requires it to install a system for filtering – all electronic communications passing via its services, in particular those involving the use of peer-to-peer software; – which applies indiscriminately to all its customers; – as a preventive measure; – exclusively at its expense; and – for an unlimited period, which is capable of identifying on that provider's network the movement of electronic files containing a musical, cinematographic or audio-visual work in respect of which the applicant claims to hold intellectual-property rights, with a view to blocking the transfer of files the sharing of which infringes copyright.
2011-11-24	Case C-283/10 (Circ & Variete Globus București)	PR	Directive 2001/29/EC of the European Parliament and of the Council of 22 May 2001 on the harmonisation of certain aspects of copyright and related rights in the information society and, more specifically, Article 3(1) thereof, must be interpreted as referring only to communication to a public which is not present at the place where the communication originates, to the exclusion of any communication of a work which is carried out directly in a place open to the public using any means of public performance or direct presentation of the work.
2011-12-01	Case C-145/10 (Painer)	PR	1. Article 6(1) of Council Regulation (EC) No 44/2001 of 22 December 2000 on jurisdiction and the recognition and enforcement of judgments in civil and commercial matters must be interpreted as not precluding its application solely because actions against several defendants for substantially identical copyright infringements are brought on national legal grounds which vary according to the Member States concerned. It is for the referring court to assess, in the light of all the elements of the case, whether there is a risk of irreconcilable judgments if those actions were determined separately.; 2. Article 6 of Council Directive 93/98/EEC of 29 October 1993 harmonising the term of protection of copyright and certain related rights must be interpreted as meaning that a portrait photograph can, under that provision, be protected by copyright if, which it is for the national court to determine in each case, such photograph is an intellectual creation of the author reflecting his personality and expressing his free and creative choices in the production of that photograph. Since it has been determined that the portrait photograph in question is a work, its protection is not inferior to that enjoyed by any other work, including other photographic works.; 3. Article 5(3)(e) of Directive 2001/29/EC of the European Parliament and of the Council of 22 May 2001 on the harmonisation of certain aspects of copyright and related rights in the information society, read in the light of Article 5(5) of that directive, must be interpreted as meaning that the media, such as newspaper publishers, may not use, of their own volition, a work protected by copyright by invoking an objective of public security. However, it is conceivable that a newspaper publisher might, in specific cases, contribute to the fulfilment of such an objective by publishing a photograph of a person for whom a search has been launched. It should be required that such initiative is taken, first, within the framework of a decision or action taken by the competent national authorities to ensure public security and, second, by agreement and in co-ordination with those authorities, to avoid the risk of interfering with the measures taken by them, without, however, a specific, current and express appeal, on the part of the security authorities, for publication of a photograph for the purposes of an investigation being necessary.; 4. Article 5(3)(d) of Directive 2001/29, read in the light of Article 5(5) of that directive, must be interpreted as not precluding its application where a press report quoting a work or other protected subject-matter is not a literary work protected by copyright.; 5. Article 5(3)(d) of Directive 2001/29, read in the light of Article 5(5) of that directive, must be interpreted as meaning that its application is subject to the obligation to indicate the source, including the name of the author or performer, of the work or other protected subject-matter quoted. However, if, in applying Article 5(3)(e) of Directive 2001/29, that name was not indicated, that obligation must be regarded as having been fulfilled if the source alone is indicated.
2012-01-17	Case C-302/10 (Infopaq II)	PR	(1) Article 5(1) of Directive 2001/29/EC of the European Parliament and of the Council of 22 May 2001 on the harmonisation of certain aspects of copyright and related rights in the information society must be interpreted as meaning that the acts of temporary reproduction carried out during a 'data capture' process, such as those in issue in the main proceedings, – fulfil the condition that those acts must constitute an integral and essential part of a technological process, notwithstanding the fact that they initiate and terminate that process and involve human intervention; – fulfil the condition that those acts of reproduction must pursue a sole purpose, namely to enable the lawful use of a protected work or a protected subject-matter; – fulfil the condition that those acts must not have an independent economic significance provided, first, that the implementation of those acts does not enable the generation of an additional profit going beyond that derived from the lawful use of the protected work and, secondly, that the acts of temporary reproduction do not lead to a modification of that work. 2) Article 5(5) of Directive 2001/29 must be interpreted as meaning that, if they fulfil all the conditions laid down in Article 5(1) of that directive, the acts of temporary reproduction carried out during a 'data capture' process, such as those in issue in the main proceedings, must be regarded as fulfilling the condition that the acts of reproduction may not conflict with a normal exploitation of the work or unreasonably prejudice the legitimate interests of the rightholder.
2012-02-09	Case C-277/10 (Luksan)	PR	1. Articles 1 and 2 of Council Directive 93/83/EEC of 27 September 1993 on the co-ordination of certain rules concerning copyright and rights related to copyright applicable to satellite broadcasting and cable retransmission, and Articles 2 and 3 of Directive 2001/29/EC of the European Parliament and of the Council of 22 May 2001 on the harmonisation of certain aspects of copyright and related rights in the information society in conjunction with Articles 2 and 3 of Directive 2006/115/EC of the European Parliament and of the Council of 12 December 2006 on rental right and lending right and on certain rights related to copyright in the field of intellectual property and with Article 2 of Directive 2006/116/EC of the European Parliament and of the Council of 12 December 2006 on the term of protection of copyright and certain related rights, must be interpreted as meaning that rights to exploit a cinematographic work such as those at issue in the main proceedings (reproduction right, satellite broadcasting right and any other right of communication to the public through the making available to the public) vest by operation of law, directly and originally, in the principal director. Consequently, those provisions must be interpreted as precluding national legislation which allocates those exploitation rights by operation of law exclusively to the producer of the work in question.; 2. European Union law must be interpreted as allowing the Member States the option of laying down a presumption of transfer, in favour of the producer of a cinematographic work, of rights to exploit the cinematographic work such as those at issue in the main proceedings (satellite broadcasting right, reproduction right and any other right of communication to the public through the making available to the public), provided that such a presumption is not an irrebuttable one precluding the principal director of that work from agreeing otherwise.; 3. European Union law must be interpreted as meaning that, in his capacity as author of a cinematographic work, the principal director thereof must be entitled, by operation of law, directly and originally, to the right to the fair compensation provided for in Article 5(2)(b) of Directive 2001/29 under the 'private copying' exception.; 4. European Union law must be interpreted as not allowing the Member States the option of laying down a presumption of transfer, in favour of the producer of a cinematographic work, of the right to fair compensation vesting in the principal director of that work, whether that presumption is couched in irrebuttable terms or may be departed from.
2012-02-16	Case C-360/10 (SABAM v. Netlog)	PR	Directives: – 2000/31/EC of the European Parliament and of the Council of 8 June 2000 on certain legal aspects of information society services, in particular electronic commerce, in the Internal Market (Directive on electronic commerce); – 2001/29/EC of the European Parliament and of the Council of 22 May 2001 on the harmonisation of certain aspects of copyright and related rights in the information society; and – 2004/48/EC of the European Parliament and of the Council of 29 April 2004 on the enforcement of intellectual property rights, read together and construed in the light of the requirements stemming from the protection of the applicable fundamental rights, must be interpreted as precluding a national court from issuing an injunction against a hosting service provider which requires it to install a system for filtering: – information which is stored on its servers by its service users; – which applies indiscriminately to all of those users; – as a preventative measure; – exclusively at its expense; and – for an unlimited period, which is capable of identifying electronic files containing musical, cinematographic or audio-visual work in respect of which the applicant for the injunction claims to hold intellectual property rights, with a view to preventing those works from being made available to the public in breach of copyright.
2012-02-26	Case C-510/10 (DR & TV2 v. NCB)	PR	1. The expression 'by means of their own facilities' in Article 5(2)(d) of Directive 2001/29/EC of the European Parliament and of the Council of 22 May 2001 on the harmonisation of certain aspects of copyright and related rights in the information society must be given an independent and uniform interpretation within the framework of European Union law.; 2. Article 5(2)(d) of Directive 2001/29, read in the light of recital 41 in the preamble to that directive, must be interpreted as meaning that a broadcasting organisation's own facilities include the facilities of any third party acting on behalf of or under the responsibility of that organisation.; 3. For the purposes of ascertaining whether a recording made by a broadcasting organisation, for its own broadcasts, with the facilities of a third party, is covered by the exception laid down in Article 5(2)(d) of Directive 2001/29 in respect of ephemeral recordings, it is for the national court to assess whether, in the circumstances of the dispute in the main proceedings, that party may be regarded as acting specifically 'on behalf of' the broadcasting organisation or, at the very least, 'under the responsibility' of that organisation. As regards whether that party may be regarded as acting 'under the responsibility' of the broadcasting organisation, it is essential that, vis-à-vis other persons, among others the authors who may be harmed by an unlawful recording of their works, the broadcasting organisation is required to pay compensation for any adverse effects of the acts and omissions of the third party, such as a legally independent external television production company, connected with the recording in question, as if the broadcasting organisation had itself carried out those acts and made those omissions.
2012-03-01	Case C-406/10 (Football Dataco I)	PR	1. Article 1(2) of Council Directive 91/250/EEC of 14 May 1991 on the legal protection of computer programs must be interpreted as meaning that neither the functionality of a computer program nor the programming language and the format of data files used in a computer program to exploit certain of its functions constitute a form of expression of that program and, as such, are not protected by copyright in computer programs for the purposes of that directive.; 2. Article 5(3) of Directive 91/250 must be interpreted as meaning that a person who has obtained a copy of a computer program under a licence is entitled, without the authorisation of the owner of the copyright, to observe, study or test the functioning of that program so as to determine the ideas and principles which underlie any element of the program, in the case where that person carries out acts covered by that licence and acts of loading and running necessary for the use of the computer program, and on condition that that person does not infringe the exclusive rights of the owner of the copyright in that program.; 3. Article 2(a) of Directive 2001/29/EC of the European Parliament and of the Council of 22 May 2001 on the harmonisation of certain aspects of copyright and related rights in the information society must be interpreted as meaning that the reproduction, in a computer program or a user manual for that program, of certain elements described in the user manual for another computer program protected by copyright is capable of constituting an infringement of the copyright in the latter manual if – this being a matter for the national court to ascertain – that reproduction constitutes the expression of the intellectual creation of the author of the user manual for the computer program protected by copyright.
2012-03-15	Case C-135/10 (Marco Del Corso)	PR	1. The provisions of the Agreement on Trade-Related Aspects of Intellectual Property Rights, which constitutes Annex 1C to the Agreement establishing the World Trade Organisation (WTO) signed at Marrakesh on 15 April 1994 and approved by Council Decision 94/800/EC of 22 December 1994 concerning the conclusion on behalf of the European Community, as regards matters within its competence, of the agreements reached in the Uruguay Round multilateral negotiations (1986–1994) and of the World Intellectual Property Organisation (WIPO) Performances and Phonograms Treaty of 20 December 1996 are applicable in the legal order of the European Union.; As the International Convention for the Protection of Performers, Producers of Phonograms and Broadcasting Organisations, adopted at Rome on 26 October 1961, does not form part of the legal order of the European Union it is not applicable there; however, it has indirect effects within the European Union. Individuals may not rely directly either on that convention or on the agreement or the treaty mentioned above. The concept of 'communication to the public' which appears in Council Directive 92/100/EEC of 19 November 1992 on rental right and lending right and on certain rights related to copyright in the field of intellectual property and Directive 2001/29/EC of the European Parliament and of the Council of 22 May 2001 on the harmonisation of certain aspects of copyright and related rights in the information society must be interpreted in the light of the equivalent concepts contained in the convention, the agreement and the treaty mentioned above and in such a way that it is compatible with those agreements, taking account of the context in which those concepts are found and the purpose of the relevant provisions of the agreements as regards intellectual property.: 2. The concept of 'communication to the public' for the purposes of Article 8(2) of Directive 92/100 must be interpreted as meaning that it does not cover the broadcasting, free of charge, of phonograms within private dental practices engaged in professional economic activity, such as the one at issue in the main proceedings, for the benefit of patients of those practices and enjoyed by them without any active choice on their part. Therefore, such an act of transmission does not entitle the phonogram producers to the payment of remuneration.
2012-03-15	Case C-162/10 (Phonographic Performance v. Ireland)	PR	1. A hotel operator which provides in guest bedrooms televisions and/or radios to which it distributes a broadcast signal is a 'user' making a 'communication to the public' of a phonogram which may be played in a broadcast for the purposes of Article 8(2) of Directive 2006/115/EC of the European Parliament and of the Council of 12 December 2006 on rental right and lending right and on certain rights related to copyright in the field of intellectual property.; 2. A hotel operator which provides in guest bedrooms televisions and/or radios to which it distributes a broadcast signal is obliged to pay equitable remuneration under Article 8(2) of Directive 2006/115 for the broadcast of a phonogram, in addition to that paid by the broadcaster.; 3. A hotel operator which provides in guest bedrooms, not televisions and/or radios to which it distributes a broadcast signal, but other apparatus and phonograms in physical or digital form which may be played on or heard from such apparatus, is a 'user' making a 'communication to the public' of a phonogram within the meaning of Article 8(2) of Directive 2006/115/EC. It is therefore obliged to pay 'equitable remuneration' under that provision for the transmission of those phonograms.; 4. Article 10(1)(a) of Directive 2006/115, which provides for a limitation to the right to equitable remuneration provided for by Article 8(2) of that directive in the case of 'private use', does not allow Member States to exempt a hotel operator which makes a 'communication to the public' of a phonogram, within the meaning of Article 8(2) of that directive, from the obligation to pay such remuneration.
2012-04-19	Case C-461/10 (Bonnier)	PR	Directive 2006/24/EC of the European Parliament and of the Council of 15 March 2006 on the retention of data generated or processed in connection with the provision of publicly available electronic communications services or of public communications networks and amending Directive 2002/58/EC must be interpreted as not precluding the application of national legislation based on Article 8 of Directive 2004/48/EC of the European Parliament and of the Council of 29 April 2004 on the enforcement of intellectual property rights which, to identify an internet subscriber or user, permits an internet service provider in civil proceedings to be ordered to give a copyright holder or its representative information on the subscriber to whom the internet service provider provided an IP address which was allegedly used in an infringement, since that legislation does not fall within the material scope of Directive 2006/24. It is irrelevant to the main proceedings that the Member State concerned has not yet transposed Directive 2006/24, despite the period for doing so having expired. Directives 2002/58/EC of the European Parliament and of the Council of 12 July 2002 concerning the processing of personal data and the protection of privacy in the electronic communications sector (Directive on privacy and electronic communications) and 2004/48 must be interpreted as not precluding national legislation such as that at issue in the main proceedings insofar as that legislation enables the national court seised of an application for an order for disclosure of personal data, made by a person who is entitled to act, to weigh the conflicting interests involved, on the basis of the facts of each case and taking due account of the requirements of the principle of proportionality.
2012-05-02	Case C-406/10 (SAS Institute v. World Programming)	PR	1. Article 1(2) of Council Directive 91/250/EEC of 14 May 1991 on the legal protection of computer programs must be interpreted as meaning that neither the functionality of a computer program nor the programming language and the format of data files used in a computer program to exploit certain of its functions constitute a form of expression of that program and, as such, are not protected by copyright in computer programs for the purposes of that directive.; 2. Article 5(3) of Directive 91/250 must be interpreted as meaning that a person who has obtained a copy of a computer program under a licence is entitled, without the authorisation of the owner of the copyright, to observe, study or test the functioning of that program so as to determine the ideas and principles which underlie any element of the program, in the case where that person carries out acts covered by that licence and acts of loading and running necessary for the use of the computer program, and on condition that that person does not infringe the exclusive rights of the owner of the copyright in that program.; 3. Article 2(a) of Directive 2001/29/EC of the European Parliament and of the Council of 22 May 2001 on the harmonisation of certain aspects of copyright and related rights in the information society must be interpreted as meaning that the reproduction, in a computer program or a user manual for that program, of certain elements described in the user manual for another computer program protected by copyright is capable of constituting an infringement of the copyright in the latter manual if – this being a matter for the national court to ascertain – that reproduction constitutes the expression of the intellectual creation of the author of the user manual for the computer program protected by copyright.
2012-06-21	Case C-5/11 (Donner)	PR	A trader who directs his advertising at members of the public residing in a given Member State and creates or makes available to them a specific delivery system and payment method, or allows a third party to do so, thereby enabling those members of the public to receive delivery of copies of works protected by copyright in that same Member State, makes, in the Member State where the delivery takes place, a 'distribution to the public' under Article 4(1) of Directive 2001/29/EC of the European Parliament and of the Council of 22 May 2001 on the harmonisation of certain aspects of copyright and related rights in the information society. Articles 34 TFEU and 36 TFEU must be interpreted as meaning that they do not preclude a Member State from bringing a prosecution under national criminal law for the offence of aiding and abetting the prohibited distribution of copies of copyright-protected works where copies of such works are distributed to the public on the territory of that Member State in the context of a sale, aimed specifically at the public of that State, concluded in another Member State where those works are not protected by copyright or the protection conferred on them is not enforceable as against third parties.
2012-07-03	Case C-128/11 (UsedSoft)	PR	1. Article 4(2) of Directive 2009/24/EC of the European Parliament and of the Council of 23 April 2009 on the legal protection of computer programs must be interpreted as meaning that the right of distribution of a copy of a computer program is exhausted if the copyright holder who has authorised, even free of charge, the downloading of that copy from the internet onto a data carrier has also conferred, in return for payment of a fee intended to enable him to obtain a remuneration corresponding to the economic value of the copy of the work of which he is the proprietor, a right to use that copy for an unlimited period.; 2. Articles 4(2) and 5(1) of Directive 2009/24 must be interpreted as meaning that, in the event of the resale of a user licence entailing the resale of a copy of a computer program downloaded from the copyright holder's website, that licence having originally been granted by that rightholder to the first acquirer for an unlimited period in return for payment of a fee intended to enable the rightholder to obtain a remuneration corresponding to the economic value of that copy of his work, the second acquirer of the licence, as well as any subsequent acquirer of it, will be able to rely on the exhaustion of the distribution right under Article 4(2) of that directive, and hence be regarded as lawful acquirers of a copy of a computer program within the meaning of Article 5(1) of that directive and benefit from the right of reproduction provided for in that provision.
2012-07-12	Case C-138/11 (Compass-Datenbank)	PR	The activity of a public authority consisting in the storing, in a database, of data which undertakings are obliged to report on the basis of statutory obligations, in permitting interested persons to search for that data and/or in providing them with print-outs thereof does not constitute an economic activity, and that public authority is not, therefore, to be regarded, in the course of that activity, as an undertaking, within the meaning of Article 102 TFEU. The fact that those searches and/or that provision of print-outs are carried out in consideration for remuneration provided for by law and not determined, directly or indirectly, by the entity concerned, is not such as to alter the legal classification of that activity. In addition, when such a public authority prohibits any other use of the data thus collected and made available to the public, by relying upon the sui generis protection granted to it as maker of the database pursuant to Article 7 of Directive 96/9/EC of the European Parliament and of the Council of 11 March 1996 on the legal protection of databases, or upon any other intellectual property right, it also does not exercise an economic activity and is not therefore to be regarded, in the course of that activity, as an undertaking, within the meaning of Article 102 TFEU.
2012-10-18	Case C-173/11 (Football Dataco II)	PR	Article 7 of Directive 96/9/EC of the European Parliament and of the Council of 11 March 1996 on the legal protection of databases must be interpreted as meaning that the sending by one person, by means of a web server located in Member State A, of data previously uploaded by that person from a database protected by the sui generis right under that directive to the computer of another person located in Member State B, at that person's request, for the purpose of storage in that computer's memory and display on its screen, constitutes an act of 're-utilisation' of the data by the person sending it. That act takes place, at least, in Member State B, where there is evidence from which it may be concluded that the act discloses an intention on the part of the person performing the act to target members of the public in Member State B, which is for the national court to assess.
2013-03-07	Case C-607/11 (TV Catch Up)	PR	1. The concept of 'communication to the public', within the meaning of Article 3(1) of Directive 2001/29/EC of the European Parliament and of the Council of 22 May 2001 on the harmonisation of certain aspects of copyright and related rights in the information society, must be interpreted as meaning that it covers a retransmission of the works included in a terrestrial television broadcast; – where the retransmission is made by an organisation other than the original broadcaster, – by means of an internet stream made available to the subscribers of that other organisation who may receive that retransmission by logging on to its server, – even though those subscribers are within the area of reception of that terrestrial television broadcast and may lawfully receive the broadcast on a television receiver.: 2. The answer to Question 1 is not influenced by the fact that a retransmission, such as that at issue in the main proceedings, is funded by advertising and is therefore of a profit-making nature.; 3. The answer to Question 1 is not influenced by the fact that a retransmission, such as that at issue in the main proceedings, is made by an organisation which is acting in direct competition with the original broadcaster.
2013-05-22	Case C-416/12 (Wikom Elektrik v. VG Media)	PR	(Reference withdrawn due to the judgment in case C-607/11 (TV Catch Up)).
2013-06-27	Case C-457-460/11 (VG Wort)	PR	1. With regard to the period from 22 June 2001, the date on which Directive 2001/29/EC of the European Parliament and of the Council of 22 May 2001 on the harmonisation of certain aspects of copyright and related rights in the information society entered into force, to 22 December 2002, the date by which that directive was to have been transposed into national law, acts of using protected works or other subject-matter are not affected by that directive.; 2. In the context of an exception or limitation provided for by Article 5(2) or (3) of Directive 2001/29, an act by which a rightholder may have authorised the reproduction of his protected work or other subject-matter has no bearing on the fair compensation owed, whether it is provided for on a compulsory or an optional basis under the relevant provision of that directive.; 3. The possibility of applying technological measures under Article 6 of Directive 2001/29 cannot render inapplicable the condition relating to fair compensation provided for by Article 5(2)(b) of that directive.; 4. The concept of 'reproductions effected by the use of any kind of photographic technique or by some other process having similar effects' within the meaning of Article 5(2)(a) of Directive 2001/29 must be interpreted as including reproductions effected using a printer and a personal computer, where the two are linked together. In this case, it is open to the Member States to put in place a system in which the fair compensation is paid by the persons in possession of a device contributing, in a non-autonomous manner, to the single process of reproduction of the protected work or other subject-matter on the given medium, in so far as those persons have the possibility of passing on the cost of the levy to their customers, provided that the overall amount of the fair compensation owed as recompense for the harm suffered by the author at the end of that single process must not be substantially different from the amount fixed for a reproduction obtained by means of a single device.
2013-07-11	Case C-521/11 (Amazon v. Austro-Mechana)	PR	1. Article 5(2)(b) of Directive 2001/29/EC of the European Parliament and of the Council of 22 May 2001 on the harmonisation of certain aspects of copyright and related rights in the information society must be interpreted as meaning that it does not preclude legislation of a Member State which indiscriminately applies a private copying levy on the first placing on the market in its territory, for commercial purposes and for consideration, of recording media suitable for reproduction, while at the same time providing for a right to reimbursement of the levies paid in the event that the final use of those media does not meet the criteria set out in that provision, where, having regard to the particular circumstances of each national system and the limits imposed by that directive, which it is for the national court to verify, practical difficulties justify such a system of financing fair compensation and the right to reimbursement is effective and does not make repayment of the levies paid excessively difficult.; 2. Article 5(2)(b) of Directive 2001/29 must be interpreted as meaning that, in the context of a system of financing of fair compensation under that provision by means of a private copying levy to be borne by persons who first place recording media suitable for reproduction on the market in the territory of the Member State concerned for commercial purposes and for consideration, that provision does not preclude the establishment by that Member State of a rebuttable presumption of private use of such media where they are marketed to natural persons, where the practical difficulties of determining whether the purpose of the use of the media in question is private justify the establishment of such a presumption and provided that the presumption established does not result in the imposition of the private copying levy in cases where the final use of those media clearly does not fall within the case referred to in that provision.; 3. Article 5(2)(b) of Directive 2001/29 must be interpreted as meaning that the right to fair compensation under that provision or the private copying levy intended to finance that compensation cannot be excluded by reason of the fact that half of the funds received by way of such compensation or levy is paid, not directly to those entitled to such compensation, but to social and cultural institutions set up for the benefit of those entitled, provided that those social and cultural establishments actually benefit those entitled and the detailed arrangements for the operation of such establishments are not discriminatory, which it is for the national court to verify.; 4. Article 5(2)(b) of Directive 2001/29 must be interpreted as meaning that the obligation undertaken by a Member State to pay, on the placing on the market, for commercial purposes and for consideration, of recording media suitable for reproduction, a private copying levy intended to finance the fair compensation under that provision may not be excluded by reason of the fact that a comparable levy has already been paid in another Member State.
2013-12-19	Case C-202/12 (Innoweb)	PR	Article 7(1) of Directive 96/9/EC of the European Parliament and of the Council of 11 March 1996 on the legal protection of databases must be interpreted as meaning that an operator who makes available on the Internet a dedicated meta search engine such as that at issue in the main proceedings re-uses the whole or a substantial part of the contents of a database protected under Article 7, where that dedicated meta engine: – provides the end user with a search form which essentially offers the same range of functionality as the search form on the database site; – 'translates' queries from end users into the search engine for the database site 'in real time', so that all the information on that database is searched through; and – presents the results to the end user using the format of its website, grouping duplications together into a single block item but in an order that reflects criteria comparable to those used by the search engine of the database site concerned for presenting results.
2014-01-23	Case C-355/12 (Nintendo)	PR	Directive 2001/29/EC of the European Parliament and of the Council of 22 May 2001 on the harmonisation of certain aspects of copyright and related rights in the information society must be interpreted as meaning that the concept of an 'effective technological measure', for the purposes of Article 6(3) of that directive, is capable of covering technological measures comprising, principally, equipping not only the housing system containing the protected work, such as the videogame, with a recognition device to protect it against acts not authorised by the holder of any copyright, but also portable equipment or consoles intended to ensure access to those games and their use. It is for the national court to determine whether other measures or measures which are not installed in consoles could cause less interference with the activities of third parties or limitations to those activities, while still providing comparable protection of the rightholder's rights. Accordingly, it is relevant to take account, inter alia, of the relative costs of different types of technological measures, of technological and practical aspects of their implementation, and of a comparison of the effectiveness of those different types of technological measures as regards the protection of the rightholder's rights, that effectiveness however not having to be absolute. That court must also examine the purpose of devices, products or components, which are capable of circumventing those technological measures. In that regard, the evidence of use which third parties actually make of them will, in the light of the circumstances at issue, be particularly relevant. The national court may, in particular, examine how often those devices, products or components are in fact used in disregard of copyright and how often they are used for purposes which do not infringe copyright.
2014-02-13	Case C-466/12 (Svensson)	PR	1. Article 3(1) of Directive 2001/29/EC of the European Parliament and of the Council of 22 May 2001 on the harmonisation of certain aspects of copyright and related rights in the information society, must be interpreted as meaning that the provision on a website of clickable links to works freely available on another website does not constitute an 'act of communication to the public', as referred to in that provision.; 2. Article 3(1) of Directive 2001/29 must be interpreted as precluding a Member State from giving wider protection to copyright holders by laying down that the concept of communication to the public includes a wider range of activities than those referred to in that provision.
2014-02-27	Case C-351/12 (OSA)	PR	1. Article 3(1) of Directive 2001/29/EC of the European Parliament and of the Council of 22 May 2001 on the harmonisation of certain aspects of copyright and related rights in the information society must be interpreted as precluding national legislation which excludes the right of authors to authorise or prohibit the communication of their works, by a spa establishment which is a business, through the intentional distribution of a signal by means of television or radio sets in the bedrooms of the establishment's patients. Article 5(2)(e), (3)(b) and (5) of that directive is not such as to affect that interpretation.; 2. Article 3(1) of Directive 2001/29 must be interpreted as meaning that it cannot be relied on by a copyright collecting society in a dispute between individuals for the purpose of setting aside national legislation contrary to that provision. However, the national court hearing such a case is required to interpret that legislation, so far as possible, in the light of the wording and purpose of the directive to achieve an outcome consistent with the objective pursued by the directive.; 3. Article 16 of Directive 2006/123/EC of the European Parliament and of the Council of 12 December 2006 on services in the internal market, and Articles 56 TFEU and 102 TFEU must be interpreted as not precluding national legislation, such as that at issue in the main proceedings, which reserves the exercise of collective management of copyright in respect of certain protected works in the territory of the Member State concerned to a single copyright collecting society and thereby prevents users of such works, such as the spa establishment in the main proceedings, from benefiting from the services provided by another collecting society established in another Member State.; However, Article 102 TFEU must be interpreted as meaning that the imposition by that copyright collecting society of fees for its services which are appreciably higher than those charged in other Member States (a comparison of the fee levels having been made on a consistent basis) or the imposition of a price which is excessive in relation to the economic value of the service provided are indicative of an abuse of a dominant position.
2014-03-27	Case C-314/12 (UPC Telekabel)	PR	1. Article 8(3) of Directive 2001/29/EC of the European Parliament and of the Council of 22 May 2001 on the harmonisation of certain aspects of copyright and related rights in the information society must be interpreted as meaning that a person who makes protected subject-matter available to the public on a website without the agreement of the rightholder, for the purpose of Article 3(2) of that directive, is using the services of the internet service provider of the persons accessing that subject-matter, which must be regarded as an intermediary within the meaning of Article 8(3) of Directive 2001/29.; 2. The fundamental rights recognised by EU law must be interpreted as not precluding a court injunction prohibiting an internet service provider from allowing its customers access to a website placing protected subject-matter online without the agreement of the rightholders when that injunction does not specify the measures which that access provider must take and when that access provider can avoid incurring coercive penalties for breach of that injunction by showing that it has taken all reasonable measures, provided that (i) the measures taken do not unnecessarily deprive internet users of the possibility of lawfully accessing the information available and (ii) that those measures have the effect of preventing unauthorised access to the protected subject-matter or, at least, of making it difficult to achieve and of seriously discouraging internet users who are using the services of the addressee of that injunction from accessing the subject-matter that has been made available to them in breach of the intellectual property right, that being a matter for the national authorities and courts to establish.
2014-04-10	Case C-435/12 (ACI Adam)	PR	1. EU law, in particular Article 5(2)(b) of Directive 2001/29/EC of the European Parliament and of the Council of 22 May 2001 on the harmonisation of certain aspects of copyright and related rights in the information society, read in conjunction with paragraph 5 of that article, must be interpreted as precluding national legislation, such as that at issue in the main proceedings, which does not distinguish the situation in which the source from which a reproduction for private use is made is lawful from that in which that source is unlawful.; 2. Directive 2004/48/EC of the European Parliament and of the Council of 29 April 2004 on the enforcement of intellectual property rights must be interpreted as not applying to proceedings, such as those in the main proceedings, in which those liable for payment of the fair compensation bring an action before the referring court for a ruling against the body responsible for collecting that remuneration and distributing it to copyright holders, which defends that action.
2014-05-07	Case C-458/13 (Grund)	PR	(Reference withdrawn due to the judgment in case C-355/12 (Nintendo)).
2014-06-05	Case C-360/13 (Public Relations Consultants)	PR	Article 5 of Directive 2001/29/EC of the European Parliament and of the Council of 22 May 2001 on the harmonisation of certain aspects of copyright and related rights in the information society must be interpreted as meaning that the copies on the user's computer screen and the copies in the internet 'cache' of that computer's hard disk, made by an end-user in the course of viewing a website, satisfy the conditions that those copies must be temporary, that they must be transient or incidental in nature and that they must constitute an integral and essential part of a technological process, as well as the conditions laid down in Article 5(5) of that directive, and that they may therefore be made without the authorisation of the copyright holders.
2014-06-06	Case C-98/13 (Martin Blomqvist)	PR	Council Regulation (EC) No 1383/2003 of 22 July 2003 concerning customs action against goods suspected of infringing certain intellectual property rights and the measures to be taken against goods found to have infringed such rights must be interpreted as meaning that the holder of an intellectual property right over goods sold to a person residing in the territory of a Member State through an online sales website in a non-member country enjoys the protection afforded to that holder by that regulation at the time when those goods enter the territory of that Member State merely by virtue of the acquisition of those goods. It is not necessary, in addition, for the goods at issue to have been the subject, prior to the sale, of an offer for sale or advertising targeting consumers of that State.
2014-09-03	Case C-201/13 (Johan Deckmyn)	PR	1. Article 5(3)(k) of Directive 2001/29/EC of the European Parliament and of the Council of 22 May 2001 on the harmonisation of certain aspects of copyright and related rights in the information society, must be interpreted as meaning that the concept of 'parody' appearing in that provision is an autonomous concept of EU law.; 2. Article 5(3)(k) of Directive 2001/29 must be interpreted as meaning that the essential characteristics of parody, are, first, to evoke an existing work, while being noticeably different from it, and secondly, to constitute an expression of humour or mockery. The concept of 'parody', within the meaning of that provision, is not subject to the conditions that the parody should display an original character of its own, other than that of displaying noticeable differences with respect to the original parodied work; that it could reasonably be attributed to a person other than the author of the original work itself; that it should relate to the original work itself or mention the source of the parodied work.; However, the application, in a particular case, of the exception for parody, within the meaning of Article 5(3)(k) of Directive 2001/29, must strike a fair balance between, on the one hand, the interests and rights of persons referred to in Articles 2 and 3 of that directive, and, on the other, the freedom of expression of the user of a protected work who is relying on the exception for parody, within the meaning of Article 5(3)(k). It is for the national court to determine, in the light of all the circumstances of the case in the main proceedings, whether the application of the exception for parody, within the meaning of Article 5(3)(k) of Directive 2001/29, on the assumption that the drawing at issue fulfils the essential requirements of parody, preserves that fair balance.
2014-10-21	Case C-348/13 (BestWater)	PR	(Unofficial translation: The mere fact that a protected work, freely available on an Internet site, is inserted on another website via a link using the technique of "transclusion" ("framing"), as used in the main proceedings, can not be described as "communication to the public" within the meaning of Article 3(1) of Directive 2001/29/EC of the European Parliament and of the Council of 22 May 2001 on the harmonisation of certain aspects of copyright and related rights in the information society, to the extent that the work in question is not transferred to a new public nor communicated following a specific technical mode, different than original communication).
2014-09-11	Case C-117/13 (Technische Universität Darmstadt)	PR	1. The concept of 'purchase or licensing terms' provided for in Article 5(3)(n) of Directive 2001/29/EC of the European Parliament and of the Council of 22 May 2001 on the harmonisation of certain aspects of copyright and related rights in the information society must be understood as requiring that the rightholder and an establishment, such as a publicly accessible library, referred to in that provision must have concluded a licensing agreement in respect of the work in question that sets out the conditions in which that establishment may use that work.; 2. Article 5(3)(n) of Directive 2001/29, read in conjunction with Article 5(2)(c) of that directive, must be interpreted to mean that it does not preclude Member States from granting to publicly accessible libraries covered by those provisions the right to digitise the works contained in their collections, if such act of reproduction is necessary for the purpose of making those works available to users, by means of dedicated terminals, within those establishments.; 3. Article 5(3)(n) of Directive 2001/29 must be interpreted to mean that it does not extend to acts such as the printing out of works on paper or their storage on a USB stick, carried out by users from dedicated terminals installed in publicly accessible libraries covered by that provision. However, such acts may, if appropriate, be authorised under national legislation transposing the exceptions or limitations provided for in Article 5(2)(a) or (b) of that directive provided that, in each individual case, the conditions laid down by those provisions are met.
2015-01-15	Case C-30/14 (Ryanair)	PR	Directive 96/9/EC of the European Parliament and of the Council of 11 March 1996 on the legal protection of databases must be interpreted as meaning that it is not applicable to a database which is not protected either by copyright or by the sui generis right under that directive, so that Articles 6(1), 8 and 15 of that directive do not preclude the author of such a database from laying down contractual limitations on its use by third parties, without prejudice to the applicable national law.
2015-01-22	Case C-419/13 (Art & Allposters)	PR	Article 4(2) of Directive 2001/29/EC of the European Parliament and of the Council of 22 May 2001 on the harmonisation of certain aspects of copyright and related rights in the information society must be interpreted as meaning that the rule of exhaustion of the distribution right set out in Article 4(2) of Directive 2001/29 does not apply in a situation where a reproduction of a protected work, after having been marketed in the European Union with the copyright holder's consent, has undergone an alteration of its medium, such as the transfer of that reproduction from a paper poster onto a canvas, and is placed on the market again in its new form.
2015-02-26	Case C-41/14 (Christie's France)	PR	Article 1(4) of Directive 2001/84/EC of the European Parliament and of the Council of 27 September 2001 on the resale right for the benefit of the author of an original work of art must be interpreted as not precluding the person by whom the resale royalty is payable, designated as such by national law, whether that is the seller or an art market professional involved in the transaction, from agreeing with any other person, including the buyer, that that other person will definitively bear, in whole or in part, the cost of the royalty, provided that a contractual arrangement of that kind does not affect the obligations and liability which the person by whom the royalty is payable has towards the author.
2015-03-05	Case C-463/12 (Copydan Båndkopi)	PR	1. Article 5(2)(b) of Directive 2001/29/EC of the European Parliament and of the Council of 22 May 2001 on the harmonisation of certain aspects of copyright and related rights in the information society does not preclude national legislation which provides that fair compensation is to be paid, in accordance with the exception to the reproduction right for copies made for private use, in respect of multifunctional media such as mobile telephone memory cards, irrespective of whether the main function of such media is to make such copies, provided that one of the functions of the media, be it merely an ancillary function, enables the operator to use them for that purpose. However, the question whether the function is a main or an ancillary one and the relative importance of the medium's capacity to make copies are liable to affect the amount of fair compensation payable. In so far as the prejudice to the rightholder may be regarded as minimal, the making available of such a function need not give rise to an obligation to pay fair compensation.; 2. Article 5(2)(b) of Directive 2001/29 does not preclude national legislation which makes the supply of media that may be used for copying for private use, such as mobile telephone memory cards, subject to the levy intended to finance fair compensation payable in accordance with the exception to the reproduction right for copies for private use, but does not make the supply of components whose main purpose is to store copies for private use, such as the internal memories of MP3 players, subject to that levy, provided that those different categories of media and components are not comparable or the different treatment they receive is justified, which is a matter for the national court to determine.; 3. Article 5(2)(b) of Directive 2001/29 must be interpreted as not precluding national legislation which requires payment of the levy intended to finance fair compensation, in accordance with the exception to the reproduction right for copies for private use, by producers and importers who sell mobile telephone memory cards to business customers and are aware that those cards will be sold on by those customers but do not know whether the final purchasers of the cards will be individuals or business customers, on condition that: – the introduction of such a system is justified by practical difficulties; – the persons responsible for payment are exempt from the levy if they can establish that they have supplied the mobile telephone memory cards to persons other than natural persons for purposes clearly unrelated to copying for private use, it being understood that the exemption cannot be restricted to the supply of business customers registered with the organisation responsible for administering the levy; – the system provides for a right to reimbursement of that levy which is effective and does not make it excessively difficult to repay the levy and only the final purchaser of such a memory card may obtain reimbursement by submitting an appropriate application to that organisation.; 4. Article 5(2)(b) of Directive 2001/29, read in the light of recital 35 in the preamble to that directive, must be interpreted as permitting the Member States to provide, in certain cases covered by the exception to the reproduction right for copies for private use, for an exemption from the requirement under that exception to pay fair compensation, provided that the prejudice caused to rightholders in such cases is minimal. It is within the discretion of the Member States to set the threshold for such prejudice, it being understood that that threshold must, inter alia, be applied in a manner consistent with the principle of equal treatment.; 5. Directive 2001/29 is to be interpreted as meaning that, where a Member State has decided, pursuant to Article 5(2) of that directive, to exclude, from the material scope of that provision, any right for rightholders to authorise reproduction of their works for private use, any authorisation given by a rightholder for the use of files containing his works can have no bearing on the fair compensation payable in accordance with the exception to the reproduction right for reproductions made in accordance with Article 5(2)(b) of that directive with the aid of such files and cannot, of itself, give rise to an obligation on the part of the user of the files concerned to pay remuneration of any kind to the rightholder.; 6. The implementation of technological measures under Article 6 of Directive 2001/29 for devices used to reproduce protected works, such as DVDs, CDs, MP3 players and computers, can have no effect on the requirement to pay fair compensation in accordance with the exception to the reproduction right in respect of reproductions made for private use by means of such devices. However, the implementation of such measures may have an effect on the actual level of such compensation.; 7. Directive 2001/29 precludes national legislation which provides for fair compensation, in accordance with the exception to the reproduction right, in respect of reproductions made using unlawful sources, namely from protected works which are made available to the public without the rightholder's consent.; 8. Directive 2001/29 does not preclude national legislation which provides for fair compensation, in accordance with the exception to the reproduction right, in respect of reproductions of protected works made by a natural person by or with the aid of a device which belongs to a third party.
2015-03-26	Case C-279/13 (C More Entertainment)	PR	Article 3(2) of Directive 2001/29/EC of the European Parliament and of the Council of 22 May 2001 on the harmonisation of certain aspects of copyright and related rights in the information society must be interpreted as not precluding national legislation extending the exclusive right of the broadcasting organisations referred to in Article 3(2)(d) as regards acts of communication to the public which broadcasts of sporting fixtures made live on internet, such as those at issue in the main proceedings, may constitute, provided that such an extension does not undermine the protection of copyright.
2015-05-13	Case C-516/13 (Dimensione Direct Sales)	PR	Article 4(1) of Directive 2001/29/EC of the European Parliament and of the Council of 22 May 2001 on the harmonisation of certain aspects of copyright and related rights in the information society must be interpreted as meaning that it allows a holder of an exclusive right to distribute a protected work to prevent an offer for sale or a targeted advertisement of the original or a copy of that work, even if it is not established that that advertisement gave rise to the purchase of the protected work by an EU buyer, in so far as that advertisement invites consumers of the Member State in which that work is protected by copyright to purchase it.
2015-11-12	Case C-572/13 (Hewlett-Packard Belgium)	PR	1. Article 5(2)(a) and Article 5(2)(b) of Directive 2001/29/EC of the European Parliament and of the Council of 22 May 2001 on the harmonisation of certain aspects of copyright and related rights in the information society must be interpreted as meaning that, with regard to the phrase 'fair compensation' contained in those provisions, it is necessary to draw a distinction according to whether the reproduction on paper or a similar medium effected by the use of any kind of photographic technique or by some other process having similar effects is carried out by any user or by a natural person for private use and for ends that are neither directly nor indirectly commercial.; 2. Article 5(2)(a) and Article 5(2)(b) of Directive 2001/29 preclude national legislation, such as that at issue in the main proceedings, which authorises the Member State in question to allocate a part of the fair compensation payable to rightholders to the publishers of works created by authors, those publishers being under no obligation to ensure that the authors benefit, even indirectly, from some of the compensation of which they have been deprived.; 3. Article 5(2)(a) and Article 5(2)(b) of Directive 2001/29 preclude, in principle, national legislation, such as that at issue in the main proceedings, which introduces an undifferentiated system for recovering fair compensation which also covers the copying of sheet music, and preclude such legislation which introduces an undifferentiated system for recovering fair compensation which also covers counterfeit reproductions made from unlawful sources.; 4. Article 5(2)(a) and Article 5(2)(b) of Directive 2001/29 preclude national legislation, such as that at issue in the main proceedings, which introduces a system that combines, in order to finance the fair compensation payable to rightholders, two forms of remuneration, namely, first, lump-sum remuneration paid prior to the reproduction operation by the manufacturer, importer or intra-Community acquirer of devices enabling protected works to be copied, at the time when such devices are put into circulation on national territory, and, second, proportional remuneration paid after that reproduction operation and determined solely by means of a unit price multiplied by the number of copies produced, which is payable by the natural or legal persons who make those copies, in so far as: – the lump-sum remuneration paid in advance is calculated solely by reference to the speed at which the device concerned is capable of producing copies; – the proportional remuneration recovered after the fact varies according to whether or not the person liable for payment has cooperated in the recovery of that remuneration; – the combined system, taken as a whole, does not include mechanisms, in particular for reimbursement, which allow the complementary application of the criterion of actual harm suffered and the criterion of harm established as a lump sum in respect of different categories of users.
2015-07-16	Case C-580/13 (Coty Germany)	PR	Article 8(3)(e) of Directive 2004/48/EC of the European Parliament and of the Council of 29 April 2004 on the enforcement of intellectual property rights must be interpreted as precluding a national provision, such as that at issue in the main proceedings, which allows, in an unlimited and unconditional manner, a banking institution to invoke banking secrecy in order to refuse to provide, pursuant to Article 8(1)(c) of that directive, information concerning the name and address of an account holder.
2015-11-19	Case C-325/14 (SBS Belgium)	PR	Article 3(1) of Directive 2001/29/EC of the European Parliament and of the Council of 22 May 2001 on the harmonisation of certain aspects of copyright and related rights in the information society, must be interpreted as meaning that a broadcasting organisation does not carry out an act of communication to the public, within the meaning of that provision, when it transmits its programme-carrying signals exclusively to signal distributors without those signals being accessible to the public during, and as a result of that transmission, those distributors then sending those signals to their respective subscribers so that they may watch those programmes, unless the intervention of the distributors in question is just a technical means, which it is for the national court to ascertain.
2016-06-09	Case C-470/14 (EGEDA)	PR	Article 5(2)(b) of Directive 2001/29/EC of the European Parliament and of the Council of 22 May 2001 on the harmonisation of certain aspects of copyright and related rights in the information society must be interpreted as precluding a scheme for fair compensation for private copying which, like the one at issue in the main proceedings, is financed from the General State Budget in such a way that it is not possible to ensure that the cost of that compensation is borne by the users of private copies.
2016-09-15	Case C-484/14 (McFadden)	PR	1. Article 12(1) of Directive 2000/31/EC of the European Parliament and of the Council of 8 June 2000 on certain legal aspects of information society services, in particular electronic commerce, in the internal market ('Directive on electronic commerce'), read in conjunction with Article 2(a) of that directive and with Article 1(2) of Directive 98/34/EC of the European Parliament and of the Council of 22 June 1998 laying down a procedure for the provision of information in the field of technical standards and regulations and of rules on information society services, as amended by Directive 98/48/EC of the European Parliament and of the Council of 20 July 1998, must be interpreted as meaning that a service such as that at issue in the main proceedings, provided by a communication network operator and consisting in making that network available to the general public free of charge constitutes an 'information society service' within the meaning of Article 12(1) of Directive 2000/31 where the activity is performed by the service provider in question for the purposes of advertising the goods sold or services supplied by that service provider.; 2. Article 12(1) of Directive 2000/31 must be interpreted as meaning that, in order for the service referred to in that article, consisting in providing access to a communication network, to be considered to have been provided, that access must not go beyond the boundaries of a technical, automatic and passive process for the transmission of the required information, there being no further conditions to be satisfied.; 3. Article 12(1) of Directive 2000/31 must be interpreted as meaning that the condition laid down in Article 14(1)(b) of that directive does not apply mutatis mutandis to Article 12(1) of Directive 2000/31.; 4. Article 12(1) of Directive 2000/31, read in conjunction with Article 2(b) of that directive, must be interpreted as meaning that there are no conditions, other than the one mentioned in that provision, to which a service provider supplying access to a communication network is subject.; 5. Article 12(1) of Directive 2000/31 must be interpreted as meaning that a person harmed by the infringement of its rights over a work is precluded from claiming compensation from an access provider on the ground that the connection to that network was used by a third party to infringe its rights and the reimbursement of the costs of giving formal notice or court costs incurred in relation to its claim for compensation. However, that article must be interpreted as meaning that it does not preclude such a person from claiming injunctive relief against the continuation of that infringement and the payment of the costs of giving formal notice and court costs from a communication network access provider whose services were used in that infringement where such claims are made for the purposes of obtaining, or follow the grant of injunctive relief by a national authority or court to prevent that service provider from allowing the infringement to continue.; 6. Having regard to the requirements deriving from the protection of fundamental rights and to the rules laid down in Directives 2001/29 and 2004/48, Article 12(1) of Directive 2000/31, read in conjunction with Article 12(3) of that directive, must be interpreted as, in principle, not precluding the grant of an injunction such as that at issue in the main proceedings, which requires, on pain of payment of a fine, a provider of access to a communication network allowing the public to connect to the internet to prevent third parties from making a particular copyright-protected work or parts thereof available to the general public from an online (peer-to-peer) exchange platform via an internet connection, where that provider may choose which technical measures to take in order to comply with the injunction even if such a choice is limited to a single measure consisting in password-protecting the internet connection, provided that those users are required to reveal their identity in order to obtain the required password and may not therefore act anonymously, a matter which it is for the referring court to ascertain.
2016-09-08	Case C-160/15 (GS Media)	PR	Article 3(1) of Directive 2001/29/EC of the European Parliament and of the Council of 22 May 2001 on the harmonisation of certain aspects of copyright and related rights in the information society must be interpreted as meaning that, in order to establish whether the fact of posting, on a website, hyperlinks to protected works, which are freely available on another website without the consent of the copyright holder, constitutes a 'communication to the public' within the meaning of that provision, it is to be determined whether those links are provided without the pursuit of financial gain by a person who did not know or could not reasonably have known the illegal nature of the publication of those works on that other website or whether, on the contrary, those links are provided for such a purpose, a situation in which that knowledge must be presumed.
2016-03-17	Case C-99/15 (Liffers)	PR	Article 13(1) of Directive 2004/48/EC of the European Parliament and of the Council of 29 April 2004 on the enforcement of intellectual property rights must be interpreted as permitting a party injured by an intellectual property infringement, who claims compensation for his material damage as calculated, in accordance with heading (b) of the second subparagraph of Article 13(1) of that directive, on the basis of the amount of royalties or fees which would have been due to him if the infringer had requested his authorisation to use that right, also to claim compensation for the moral prejudice that he has suffered, as provided for under heading (a) of the second subparagraph of Article 13(1) of that directive.
2016-09-22	Case C-110/15 (Nokia Italia)	PR	EU law, in particular, Article 5(2)(b) of Directive 2001/29/EC of the European Parliament and of the Council of 22 May 2001 on the harmonisation of certain aspects of copyright and related rights in the information society, must be interpreted as precluding national legislation, such as that at issue in the main proceedings, that, on the one hand, subjects exemption from payment of the private copying levy for producers and importers of devices and media intended for use clearly unrelated to private copying to the conclusion of agreements between an entity which has a legal monopoly on the representation of the interests of authors of works, and those liable to pay compensation, or their trade associations, and, on the other hand, provides that the reimbursement of such a levy, where it has been unduly paid, may be requested only by the final user of those devices and media.
