= Conditional Access Convention =

Convention of the Council of Europe

European Convention on the Legal Protection of Services based on, or consisting of, Conditional Access
- Signed: 24 January 2001
- Location: Strasbourg
- Effective: 1 July 2003
- Condition: 3 ratifications
- Signatories: 11
- Parties: 7 COE states and the European Union
- Depositary: Secretary General of the Council of Europe
- Languages: English and French

The Conditional Access Convention, formally the European Convention on the Legal Protection of Services based on, or consisting of, Conditional Access is a convention of the Council of Europe, designed to prevent unauthorized access to services protected by conditional access. The convention is based on the Conditional Access Directive which already required European Union member states to enact similar legislation.

Parties to the convention must outlaw the manufacture, importation, distribution, sale, rental, possession, installation, maintenance, replacement, or commercial promotion, marketing, or advertising of "illicit devices". The convention defines "illicit devices" as equipment and software which bypasses conditional access measures for television, radio broadcasting, and "information society services".

As of September 2015, seven COE members as well as the European Union are party to the convention, covering in total 31 states.
