= Satellite and Cable Directive =

1993 European Union directive

Directive 93/83/EEC
- European Union directive
- Title: Directive on the coordination of certain rules concerning copyright and rights related to copyright applicable to satellite broadcasting and cable retransmission
- Made by: Council of the European Union
- Made under: Arts. 57(2), 66 & 100a
- Journal reference: L248, 1993-10-06, pp. 15–21

History
- Date made: 27 September 1993
- Entry into force: 6 October 1993
- Implementation date: 1 January 1995

Preparative texts
- Commission proposal: C255, 1991-10-01, p. 3 C25, 1993-01-28, p. 43
- EESC opinion: C98, 1992-04-21, p. 44
- EP opinion: C305, 1992-11-23, p. 129
- Reports

Other legislation
- Replaces: —
- Amends: —
- Amended by: Directive 2019/789 of 17 April 2019
- Replaced by: —

The Satellite and Cable Directive (frequently shortened to SatCab Directive), formally the Council Directive 93/83/EEC of 27 September 1993 on the coordination of certain rules concerning copyright and rights related to copyright applicable to satellite broadcasting and cable retransmission, is a European Union directive that governs the application of copyright and related rights to satellite and cable television in the European Union. It was made under the internal market provisions of the Treaty of Rome.

== Satellite broadcasting ==
An author has the exclusive right to authorise or prohibit the broadcasting of his or her works by satellite (Art. 2). This right may only be subject to a compulsory licensing scheme when the satellite broadcast is simultaneous with a terrestrial broadcast [Art. 3(2)]. Satellite broadcasting is assimilated to terrestrial broadcasting for the purposes of related rights (rights of performers, phonogram producers and broadcasting organisations) (Art. 4): the protection of these rights is governed by Directive 92/100/EEC.

== Cable retransmission ==
The main effect of the Directive is to stipulate that cable retransmission must be on the basis of contractual, not statutory, licences with copyright holders, although existing statutory licence schemes were permitted to remain in force until the end of 1997 (Art. 8). These licences may only be granted or refused by collecting societies [Art. 9(1)], which effectively makes such societies compulsory: a collecting society may be deemed to be mandated to manage the cable retransmission rights of a copyright holder in the absence of any expressive agreement [Art. 9(2)]. Broadcasting organisations are free to exercise their own related rights to license or prohibit the cable retransmission of their own broadcasts (Art. 10). The Directive also provides for mediation in disputes between cable operators and collecting societies (Art. 11) and for measures to prevent abuse of monopoly powers (Art. 12).

== Implementation ==
Implementation of the Directive by Member States
(Austria)	Austria	Urheberrechtsgesetznovelle 1996 No. 151
(Belgium)	Belgium	Loi du 30 juin 1994 relative au droit d'auteur et aux droits voisins, chapter III
(Bulgaria)	Bulgaria	unknown
(Cyprus)	Cyprus	unknown
(Czech Republic)	Czech Republic	Law No. 121/2000 Coll. of 7 April 2000 on Copyright, Rights Related to Copyright and on the Amendment of Certain Laws
(Denmark)	Denmark	Act on Copyright 1995 No. 395
(Estonia)	Estonia	unknown
(Finland)	Finland	unknown
(France)	France	Loi n^{o} 97-283 du 27 mars 1997 portant transposition dans le code de la propriété intellectuelle des directives du Conseil des Communautés européennes n^{os} 93/83 du 27 septembre 1993 et 93/98 du 29 octobre 1993
(Germany)	Germany	Law of 08.05.1998
(Greece)	Greece	Law No. 2557/1997, Official Journal A271/1997
(Hungary)	Hungary	unknown
(Republic of Ireland)	Ireland	unknown
(Italy)	Italy	Decreto legislativo del 23/10/1996 n. 581, attuazione della direttiva 93/83/CEE per il coordinamento di alcune norme in materia di diritto d'autore e diritti connessi applicabili alla radiodiffusione e alla ritrasmissione via cavo, Gazzetta Ufficiale
(Latvia)	Latvia	Autortiesību likums (2000-04-06)
(Lithuania)	Lithuania	Autorių teisių ir gretutinių teisių įstatimas N. VIII-1185 (1999-05-18)
(Luxembourg)	Luxembourg	Loi du 8 septembre 1997
(Malta)	Malta	Copyright Act, 2000
(Netherlands)	Netherlands	unknown
(Poland)	Poland	unknown
(Portugal)	Portugal	Decreto-Lei n. 333/97, de 27 de Novembro de 1997
(Romania)	Romania	unknown
(Slovakia)	Slovakia	Copyright Act of 1997-12-05 (No. 383/1997)
(Slovenia)	Slovenia	Zakon o avtorskih in sorodnih pravicah (1995-03-30)
(Spain)	Spain	Ley 28/1995, de 11 de octubre, de incorporación al Derecho español de la Directiva 93/83/CEE, del Consejo, de 27 de septiembre, sobre coordinación de determinadas disposiciones relativas a los derechos de autor y derechos afines a los derechos de autor en el ámbito de la radiodifusión vía satélite y de la distribución por cable
(Sweden)	Sweden	unknown
(United Kingdom)	United Kingdom	Copyright and Related Rights Regulations 1996 No. 2967

== See also ==
- Copyright law of the European Union
- Broadcast piracy

== Literature ==
- Auer, Günter (1997), "Die Umsetzung urheberrechtlicher Richtlinien am Beispiel der Satellitenrichtlinie", in Dittrich, Robert (ed.), Beiträge zum Urheberrecht V, Wien: Manz, pp. 19–40, ISBN 3-214-07718-X
- Castendyk, Oliver; Albrecht, Martin von (1992), "Der Richtlinienvorschlag der EG-Kommission zum Satellitenfernsehen: Eine Stellungnahme aus der Sicht der Praxis", Gewerblicher Rechtsschutz und Urheberrecht, Internationaler Teil, 41 (10): 734–739
- Cohen Jehoram, Herman (1994), "The EC Copyright Directives, Economics and Authors' Rights", International Review of Intellectual Property and Competition Law, 25 (6): 821–839
- Desurmont, Thierry (1993), "Chronique de la Communauté Européenne", Revue internationale du droit d'auteur, 155: 88–161
- Dreier, Thomas (2010), "Satellite and Cable Directive", in Walter, Michel M.; Lewinski, Silke von (eds.), European Copyright Law: A Commentary, Oxford: Oxford University Press, pp. 391–498, ISBN 978-0-19-922732-7
- Dreier, Thomas (1996), "The Cable and Satellite Analogy", in Hugenholtz, P. Bernt (ed.), The Future of Copyright in a Digital Environment: Proceedings of the Royal Academy Colloquium (Amsterdam, 6–7 July 1995), Den Haag: Kluwer, pp. 57–65, ISBN 90-411-0267-1
- Dreier, Thomas (1991), "Broadcasting and copyright in the internal market: the new proposal by the EC Commission concerning cable and satellite broadcasts", European Intellectual Property Review, 13 (2): 42–46
- Hugenholtz, P. Bernt (2016), "Council Directive 93/83/EC (Satellite and Cable Directive)", in Dreier, Thomas; Hugenholtz, P. Bernt (eds.), Concise European Copyright Law (2nd ed.), Alphen aan den Rijn: Kluwer, pp. 309–334, ISBN 978-90-411-2879-9
- Hugenholtz, P. Bernt (2016), "Making the Digital Single Market Work for Copyright: Extending the Satellite & Cable Directive to content services on line", in Franzosi, Mario; Pollicino, Oreste; Campus, Gianluca (eds.), The Digital Single Market Copyright: Internet and Copyright Law in the European Perspective: Conference proceedings, Milan, 4–5 November 2015, Ariccia: Aracne, pp. 51–65, ISBN 978-88-548-9441-9
- Hugenholtz, P. Bernt (2009), "SatCab Revisited: The Past, Present and Future of the Satellite and Cable Directive", in European Audiovisual Observatory (ed.), Convergence, Copyrights and Transfrontier Television, Strasbourg, pp. 7–19
- Kern, Philippe (1993), "The EC "common position" on copyright applicable to satellite broadcasting and cable retransmission", European Intellectual Property Review, 15 (8): 276–283
- Khan, Bryan (2023), "Copyright in Broadcast Transmissions and the Investment-Protection Rationale", in Bonadio, Enrico; Goold, Patrick (eds.), The Cambridge Handbook of Investment-Driven Intellectual Property, Cambridge: Cambridge University Press, pp. 203–226, ISBN 978-1-108-83919-8
- Lund, Astri M. (1997), "Satellittoverføring av fjernsyns- og radioprogram", in Hagstrøm, Viggo; Lødrup, Peter; Aarbakke, Magnus (eds.), Ånd og rett: Festskrift til Birger Stuevold Lassen på 70-årsdagen 19. august 1997, Oslo: Universitetsforlaget, pp. 695–714, ISBN 82-00-12697-8
- McKnight, Elizabeth (1995), "Exclusive licensing of television programmes: the Cable and Satellite Directive", Entertainment Law Review, 6 (7): 287–291
- Pichler, Marie-Helen (1994), "EG-Richtlinie über Urheberrecht, Satellitenrundfunk und Kabelweiterverbreitung vom 27. September 1993", Medien und Recht, 12 (2): 54–56
- Rosén, Jan (2021), "The Satellite and Cable Directive", in Stamatoudi, Irini; Torremans, Paul (eds.), EU Copyright Law: A Commentary (2nd ed.), Cheltenham: Elgar, pp. 151–179, ISBN 978-1-78643-779-2
- Schulte zu Sundern, Friederike (2019), "Die Aktualisierung der SatCab-RL und ihre Umsetzung in nationales Recht: Ein erster Überblick", Zeitschrift für Geistiges Eigentum, 11 (4): 452–484, doi:10.1628/zge-2019-0028, S2CID 239369967
- Ullrich, Jan N. (2009), Urheberrecht und Satellitenrundfunk: Kollisionsrecht und materielles Recht, Berlin: Berliner Wissenschafts-Verlag, ISBN 978-3-8305-1693-4
