= Conditional Access Directive =

EU intellectual property directive

Directive 98/84/EC
- European Union directive
- Title: Directive on the legal protection of services based on, or consisting of, conditional access
- Made by: European Parliament & Council
- Made under: Art. 57(2), 66 & 100a
- Journal reference: L320, 1998-11-28, pp. 54–57.

History
- Date made: 1998-11-20
- Entry into force: 1998-11-28
- Implementation date: 2000-05-28

Preparative texts
- Commission proposal: C14, 1997-10-16, p. 7 C203, 1998-06-30, p. 12
- EESC opinion: C129, 1998-04-27, p. 16
- EP opinion: C152, 1998-05-18, p. 59
- Reports

Other legislation
- Replaces: —
- Amends: —
- Amended by: —
- Replaced by: —

Directive 98/84/EC of the European Parliament and of the Council of 20 November 1998 on the legal protection of services based on, or consisting of, conditional access is a European Union directive in the field of intellectual property law, made under the internal market provisions of the Treaty of Rome. The Directive covers "conditional access services", which are defined as television or radio broadcasts or internet services to which "access [...] in an intelligible form is made conditional upon prior individual authorisation" and payment. Examples are pay-per-view and encrypted television and internet sites which charge for access.

Member States may not restrict the provision of conditional access services which originate in another Member State [Art. 3(2)]. Devices intended to circumvent the access restrictions are prohibited (Art. 4).

The convention formed the basis for the Conditional Access Convention, a convention of the Council of Europe, to which the European Union is a party.

== See also ==
- Copyright law of the European Union

Enforcement of intellectual property rights in the European Union
Directive 98/84/EC (Conditional access) • Directive 2001/29/EC (DRM) • Directive 2004/48/EC (Civil enforcement) • Regulation (EC) No 1383/2003 (Customs enforcement)
