= Resale Rights Directive =

Directive 2001/84/EC
- European Union directive
- Title: Directive on the resale right for the benefit of the author of an original work of art
- Made by: European Parliament & Council
- Made under: Art. 95
- Journal reference: L272, 2001-10-13, pp. 32–36

History
- Date made: 27 September 2001
- Entry into force: 13 October 2001
- Implementation date: 1 January 2006

Preparative texts
- Commission proposal: C178, 1996-06-21, p. 16; C125, 1998-04-23, p. 8
- EESC opinion: C75, 1997-03-10, p. 17
- EP opinion: C132, 1997-04-28, p. 88

Other legislation
- Replaces: —
- Amends: —
- Amended by: —
- Replaced by: —

Directive 2001/84/EC of the European Parliament and of the Council of 27 September 2001 on the resale right for the benefit of the author of an original work of art is a European Union directive in the field of copyright law, made under the internal market provisions of the Treaty of Rome. It creates a right under European Union law for artists to receive royalties on their works when they are resold. This right, often known by its French name droit de suite, appears in the Berne Convention for the Protection of Literary and Artistic Works (as Art. 14ter) and already existed in many, but not all, Member States. As a result, there was a tendency for sellers of works of art to sell them in countries without droit de suite provisions (e.g. United Kingdom) to avoid paying the royalty. This was deemed to be a distortion of the internal market (paras. 8–11 of the preamble), leading to the Directive.

== Application of the droit de suite ==
For the droit de suite to apply, the work, the sale and the artist must all qualify. The work must be an original work of art or a copy made in limited numbers by the artist himself or under his authority, including "works of graphic or plastic art such as pictures, collages, paintings, drawings, engravings, prints, lithographs, sculptures, tapestries, ceramics, glassware and photographs" (Art. 2), and under copyright protection [Art. 8(1)]. The sale must involve a professional party or intermediary, such as salesrooms, art galleries and, in general, any dealers in works of art [Art. 1(2)]. The droit de suite does not apply to sales directly between private individuals without the participation of an art market professional, nor to sales by individuals to public museums (para. 18 of the preamble). The artist must be a national of a Member State or of another country which has droit de suite provisions: Member States are free, but not obliged, to treat artists domiciled on their territory as nationals (Art. 7).

== Royalty rate ==
Member States may set a minimum sale price below which the droit de suite will not apply: this may not be more than €3000 (Art. 3), or €10,000 where the seller acquired the work of art directly from the artist less than three years before the resale.

Portion of the net sale price	Royalty rate (Art. 4)
<€50,000	4%
€50,000 – €200,000	3%
€200,000 – €350,000	1%
€350,000 – €500,000	0.5%
>€500,000	0.25%

Member States may apply a rate of 5% for the lowest portion of the resale price [Art. 4(2)]. The total amount of the royalty may not exceed €12,500: this corresponds to a net sale price of €2,000,000 using the normal royalty rates.

== Beneficiaries ==
The droit de suite is an inalienable right of the artist, and may not be transferred except to heirs on death, nor waived even in advance [Arts. 1(1), 6(1)]. Member States may provide for the optional or compulsory collective management by collecting societies [Art. 6(2)]. As a transitional provision, Member States which did not previously have droit de suite provisions may limit the application to works of living artists until 2010-01-01 [Art. 8(2)].

== Implementation ==
The provisions of the Directive are transcribed into United Kingdom law by the Artist's Resale Right Regulations 2006 (S.I. 2006/346), covering work resold at a price not less than €1000 (or €10 000 as noted above).

== See also ==
- Copyright law of the European Union
