= Copyright law of the European Union =

European Union copyright protections

Copyright law within the European Union is largely harmonized, although differences between member states exist. The body of law was implemented in the EU through a number of directives, which the member states need to enact into their national law. The main copyright directives are the Copyright Term Directive 2006, the Information Society Directive and the Directive on Copyright in the Digital Single Market. Copyright in the Union is furthermore dependent on international conventions to which the European Union or their member states are part of, such as TRIPS Agreement or the Berne Convention.

== History ==
Attempts to harmonise copyright law in Europe (and beyond) can be dated to the signature of the Berne Convention for the Protection of Literary and Artistic Works on 9 September 1886: all European Union Member States are parties of the Berne Convention, and compliance with its dispositions is now obligatory before accession. The first major step taken by the European Economic Community to harmonise copyright laws came with the decision to apply common standard for the copyright protection of computer programs, enacted in the Computer Programs Directive in 1991. A common term of copyright protection, 70 years from the death of the author, was established in 1993 as the Copyright Duration Directive.

The implementation of directives on copyright has been rather more controversial than for many other subjects, as can be seen by the six judgments for non-transposition of the Information Society Directive. Traditionally, copyright laws vary considerably between member states, particularly between civil law and common law jurisdictions. Changes in copyright law have also become linked to protests against the World Trade Organization and globalisation in general.

== Sources of law ==
The first decisions of the European Court of Justice covering copyright were made under the non-discrimination provision of Article 6 EC (formerly Art. 7), and under the provisions of Article 36 which allows for restrictions on trade between Member States if justified by the protection of industrial and commercial property (including copyright). The directives were made under the internal market provisions of the treaties, notably Article 95 EC (formerly Art. 100a)

== Protected rights ==
The following rights are protected by European Union law:

- right of reproduction for authors, performers, producers of phonograms and films and broadcasting organisations
- right of communication to the public for authors, performers, producers of phonograms and films and broadcasting organisations
- right of distribution for authors and for performers, producers of phonograms and films and broadcasting organisations
- right of fixation for performers and broadcasting organisations
- right of rental and/or lending for authors, performers, producers of phonograms and films, with an associated right of equitable remuneration for lending and/or rental for authors and performers
- right of broadcasting for performers, producers of phonograms and broadcasting organisations
- right of communication to the public by satellite and cable for authors, performers, producers of phonograms and broadcasting organisations
- right of computer program reproduction, distribution and rental for authors

Moral rights are usually considered to be a matter for the national laws of the Member States, although some countries classify some of the above rights, especially the right of communication to the public, among the moral rights of the author rather than under his rights of exploitation.

=== Duration of protection ===
The rights of authors are protected within their lifetime and for 70 years after their death; this includes the resale rights of artists. For films and other audiovisual works, the 70-year period applies from the last death among the following people, whether or not they are considered to be authors of the work by the national law of the Member State: the principal director (who is always considered to be an author of the audiovisual work), the author of the screenplay, the author of the dialogue and the composer of music specifically created for use in the cinematographic or audiovisual work.

The rights of performers last for 50 years from the distribution or communication of the performance, or for 50 years from the performance itself if it had never been communicated to the public during this period. The rights of phonogram producers last for 50 years after publication of the phonogram, or for 50 years after its communication to the public if it had never been published during that period, or for 50 years after its creation if it had never been communicated to the public. The rights of film producers last for 50 years after the communication of the film to the public, or for 50 years after its creation if it had never been communicated to the public during that period. The rights of broadcasting organisations last for 50 years after the first transmission of a broadcast. The European Commission proposed this be extended to 95 years and following this suggestion the European Parliament passed legislation to increase the term to 70 years.

Where a work enjoyed a longer period of protection under national law on 1 July 1995, its period of protection is not shortened. Otherwise, these terms of protection apply to all works which were protected in a Member State of the European Economic Area on 1 July 1995. This provision had the effect of restoring the copyrights in certain works which had entered the public domain in countries with shorter copyright terms. The EU Information Society Directive modified the term of protection of phonograms, calculating from the date of publication instead of from an earlier date of communication to the public, but did not restore the protection of phonograms which had entered the public domain under the former rules. All periods of protection run until 31 December of the year in which they expire.

=== Resale right ===
The Resale Rights Directive created a right for the creators of works of art to participate in the proceeds of the resale of their work. This right, which is sometime known by its French name droit de suite, is personal to the artist and can only be transferred by inheritance. It is calculated as a proportion of the resale price (net of tax), which varies between 4 and 5 percent for the portion of the resale price up to EUR 50,000 and 0.25% for the portion of the resale price above EUR 500,000. The total royalty is limited at EUR 12,500, equivalent to a resale price of EUR 2,000,000. Member States may choose to exempt sales of less than EUR 3000 from royalty. Works of art which are covered by this resale right are "works of graphic or plastic art such as pictures, collages, paintings, drawings, engravings, prints, lithographs, sculptures, tapestries, ceramics, glassware and photographs, provided they are made by the artist herself or himself or are copies which have been made in limited numbers by the artist or under his or her authority."

=== Database rights ===
The Database Directive created a sui generis protection for databases which do not meet the criterion of originality for copyright protection. It is specifically intended to protect "the investment of considerable human, technical and financial resources" in creating databases (para. 7 of the preamble), whereas the copyright laws of many Member States specifically exclude effort and labour from the criteria for copyright protection. To qualify, the database must show "qualitatively and/or quantitatively a substantial investment in either the obtaining, verification or presentation of the contents". Their creators have the right "to prevent extraction and/or re-utilization of the whole or of a substantial part, evaluated qualitatively and/or quantitatively, of the contents of that database." This is taken to include the repeated extraction of insubstantial parts of the contents if this conflicts with the normal exploitation of the database or unreasonably prejudices the legitimate interests of the creator of the database.

Member States may limit this right in the following cases:

- extraction for private use from a non-electronic database;
- extraction for the purposes of teaching or research, to the extent justified by the non-commercial purpose;
- extraction and/or reutilisation for the purposes of public security or an administrative or judicial procedure.

Database rights last for fifteen years from:

- the "completion" of the database, that is to say the point at which the criterion of substantial investment is fulfilled, or from
- the date at which the database is made available to the public, whichever is the later. The protection period runs until 31 December of the year in which it expires. If there is a "substantial change" in the database which would be qualified as a "substantial new investment", a new protection period is granted for the resulting database.

== Limitations ==
Temporary copying which is the result of the transmission of a work or of its legal use is not covered by the exclusive right of reproduction.

Member states can implement other limitations from the list in Information Society Directive Article 5, or retain limitations which were already in force on 22 June 2001. Permitted limitations are:

- art. 5.2(a) paper reproductions by photocopying or similar methods, except of sheet music, if there is compensation for rightsholders;
- art. 5.2(b) reproductions made for private and non-commercial use if there is compensation for rightholders;
- art. 5.2(c) reproductions by public libraries, educational institutions or archives for non-commercial use;
- art. 5.2(d) preservation of recordings of broadcasts in official archives;
- art. 5.2(e) reproductions of broadcasts by social, non-commercial institutions such as hospitals and prisons, if there is compensation to rightholders;
- art. 5.3(a) use for illustration for teaching or scientific research, to the extent justified by the non-commercial purpose;
- art. 5.3(b) uses directly related to a disability, to the extent justified by the disability;
- art. 5.3(c) press reviews and news reporting;
- art. 5.3(d) quotations for the purposes of criticism or review;
- art. 5.3(e) uses for the purposes of public security or in administrative, parliamentary or judicial proceedings;
- art. 5.3(f) uses of political speeches and extracts of public lectures, to the extent justified by public information;
- art. 5.3(g) uses during religious or official celebrations;
- art. 5.3(h) uses of works, such as architecture or sculpture, which are located permanently in public places;
- art. 5.3(i) incidental inclusion in another work;
- art. 5.3(j) use for the advertisement of the public exhibition or sale of art;
- art. 5.3(k) caricature, parody or pastiche;
- art. 5.3(l) use in connection with the demonstration or repair of equipment;
- art. 5.3(m) use of a protected work (e.g., plans) for the reconstruction of a building;
- art. 5.3(n) communication of works to the public within the premises of public libraries, educational institutions, museums or archives.

No new limitations may come into force after 22 June 2001 except those in the permitted limitations given in the Information Society Directive. Limitations may only be applied in balance with the Berne three-step test that asks the exceptions be "certain special cases which do not conflict with a normal exploitation of the work or other subject-matter and do not unreasonably prejudice the legitimate interests of the rightholder". However it was agreed at the time of drafting the WIPO Copyright and Performances and Phonograms Treaties that this wording "neither reduces nor extends the scope of applicability of the limitations and exceptions permitted by the Berne Convention."

This explicit list of exceptions stands in contrast to the open-ended Fair Use doctrine employed by the United States, and the European Union has typically been staunchly against considering frameworks resembling Fair Use. The use of short snippets of news articles in aggregation sites like Google News, covered by fair use in the United States, has been the subject of dispute between Google and European governments, following the passage of ancillary copyright for press publishers in Germany and the Directive on Copyright in the Digital Single Market EU-wide.

== Protection of rights ==
The Enforcement Directive covers the remedies that are available in the civil courts and harmonises the rules on standing, evidence, interlocutory measures, seizure and injunctions, damages and costs and judicial publication. Germany recognises the so-called GEMA Vermutung whereby the burden of proof is on the alleged infringer in an infringement lawsuit.

== Collection monopolies ==
Copyright collecting societies in the European Union usually hold monopolies in their respective national markets. Some countries create a statutory monopoly, while others recognise effective monopolies through regulations. In Austria, the Society of Authors, Composers and Publishers (Gesellschaft der Autoren, Komponisten und Musikverleger, AKM) has a statutory monopoly. German law recognizes GEMA as an effective monopoly, and consequently the burden of proof is on the accused infringer that a work is not managed by GEMA.

== See also ==
- Anti-Counterfeiting Trade Agreement (ACTA)
- Copyright Duration Directive
- European Pirate Party
- European Union 70-year recording copyright extension
- EU copyright case-law
- Directive on Copyright in the Digital Single Market

European copyright law is harmonised to a large extent. However, EU legislation allows for differences in the manner of member state application. Pages related to specific copyright acts are listed below:

- Copyright law of France
- Copyright law of Germany
- Copyright law of Ireland
- Copyright law of the Netherlands
- Copyright law of Poland
- Copyright law of Romania
- Copyright law of Spain
