= Rental Directive =

Directive 92/100/EEC
- European Union directive
- Title: Directive on rental right and lending right and on certain rights related to copyright in the field of intellectual property
- Made by: Council of the European Union
- Made under: Arts. 57(2), 66 & 100a
- Journal reference: L346, 1992-11-27, p. 61

History
- Date made: 19 November 1992
- Entry into force: 27 November 1992
- Implementation date: 1 July 1994

Preparative texts
- Commission proposal: C53, 1991-02-28, p. 35; C128, 1992-05-20, p. 8
- EESC opinion: C269, 1991-10-14, p. 54
- EP opinion: C67, 1992-03-16, p. 92
- Reports

Other legislation
- Replaces: —
- Amends: —
- Amended by: Directive 93/98/EEC, Directive 2001/29/EC
- Replaced by: Directive 2006/115/EC;

Directive 92/100/EEC is a European Union directive in the field of copyright law, made under the internal market provisions of the Treaty of Rome. It creates a "rental and lending right" as a part of copyright protection, and sets out minimum standards of protection for the related rights of performers, phonogram and film producers and broadcasting organizations.

== Rental and lending right ==
The following rightsholders have the exclusive right, subject to limitations, to authorize or prohibit the rental or lending of their works [Art. 2(1)]:

- authors in respect of the original and copies of their works (except buildings and applied art);
- performers in respect of fixations of their performance;
- phonogram producers in respect of his phonograms; and
- producers of the first fixation of films in respect of the original and copies of their films.

This list is limitative: Portugal has been censured by the European Court of Justice for creating a lending and rental right in favor of videogame producers, as this annulled the exclusive nature of the rights of film producers.

The rental and lending right may be transferred, and is presumed to be transferred in film production contracts unless they contain provisions to the contrary [Art. 2(5)]: Member States may extend the presumption to authors and performers. However, even once the rental and lending right is transferred, the author or performer retains an inalienable and unaidable right to equitable compensation for the rental and lending of their works: this compensation is administered by the collecting societies.

Member States may allow a derogation for public lending (i.e. public libraries) provided that authors obtain some royalties [Art. 5(1)]. Member States may also exempt "certain categories of establishments" from the payment of royalties [Art. 5(2)]. These provisions is interpreted strictly: Portugal has been censured for a transposition which effectively exempted all public institutions from payment of royalties, and Belgium for failing to set a rate of remuneration (making its collection impossible).

Several countries already had Public Lending Right systems. However, the European Commission pointed out in a report in 2002 that many of these PLR systems failed to correctly implement the directive.

== Related rights ==
The Directive sets out the minimum rights which Member States must accord to performers, phonogram and film producers and broadcasting organizations (related rights), based closely on the provisions of the Rome Convention for the Protection of Performers, Producers of Phonograms and Broadcasting Organizations.

Subsequent legal harmonization has occurred through the 2001/29/EC Directive, extending the duration and scope of related rights in the digital space, including specific provisions addressing the internet and digital technologies' impact on performers and producers.

The preamble is clear (para. 20) that Member States may go beyond this minimum protection if they so wish. The fixation right (Art. 6) for performers with respect to their performances and broadcasting organizations with respect to their broadcasts is the exclusive right to authorize or prohibit recording. The reproduction right (Art. 7) is the exclusive right to authorize or prohibit reproduction:

- for performers, of fixations of their performances,
- for phonogram producers, of their phonograms,
- for producers of the first fixations of films, in respect of the original and copies of their films, and
- for broadcasting organizations, of fixations of their broadcasts.

The distribution right (Art. 9) is the exclusive right to make available to the public, for sale or otherwise, subject to the first-sale doctrine:

- for performers, in respect of fixations of their performances,
- for phonogram producers, in respect of their phonograms,
- for producers of the first fixations of films, in respect of the original and copies of their films,
- for broadcasting organizations, in respect of fixations of their broadcasts.

The fixation right, by its nature, is personal: the reproduction and distribution rights may be transferred, assigned or licensed.

Performers have the exclusive right to authorize or prohibit the broadcasting of their live performances, but not of recordings nor of rebroadcasts [Art. 8(1)]. Broadcasting organizations have the exclusive right to authorize or prohibit the rebroadcasting of their broadcasts "by wireless means", and the communication of their broadcasts to the public in places which charge an entrance fee [Art. 8(3)]. Phonogram producers have the right to an equitable remuneration (which may be fixed by agreement or regulation) if their published recordings are broadcast or played in public: this royalty is shared with the performers [Art. 8(2)].

The limitations on related rights are of the same nature as limitations on copyright. Four possible limitations are explicitly mentioned in Article 10:

- private use;
- use of short excerpts in connection with the reporting of current events;
- ephemeral fixation by a broadcasting organization by means of its own facilities and for its own broadcasts;
- use solely for the purposes of teaching or scientific research.

This article is an almost verbatim copy of Article 15 of the Rome Convention.

== Duration ==
The Directive originally fixed minimum periods of protection for the authors' rights and related rights which it created (Arts. 11, 12) in line with the Berne Convention for the Protection of Literary and Artistic Works and the Rome Convention "without prejudice to further harmonization". The further harmonization came with the Directive harmonizing the term of protection of copyright and certain related rights, which fixed the protection periods across the EU and repealed these two articles. The Directive 93/98/EEC harmonized protection periods across EU member states, and in 2019, additional revisions aligned these protections with the Directive on Copyright in the Digital Single Market, considering evolving issues like streaming and digital media distribution.

Rights	Directive 92/100/EEC minimum	Directive 93/98/EEC harmonized
Authors' rights	50 years from the death of the author	70 years from the death of the author
Related rights (of performers, phonogram producers and broadcasting organisations)	20 years from the date of fixation, performance or broadcast	50 years from the date of publication or broadcast, or from the date of fixation, performance in the case of unpublished works

== Implementation ==
Over time, various member states have revised their implementation laws to reflect newer directives, such as Directive 2019/790 on copyright in the Digital Single Market, which provides new guidelines on digital content and cross-border licensing.

Implementation of the Directive by Member States
(Austria)	Austria	Urheberrechtsgesetznovelle 1993, BGBl. No. 93/1993, p. 1166
(Belgium)	Belgium	Loi relative au droit d'auteur et aux droits voisins du 30 juin 1994
(Bulgaria)	Bulgaria	unknown
(Cyprus)	Cyprus	unknown
(Czech Republic)	Czech Republic	Law No. 121/2000 Coll. of 7 April 2000 on Copyright, Rights Related to Copyright and on the Amendment of Certain Laws
(Denmark)	Denmark	Act No. 706 of 1998-09-29; Act No. 21 of 2000-01-11; Executive Order of 2000-03-29
(Estonia)	Estonia	unknown
(Finland)	Finland	Act No. 446/1995; Act No. 967/1997
(France)	France	Loi No. 92-597 du 1er juillet 1992, JORF No. 153 du 3 juillet 1992
(Germany)	Germany	Act of 1995-06-23, BGB1 I p. 842
(Greece)	Greece	Law No. 2121/93, Official Journal A No. 25
(Hungary)	Hungary	unknown
(Republic of Ireland)	Ireland	unknown
(Italy)	Italy	Decree No. 685 of 1994-11-16, GU Gen. No. 293 of 1994-12-16; Decree No. 204 of 1996
(Latvia)	Latvia	Autortiesību likums (2000-04-06)
(Lithuania)	Lithuania	Autorių teisių ir gretutinių teisių įstatimas N. VIII-1185 (1999-05-18)
(Luxembourg)	Luxembourg	Loi du 18 avril 2001, Mémorial A No. 50 du 30 avril 2001, p. 1042
(Malta)	Malta	Copyright Act, 2000
(Netherlands)	Netherlands	Wet van 21 December 1995, Stb. JS-1995, p. 653
(Poland)	Poland	unknown
(Portugal)	Portugal	Decreto-Lei n. 332/97, de 20 de Novembro de 1994
(Romania)	Romania	unknown
(Slovakia)	Slovakia	Copyright Act of 2003-12-04 (No. 618/1997 Zb.)
(Slovenia)	Slovenia	Zakon o avtorskih in sorodnih pravicah (1995-03-30)
(Spain)	Spain	Ley 43/1994, de 30 de diciembre, de incorporación al Derecho español de la Directiva 92/100/CEE, de 19 de noviembre, sobre derechos de alquiler y préstamo y otros derechos afines a los derechos de autor en el ámbito de la propiedad intelectual
(Sweden)	Sweden	Act 1997:309 of 1997-06-13
(United Kingdom)	United Kingdom	Public Lending Right Act 1979; Copyright and Related Rights Regulations 1996 No. 2967

== See also ==
- Copyright law of the European Union
- Bootleg recording
- Broadcast piracy
