= Database Directive =

CC-inspired CCJP

Directive 96/9/EC
- European Union directive
- Title: Directive on the legal protection of databases
- Made by: European Parliament & Council
- Made under: Arts. 47(2), 55 & 95
- Journal reference: L77, 1996-03-27, pp. 20–28

History
- Date made: 11 March 1996
- Entry into force: 27 March 1996
- Implementation date: 1 January 1998

Preparative texts
- Commission proposal: C156, 1992-06-23, p. 4 C308, 1993-11-15, p. 1
- EESC opinion: C19, 1993-01-25, p. 3
- EP opinion: C194, 1993-07-19, p. 144

The Directive 96/9/EC of the European Parliament and of the Council of 11 March 1996 on the legal protection of databases is a directive of the European Union in the field of copyright law, made under the internal market provisions of the Treaty of Rome. It harmonises the treatment of databases under copyright law and the sui generis right for the creators of databases which do not qualify for copyright.

As of 2022 the directive is being reviewed as part of a proposed Data Act. Public submissions closed on 25 June 2021, and a proposal for new harmonised rules on data was published on 23 February 2022.

== Definition of database ==
Article 1(2) defines a database as "a collection of independent works, data or other materials arranged in a systematic or methodical way and individually accessible by electronic or other means". Non-electronic databases are also covered (para. 14 of the preamble). Any computer program used to create the database is not included (para. 23 of the preamble). Copyright protection of software is governed by Directive 91/250/EEC.

== Copyright ==
Under Article 3, databases which, "by reason of the selection or arrangement of their contents, constitute the author's own intellectual creation" are protected by copyright as collections: no other criterion may be used by Member States. This follows from the 1994 Agreement on the Trade-Related Aspects of Intellectual Property Rights (TRIPS), a widely adopted treaty to which all World Trade Organization members are party. TRIPS clarifies and arguably relaxes the criterion for protection of collections in the Berne Convention for the Protection of Literary and Artistic Works, which covers "collections of literary and artistic works" and requires creativity in the "selection and arrangement" of the contents: in practice the difference is likely to be slight. Any copyright in the database is separate from and without prejudice to the copyright in the entries.

The acts restricted by copyright are similar to

- temporary or permanent reproduction by any means and in any form, in whole or in part;
- translation, adaptation, arrangement and any other alteration;
- any form of distribution to the public of the database or of copies thereof, subject to the exhaustion of rights;
- any communication, display or performance to the public;
- any reproduction, distribution, communication, display or performance to the public of a translation, adaptation, etc.

This shall not prevent the lawful use of the database by a lawful user [Art. 6(1)]: Member States may provide for any or all of the following limitations [Art. 6(2)], as well as applying any traditional limitations to copyright:

- reproduction for private purposes of a non-electronic database;
- use for the sole purpose of illustration for teaching or scientific research, as long as the source is indicated and to the extent justified by the non-commercial purpose to be achieved;
- use for the purposes of public security or for the purposes of an administrative or judicial procedure.

Copyright protection usually lasts for seventy years after the death of the last publicly identified author. Anonymous or pseudonymous works gain protection for the later of 70 years after the work is lawfully made available to the public or 70 years from creation. If national legislation makes particular provision for collective works or for a legal person (i.e. a body corporate) to be a rights holder the term of protection of calculated in the same way as for anonymous or pseudonymous works, with the exception that if any natural persons who created the work are given credit in versions made available to the public, the term of protection is calculated according to the lives of those authors. Art. 1, Directive 93/98/EEC).

== Notable litigation ==
=== British Horseracing Board ===
The British Horseracing Board (BHB) was the claimant in a notable case (C-203/02). At dispute was the re‑use of the contents of their horseracing information subscription service by other parties. The European Court of Justice (ECJ) ruled in 2004 that the resources used for the creation of materials which make up the contents of a database are not protected and BHB duly lost their litigation.

=== Apis-Hristovich EOOD v Lakorda AD ===
A preliminary court ruling (Case C-545/07) issued in 2009 in response to a Bulgarian court referral from the Sofiyski gradski sad (Sofia City Court). Apis and Lakorda both operated legal information databases. Lakorda had been set up by former Apis employees and Apis alleged that Lakorda had extracted data from two law information modules within its database. The ruling looked at the meaning of the terms "extraction", "permanent transfer" and "temporary transfer" in relation to data, and also established that any module within a database which could be defined as a database under the Directive should be treated as a database in itself.

=== CV‑Online Latvia case ===
An ECJ ruling (ECLI:EU:C:2021:434) in June 2021 markedly raised the threshold for infringement to occur: a claimant now needs to establish that an alleged "substantial extraction" also caused "significant detriment" to its investment in that database. The case itself (C‑762/19) concerned two Latvian companies providing job seeking services: CV‑Online Latvia and Melons. Husovec and Derclaye opine that the ECJ now "requires that all acts of extraction and re-utilization must lead to a risk that the database maker is not able to recoup its initial investment because of these actions [and that] while considering the risk, the national courts must balance the interests of other parties as part of the infringement test".
