= Cover version =

Later version of a song already established with an earlier performer

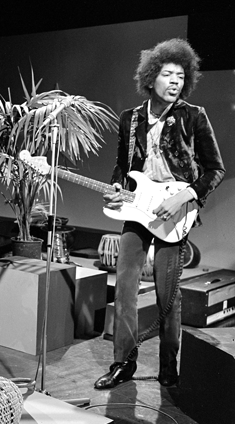
Jimi Hendrix's 1968 cover of "All Along the Watchtower" was more successful than Bob Dylan's 1967 original version

In popular music, a cover version, cover song, remake, revival, or simply cover is a new performance or recording by a musician other than the original performer or composer of the song. Originally, it referred to a version of a song released around the same time as the original in order to compete with it. Now, it refers to any subsequent version performed after the original.

== History ==
The term "cover" goes back decades when cover version originally described a rival version of a tune recorded to compete with the recently released (original) version. Examples of records covered include Paul Williams' 1949 hit tune "The Hucklebuck" and Hank Williams' 1952 song "Jambalaya". Both crossed over to the popular hit parade and had numerous hit versions. Before the mid-20th century, the notion of an original version of a popular tune would have seemed slightly odd – the production of musical entertainment was seen as a live event, even if it was reproduced at home via a copy of the sheet music, learned by heart or captured on a gramophone record. In fact, one of the principal objectives of publishing sheet music was to have a composition performed by as many artists as possible. This made the song more important than the performing artist and rival cover or 'copycat' versions would vie for success.

In previous generations, some artists made very successful careers of presenting revivals or reworkings of once-popular tunes, even out of doing contemporary cover versions of current hits. Since the 1950s, musicians now play what they call "cover versions" (the reworking, updating, or interpretation) of songs as a tribute to the original performer or group. Using familiar material (such as evergreen hits, standard tunes or classic recordings) is an important method of learning music styles. Until the mid-1960s most albums, or long playing records, contained a large number of evergreens or standards to present a fuller range of the artist's abilities and style. (See, for example, Please Please Me.) Artists might also perform interpretations ("covers") of a favorite artist's hit tunes for the simple pleasure of playing a familiar song or collection of tunes.

Today, three broad types of entertainers depend on cover versions for their principal repertoire:

- Tribute acts or bands are performers who make a living by recreating the music of one particular artist or band. Bands such as Björn Again, Led Zepagain, The Fab Four, Australian Pink Floyd Show and the Iron Maidens are dedicated to playing the music of ABBA, Led Zeppelin, The Beatles, Pink Floyd, and Iron Maiden respectively. Some tribute acts salute the Who, The Rolling Stones and many other classic rock acts. Many tribute acts target artists who remain popular but no longer perform, allowing an audience to experience the "next best thing" to the original act. The formation of tribute acts is roughly proportional to the enduring popularity of the original act; for example, dozens of Beatles tribute bands have formed and an entire subindustry has formed around Elvis impersonation. Many tribute bands attempt to recreate another band's music as faithfully as possible, but some such bands introduce a twist. Dread Zeppelin performs reggae versions of the Zeppelin catalog and Beatallica creates heavy metal fusions of songs by the Beatles and Metallica. There are also situations in which a member of a tribute band will go on to greater success, sometimes with the original act they tribute. One notable example is Tim "Ripper" Owens who, once the lead singer of Judas Priest tribute band British Steel, went on to join Judas Priest himself.
- Cover acts or bands are entertainers who perform a broad variety of crowd-pleasing cover songs for audiences who enjoy the familiarity of hit songs. Such bands draw from either current Top 40 hits or those of previous decades to provide nostalgic entertainment in bars, on cruise ships and at such events as weddings, family celebrations and corporate functions. Since the advent of inexpensive computers, some cover bands use a computerized catalog of songs, so that the singer can have the lyrics to a song displayed on a computer screen. The use of a screen for lyrics as a memory aid can dramatically increase the number of songs a singer can perform.
- Revivalist artists or bands are performers who are inspired by an entire genre of music and dedicate themselves to curating and recreating the genre and introducing it to younger audiences who have not experienced that music first hand. Unlike tribute bands and cover bands who rely primarily on audiences seeking a nostalgic experience, revivalist bands usually seek new young audiences for whom the music is fresh and has no nostalgic value. For example, Sha Na Na started in 1969 as a celebration of the doo-wop music of the 1950s, a genre of music that was not initially fashionable during the hippie counter-culture era. The Blues Brothers started in 1978 as a living salute to the blues, soul and R&B music of the 1950s and 1960s that was not in vogue by the late 1970s. The Blues Brothers' creed was that they were "on a mission from God" as evangelists for blues and soul music. The Black Crowes formed in 1984, initially dedicated to reviving 1970s style blues-rock. They started writing their own material in the same vein.

== United States copyright law ==
Since the Copyright Act of 1909, United States musicians have had the right to record a version of someone else's previously recorded and released tune, whether it is music alone or music with lyrics. A mechanical license can be negotiated between representatives of the interpreting artist and the copyright holder, or recording published tunes can fall under a compulsory license whereby the recording artist pays a standard royalty to the original author/copyright holder through an organization such as the Harry Fox Agency or Easy Song Licensing, and is safe under copyright law even if they do not have any permission from the original author. A similar service was provided by Limelight by RightsFlow, until January 2015, when they announced they will be closing their service. The U.S. Congress introduced the mechanical license to head off an attempt by the Aeolian Company to monopolize the piano roll market. In 2021, the Music Modernization Act established the Mechanical Licensing Collective (MLC) as the designated nonprofit entity to administer the blanket compulsory licensing on digital platforms.

Although a composer cannot deny anyone a mechanical license for a new recorded version, the composer has the right to decide who will release the first recording of a song. Bob Dylan took advantage of this right when he refused his own record company the right to release a live recording of "Mr. Tambourine Man". Even with this, pre-release cover versions of songs can occasionally occur.

Live performances of copyrighted songs are typically arranged through performing rights organizations such as ASCAP or BMI.

== Early 20th-century history ==
=== Multiple versions in various formats or locations ===
Early in the 20th century it became common for phonograph record labels to have singers or musicians "cover" a commercially successful "hit" tune by recording a version for their own label in hopes of cashing in on the tune's success. For example, Ain't She Sweet was popularized in 1927 by Eddie Cantor (on stage) and by Ben Bernie and Gene Austin (on record), was repopularized through popular recordings by Mr. Goon Bones & Mr. Ford and Pearl Bailey in 1949, and later still revived as 33 1/3 and 45 RPM records by the Beatles in 1964.

Because little promotion or advertising was done in the early days of record production, other than at the local music hall or music store, the average buyer purchasing a new record usually asked for the tune, not the artist. Record distribution was highly localized, so a locally popular artist could quickly record a version of a hit song from another area and reach an audience before the version by the artist(s) who first introduced the tune, and highly competitive record companies were quick to take advantage of this.

=== Rival outlets and popularized recordings ===
This began to change in the late 1930s, when the growing record-buying public began including a younger age group. During the swing era, when a bobby soxer went looking for a recorded tune, say "In the Mood", typically she wanted the version popularized by her favorite artist(s), e.g. the Glenn Miller version (on RCA Victor's cheaper Bluebird label), not someone else's (sometimes presented on a more expensive record company's label). This trend was marked closely by the charting of record sales by the different artists, not just hit tunes, on the music industry's hit parades. However, for sound commercial reasons, record companies still continued to record different versions of tunes that sold well. Most audiences until the mid-1950s still heard their favorite artists playing live music on stage or via the radio. And since radio shows were for the most part aimed at local audiences, it was still rare for an artist in one area to reach a mass audience. Also radio stations tended to cater to broad audience markets, so an artist in one vein might not get broadcast on other stations geared to a set audience. So popular versions of jazz, country and western or rhythm and blues tunes, and vice versa, were frequent. An example is "Mack the Knife" ("Die Moritat von Mackie Messer"), originally from Bertolt Brecht's 1928 Die Dreigroschenoper. It was popularized by a 1956 hit parade instrumental tune, "Moritat", for the Dick Hyman Trio, also recorded by Richard Hayman & Jan August, but a hit also for Louis Armstrong 1956/1959, Bobby Darin, 1959, and Ella Fitzgerald, 1960, as vocal versions of "Mack the Knife".

Europe's Radio Luxembourg, like many commercial stations, also sold "air time"; so record companies and others bought air time to promote their own artists or products, thus increasing the number of recorded versions of any tune then available. Add to this the fact that many radio stations were limited in their permitted "needle time" (the amount of recorded music they were allowed to play), or were regulated on the amount of local talent they had to promote in live broadcasts, as with most national stations like the BBC in the UK.

=== Incentives to make duplicate recorded versions of a song ===
In the US, broadcasters pay royalties to authors and publishers. Artists are not paid royalties, so there is an incentive to record numerous versions of a song, particularly in different genres. For example, King Records frequently cut both rhythm and blues and country and western versions of novelty songs like "Good Morning, Judge" and "Don't Roll those Bloodshot Eyes at Me". This tradition was expanded when rhythm and blues songs began appearing on pop music charts.

In the early days of rock and roll, many tunes originally recorded by R&B and country musicians were still being re-recorded in a more popular vein by other artists with a more toned-down style or professional polish. This was inevitable because radio stations were reluctant to play formats outside their target audience's taste. By far the most popular style of music in the mid-1950s / mid-1960s was still the professional light orchestra, therefore popular recording artists sought that format. For many purists these popular versions lacked the raw earthiness of the original introducing artists.

Most did not have the kudos that rebellious teenagers craved, the street credibility — of rock and roll music; most were performed, and some were written, by black artists not heard in popular mass entertainment markets. Most parents considered the bowdlerized popular cover versions more palatable for the mass audience of parents and their children. Artists targeting the white-majority family audience were more acceptable to programmers at most radio and TV stations. Singer-songwriter Don McLean called the cover version a "racist tool". Many parents in the 1950s - 60s, whether intentionally racist or not, felt deeply threatened by the rapid pace of social change. They had, for the most part, shared entertainment with their parents in ways their children had become reluctant to do. The jukebox and the personal record disc player were still relatively expensive pieces of machinery — and the portable radio a great novelty, allowing truculent teenagers to shut themselves off.

Tunes by introducing or "original" niche market artists that became successful on the mass audience hit parade charts are called crossovers as they "crossed over" from the targeted country, jazz or rhythm audience. Also, many songs originally recorded by male artists were rerecorded by female artists, and vice versa. Such a cover version is also sometimes called a cross cover version, male cover, or female cover. Some songs such as "If Only for One Night" were originally recorded by female artists but covered by mostly male artists.

Reworking non-English language tunes and lyrics for the Anglo-Saxon markets was once a popular part of the music business. For example, the 1954 worldwide hit "The Happy Wanderer" was originally "Der fröhliche Wanderer", to this must be added "Hymne à l'amour", "Mütterlein", "Volare", "Seeman", "Quando, Quando, Quando", "L'amour est bleu", etc.

== Modern cover versions of songs ==
Cover versions of many popular songs have been recorded, sometimes with a radically different style, sometimes virtually unrecognizable from the original. For example, Sir Mix-a-Lot's 1992 rap "Baby Got Back" was covered by indie rock singer Jonathan Coulton in 2005, in an acoustic soft rock style. Coulton's cover was then covered, without attribution, in 2013 by the show Glee, and was so similar that Coulton, among others, alleged plagiarism of his arrangement and melody. Some producers or recording artists may also enlist the services of a sample replay company such as Titan Tribute Media or Scorccio, in order to replicate an original recording with precision detail and accuracy.

A song may be covered into another language. For example, in the 1930s, a recording of "Isle of Capri" in Spanish, by Osvaldo Fresedo and singer Roberto Ray, is known. Falco's 1982 German-language hit "Der Kommissar" was covered in English by After the Fire, although the German title was retained. The English version, which was not a direct translation of Falco's original but retained much of its spirit, reached the Top 5 on the US charts. "The Lion Sleeps Tonight" evolved over several decades and versions from a 1939 Solomon Linda a cappella song. Many of singer Laura Branigan's 1980s hits were English-language covers of songs already successful in Europe, for the American record market. Numerable English-language covers exist of "99 Luftballons" by German singer Nena (notably one by punk band Goldfinger), one having been recorded by Nena herself following the success of her original German version. "Popcorn", a song that was originally completely instrumental, has had lyrics added in at least six different languages in various covers. During the heyday of Cantopop in Hong Kong in the late 1970s to early 1990s, many hits were covers of English and Japanese titles that have gained international fame but with localized lyrics (sometimes multiple sets of lyrics sung to the same tune), and critics often chide the music industry of shorting the tune-composing process.

Although modern cover versions are often produced for artistic reasons, some aspects of the disingenuous spirit of early cover versions remain. In the album-buying heyday of the 1970s, albums of sound-alike covers were created, commonly released to fill bargain bins in the music section of supermarkets and even specialized music stores, where uninformed customers might easily confuse them with original recordings. The packaging of such discs was often intentionally confusing, combining the name of the original artist in large letters with a tiny disclaimer like as originally sung by or as made popular by. More recently, albums such as the Kidz Bop series of compact discs, featuring versions of contemporary songs sung by children, have sold successfully.

In 2009, the American musical comedy-drama television series Glee debuted, featuring several musical performances per episode. The series featured solely cover songs performed by the series' titular glee club until near the end of its second season with the episode "Original Song". The series still primarily uses cover songs of both chart hits and show tunes, occasionally as mashups or distinct variations. The show's musical performances have been a commercial success, with over twenty-one million copies of Glee cast single releases purchased digitally, and over nine million albums purchased worldwide.

Australian alternative/indie radio station Triple J presents a weekly segment called Like a Version in which a band or musician performs one of their own songs as well as a song they love by another artist. Originating in 2004, the popularity of the performances have resulted in the release of annual compilation albums of selected covers and, more recently, votes in the annual Triple J Hottest 100 poll (which has even sparked its own controversy).

Conjoined cover songs are collectively referred to as a cover medley.

On occasion, a cover can become more popular than the original, for instance Jimi Hendrix’s version of Bob Dylan’s "All Along the Watchtower" became the standard, and Dylan even adjusted his performance style closer to the Hendrix version. Johnny Cash’s 2002 cover of "Hurt" by Nine Inch Nails is another example of the cover version eclipsing the original. This is a widespread, common occurrence in the music industry.

With advancements in artificial intelligence, internet users can create covers using RVC models.

== Updating older songs ==
Cover versions (as the term is now used) are often contemporary versions of familiar songs. For example, "Singin' in the Rain" was originally introduced by Cliff Edwards in the film The Hollywood Revue of 1929. The famous Gene Kelly version was a revision that brought it up to date for a 1950s Hollywood musical, and was used in the 1952 film Singin' in the Rain. In 1978, it was covered by French singer Sheila, accompanied by the B. Devotion group, as a disco song, once more updating it to suit the musical taste of the era. During the disco era there was a trend of taking well known songs and recording them in the disco style. More recently "Singin' in the Rain" has been covered and remixed by British act Mint Royale for a television commercial for Volkswagen. Another example of this, from a different angle, is the tune "Blueberry Hill", many mistakenly believe the Fats Domino 1956 release to be the original recording and artist. In fact, it was originally introduced on film by Gene Autry and popularized on the record Hit Parade of 1940 by Glenn Miller. The Fats Domino rock and roll version is the only one that might currently get widespread airplay on most media. Similarly, "Unchained Melody" was originally performed by Todd Duncan, featured in the 1955 film Unchained (based on the non-fiction story Prisoners are People by Kenyon J. Scudder); Al Hibbler having the biggest number of worldwide record sales for the vocal version with Jimmy Young's cover version rival outdoing this in the UK, Les Baxter's Orchestra gaining the big instrumentalist sales, reaching the US Hit Parade number one spot in May 1955, but the Righteous Brothers' later version (top five on the US Hit Parade of September 1965 stalling at number 14 in the UK in August) is by far the wider known version, and especially so following its appearance in the 1990 film Ghost. "House of the Rising Sun" has hundreds of versions and in many genres such as folk, blues rock and punk as well as dance and dubstep.

Director Baz Luhrmann has contemporized and stylized older songs for use in his films. New or cover versions such as John Paul Young's "Love Is in the Air" occur in Strictly Ballroom, Candi Staton's "Young Hearts Run Free" appear in Romeo + Juliet, and adaptations of artists such as Nat King Cole, Nirvana, Kiss, Elton John, Thelma Houston, Marilyn Monroe, Madonna, T. Rex, David Bowie, Queen, and the Police are used in Moulin Rouge!. The covers are carefully designed to fit into the structure of each film and suit the taste of the intended audience.

Other artists release new versions of their own songs, like German singer Nena who recorded an entire album with great success, with new versions of older hits. Cover songs can be used to display creativity of a performers work through the talent of another artist's previous production. Not to be confused with a remix, which is defined as altering or distorting the original sound electronically; cover versions give a performer the ability to adapt music to their own style, typically allowing them to change the genre of a song and recreating it to their own taste. For example, in 2008, Fall Out Boy covered Michael Jackson's hit song "Beat It", changing the genre from pop rock to a more punk rock feel. Another example is when My Chemical Romance covered the Bob Dylan track "Desolation Row". This is more common with today's covers, taking older popular music and revamping it to compare with modern popular music. Aretha Franklin's cover of Otis Redding's "Respect" was voted the greatest cover song of all time, according to Forbes.com.

== See also ==
- List of cover albums
- List of cover bands and artists
- Lists of cover songs
- Compilation album
- Compulsory license
- Contrafactum
- Dance cover
- WhoSampled
- Interpolation
- Mashup
- Medley
- Parody music
- Remix
- Reprise
- Sampling
- Track-for-track cover album
- Tribute act
- Remake
- Traditional pop
- Jazz standard
- List of blues standards
- Synchronization rights, licensing use of a song combined with other media
