= Mechanical license =

License from the holder of a copyright of a composition or musical work

In copyright law, a mechanical license is a license from the holder of a copyright of a composition or musical work, to another party to create a "cover song", reproduce, or sample a portion of the original composition. It applies to copyrighted work that is neither a free/open source item nor in the public domain.

== Concept ==
Most modern music consists of two distinct copyright elements. One is the composition itself, which consists of both the musical composition and the lyrics, each which may have separate copyrights. The second is the sound recording, which covers both tangible copies ("phonorecord") of the performance of the work (such as vinyl albums, cassette tapes, CDs, and digital formats like MP3s) and public performances of the recording (such as over the radio). The copyright between the composition and the sound recording is frequently held by different parties.

A mechanical license is a license provided by the holder of the copyright of the composition or musical work to another party to cover, reproduce, or sample specific parts of the original composition. In United States copyright law, such mechanical licenses are compulsory; any party may obtain a license without permission of the license holder by paying a set license fee, that as of 2018, was set at 12.7 cents per composition or 2.45 cents per minute of composition, whichever is more, which are to go to the composition copyright holder. These fees are paid to agencies like the Harry Fox Agency, who either already represent the composition copyright holders, or are able to direct the funds to the right party. Mechanical licenses do not apply to any sound recordings of the composition, and instead a separate non-mechanical license must be sought from the copyright holder of the sound recording (typically the musical performer or their agency representing them).

For example: a producer wants to sample the opening riff from "Every Breath You Take" by The Police. They contact the copyright holder of the underlying musical work and get a mechanical license to use all or part of The Police's song in their composition. They now have the right to reproduce all or part of "Every Breath You Take" in their new song. They cannot, however, purchase The Police's Greatest Hits, take the CD (or MP3 from iTunes) into the studio, pull the track off of the phonorecord, and sample the riff into their new song. For the producer to sample from The Police's sound recording, they must get both a mechanical license from the copyright holder of the underlying musical work and a license from the copyright holder of the sound recording from which they copy the sample. They are free to hire musicians to reproduce The Police's sound, but they cannot copy from any sound recording with only a mechanical license.

A mechanical license can only be used after the original copyright holder has exercised their exclusive right of first publishing, or permission is negotiated.

In American law, US Code Title 17, Chapter 1, Section 115(a)(2) states: "A compulsory license includes the privilege of making a musical arrangement of the work to the extent necessary to conform it to the style or manner of interpretation of the performance involved, but the arrangement shall not change the basic melody or fundamental character of the work ..." thus preventing mechanical licenses being used to make substantially derivative works of a piece of music.

Musicians often use this license for self-promotion. For instance, a cellist who performed a musical work on a recording may obtain a mechanical license so he can distribute copies of the recording to others as an example of his cello playing. Recording artists also use this when they record cover versions of songs. This is common among artists who don't usually write their own songs. In the United States, this is required by copyright law regardless whether or not the copies are for commercial sale. The musician must serve the copyright owner a Notice of Intent (NOI) to obtain a compulsory license to distribute non-digital media of the recording.

A mechanical license is not required for artists who record and distribute completely original work. In terms of digital streaming, a mechanical license is only required for "interactive streams." An interactive stream occurs on a service that permits a listener to choose a particular song and those that create a personalized program for the listener. While a non-interactive service requires a performing right license it does not require a mechanical license.

== History ==
The idea of mechanical licenses came about shortly after the turn of the 20th century, with the popularity of player pianos, with the ability to play songs encoded on a roll of paper. The sheet music industry then believed that the recreation of their songs was violation of copyright, and initiated legal action that resulted in the Supreme Court of the United States case, White-Smith Music Publishing Co. v. Apollo Co. (209 U.S. 1) in 1908. The Supreme Court ruled that the piano rolls were not copies of the plaintiff's music, but instead part of the machine that created music, and thus player piano and piano roll makers did not have to pay royalties to the sheet music composers. Songwriters lobbied to the United States Congress following the ruling, and succeeded in establishing the nature of mechanical licenses in the Copyright Act of 1909.

Since then, the nature of copyright law with respect to mechanical licenses have been continually updated to include new types of phonorecords mediums and recordings. For example, in October 2006 the Register of Copyright ruled that ring tones are subject to compulsory licensing. The Music Modernization Act passed in 2018 implemented processes for digital streaming services to pay for the compulsory mechanical license through a new non-profit organization created by the law, known as the Mechanical Licensing Collective (MLC). The Music Modernization Act changes the process of filing Notices of Intent (NOI) to obtain a compulsory license. Whereas a potential licensee intending to make digital reproductions of the work could previously submit a NOI to the copyright office when the name and/or address of the copyright owner could not be found, under the new law, the Copyright Office no longer accepts notices of intention to obtain a mechanical license for digital phonorecord deliveries of a work. The Office continues to accept notices of intention for non-digital phonorecord deliveries (e.g., for CDs, vinyl records, tapes, and other physical media).

== See also ==
- Copyright
- Compulsory license
- Section 115 Reform Act of 2006
