= Sound recording copyright =

Exclusive rights in sound recordings

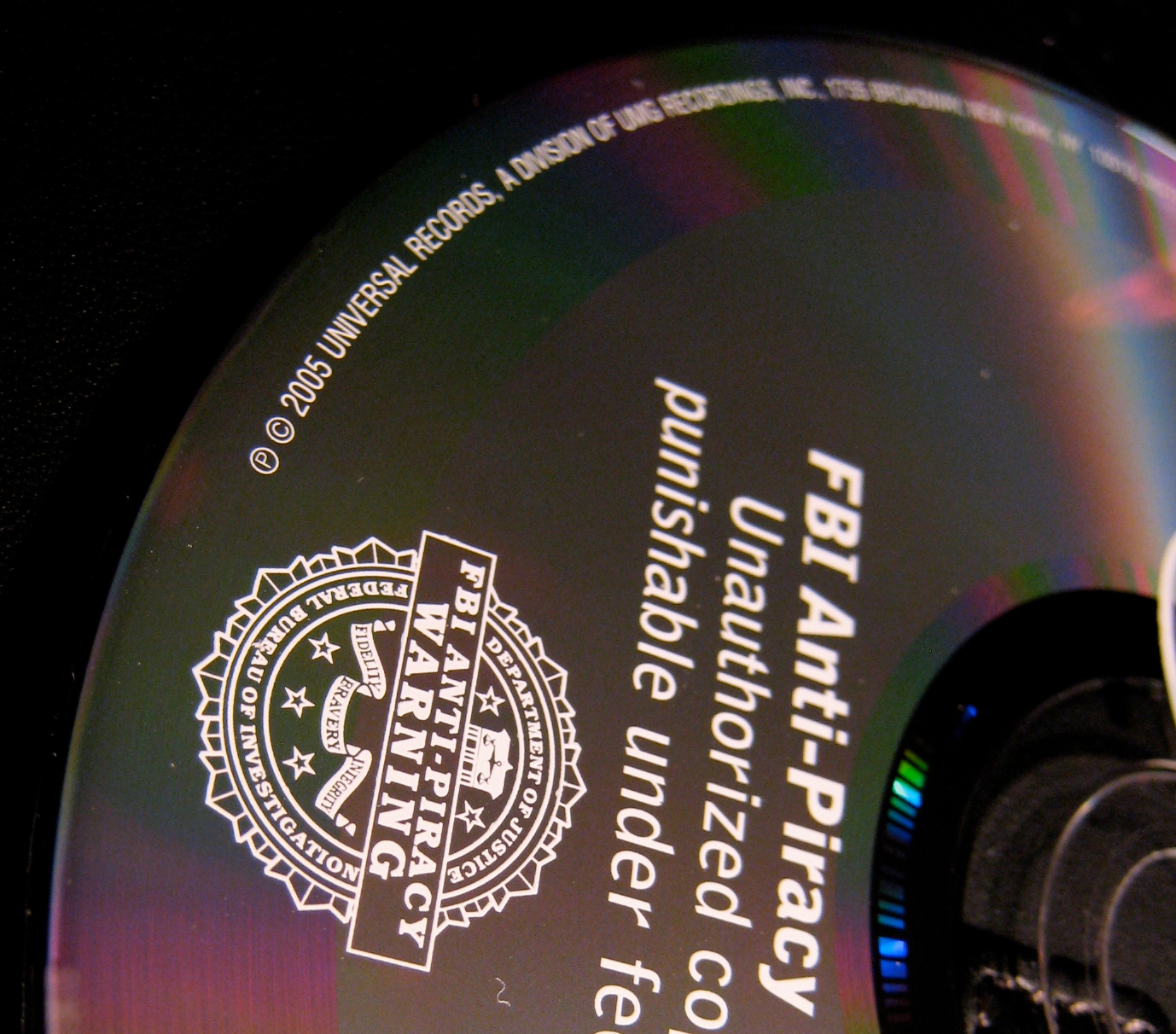
A compact disc displaying the standard copyright symbol (©) and the sound recording copyright symbol (℗)

A sound recording copyright is the copyright in a recorded fixation of sounds, as distinct from the underlying musical, literary (text-based), or dramatic work embodied in the recording. This type of copyright is often represented by the sound recording copyright symbol, ℗ (letter P in a circle).

The Geneva Phonograms Convention (1971) provides the international legal authority for countries to bring sound recordings (which it refers to as phonograms) under national copyright and related rights frameworks. Many common law countries, including the United States and United Kingdom, protect sound recordings under their traditional copyright regimes. Other countries provide protection to performers and producers of phonograms under systems of dedicated neighboring rights.

Copyrightable sound recordings include recorded music, radio programs, audiobooks, recordings of telephone calls, and podcasts. In the music industry, the sound recording copyright, also known as the master recording or master rights, is often owned by a separate entity (such as a record label or recording artist) than the musical composition, which is owned by one or more songwriters or publishers.

== Terminology ==
=== Sound recording ===
"Fig Leaf Rag"
An audio file of "Fig Leaf Rag" by Scott Joplin (1908), as performed by Kevin MacLeod. This sound recording has a separate copyright status from the musical composition, which is in the public domain.

Generally, a sound recording is a recording (or fixation) of a sequence of sounds, whether produced by the human voice, musical instruments, or other sources. In practice, many sound recordings embody a vocal or musical performance by a recording artist, and are treated as separate works from the musical, literary, or dramatic works being performed. However, not all sound recordings consist of performances of other works. (Note: Copyright Act (Canada), R.S.C., 1985, c. C-42, s. 2: "sound recording means a recording, fixed in any material form, consisting of sounds, whether or not of a performance of a work, but excludes any soundtrack of a cinematographic work where it accompanies the cinematographic work.") For example, a field recording of bird songs lacks a human performer but is still considered a sound recording.

The concept of a sound recording is defined differently in the copyright laws of individual countries. For example, under United States and Canadian law, the sounds accompanying motion pictures and other audiovisual works (cinematographic works in Canada) are excluded from the definition of sound recordings. (Note: 17 U.S.C. § 101: "'Sound recordings' are works that result from the fixation of a series of musical, spoken, or other sounds, but not including the sounds accompanying a motion picture or other audiovisual work, regardless of the nature of the material objects, such as disks, tapes, or other phonorecords, in which they are embodied.") U.S. law further distinguishes sound recordings from phonorecords, the material objects (including digital files) in which they can be embodied. Both the underlying literary, dramatic, or musical work and the sound recording are works that can be fixed on a phonorecord.

=== Phonogram ===
The term phonogram is used instead of sound recording in international agreements and by many countries besides the U.S. Under the Rome Convention, first signed in 1961, a phonogram is defined as "any exclusively aural fixation of sounds of a performance or of other sounds". Identical wording is used in the 1971 Geneva Phonograms Convention. In the WIPO Performances and Phonograms Treaty (1996), a phonogram is defined as "the fixation of the sounds of a performance or of other sounds, or of a representation of sounds, other than in the form of a fixation incorporated in a cinematographic or other audiovisual work".

Phonogram is also used in European Union copyright directives and in the official English translations of national laws such as those of Japan and South Korea.

=== Copyright versus neighboring rights ===
Jurisdictions differ as to whether they categorize protections for performers' and producers' rights in phonograms as "copyright" or "neighboring rights" (also known as related rights). United States copyright law treats sound recordings as copyrightable subject matter, "clearly within the scope of the 'writings of an author' capable of protection under the Constitution". A sound recording copyright vests in performers, producers, or both, who contribute original authorship. Similarly, Canadian law recognizes "copyrights" in both performances (whether fixed in sound recordings or unfixed) and sound recordings themselves.

By contrast, many other countries treat the rights of performers and phonogram producers as neighboring rights, particularly in Europe. Philosophically, these rights were historically viewed as "lesser, economic right[s] more akin to industrial property" rights such as design rights and database rights, as they are based on the investment of labor and capital needed to produce a phonogram rather than the personality rights of an author. Furthermore, performances are not subject to any threshold of originality for protection of the performers' neighboring rights, and the act of performing pre-existing material is perceived as less risky than creating new works of authorship. European Union copyright directives such as Directive 2011/77/EU categorize performers' and phonogram producers' rights as "related rights". However, the European Commission has referred to these rights as "copyright" in some of its public communications.

== History ==
When the phonograph was invented in the 19th century, sound recordings were not protected by copyright law. Phonograph manufacturers in the United States sold cylinders and disks with pre-recorded performances of songs, speeches, and stories to promote the technical capabilities of their devices. In the absence of copyright protection, competitors often made and sold copies of these recordings without the authorization of the record companies that had produced them, a practice that drew criticism from recording artists such as Russell Hunting.

When Congress passed the Copyright Act of 1909, it expanded the scope of copyright in musical works to cover mechanical reproductions, including piano rolls and phonograph records, but introduced a compulsory license whereby any record or music roll manufacturer could create their own mechanical reproductions of a copyrighted musical composition for a flat rate. However, the Act did not grant copyright protection to sound recordings themselves.

=== Introduction of sound recording copyright ===
The British Copyright Act 1911 extended copyright protection to sound recordings for the first time.

In the 1960s, U.S. states began to pass laws criminalizing the unauthorized duplication and sale of sound recordings. New York became the first state to pass an anti-record piracy statute in 1967; California followed suit in 1968. Congress passed the Sound Recording Amendment on November 15, 1971, bringing sound recordings under federal copyright protection for the first time. The law came into effect on February 15, 1972, and protected sound recordings created on or after that date. Under this law, copyright owners have had an exclusive right to reproduce, distribute, and prepare derivative works based on a sound recording; however, the rights of reproduction and derivative works are circumscribed to cases involving the duplication of the actual sounds in the recording. The law did not introduce any exclusive right to public performance of sound recordings. Sound recordings fixed before February 15, 1972, remained subject to state-level protection rather than federal copyright law.

=== Subsequent developments ===
As part of the Uruguay Round Agreements Act of 1994, the United States "restored" copyright protection to certain foreign works that were still under copyright in their country of origin but were in the public domain in the United States. These works included sound recordings first fixed before February 15, 1972, as they had never been subject to federal copyright protection. Most restored works gained copyright protection on January 1, 1996, provided that they were still copyrighted in their home country on that date. (Note: 17 U.S.C. § 104A(h)(6)(C)(ii): "The term 'restored work' means an original work of authorship that... is in the public domain in the United States due to... lack of subject matter protection in the case of sound recordings fixed before February 15, 1972.")

Congress passed the Digital Performance Right in Sound Recordings Act in 1995, which extended copyright protection for sound recordings to public performances "by means of a digital audio transmission". The act also provided for a statutory license for non-interactive streaming services that transmit copyrighted sound recordings, such as Pandora and SiriusXM.

An amendment adding sound recordings to the list of categories that could qualify as works made for hire under the "specially ordered or commissioned" prong of the work for hire definition (17 U.S.C. § 101) was passed by Congress in November 1999. This would allow record labels to own sound recordings outright for the entire copyright term, without any possibility for the artists or producers to reclaim their rights after 35 years, as with a normal copyright transfer. Recording artists criticized the amendment, as it would reduce their leverage in their dealings with record companies, and alleged that it was inserted into a bill without giving stakeholders a chance to debate it. But record companies argued that it was a technical amendment that merely clarified how existing law applied to industry practice, since the majority of sound recordings would have already qualified as contributions to collective works (i.e. albums). The amendment was repealed in 2000 with the support of both recording artists and record labels.

The Performance Rights Act was introduced into the 110th United States Congress in 2007; the bill would have extended the public performance right in sound recordings to cover any audio transmission, over-the-air or digital. The bill was supported by MusicFIRST, a coalition of recording artists and record labels, and opposed by the National Association of Broadcasters. It was also supported by Marybeth Peters, then Register of Copyrights, when it was reintroduced in 2009. Similar bills have been introduced in subsequent meetings of Congress. Another bill, the Supporting the Local Radio Freedom Act (LRFA), is a concurrent resolution stating that Congress should not extend public performance rights to over-the-air broadcasting of sound recordings; it has been introduced in every Congress since 2007.

The European Parliament passed Directive 2011/77/EU in 2009, extending the term of protection for performers' and producers' rights in sound recordings. The term of protection was kept at 50 years from the creation of the phonogram if it is not published or communicated to the public. If the phonogram is lawfully published or communicated to the public during that 50-year term, it remains protected for 70 years (previously 50) from such publication or communication to the public. The directive was subsequently passed by the Council of the European Union in 2011.

The United States Congress passed the Music Modernization Act in 2018; Title II, the CLASSICS Act, extended federal protection to sound recordings made before February 15, 1972, preempting state- and local-level copyright claims. The first cohort of sound recordings, those published before 1923, entered the public domain on January 1, 2022. All other pre-1972 recordings will enter the public domain by February 15, 2067.

On June 17, 2026, the National Diet of Japan passed a bill extending neighboring rights in sound recordings, held by performers and phonogram producers, to performances in public venues. Under Japanese law, performers and record producers were already entitled to compensation for broadcasts of their sound recordings but not for in-person public performances. The reform will come into effect within three years of its enactment into law, and it will enable Japanese performers and record producers to earn royalties for public performances in other countries that enforce reciprocal recognition of neighboring rights.

== Authorship and ownership ==
As with any other copyrightable work, the initial owner of copyright in a sound recording is generally its author or authors, unless it is created by an employee in the course of their employment. Authorship of a sound recording is determined differently by the laws of different countries. The United States Copyright Office recognizes two types of sound recording authorship: in the performance and in the production of the sound recording. Performance authorship includes playing an instrument, singing, speaking, or creating other sounds that are captured and fixed in the sound recording. On the other hand, production authorship can include capturing, editing, and arranging the sounds fixed in the recording. Both performance and production authorship are treated as joint contributions to a unitary work. By contrast, under UK law, the record producer is considered the sole author and first owner of copyright in a sound recording, but performers are entitled to a separate set of related rights to control the use of their sound recordings.

A typical commercially produced sound recording can have multiple co-creators, including featured artists, session musicians, producers, and audio engineers. For sound recordings with large numbers of contributors, this can create uncertainty as to whether a record label that has acquired the copyright will always retain ownership of the work, as a single co-author can terminate their grant of rights under U.S. law and block commercial exploitation of the sound recording. Many record companies require agreements purporting to make these contributions works made for hire, ensuring that the record company enjoys exclusive distribution rights.

== Exclusive rights ==
A number of international treaties provide for the protection of the economic rights of phonogram producers, as well as the economic and moral rights of performers in sound recordings of their performances:

- Rome Convention for the Protection of Performers, Producers of Phonograms and Broadcasting Organisations (1961)
- Geneva Phonograms Convention (1971)
- WIPO Performances and Phonograms Treaty (1996)

While these treaties are not considered "copyright treaties" per se, the Geneva Phonograms Convention authorizes contracting countries to implement protection of phonogram producers' rights in the form of copyright or other specific rights, via the law of unfair competition, or via penal sanctions. The implementation is left up to each country.

=== United States ===
United States copyright law provides the copyright owner of a sound recording with the exclusive rights of reproduction, distribution, and creation of derivative works. However, the exclusive right of reproduction "is limited to the right to duplicate the sound recording in the form of phonorecords or copies that directly or indirectly recapture the actual sounds fixed in the recording". Likewise, the derivative work right is limited to derivative works "in which the actual sounds fixed in the sound recording are rearranged, remixed, or otherwise altered in sequence or quality".

Sampling involves using part of an existing sound recording in a new recording, and it generally requires permission from the copyright owner of the recording (usually a record label) as well as the owner of the underlying musical composition (usually a music publisher). It is distinguished from interpolation, which involves re-recording a melody from a prior composition and only requires permission from the owner of the composition. Lawsuits over the unlicensed use of samples are common, especially in hip-hop.

The rights of reproduction and adaptation of a sound recording do not extend to the creation of any new recording "that consists entirely of an independent fixation of other sounds", even if they "imitate or simulate" the sounds in the original recording. Thus, any two sound recordings of the same underlying work have separate copyrights, even if they embody performances by the same artist. This exception allowed Taylor Swift to create re-recordings of her songs during a high-profile dispute with her former record label, even though the label owned the copyrights to her original recordings. However, many recording contracts with record labels include restrictive covenants prohibiting artists from re-recording music for a period of time, sometimes 10 to 30 years after the contract is terminated.

The United States also provides for an exclusive right to perform a sound recording publicly "by means of a digital audio transmission", but not a general public performance right. Thus, over-the-air radio stations must obtain a license from performing rights organizations (PROs) to broadcast copyrighted musical compositions, but are generally exempt from paying royalties to the owners of sound recordings. By contrast, online streaming services, whether interactive or noninteractive, must obtain a license from the owners of sound recordings as well as musical compositions. However, this license is compulsory in the case of noninteractive digital streaming services "where the user cannot select particular sound recordings to be played to them on demand". Additionally, ephemeral copies of a sound recording can made to facilitate over-the-air broadcasts (which are exempt from the public performance right) and licensed noninteractive streams. These "ephemeral recordings" are allowed under a statutory license and in some cases are exempt from the sound recording copyright.

=== United Kingdom ===
Under the copyright law of the United Kingdom, the author and first owner of copyright in a sound recording is the record producer. However, performers have a parallel set of related rights in their performances, including performances captured in sound recordings.

The author of a copyright work has both economic rights and moral rights in the work. Economic rights include the exclusive rights of reproduction, adaptation, distribution, rental and lending, public performance (including playing sound recordings in public), and communication to the public via broadcasting or the Internet. Moral rights are not available to the producer of a sound recording, however.

Performers' rights include the right to authorize a recording or broadcast of their performance, as well as the right to copy, distribute, rent, or lend copies of the recording to the public, or to make the recording available on the Internet. These rights can be transferred to the producer of a sound recording in exchange for royalties. Performers also have moral rights in their performances, which include the right to be identified as the performer and the right to object to derogatory treatment of the performance.

As of November 2013, performers' rights in sound recordings last for 70 years after the recording is released to the public. Unreleased performances have a protection term of 50 years since their creation. If a recording of the performance is released during that 50-year period, then the 70-year term applies from the date of release.

=== Canada ===
Part II of the Canadian Copyright Act deals with copyright and moral rights in performers' performances, sound recordings, and communication signals. Performers have both copyright and moral rights in their performances, while the makers of sound recordings have copyright in their sound recordings.

== Duration ==
In the United States, the copyright term for sound recordings is the same as the standard copyright term for other works: life of the author plus 70 years, or 95 years for a work made for hire or a pseudonymous or anonymous work. Some pre-1972 sound recordings protected under the CLASSICS Act have terms of protection of 100 or 110 years. In most other countries, the term of protection for sound recordings is shorter than the standard copyright term.

The minimum term of protection for sound recordings has been established in several international treaties:

- Universal Copyright Convention (1952): 25 years
- Rome Convention (1961): 20 years
- TRIPS Agreement (1995): 50 years
- WIPO Performances and Phonograms Treaty (1996): 50 years

The disparity between the durations of phonogram protection in the United States and the European Union was one reason cited for extending the term of protection in the EU to match that of the U.S. The UK Parliament Select Committee on Culture, Media and Sport recommended that the copyright term for sound recordings in the EU be extended to at least 70 years. The European Commission initially proposed an extension from 50 years to 95 years for rights in sound recordings, but this was reduced to 70 years in the enacted version of Directive 2011/77/EU.

In Australia, the copyright term for sound recordings was extended from 50 years to 70 years in 2005 due to the Australia–United States Free Trade Agreement.
