= Permissions =

Permissions may refer to:

== Law ==
- A license in copyright law, such as
  - Music licensing, including performing rights for public performances, grand rights for theatrical performances, and sync licenses for audiovisual works

== Technology ==
- Application permissions
- File system permissions
