= Blokur =

Music rights and data platform

- Website type: Music rights
- Founded: 2017
- Headquarters: London, England
- Area served: Worldwide
- Founder: Phil Barry
- Parent: Music Reports
- Website: blokur.com
- Commercial: Yes
- Launched: 2017
- Current status: Active

Blokur is a music rights and data platform based in London that provides global music reporting and licensing for digital products and services. The company is an official partner of the Mechanical Licensing Collective (MLC).

In 2024, Blokur was acquired by American music rights company Music Reports.

== Overview ==
Blokur was founded in 2017 by Phil Barry, a former recording artist who was inspired to build a platform that would help address the issue of artists not being paid effectively. The platform uses data engineering and subgraph matching technology to link song recordings with their underlying compositions. That tackles issues related to the misrepresentation of song data, difficulties in reporting music use, and the identification of music licensing coverage.

Blokur released a 2020 Songwriters' Review, a report that calculates the best-performing global songwriters based on their shares in the top-streamed songs. Tones and I topped the chart as the sole writer of her hit song "Dance Monkey". The second installment of the report, the 2021 Songwriters' Review, was sponsored by The Ivors Academy. That year, Olivia Rodrigo was named the top songwriter following the commercial success of her album Sour.

== Company ==
Blokur has partnerships with audio delivery companies 7digital and Tuned Global. The company's funders include Innovate UK and Ascension. In 2022, the company began building the copyright hub for IMPEL Collective Management Limited.

On 6 December 2023, The MLC announced its Supplemental Matching Network, which initially consists of five companies (including Blokur) that provide data matching services to complement and enhance The MLC’s existing matching processes.
