= Computer Programs Directive =

EU copyright directive

Directive 91/250/EEC 2009/24/EC
- European Union directive
- Title: Directive on the legal protection of computer programs
- Made by: Council of the European Union
- Made under: Art. 100a
- Journal reference: L122, 1991-05-17, pp. 9–13

History
- Date made: 14 May 1991
- Entry into force: 17 May 1991
- Implementation date: 1 January 1993//25 May 2009

Preparative texts
- Commission proposal: C91, 1989-04-12, p. 4 C320, 1990-12-20, p. 22
- EESC opinion: C329, 1989-12-30, p. 4
- EP opinion: C231, 1990-09-17, p. 78
- Reports

Other legislation
- Replaces: —
- Amends: —
- Amended by: 93/98/EEC
- Replaced by: Directive 2009/24/EC on the legal protection of computer programs

The European Union Computer Programs Directive controls the legal protection of computer programs under the copyright law of the European Union. It was issued under the internal market provisions of the Treaty of Rome. The most recent version is Directive 2009/24/EC.

== History ==
In Europe, the need to foster the computer software industry brought attention to the lack of adequate harmonisation among the copyright laws of the various EU nations with respect to such software. Economic pressure spurred the development of the first directive which had two goals (1) the harmonisation of the law and (2) dealing with the problems caused by the need for interoperability.

The first EU Directive on the legal protection of computer programs was Council Directive 91/250/EEC of 14 May 1991. It required (Art. 1) that computer programs and any associated design material be protected under copyright as literary works within the sense of the Berne Convention for the Protection of Literary and Artistic Works.

The Directive also defined the copyright protection to be applied to computer programs: the owner of the copyright has the exclusive right to authorise (Art 4):

- the temporary or permanent copying of the program, including any copying which may be necessary to load, view or run the program;
- the translation, adaptation or other alteration to the program;
- the distribution of the program to the public by any means, including rental, subject to the first-sale doctrine.

However, these rights are subject to certain limitations (Art. 5). The legal owner of a program is assumed to have a licence to create any copies necessary to use the program and to alter the program within its intended purpose (e.g. for error correction). The legal owner may also make a back-up copy for his or her personal use. The program may also be decompiled if this is necessary to ensure it operates with another program or device (Art. 6), but the results of the decompilation may not be used for any other purpose without infringing the copyright in the program. According to the lawyer Patrice-Emmanuel Schmitz and based on recitals 10 and 15 of the Directive, the copyright exception applies also when no decompilation is needed, i.e. when open source code is publicly available.

The duration of the copyright was originally fixed at the life of the author plus fifty years (Art. 8), in accordance with the Berne Convention standard for literary works (Art. 7.1 Berne Convention). This has since been prolonged to the life of the author plus seventy years by the 1993 Copyright Duration Directive (superseded but confirmed by the 2006 Copyright Term Directive).

Council Directive 91/250/EEC was formally replaced by Directive 2009/24/EC on 25 May 2009, which consolidated "the various minor amendments the original directive had received over the years".

== Implementation ==
Implementation of the Directive by Member States
(Austria)	Austria	Urheberrechtsgesetznovelle 1993, BGBl. No. 93/1993, p. 1166
(Belgium)	Belgium	Law of 30.06.1994 (French), Law of 30.06.1994 (Flemish), Moniteur Belge du 17 juillet 1994, p. 19315
(Bulgaria)	Bulgaria	unknown
(Cyprus)	Cyprus	unknown
(Czech Republic)	Czech Republic	Law No. 121/2000 Coll. of 7 April 2000 on Copyright, Rights Related to Copyright and on the Amendment of Certain Laws
(Denmark)	Denmark	LOV nr 1010 af 19/12/1992 updated by LBK nr 1144 af 23/10/2014
(Estonia)	Estonia	Autoriõiguse seadus (2024-10-12)
(Finland)	Finland	Laws Nos. 418/93 and 419/93, Finnish Official Journal of 1993-05-12, p. 415
(France)	France	Loi n^{o} 94–361 du 10 mai 1994 portant mise en oeuvre de la directive (C. E. E.) n^{o} 91–250 du Conseil des communautés européennes en date du 14 mai 1991 concernant la protection juridique des programmes d'ordinateur et modifiant le code de la propriété intellectuelle
(Germany)	Germany	Zweites Gesetz zur Änderung des Urheberrechtsgesetzes vom 9. Juni 1993, BGBl I p. 910
(Greece)	Greece	Law No. 2121/93, Official Journal A No. 25
(Hungary)	Hungary	unknown
(Republic of Ireland)	Ireland	European Communities (Legal Protection of Computer Programs) Regulations, 1993 (S.I. No. 26 of 1993)
(Italy)	Italy	Decreto Legislativo No. 518 del 29 dicembre 1992
(Latvia)	Latvia	Autortiesību likums (2000-04-06)
(Lithuania)	Lithuania	Autorių teisių ir gretutinių teisių įstatimas N. VIII-1185 (1999-05-18)
(Luxembourg)	Luxembourg	Loi du 18 avril 2001 sur les droits d'auteur, les droits voisins et les bases de données. Section 7 – Les programmes d'ordinateur
(Malta)	Malta	Copyright Act, 2000
(Netherlands)	Netherlands	Wet van 07.07.1994, Stb. JS-1994, p. 521
(Poland)	Poland	Ustawa z 4 lutego 1994 o prawie autorskim i prawach pokrewnych, art. 74–77, Dz.U. 1994 nr 24 poz. 83
(Portugal)	Portugal	Decreto-Lei n. 252/94, de 20 de Outubro de 1994, Diário da República – I Série A, no. 243 de 20 de Outubro de 1994, p. 6374
(Romania)	Romania	Law No.8/1996 updated November 2014, state authority: Romanian Copyright Office, see also Intellectual property in Romania
(Slovakia)	Slovakia	Copyright Act of 1997-12-05 (No. 383/1997)
(Slovenia)	Slovenia	Zakon o avtorskih in sorodnih pravicah (1995-03-30)
(Spain)	Spain	Ley 16/1993, de 23 de diciembre, de incorporación al Derecho español de la Directiva 91/250/CEE, de 14 de mayo, sobre la protección jurídica de programas de ordenador
(Sweden)	Sweden	Act No. 1687/92
(United Kingdom)	United Kingdom	Copyright (Computer Programs) Regulations 1992 No. 3233

== See also ==
- Copyright law of the European Union
- Software copyright
