= Section 115 Reform Act of 2006 =

Bill introduced to US Congress

The Section 115 Reform Act of 2006 ("SIRA" or "S1RA") was a bill introduced June 8, 2006 in the 109th United States Congress by Howard Berman (California-D) and Lamar Smith (Texas-R) as part of (H.R. 5553). It is one of several recent attempts to modify Section 115 of the United States Copyright Act to accommodate digital delivery of musical works.

This bill was never enacted and thereby expired, but a revised version was incorporated into the Music Modernization Act twelve years later.

== Content ==
The central aim of the SIRA was to provide "legitimate digital music services with an efficient way to clear all the rights they [need] to make large numbers of musical works quickly available by an ever-evolving number of digital means while ensuring that the copyright holders are fairly compensated." The S1RA would have met this need by providing for a blanket license for digital music providers.

== Background ==
Section 115 of the United States Copyright Act outlines the scope of compulsory licenses for making and distributing phonorecords. Once a phonorecord of a nondramatic musical work has been distributed to the public, any other person, subject to certain conditions, may obtain a compulsory license to make or distribute copies of the work. In 1995, Congress enacted the Digital Performance Right in Sound Recordings Act in response to emerging technologies and business structures which allowed listeners to legally stream or download sound recordings on their computers. The DPRA included digital music providers, such as Rhapsody, Pandora Music, and XM Radio, among those who could obtain a compulsory license to distribute copies of phonorecords.

The licensure of digital music still remained somewhat ambiguous under the DPRA, but many believed that digital music providers were implicitly required to clear the rights of each individual song they made available.

As early as 2001, the Copyright Office initiated discussions to amend section 115 to resolve ambiguities and streamline licensing for digital music providers.

== Opposition ==
=== "Incidental Copies" ===
If enacted, the S1RA would have provided for a blanket license for digital music providers to reproduce and distribute "general and incidental" digital copies of musical works, including cache, network, and RAM buffer copies. Critics of the S1RA urged that the language of the bill implied that music consumers could be held liable for incidental copies created on their computers in the normal process of streaming, downloading, or playing the music they had purchased.

=== "Distributions" ===
Critics of the SIRA argued that the language of the bill incorrectly conflated "transmissions", such as interactive streams, with "distributions". It was argued that this conflation could unfairly limit the Fair Use right of music consumers to engage in legal home-taping, and the rights of digital music providers to make and distribute recording devices which could encourage home-taping. Both home-taping and the distribution of home-taping devices are legal in the United States under 17 U.S.C. § 106 of the Copyright Act and under the Audio Home Recording Act of 1992.

== Recent Proposals to Reform Section 115 ==
In November 2008, the U.S. Copyright Office announced the implementation of an interim regulation which would clarify the scope of section 115 for digital music providers. It has also been controversial. The copyright office has declined, in this interim regulation, to discuss whether RAM buffer copies and other incidental copies constitute copies under the meaning of the copyright act.

== See also ==
- Audio Home Recording Act
- Digital rights management
- Internet radio
- Platform Equality and Remedies for Rights Holders in Music Act of 2007
- Digital Millennium Copyright Act
- Music Modernization Act
