= Indiggo =

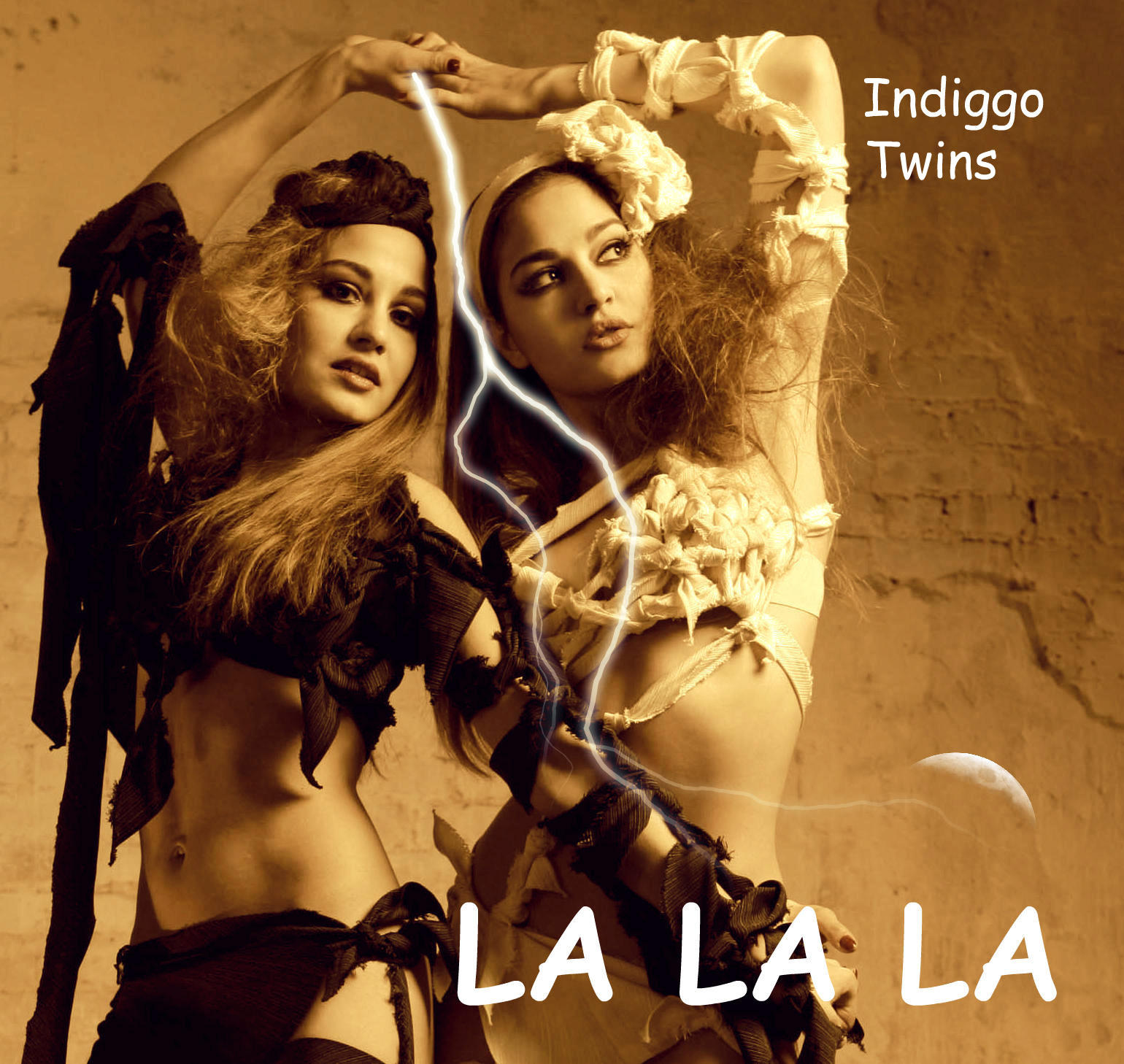
- Indiggo on the single cover of "La La La"

Background information
- Also known as: Indiggo Twins
- Born: Gabriela Modorcea; Mihaela Modorcea; June 7, 1985 (age 41); Brașov, Romania
- Genres: Pop; theatrical pop; musical theatre
- Occupations: Actresses; choreographers; composers; costume designers; dance teachers; dancers; novelists; poets; reality television personalities; singers; songwriters
- Instruments: Piano; guitar
- Years active: 2000–present
- Labels: Ariola; Broadway; Bros Music; DAS Label; MediaPro Music; Sony BMG Music Entertainment
- Website: www.indiggotwins.com; www.wickedclone.com

Indiggo and the Indiggo Twins are the stage names for Gabriela Modorcea and Mihaela Modorcea, twin sisters and Romanian-American professional actresses, dancers, singers, and writers. They were born in Romania, received visas for extraordinary artistic abilities, became American citizens and live in New York City. They speak English, French, German and Romanian and sing in seven languages.

They wrote, composed, choreographed, designed and perform their Off Broadway play Wicked Clone The Cinema Musical (2018) based on Mihaela's 500-page novel Wicked Clone or how to deal with the evil (2016). New York City Guide's Theatre Editor Griffin Miller describes the show as “a rare piece of visual and audio creativity” that "turns the tables on tradition by telling ‘the story of a vampire bitten by a human being’”. They wrote, composed, arranged, designed and performed their original cast recording album of 25 "immortal" songs.

American rappers Kanye West and Jay-Z sampled Indiggo's single "La La La" (2011) on their collaborative album Watch the Throne (2011). New York Times reviewer Jon Caramanica describes the sample as "moving" and a "gem". Their singles "Hip Hop Jam" (2003) and "Be My Boyfriend" (2006) entered the top of the charts and the singles and their album Indiggo found commercial success in Germanic territories. They signed a worldwide, multi-year, co-publishing/grand rights deal with international music publisher Imagem.

Mihaela has written two poetry books, Rage and Love and Wicked Clone or how to get reborn. Gabriela appeared in the film National Lampoon's Van Wilder: The Rise of Taj (2006) and in the Law & Order: Special Victims Unit episode "Hothouse". They were semi-finalists on America's Got Talent and acted in the Russian-American film Lyubov v bolshom gorode (No Love in the Big City). They have performed in a number of awarded musicals and finished seventh in the Romanian qualifiers for the 2006 Eurovision Song Contest.

== Background ==
=== Romanian childhood ===
The twins were born in 1985 in Brașov, Transylvania, Romania. Their father, Grid, a PhD, writer, filmmaker and critic, worked for 30 years as a film producer and screenwriter at the Romanian National Center for Cinematography and for Romanian National Television. Their mother, Violeta, has a PhD and is a writer, literature teacher and translator of Mongolian, Russian, and American literature.

At the age of six, they began studying piano, guitar, canto and dance. At the age of twelve, they debuted on Christmas Eve on Romanian Television singing the carol "Colinde, colinde", written by Mihai Eminescu, generally regarded as Romania's greatest poet. They have performed regularly on German and European TV shows. They speak English, French, German and Romanian and sing in seven languages.

They graduated from the Theatre Department of the National University of Theatre and Film "I.L.Caragiale" in Bucharest, Romania, with the highest score of 10. They are the first twin actresses in Romanian theater. After graduation, they went to Germany to record "I do not need Georgie Clooney, I do not need David Beckham," composed by their producer, Dieter Bohlen, and to study acting.

=== Adulthood ===
They continued their study of acting in New York where they live. In 2008, they received visas under the extraordinary artistic abilities category. They have appeared on The Tyra Banks Show, TMZ, The Happy Hour (FOX Business Network) and Hair Battle Spectacular (Oxygen (TV channel)); in advertisements for Dell Computers, the New York Knicks and Wodka Gorbatschow, and in music videos with Danny Aiello, Lindsay Lohan, 50 Cent and Kanye West. In October 2013, they became American citizens, performing The Star-Spangled Banner during their oath ceremony.

In August 2011, they signed a worldwide, multi-year co-publishing/grand rights deal with international music publisher Imagem.

They are members of ASCAP (American Society of Composers, Authors and Publishers). They created and teach Hip Hop Belly Dancing at a dance studio in the Flatiron District of New York City. They are working on an album with American music manager DAS Communications' David Sonenberg, Peter Zizzo, Rockwilder, DJ Paul Oakenfold, and Swizz Beatz.

== Music ==
=== Indiggo (2000) and "Hip Hop Jam" (2003) ===
MediaPro Music released their first CD album Indiggo (2000), containing several hit singles: "Nu-mi pasa", "Clar de luna" and "Am eu grija de mine", and selling in over 20 European countries, including Austria, Germany and Switzerland. Indiggo's first Europe-wide single, "Hip Hop Jam", (BROS Music, 2003), a song with Cuban influences produced by David Brandes, entered the German charts.

=== "Be My Boyfriend" (2006) ===
On February 24, 2006, they qualified for the National Final of the Romanian qualifications for the 2006 Eurovision Song Contest and on February 26, performing "Be My Boyfriend", they finished seventh. On March 10, Sony BMG Music Entertainment, Ariola, released the pop/rock CD single "Be My Boyfriend", which entered the German charts.

=== "Love Struck" (2007) ===
Of the five songs Indiggo submitted for the 2007 Eurovision Song Contest, two were their own compositions, the other three were composed by Dieter Bohlen, Thomas G:son and Philip Vella. Of the 259 songs submitted, "Love Struck", composed by Thomas G:son and written by Gerard James Borg, was one of the 24 songs selected for the semi-finals.

=== "La La La" (2011) ===
In August 2011, rappers Jay-Z and Kanye West released their first collaborative album, Watch the Throne. The track "Murder to Excellence" contains a sample of Indiggo's "La La La". Complex's Kathy Iandola says "La La La" is a "tribal pop track" that becomes "haunting" as Jay-Z and Kanye West discuss the rise in murder rates and black on black crime. The rappers describe Indiggo as "ambassadors of the great Romanian tradition".

On December 16, 2011, DAS Label, Inc. released Indiggo's "La La La". Complex, a New York City youth culture magazine reporting on trends in music with a focus on hip hop, ranks Indiggo's "La La La" 18th on their Best White Girl Vocal Samples in Rap History, and the New York Times' Jon Caramanica describes it as "moving" and a "gem".

=== Wicked Clone The Cinema Musical (2018) ===
Working since 2010, through three showcases and three productions, they wrote, composed, choreographed, designed and perform their Off Broadway play Wicked Clone The Cinema Musical (2018). Basing the show on their 500-page bestseller Wicked Clone or how to deal with the evil (2016), a cinema novel, the original story begins in 15th century Transylvania, with the birth of identical twin sisters Mihaela and Gabriela, and tracks Mihaela, whose desire to be human and loved takes her to modern day New York City; and Gabriela, who ventures through time and space to return her sister to her vampiric heritage. The 90 minute show is a blend of musical theatre and film with a mystical story, film projections from beginning till the end, 21 original compositions, dancing and a symphonic soundtrack.

City Guide's Theatre Editor Griffin Miller describes the show as "a rare piece of visual and audio creativity" with "totally Transylvanian vogue" costumes, "supernatural ambience, unique staging and ... immortal" performances that "turns the tables on tradition by telling 'the story of a vampire bitten by a human being'", and says, "this wildly inventive show—involving singing, dancing, time-travel, film, and a symphonic soundtrack—beckons theatregoers to the underbelly of Nuevo Entertainment".

They released a cast album of 25 original songs through Broadway Records digitally on September 21, 2018, and physically on October 5, 2018, which they wrote, arranged and produced. They play piano, guitar and drums and sing in different harmonies. The album has four opening songs, 19 songs from the show (from "La La La," sampled in Watch the Throne, to "I am Like God") and two closing songs.

== Other endeavors ==
=== Poetry ===
In 2006, Mihaela published her first poetry book, Rage and Love. In 2015, she published her second poetry book, Wicked Clone or how to get reborn.

=== Stage ===
In 2006, they played the leads Louise and Henriette in the musical The Two Orphans at the Casandra Theater, the theatre of the "L. L. Caragiale" National Theater and Cinema Art University, winning the Grand Prix at the Graduates' Gala. Monica Andronescu in Jurnalul National describes the show as a parody of a typical romance where an abandoned child is found after years of suffering and wandering. She continues, "An extraordinary explosion of energy and talent sums up the show The Two Orphans … It is worth highlighting the interpretation of the two orphans, Mihaela and Gabriela Modorcea, who prove, besides acting talent, real musical skills."

After seeing their performance, Romanian playwright Dumitru Radu Popescu, former chairman of the Romanian Writers' Union, wrote a play for them, Two Sisters, published in the award-nominated volume Mr. Fluture and Mrs. Fluture. Later, Romanian director Mihai Maniutiu cast Mihaela and Gabriela in Eugene Ionesco's The Future is in Eggs. Romanian Alexa Visarion directed them as the Twin Towers in America Alive, a show in memory of September 11, 2001.

=== Film ===
Gabriela acted in the movie Van Wilder: The Rise of Taj (2006) as "Taj's Sister". In 2009, they acted together in the Russian-American film Lyubov v bolshom gorode (No Love in the Big City), as "Bliznyashka No. 1." and "Bliznyashka No. 2.".

=== Television ===
In 2008, Gabriela appeared as "Veronica Pankovich" on the episode "Hothouse" of the television series Law & Order: Special Victims Unit, which first aired on NBC on January 13, 2009. Later in 2008, they were semi-finalists on Season 3 of America's Got Talent, an American television reality show talent competition.

== Discography ==
- Indiggo (2000), Indiggo, Bucharest, Romania: MediaPro Music
- Indiggo (2003), Hip Hop Jam, Weil am Rhein, Germany: Bros Music
- Indiggo (March 10, 2006), Be My Boyfriend, Munich, Germany: Sony BMG Music Entertainment and Ariola Records
- Indiggo Twins (December 16, 2011), La La La, New York City, New York: DAS Label
- Indiggo Twins (December 4, 2014), Cover Me, New York City, New York: Indiggo Twins
- Indiggo Twins (April 13, 2015), Tell Me Less & Love Me More, New York City, New York: Indiggo Twins
- Indiggo Twins (September 21, 2018), Wicked Clone, New York City, New York: Broadway Records, archived from the original on September 25, 2018

== Publications ==
- Modorcea, Gabriela; Modorcea, Mihaela (2018), Wicked Clone or How to Deal with the Evil (Original Off-Broadway Cast Recording) (Liner notes), New York City, New York: Indiggo Twins
- Modorcea, Mihaela (2016), Clona Rea sau Ce sa faci cu Raul [Wicked Clone or how to deal with the evil] (in Romanian), translated by Modorcea, Violeta, New York City, New York: Barnes & Noble Press, ISBN 978-0-990-44675-0
- Modorcea, Mihaela (2006), Furie și iubire [Rage and Love] (in Romanian and English), Bucharest, Romania: TIBO Publishing House, ISBN 978-973-87392-2-2, OCLC 712202971
- Modorcea, Mihaela (2016), Wicked Clone or how to deal with the evil (2nd ed.), New York City, New York: Barnes & Noble Press, ISBN 978-0-990-44671-2
- Modorcea, Mihaela (2016), Modorcea, Gabriela (ed.), Wicked Clone or how to get reborn (2nd ed.), New York City, New York: Barnes & Noble Press, ISBN 978-0-990-44672-9

== See also ==
- List of music released by Romanian artists that has charted in major music markets

== Bibliography ==
- Green, Susan; Dawn, Randee (2009), Law & Order: Special Victims Unit: The Unofficial Companion, Dallas, Texas: BenBella Books, ISBN 978-1933771-88-5
- Modorcea, Grid (2009), Twins Indiggo (in Romanian and English), Craiova, Romania: Sim Art (Aius), ISBN 978-973-1841-21-2, OCLC 712201070
- Modorcea, Violeta (2009), Contractul sau Cum am devenit vampiri [The contract or How we became vampires : Dracula's girls'/Indiggo twins' show] (in Romanian and English), Craiova, Romania: Sim Art (Aius), OCLC 895468656
- Modorcea, Violeta (1997), Viziuni teatrale complementare : Cehov şi Gorki [Complementary theatrical visions: Chekhov and Gorky] (in Romanian), Bucharest, Romania: EMIN, ISBN 978-9-7396-9495-7, OCLC 895714216
- Nuvela mongolă contemporană [Contemporary Mongolian novels] (in Romanian), translated by Modorcea, Violeta; Ciurca, Mariana, Bucharest, Romania: Univers, 1978, OCLC 997439129
- West, Kanye; Carter, Shawn (2011), Watch the Throne (PDF digital booklet), Universal Music Group
