= RightsFlow =

American music licensing company

- Type: Subsidiary
- Genre: Music
- Founded: 2007
- Founder: Patrick Sullivan (President, Founder and CEO); Benjamin Cockerham (Founder, CFO and Chief Strategy Officer)
- Headquarters: New York City, United States
- Services: Accounting; Administration; Licensing
- Owner: Google (2011–present)
- Parent: YouTube
- Website: rightsflow.com

RightsFlow Inc. is an American music licensing company founded in 2007. RightsFlow is headquartered in New York City. It was co-founded by Patrick Sullivan and Benjamin Cockerham.

== Brief history ==
Since its inception, RightsFlow has developed a broad client base, serving over 16,000 clients. These include notable entities such as YouTube, Muzak, Wolfgang's Vault, and Rhapsody. Additionally, it collaborates with platforms like CDBaby, Disc Makers, We Print Discs, and Zynga. RightsFlow gained recognition for its workplace environment, ranking No. 8 on Crain's New York's "Best Places to Work in NYC" in 2011. The company was acquired by Google on December 9, 2011, and now operates as a subsidiary of YouTube.

== Services ==
RightsFlow provided online music services, offering record companies, distributors, and artists the ability to license music and lyrics while managing payments for rightsholders. Through its LimeLight service, RightsFlow facilitates the acquisition of mechanical licenses for individuals, artists, and bands. Through its MySpark service, the company simplifies copyright registration with the United States Copyright Office.
