= Ben Cockerham =

American musician (born 1980)

Ben Cockerham (born 1980) co-founded royalty processing companies RightsFlow and Source3, both known for simplifying the complex process of U.S. copyright compliance. Cockerham also is a composer, arranger and musician in musical groups out of Brooklyn, NY.

== Entrepreneur ==
Cockerham holds a Bachelor's from Baylor University in music composition, and a graduate degree from New York University's Music Business (MUBG-MA) – Master of Arts Program. While at NYU, he worked at digital music service eMusic where he met colleague Patrick Sullivan. They later joined The Orchard working for founders Richard Gottehrer and Scott Cohen, to implement innovative global licensing, revenue and marketing opportunities for musicians and labels. Cockerham also managed day-to-day music licensing for film, TV advertising, and royalties collections. In 2006, he co-produced Hard Rock International's SERVE2 project – a compilation album featuring previously unreleased tracks from Bruce Springsteen, Bob Dylan, Jackson Browne, Joss Stone and other influential artists – to benefit WhyHunger, distributed through The Orchard via iTunes.

In 2007, Cockerham and Sullivan parlayed their first-hand knowledge for simplifying the complex process of U.S. copyright compliance to found RighstFlow, also providing support for online entities including Muzak, The Orchard, CD Baby, and DiskMakers. Google acquired RightsFlow in 2011 to streamline music royalties processes for its YouTube platform.

In 2014, Cockerham and Sullivan, together with YouTube's Scott Sellwood, formed a startup called Source3 as a 3D printing rights management company that expanded into recognition technology for intellectual property, trademarks and copyright. In June 2017, Facebook acquired Source3 to fight piracy of illegally-shared content, and to support the development of Facebook's Rights Manager tool.

== Bandleader ==
While attending NYU, Cockerham began establishing himself as a composer for film, television, and video games with fellow graduate student Nathan Madsen, and formed his own indie rock band, Sublunar Minds, after placing a Craigslist ad and auditioning trumpeter/harmonica player Frank Vigilante, also a key grip for major music videos and film. Cockerham fronts the band on vocals and guitar, as heard on the 2009 LP Get Hit in Your Soul, and 2012 EP The Last of the Natural Light.

Cockerham met classically trained percussionist Britton Matthews, also a native Texan with a music degree from Baylor University in NYC in 2004 through Facebook. They married in 2007 and formed singer-songwriter folk-pop duo The New Benjamin Britton, with Matthews on vibes and marimba and Cockerham on a Novax 8-string guitar, the same model created for the jazz funk guitarist Charlie Hunter. They toured in 2012 with Drunken Barn Dance, an alt-folk band helmed by attorney/musician Scott Sellwood and released an all-original album Raise A Glass Broken Land in 2013.

Later that year Cockerham debuted an EP of instrumental jazz recordings as bandleader, pianist, composer, and arranger of his 9-piece troupe Savoy in Color, titled The World You’re in Is Perfect, heavily influenced by the Gil Evans-Miles Davis collaborations of the 1950s & '60s. The group began to perform publicly in NYC in 2014, and features session horn players Joe Ancowitz and Geoff Countryman who also appeared on Ghostface Killah's 2014 album 36 Seasons.

== Discography ==
- Sublunar Minds
  - Get Hit in Your Soul – CD – 2009
  - The Last of the Natural Light (EP) – CD – 2012
  - Lit Again in Our Time – CD – 2018
- The New Benjamin Britton
  - Raise A Glass Broken Land – CD – 2013
- Savoy in Color
  - The World You're in Is Perfect (EP) – CD – 2013
  - Hear Today Then (EP) – 2015
