= David Sonenberg =

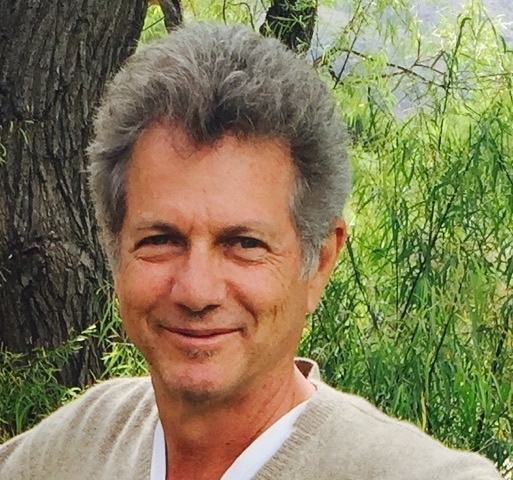

Background information
- Occupations: Music manager; film producer; lawyer

David Alan Sonenberg is an American music manager and the founder of DAS, a music management company on the Upper West Side of Manhattan, New York. He is a producer of the Oscar-winning film When We Were Kings (1997).

== Early life and education ==
Sonenberg grew up in New York and received a degree in theater and political science at Tufts University in Massachusetts and a juris doctor degree from Harvard Law School in Cambridge, Massachusetts. Since 1972, he has been a licensed attorney in New York.

== Career ==
Sonenberg joined the entertainment law firm of Weissberger & Frosch in Midtown Manhattan. There, he represented Broadway and Off-Broadway musical productions including Hair, Godspell, and Cabaret.

=== DAS Communications ===
Sonenberg then established his own law firm and began DAS Communications Ltd., a full-service management company in New York and Los Angeles for artists in the entertainment industry. DAS' first management project, Meat Loaf's Bat Out of Hell, set an industry record for a debut album with worldwide record sales to date of more than 50 million. Other clients of DAS Communications have included Jim Steinman, Jimmy Cliff, Southside Johnny, Jimmy Iovine, BeBe & CeCe Winans, Keith Thomas, Crossfire Choir, the Spin Doctors, Joan Osborne, Spacehog, Lauryn Hill and the Fugees, the Black Eyed Peas, John Legend, Kesha, Saraya, and Indiggo. Artists represented by DAS Communications have written, produced, and performed recordings with sales in excess of 300 million records worldwide.

DAS Ventures Ltd., another of the DAS family of companies, entered into agreements with Yoko Ono and the Estate of John Lennon in 1997 culminating in the launch of The John Lennon Songwriting Contest..

=== Productions ===
Sonenberg first worked as a producer on Celia Cruz and the Fania All-Stars in Africa and B.B. King: Live in Africa in 1974. In 1997, Sonenberg's first film project (an acclaimed documentary When We Were Kings) about Muhammad Ali was released. He received an Academy Award for Best Documentary Feature. In 2002, he produced Dance of the Vampires on Broadway.

== Personal ==
Sonenberg has two daughters and enjoys playing table tennis. On the track "How Many Mics" from the blockbuster album "The Score" by The Fugees, he was mentioned by Wyclef Jean in the lyric: So on my day off, with David Sonenberg I play golf. Run through Crown Heights screaming out, "Mazel tov!"
