= Copyright Duration Directive =

1993 European Union directive

Directive 93/98/EEC
- European Union directive
- Title: Directive harmonising the term of protection of copyright and certain related rights
- Made by: Council
- Made under: Arts. 57(2), 66 & 100a
- Journal reference: L290, 1993-11-24, pp. 9–13

History
- Date made: 29 October 1993
- Entry into force: 24 November 1993
- Implementation date: 1 July 1995

Preparative texts
- Commission proposal: C92, 1992-04-11, p. 6 C27, 1993-01-30, p. 7
- EESC opinion: C287, 1992-11-04, p. 53
- EP opinion: C337, 1992-12-22, p. 205
- Reports

Other legislation
- Replaces: —
- Amends: 91/250/EEC, 92/100/EEC
- Amended by: Information Society Directive (2001/29/EC)
- Replaced by: 2006/116/EC

Council Directive 93/98/EEC of 29 October 1993 harmonising the term of protection of copyright and certain related rights is a European Union directive in the field of EU copyright law, made under the internal market provisions of the Treaty of Rome. It was replaced by the 2006 Copyright Term Directive (2006/116/EC).

== Duration of protection ==
The principal goal was to ensure that there was a single duration for copyright and related rights across the entire European Union. The chosen term for a work was 70 years from the death of the author (post mortem auctoris, pma) for authors' rights regardless of when the work was first lawfully published (Art. 1), longer than the 50-year post mortem auctoris term required by the Berne Convention for the Protection of Literary and Artistic Works (Art. 7.1 Berne Convention). In the case that the author is anonymous or pseudonymous the term for a work is 70 years from the date of first lawful publication. The directive notes that the original goal of the Berne Convention was to protect works for two generations after the death of the author, and that fifty years was no longer sufficient for this purpose (para. 5 of the preamble). It is often stated that 70 years pma was the longest copyright term of any Member State at the time: this is not strictly correct, and is not quoted as the reason for the choice in the directive. Where a Member State protected a work for a longer period at the time the directive came into force, the copyright term is not reduced [Art. 10(1)], but other Member States will not respect the longer period.

The duration of protection of related rights (those of performers, phonogram and film producers and broadcasting organisations) was set at fifty years with the following rules for calculating the starting date (Art. 3). This fifty-year period was in reflexion of the negotiating position of the European Community at the negotiations which led to the Marrakech Agreements, including the Agreement on Trade-Related Aspects of Intellectual Property Rights (TRIPS).

Rightholders	Commencement
Performers	the date of the performance, unless a fixation of the performance is lawfully published or lawfully communicated to the public within this period, in which case the date of the first such publication or the first such communication to the public, whichever is the earlier.
Phonogram producers	the date the fixation is made, unless the phonogram is lawfully published or lawfully communicated to the public during this period, in which case the date of the first such publication or the first such communication to the public, whichever is the earlier.
Film producers	the date the fixation is made, unless the film is lawfully published or lawfully communicated to the public during this period, in which case the date of the first such publication or the first such communication to the public, whichever is the earlier.
Broadcasting organisations	the first transmission of a broadcast, whether this broadcast is transmitted by wire or over the air, including by cable or satellite.

=== Copyright restoration ===
The new copyright terms applied also to works which were already in existence when it came into force, as was held by the European Court of Justice in the Butterfly case, even if they had previously entered the public domain. Strictly, they applied to works which were protected in at least one Member State on 1 July 1995, although most Member States chose to apply them to all works which would qualify on the basis of the protection terms, regardless of protection elsewhere: this approach is much simpler for national courts to apply, as they do not have to consider foreign laws.

The effect of the approach was shown by the judgment of the European Court of Justice in the Puccini case, which covered facts arising before the directive entered force. The State of Hesse in Germany had staged the opera La Bohème by Puccini during the 1993/94 season at the Hessische Staatstheater Wiesbaden without the permission of the copyright holder. The opera was first published in Italy and Puccini died on 29 November 1924. At the time, Italy applied a copyright period of 56 years pma, so Italian protection had expired at the end of 1980: Germany, however, applied a 70 years pma period to works of German authors and the "rule of the shorter term" (Art. 7.8 Berne Convention) to foreign works. The Court ruled that the application of the rule of the shorter term between Member States was a breach of the principle of non-discrimination enshrined in Article 12 of the Treaty instituting the European Community: hence the work should have been protected in Germany even if it was no longer protected in Italy. Such cases should no longer arise with the implementation of the directive.

As of 2015, all works affected by the copyright restoration have re-entered the public domain.

== Films and photographs ==
The directive also harmonises the copyright treatment of films ("cinematographic and other audiovisual works") and photographs throughout the European Union. Films are protected for 70 years from the death of the last of the following people to die [Art. 2(2)]: the principal director, the author of the screenplay, the author of the dialogue and the composer of music specifically created for use in the cinematographic or audiovisual work. This applies regardless of the provisions of national law regarding the authorship of the film, ensuring a common duration of copyright between Member States. The principal director of the film is always considered as an author of the film, although national legislations may provide for other co-authors [Art. 2(1)].

Before the directive, different Member States had applied widely different criteria of originality and creativity to the copyright protection of photographs. These were harmonised by article 6, which states that the only permissible criterion for full protection (70 years pma) is that the photograph is "original in the sense that [it is] the author's own intellectual creation". Member States may protect photographs which do not meet this criterion by sui generis related rights.

== Previously unpublished works ==
The directive accords a publication right to the publisher of a public domain work which was previously unpublished, for 25 years after the date of publication (Art. 4). The work must have been "legally published". In some countries (e.g. France), authors and their heirs have a perpetual right to authorise (or not) the publication of a work and, in these cases, publication must be with the consent of the holders of the moral rights in the work.

== Other provisions ==
As is normal in the field of copyright law, all periods of protection run until the end of the calendar year in which they would otherwise expire (Art. 8). Member states may protect "critical and scientific publications of works which have come into the public domain" for a maximum of thirty years (Art. 5). The protection of moral rights is left to national legislation (Art. 9).

== Implementation ==
Implementation of the Directive by Member States
(Austria)	Austria	Urheberrechtsgesetznovelle 1996 (1998)
(Belgium)	Belgium	Wet van 30 juni 1994 betreffende het auteursrecht en de naburige rechten / Loi du 30 juin 1994 relative au droit d'auteur et aux droits voisins
(Bulgaria)	Bulgaria	Хармонизиран със Закон за изменение и допълнение на Закона за авторското право и сродните му права (04.04.2000)
(Cyprus)	Cyprus	Copyright Act 2006
(Czech Republic)	Czech Republic	Law No. 121/2000 Coll. of 7 April 2000 on Copyright, Rights Related to Copyright and on the Amendment of Certain Laws (Copyright Act)
(Denmark)	Denmark	Act on Copyright 1995 No. 395
(Estonia)	Estonia	Autoriõiguse seaduse ja sellega seonduvate seaduste muutmise seadus (09.12.1999)
(Finland)	Finland	Asetus tekijänoikeuslain soveltamisesta eräissä tapauksissa Euroopan talousalueeseen kuuluvista valtioista peräisin oleviin suojan kohteisiin
(France)	France	Loi No 97-283 du 27 mars 1997 portant transposition dans le code de la propriété intellectuelle des directives du Conseil des Communautés européennes Nos 93/83 du 27 septembre 1993 et 93/98 du 29 octobre 1993
(Germany)	Germany	Drittes Gesetz zur Änderung des Urheberrechtsgesetzes vom 23. Juni 1995.
(Greece)	Greece	Law No. 2557/1997 (Article 8), Government Gazette A-271/24-12-1997
(Hungary)	Hungary	Implemented in two acts .
(Republic of Ireland)	Ireland	European Communities (Term of Protection of Copyright) Regulations, 1995 (S.I. No. 158 of 1995)
(Italy)	Italy	Law No. 52 of 1996-02-06
(Latvia)	Latvia	Autortiesību likums (2000-04-06)
(Lithuania)	Lithuania	Autorių teisių ir gretutinių teisių įstatimas N. VIII-1185 (1999-05-18)
(Luxembourg)	Luxembourg	Loi du 8 septembre 1997 portant modification de la loi modifiée du 29 mars 1972 sur le droit d'auteur et de la loi du 23 septembre 1975 sur la protection des artistes interprètes ou exécutants, des producteurs de phonogrammes et des organismes de radiodiffusion ("droits voisins") en ce qui concerne la durée de protection
(Malta)	Malta	Copyright Act, 2000
(Netherlands)	Netherlands	Wet van 21 December 1995 tot wijziging van de voorstellen van wet tot wijziging van de Auteurswet 1912 en de Wet op de naburige rechten in verband met de richtlijn nr. 93/98/EEG van de Raad van de Europese Gemeenschappen van 29 oktober 1993, betreffende de harmonisatie van de beschermingstermijn van het auteursrecht en van bepaalde naburige rechten (PbEG L290) en in verband met de richtlijn van 19 November 1992, PbEG 1992, L346/61 betreffende het verhuurrecht, het uitleenrecht en bepaalde naburige rechten op het gebied van intellectuele eigendom Wet van 21 December 1995 tot wijziging van de Auteurswet 1912 en de Wet op de naburige rechten in verband met de richtlijn, nr. 93/98/EEC van de raad van de Europese Gemeenschappen van 29 oktober 1993, betreffende de harmonisatie van de beschermingstermijn van het auteursrecht en van bepaalde naburige rechten (PbEG L290)
(Poland)	Poland	Implemented in 2000/2002
(Portugal)	Portugal	Decreto-Lei n. 334/97, de 27 de Novembro de 1997, transposição da Directiva 93/98/EEC de Outubro 1993, relativa à harmonização do prazo de protecção dos direitos de autor e de certos direitos conexos, with effective date of 1 July 1995.
(Romania)	Romania	Law No. 8 of March 14, 1996
(Slovakia)	Slovakia	Copyright Act of 1997-12-05 (No. 383/1997)
(Slovenia)	Slovenia	Copyright and Related Rights Act (Zakon o avtorski in sorodnih pravicah; passed on 30 March 1995, last amended in December 2006)
(Spain)	Spain	Ley 27/1995 de 11 de octubre, de incorporación al Derecho español de la Directiva 93/98/CEE del Consejo, de 29 de octubre de 1993, relativa a la armonización del plazo de protección del derecho de autor y de determinados derechos afines
(Sweden)	Sweden	Implemented in 1995
(United Kingdom)	United Kingdom	Duration of Copyright and Rights in Performance Regulations 1995, SI 1995/3297, amending the UK Copyright, Designs and Patents Act 1988.

== See also ==
- Copyright law of the European Union
- Grandfather clause
- Directive on the term of protection of copyright and certain related rights
