= Music Reports =

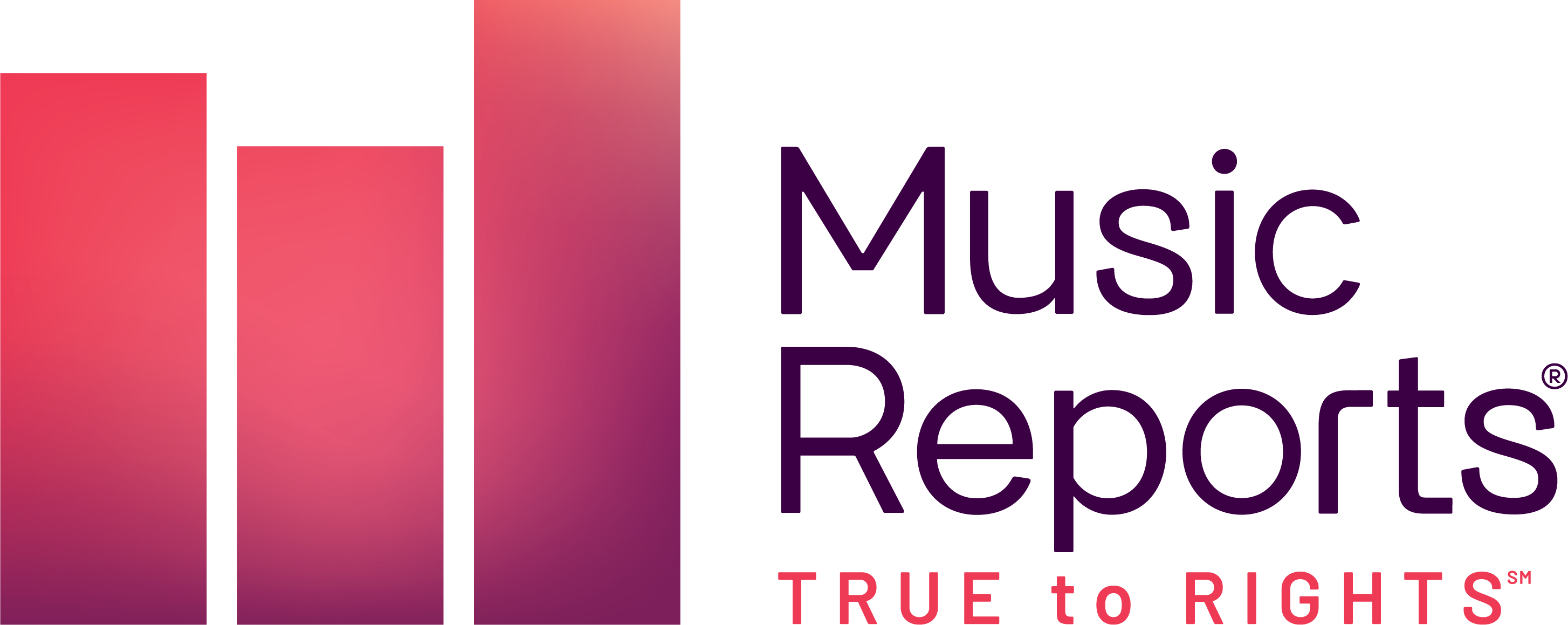
- Type: Private
- Industry: Internet
- Founded: 1995
- Founder: Ronald H. Gertz, Esq. Douglas J. Brainin
- Headquarters: Woodland Hills, Los Angeles, California, United States
- Area served: Worldwide
- Key people: Jason Walker; William B. Colitre; Denise Crayne; Aaron Partington; Kate J. Cross
- Services: Research; Licensing and Administration; Accounting; Cue Sheet Management; Analytics; Software Development and Hosting
- Number of employees: 130
- Parent: Musixmatch
- Website: www.musicreports.com

Music Reports is an American music rights administration and technology company, founded in 1995 in Woodland Hills, California.

The company provides music rights licensing, administration, royalty accounting, and software development and hosting services. It maintains a registry of music rights and related business information.

In 2026, Music Reports was acquired by Italian lyrics website Musixmatch.

== History ==
Music Reports was established to provide alternatives to the blanket licensing structures offered by BMI and ASCAP for local television broadcasters. It developed an administration service supporting direct licensing for television composers, collection and processing of music usage data and television station schedules, and automated reporting of usage information to PROs.

Following the signing of the Digital Millennium Copyright Act in 1998, Music Reports initiated a program of copyright licensing for digital music services, including through a sister company, Royalty Logic, Inc., supporting interactive and non-interactive music streaming services.

== Overview of current services ==
Music Reports provides services in the following areas:

- Administration of ASCAP, BMI, and SESAC per-program licenses for television broadcasters, cable networks, and streaming networks.
- Master, synchronization, mechanical, and performing rights licensing for broadcasters, film and television producers, cable programming services, OTT services, and streaming music services.
- Cue sheet management, analytics, and distribution.
- Enterprise-level licensing and royalty accounting services for digital media services, mobile device and carrier clients, and content owners.
- Copyright research for users of sound recordings and musical compositions.

Music Reports maintains Songdex, a database and registry of music rights covering sound recordings, musical compositions, publishers, and composers, and launched Songdex.com for registered users. Music Reports serves as a per-program license administrator for local television stations in the United States, including stations associated with ABC, CBS, and NBC. The company also handles music rights clearances, licensing, and accounting for digital music services such as Amazon, Deezer, Flipagram, Microsoft, Pandora Music, iHeartRadio, PlayNetwork, Soundtrack Your Brand, Hoopla, SiriusXM, Slacker, SoundCloud, Musical.ly, Tidal, and MelodyVR, along with copyright research, licensing, and consulting services.
