= Publication right =

Legal right akin to copyright

Publication right is a type of copyright granted to the publisher who first publishes a previously unpublished work after that work's original copyright has expired. It is in almost all respects the same as standard copyright, but excludes moral rights. Publication right is mainly found in the law of European countries and has no direct correspondence in US copyright law. Within the European Union, not all countries originally had such a right and, where they did, terms varied, but in 1993 national laws were required to be harmonized by EU Directive 93/98/EEC to provide a standardised period of protection of 25 years from first publication.

== Germany ==
Germany has had a publication right since 1965, originally with a term of 10 years from publication. The term was extended in 1990 to 25 years.

== France ==
In French copyright law, article 23 of the March 11, 1957 Act granted a 50-year exploitation right term for posthumous works, vested in the author's successors if the work was made available to the public during the 50 years following the year of his death, and vested in the owner of the work after that period.

In 1985, the term was extended to 70 years for musical compositions with or without lyrics.

This article was codified as article L. 123-4 of the Intellectual property code in 1992.

In 1997, the exploitation right term of posthumous works was reduced to 25 years, if the work was first made available to the public after the 70 years following the year of the author's death, as a consequence of the implementation of the EU Directive 93/98/EEC. However, Article 10 of that directive states that "where a term of protection, which is longer than the corresponding term provided for by this Directive, is already running in a Member State on the date referred to in Article 13 (1), this Directive shall not have the effect of shortening that term of protection in that Member State".

The owner of a copy of a posthumous work, as distinguished from the owner of the original of the work, is vested with no such right, where the copy was transmitted without intent of transmitting such right.

== United Kingdom ==
The requirement of the European Directive 93/98/EEC to introduce a publication right into national law was implemented in the UK on 1 December 1996 by the Copyright and Related Rights Regulations 1996, a Statutory instrument which modified the Copyright, Designs and Patents Act 1988.

Under the 1996 rules – which were slightly amended again by the Copyright and Related Rights Regulations 2003 – the right was granted to anyone who makes available to the public for the first time a previously-unpublished out-of-copyright work with the permission of the owner of the corresponding physical medium. Making available to the public includes such acts as issuing copies, making the work available online, and exhibiting the work in public.

Publication right expires at the end of the period of 25 years from the end of the calendar year in which the work was first published.

No publication right can arise from the publication of a work in which Crown copyright or Parliamentary copyright subsisted.

== See also ==
- Editio princeps
- First edition
