= CLASSICS Act =

Compensating Legacy Artists for their Songs, Service, and Important Contributions to Society Act
- Long title: To amend title 17, United States Code, to provide Federal protection to the digital audio transmission of a sound recording fixed before February 15, 1972, and for other purposes.
- Nicknames: CLASSICS Act
- Announced in: the 115th United States Congress
- Sponsored by: Darrell E. Issa
- Number of co-sponsors: 44

Legislative history
- Introduced in the House as H.R. 3301 by Darrell Issa (R-CA) on July 19, 2017; Committee consideration by House Committee on the Judiciary.; Signed into law by President Donald Trump on October 11, 2018

The CLASSICS Act or Compensating Legacy Artists for their Songs, Service, and Important Contributions to Society Act is Title II of the Music Modernization Act and was proposed legislation as H.R. 3301 of the 115th United States Congress to amend title 17 of the United States Code, to provide Federal protection to the digital audio transmission of a sound recording fixed before February 15, 1972, and for other purposes.

The bill was first introduced in the House of Representatives on July 19, 2017 by Representative Darrell Issa. A companion bill (S.2393) was introduced in the Senate by Senator Chris Coons on February 7, 2018.

The CLASSICS Act was consolidated into the Music Modernization Act (H.R.5447) on April 10, 2018. The Music Modernization Act passed in the House of Representatives on April 26, 2018, and passed the Senate on September 18, 2018, with the Senate renaming the bill the "Orrin G. Hatch Music Modernization Act" after Senator Orrin Hatch. The Music Modernization Act, with the CLASSICS Act codified as Title II within it, was signed into law by President Donald Trump on October 11, 2018.

Previously, sound recordings made before February 15, 1972 were not covered by federal copyright protection. Some states granted these recordings copyright protection and some did not. The CLASSICS Act was designed to address the patchwork of laws in different jurisdictions. The law grants federal copyright protection of the recordings until February 15, 2067.

The Music Modernization Act was revised to allow older songs to enter the public domain. All recordings published before 1923 entered the public domain on January 1, 2022. Recordings published 1923–1946 have 100-year copyright terms, and those published 1947–1956 have 110-year terms. (Note: Copyright terms that last a given number of years expire at the end of the final year. For example, a work published on June 1, 1925 that has a term of 100 years would enter the public domain on January 1, 2026.) Recordings will enter the public domain every January 1 from 2024 to 2047 and from 2058 to 2067. (Note: No recordings entered the public domain in 2023 due to the gap between the expiry date of the pre-1923 copyrights and the end of the first 100-year terms; likewise, none will enter between 2048 and 2057 due to the gap between the 100- and 110-year terms.)

All other recordings created before February 15, 1972, have their terms end on February 15, 2067.
