= Directive 2011/77/EU =

Directive 2011/77/EU on the term of protection of copyright and certain related rights amended Directive 2006/116/EC and extended the duration of performers' and producers' rights in phonograms (also known as sound recordings) from 50 to 70 years. It was passed by the Council of the European Union on 12 September 2011 after the European Parliament passed it on 23 April 2009 establishing a term of 70 years, lower than the 95 years the European Commission had proposed on 16 July 2008.

== Purpose of the extension ==
The stated purpose of the extension of the recording copyright term is to "bring performers' protection more in line with that already given to authors - 70 years after their death." The term in Directive 2006/116/EC is 50 years after publishing the performance, or 50 years after the performance if it is not published.

== Argument for and against ==
The Impact of Copyright Extension for Sound Recordings in the UK, a PriceWaterhouseCoopers report commissioned by the British Phonographic Industry and cited by the European Commission, suggested that the extension to 95 years would increase revenue by £2.2 million to £34.9 million in present value terms over the next ten years. It also suggested that the "prices of in-copyright and out-of-copyright sound recordings are not significantly different" so that consumers would not be impacted.

The Gowers review of Intellectual Property stated that "is not clear that extension of term would benefit musicians and performers very much in practice." An article written by Dutch academics and published in the European Intellectual Property Review, Never Forever: Why Extending the Term of Protection for Sound Recording is a Bad Idea, concluded that the arguments for copyright extension were not convincing.

== See also ==
- Copyright Term Extension Act (United States)
