= Platform Equality and Remedies for Rights Holders in Music Act of 2007 =

The Platform Equality and Remedies for Rights Holders in Music Act of 2007, also known as simply the Perform Act of 2007 and sometimes written as PERFORM Act was a bill introduced January 11, 2007 in the 110th Congress by Dianne Feinstein (California-D) and sponsored by Lindsey Graham (South Carolina-R), Joe Biden (Delaware-D), and Lamar Alexander (Tennessee-R) to the United States Senate as S. 256. It superseded the Platform Equality and Remedies for Rights Holders in Music Act of 2006.

If this bill had become law, it would have required the implementation of DRM protections and restrictions on digital audio transmissions, including those over the Internet (Internet radio) and XM Satellite Radio. It would also have required services to pay "fair market value" for copyrighted materials, as well, amending other laws to make this possible. In addition, recording devices would have been barred from disambiguating songs in audio streams. The act would have given consumers the explicit right to make "reasonable" recordings at home, for their own use, and to transfer those recordings to other computers within their home for playback.

== See also ==
- Digital Millennium Copyright Act
