= Copyright Term Directive 2006 =

Directive 2006/116/EC
- European Union directive
- Title: Directive on the term of protection of copyright and certain related rights (codified version)
- Made by: European Parliament & Council
- Made under: Arts. 47(2), 55 and 95
- Journal reference: L372, pp. 12–18

History
- Date made: 12 December 2006
- Entry into force: 17 January 2007
- Implementation date: 17 January 2007

Other legislation
- Replaces: Directive 93/98/EEC
- Amends: —
- Amended by: Directive 2011/77/EU
- Replaced by: —

The Copyright Term Directive 2006/116/EC is a consolidated version of the former EU Directive harmonising the term of copyright protection, including all amendments made up to and including 2006. It replaces the text of the older directive.

== Contents ==
Article 1 states that a copyright "shall run for the life of the author and for 70 years after his death, irrespective of the date when the work is lawfully made available to the public", or for jointly made works, after the death of the last surviving author.

Article 2 states that in the case of a work of joint authorship, the term referred to in article 1 is to be calculated from the death of the last surviving author.

Article 3 states the rights of performers shall expire 50 years after the date of the performance.

Article 4 states, where a Member of State provides for particular provisions on copyright in respect of collective works or for a legal person to be designated as the rightholder, the term of protection shall be calculated according to the provisions of paragraph

Article 5 states, when work is published in volumes, parts, instalments, issues or episodes and the term of protection runs from the time when the work was lawfully made available to the public, the term of protection shall run for each such item separately.

Article 6 states, in the case of works for which the term of protection is not calculated from the death of the author or authors and which have not been lawfully made available to the public within 70 years from their creation, the protection shall terminate.

== See also ==
- European Union law
- EU intellectual property law
