= Digital Performance Right in Sound Recordings Act =

Copyright law in the United States

- Long title: Digital Performance Right in Sound Recordings Act of 1995
- Acronyms (colloquial): DPRA
- Effective: Feb 1, 1996

Citations
- Public law: Pub. L. No. 104-39, 109 Stat. 336
- Statutes at Large: 109 Stat. 336

Codification
- Acts amended: Copyright Act of 1976
- Titles amended: 17 (Copyright)
- U.S.C. sections amended: 17 U.S.C. §§ 106, 114-115

Legislative history
- Introduced in the United States Senate as S.227 by Orrin Hatch (R–UT) on January 13, 1995; Committee consideration by Senate Judiciary Committee; House Judiciary Committee (Subcommittee on Courts and Intellectual Property); Passed the United States Senate on November 1, 1995; Passed the United States House of Representatives on October 17, 1995; Signed into law by President Bill Clinton on November 1, 1995

Major amendments
- Digital Millennium Copyright Act

The Digital Performance Right in Sound Recordings Act of 1995 (DPRA) is a United States Copyright law that grants owners of a copyright in sound recordings an exclusive right “to perform the copyrighted work publicly by means of a digital audio transmission.” The DPRA was enacted in response to the absence of a performance right for sound recordings in the Copyright Act of 1976 and a fear that digital technology would stand in for sales of physical records. The performance right for sound recordings under the DPRA is limited to transmissions over a digital transmission, so it is not as expansive as the performance right for other types of copyrighted works. The Digital Millennium Copyright Act (DMCA), enacted in 1998, modified the DPRA.

== Three-tier System ==
The DPRA categorizes services under three tiers, based on the service’s potential impact on record sales:

1. Non-subscription broadcast transmissions are exempt from requirements to pay license fees.
2. Non-interactive Internet transmissions are required to pay a statutory license established by the Copyright Royalty Board.
3. Interactive Internet transmission services are required to negotiate a license agreement with the copyright holder.

The DMCA modified the requirement and framework for the statutory license.

== Criticism ==
While the DPRA expanded the sound recording’s performance right, performers have still criticized the DPRA’s comparative inequity because composers still have a much wider performance right than performers. Broadcast services have criticized the DPRA’s burden on webcasters, since the three-tiered system places a higher burden on the interactive Internet transmission services. Both sides have criticized the convoluted structure of the DPRA.
