= Harry Fox Agency =

Copyright collection society

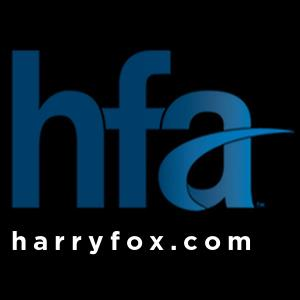
- Abbreviation: HFA
- Formation: 1927; 99 years ago
- Type: Profit
- Headquarters: New York City, United States
- Parent organization: The Blackstone Group
- Website: https://www.harryfox.com/

The Harry Fox Agency (HFA) is a provider of rights management and collector and distributor of mechanical license fees on behalf of music publishers in the United States. HFA has over 48,000 music publishing clients and issues the largest number of licenses for physical and digital formats of music. It was founded in 1927 by the National Music Publishers Association. The agency was sold to performing rights organization SESAC in 2015, which was itself acquired by The Blackstone Group in 2017.

== Services ==
HFA provides the following services to its affiliated publishers:

- Issues mechanical licenses
- Collects and distributes mechanical royalties
- Conducts royalty examinations
- Pursues piracy claims
- Offers rights management services: Slingshot

== Songfile ==
Songfile is an online mechanical licensing tool designed for the D.I.Y. music industry market. It allows the public to search through over millions of songs and purchase licenses. A mechanical license is needed if one wants to manufacture and distribute recordings that they did not write. Through Songfile, licenses can be obtained for physical works, permanent digital downloads (PDDs), ringtones, and interactive streaming distribution. Users pay a per-song processing fee and royalties for licenses, which are set at the current U.S. statutory rate.

== Copyright claims ==
In October 2012, HFA became involved with copyright claims of musical works in the public domain on YouTube. As the designated YouTube administrator for thousands of music publishers, HFA uses the Content Management System (CMS) to review YouTube user disputes for the use of song compositions protected under copyright law. Many arrangements of public domain works are under copyright, even if the original is not, and because the CMS tool is not perfect, some false disputes are created.
