= Mechanical Licensing Collective =

American music rights society

- Type: 501(c)(6) organization
- Industry: Music publishing
- Founded: 2018; 8 years ago
- Headquarters: Nashville, Tennessee
- Area served: United States
- Key people: Kris Ahrend (CEO)
- Website: themlc.com

The Mechanical Licensing Collective (MLC) is a nonprofit organization established under the Music Modernization Act of 2018. It was created to issue blanket mechanical licences for qualified streaming services in the United States, such as Spotify, Apple Music, Amazon Music, and Tidal.

== History ==
In 2020, The MLC announced that four music data companies had joined its Data Quality Initiative (DQI), including: Blokur, Exactuals, Music Data Services, and TuneRegistry. This move was made to ensure the accuracy of their musical works data in its current database.

As of January 2021, the MLC began paying royalties to rights owners. In October 2022, it was reported that the MLC had paid almost $700 million in blanket royalties to songwriters and publishers.

== Funding ==
The digital services that use the MLC have a legal obligation to spend $33.5 million on their start-up costs and $28.5 million on their first-year operating costs.

== Function ==
To resolve the issue of music creators not getting paid for their work, the MLC built a publicly accessible musical works database and portal that creators and music publishers can use to submit and maintain their musical works data. This is so that when their music is played on streaming services, the generated royalties are collected from digital service providers and distributed to the appropriate songwriters, composers, lyricists, and music publishers.

On the 6th December 2023, The MLC announced their Supplemental Matching Network, which initially consists of five companies (Blokur, Jaxsta, Pex, Salt and SX Works, a SoundExchange company) that will provide data matching services to complement and enhance The MLC’s existing matching processes and capabilities.
