= Grand rights =

Grand rights is a type of music licensing, specifically covering the right to perform musical compositions within the context of a dramatic work. This includes stage performances such as musical theater, concert dance, and arrangements of music from a dramatic work.

The license agreements of major performance rights organisations (PROs) such as ASCAP and BMI only cover what are known in contrast as "small rights", and exclude the usage of compositions within "dramatic" or "dramatico-musical" works, or the use of compositions that originated from a dramatico-musical work. Unlike small rights, grand rights must be negotiated directly with the publisher or copyright holder of the composition. Grand rights may also be contrasted with sync licensing, the licensing of music to synchronize with video content in films, videos, videogames, etc.

Prior to the establishment of PROs, license negotiations for any use of a composition were always done directly with publishers or composers. As compositions are licensed more often for non-dramatic performances, it is more efficient to manage these uses collectively. Musician Jack Vees noted that

"it is understandable that a successful composer or publisher would not want to hand over control of negotiating rights if he or she is doing pretty well in that particular arena. In one sense, this division of labor is simply a decision made by a majority of the members of a given performing rights society, because that’s the way they wanted their particular club to work."

Vees also argued that allowing PROs to engage in negotiations for use of compositions in dramatic works could encourage illegal price fixing.
