= Music Modernization Act =

United States copyright law

Orrin G. Hatch–Bob Goodlatte Music Modernization Act
- Long title: To modernize copyright law, and for other purposes.
- Nicknames: Music Modernization Act
- Announced in: the 115th United States Congress
- Sponsored by: Bob Goodlatte
- Number of co-sponsors: 49

Citations
- Public law: Pub. L. 115–264 (text) (PDF)
- Statutes at Large: 132 Stat. 3676

Codification
- Titles affected: 17
- U.S.C. sections affected: 17 U.S.C. § 101 note

Legislative history
- Introduced in the House as H.R. 5447 by Bob Goodlatte (R–VA) on April 10, 2018; Committee consideration by House Judiciary Committee; Passed the House on April 25, 2018 (415-0); Passed the Senate on September 19, 2018 (unanimous); Signed into law by President Donald Trump on October 11, 2018

The Orrin G. Hatch–Bob Goodlatte Music Modernization Act, or Music Modernization Act or MMA (H.R. 1551, Pub. L. 115–264 (text) (PDF)) is United States legislation signed into law on October 11, 2018, aimed to modernize copyright-related issues for music and audio recordings due to new forms of technology such as digital streaming. It is a consolidation of three bills introduced during the 115th United States Congress.

== Enjoined bills ==
The MMA is a combination of three bills previously introduced in Congress. The three bills became the three titles of the final act.

=== Title I: Musical Works Modernization Act ===
The Musical Works Modernization Act (MWMA) is the Act first introduced into the House by Rep. Bob Goodlatte (R-Virginia) on December 17, 2017 (H.R. 4706), and later to the Senate by Sen. Orrin Hatch (R-Utah) on January 24, 2018. Both versions of the bill looked to improve how music licensing and royalties would be paid in consideration of streaming media services. The bill established three major provisions:

1. It would set up a non-profit governing agency that would create a database related to the owners of the mechanical license of musical works - the copyright that covers the music and lyrics of a musical composition; the actual performance and recording is typically held under a different license. This musical works database would be completed with help of the major music publishers. The new agency would establish blanket royalty rates that would be used to pay the composers and lyricists when used by streaming services using this database, eliminating the difficulty previously faced by streaming services to properly identify the mechanical license holder. These royalties would be paid to the non-profit agency as a compulsory license, not requiring the mechanical license holder's permission; the agency would then be responsible for distributing the royalties. Streaming services would still be able to negotiate other royalty rates directly with the mechanical license owner if they so chose.
2. It ensures that composers and lyricists are paid a portion of mechanical license royalties for either physical or digital reproduction of musical compositions, at a rate set by contract.
3. It revamps the rate court process when disagreements over royalty rates arise. Previously, a single judge in the United States District Court for the Southern District of New York was assigned to handle all cases; the bill would assign a random judge in this Court to oversee these cases.

In addition, elements of the "Fair Play Fair Pay Act", H.R. 1836, introduced on March 30, 2017, by Rep. Jerrold Nadler (D-New York, were added to this Title. The Fair Play Fair Pay Act had been designed to harmonize how royalties were paid by terrestrial radio broadcasters and Internet streaming services. Under previous law, songwriters and composers would receive mechanical license royalties for radio play, but the performing artists would not be paid as the use of songs on the radio was considered "promotional". The Fair Play Fair Pay Act had included language that would allow recording artists to receive performance royalties. However, these parts of the Fair Play Fair Pay Act were not included in the combined Music Modernization Act.

=== Title II: CLASSICS Act ===
The Compensating Legacy Artists for their Songs, Service, and Important Contributions to Society (CLASSICS) Act was originally introduced in the House as H.R. 3301 in July 2017. In US copyright law, sound recordings made prior to February 15, 1972, were not covered under federal copyright law, leaving them up to the individual states to pass laws for recording protection. This had created a complex series of laws that made it difficult for copyright enforcement and royalty payments. The CLASSICS Act established that sound recordings before 1972 are covered by copyright until February 15, 2067, with additional language to grandfather older recordings into the public domain at an earlier time.

Recordings prior to 1923 entered the public domain three years from passage, which equated to January 1, 2022. Recordings from 1923 to 1946 will enter the public domain on January 1 the year after they turn 100 years old. For example, a work published on June 1, 1925, will enter the public domain on January 1, 2026. Every January 1 following 2022, works will enter the public domain until the final date occurring on January 1, 2047. Following a 10-year break, recordings from 1947 to 1956 will enter the public domain every year until the final date occurring on January 1, 2067. All recordings from 1957 to February 14, 1972, will be protected until February 15, 2067.

=== Title III: Allocation for Music Producers Act ===
The Allocation for Music Producers (AMP) Act was introduced by Rep. Joseph Crowley (D-New York) on February 6, 2017 as H.R. 881. The bill designates that SoundExchange, the non-profit organization established by Congress to distribute royalties on sound recordings, will also distribute part of those royalties to "a producer, mixer, or sound engineer who was part of the creative process that created [the] sound recording".

== Lobbying from the recording industry ==
On April 1, 2014, Neil Portnow, the president and CEO of The Recording Academy, began calling for the music industry to combine lobbying efforts with the goal of passing new legislation and regulatory reform. The following day he gave a speech to lawmakers at Grammys on the Hill calling for unity legislation. On June 10, 2014, Portnow testified before the House Judiciary Subcommittee on Courts, Intellectual Property, and the Internet. On January 8, 2018, representatives from numerous sections of the music industry united to join The Recording Academy's push for comprehensive music reform, including RIAA, NMPA, NSAI, and ASCAP.

== Passage ==
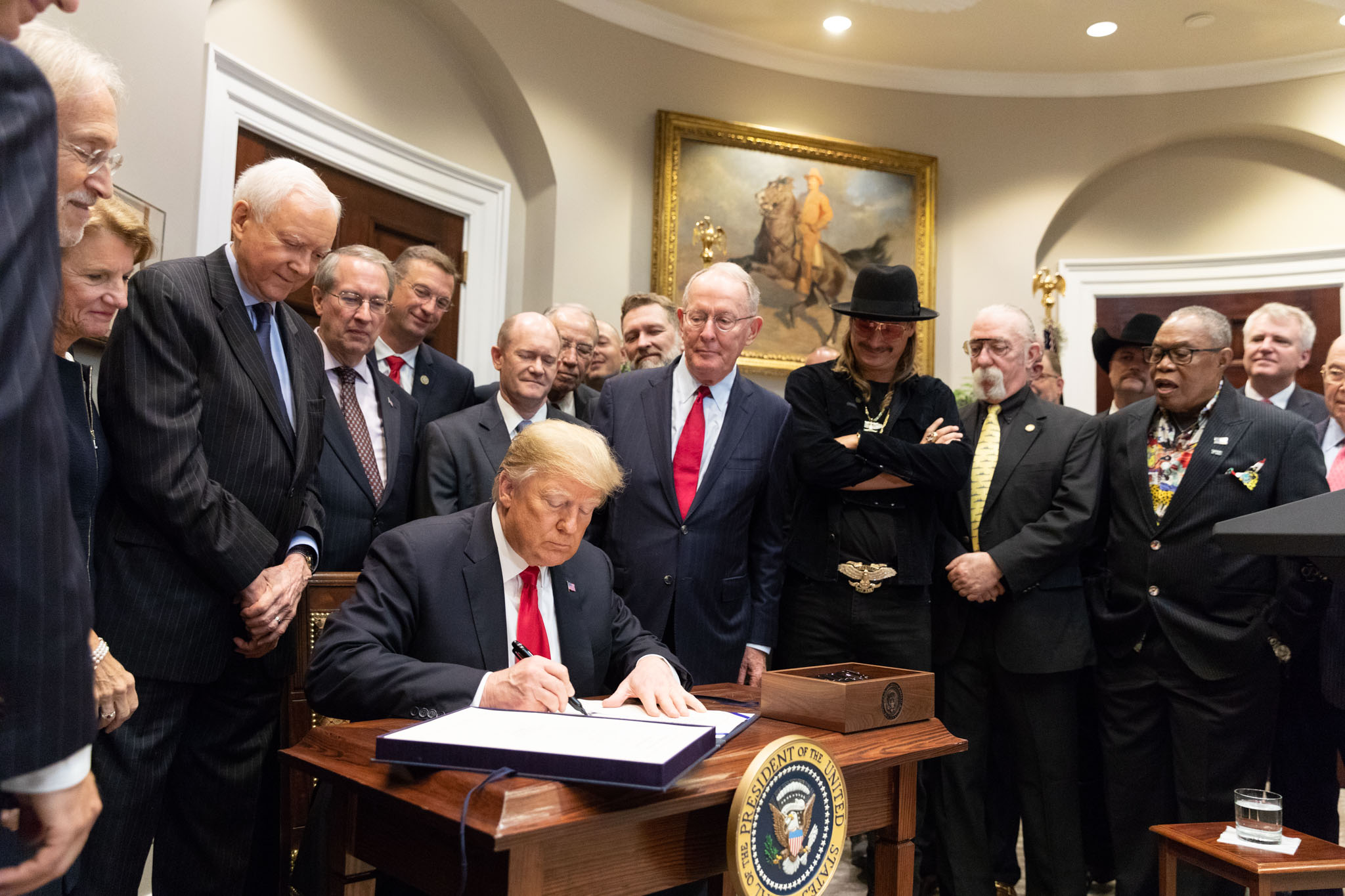
President Donald Trump signs the act on October 11, 2018.

The three bills were consolidated in the House by Goodlatte on April 10, 2018, as H.R. 5447 , which passed the bill on April 25, 2018. Hatch introduced the combined bill in the Senate as S. 2823 on May 10, 2018. During the Senate's review, the body voted to move the bill to an existing, unrelated bill, H.R. 1551, which the House agreed to. The Senate voted in favor of the bill on September 19, 2018, and was subsequently signed into law by President Donald Trump on October 11, 2018. Among those in attendance at the signing were musicians Kid Rock, Mike Love, Sam Moore, John Rich, Craig Morgan, and Jeff Baxter, and the Christian band MercyMe. While Kanye West had been reported to be attending the signing, he was not present, although he had a luncheon with Trump later that day.

== Reactions ==
The bills in both House and Senate had bipartisan support, as well as strong support from numerous music industry groups representing musicians, producers, and publishers, as well as from digital streaming media services and related industry groups. Digital streaming platforms Apple Music and Spotify had both come under prior separate legal actions for unpaid royalties for streaming music in part due to a lack of a central database with which to track down songwriters and composers, and had even set aside part of their working capital to deal with legal issues in order to offer full music catalogs, in contrast to Amazon.com's music selection.

There was a last-minute conflict in the Senate, brought up by SESAC and SiriusXM, relating to royalties for pre-1972 sound recordings, but a deal was made between SiriusXM, the National Music Publishers Association and the Recording Industry Association of America which allowed the bill to be passed by the Senate by a unanimous vote, allowing the bill to quickly pass through Congress via "hotlining" before the end of the session.

When the House MMA bill was introduced in December 2017, it included a provision that liabilities for streaming companies would be limited to infractions after January 1, 2018, a clause that remained through the final passed bill. On December 31, 2017, Wixen Music Publishing, representing artists like Tom Petty and Neil Young, filed a lawsuit against Spotify to seek unpaid royalties for their artists' songs, asking for US$1.6 billion in damages. The suit was filed to be able to recover damages for infractions that occurred before the MMA's January 1, 2018 date. This suit was ultimately settled out of court by December 2018 for an undisclosed sum.

The Internet Archive opposed an earlier version of the bill. After it passed, they used a provision allowing libraries to offer recordings that are not commercially available, to digitize and offer public downloads of some long-playing records that are not commercially available.

In 2021, in response to the MMA, the Mechanical Licensing Collective began paying out unmatched mechanical royalties to songwriters and their publishers.

== Legal challenges ==
One of the first high-profile legal challenges to the MMA was raised in a lawsuit from Eminem's publisher Eight Mile Style against Spotify, asserting that Spotify has allowed Eminem's music to be streamed without paying the proper royalties, as the service lists some of these works under "Copyright control" with no known owner. While the suit's primary complaint is with Spotify, the suit further argued that part of the law, limiting liabilities to those after January 1, 2018, was unconstitutional since it provides no proper compensation for the work that was taken from the publisher, against the Takings Clause of the Fifth Amendment.
