= Compulsory license =

Legal nonconsensual paid copyright or patent use

A compulsory license provides that the owner of a patent or copyright licenses the use of their rights against payment either set by law or determined through some form of adjudication or arbitration. In essence, under a compulsory license, an individual or company seeking to use another's intellectual property can do so without seeking the rights holder's consent, and pays the rights holder a set fee for the license. This is an exception to the general rule under intellectual property laws that the intellectual property owner enjoys exclusive rights that it may license—or decline to license—to others.

Under UK patent law, a compulsory license is different from a statutory license. Under statutory license, the rate is fixed by law, whereas in case of compulsory license, the rate is left to be negotiated or decided in court.

== Copyright law ==
In a number of countries, copyright law provides for compulsory licenses of copyrighted works for specific uses. In many cases the remuneration or royalties received for a copyrighted work under compulsory license are specified by local law, but may also be subject to negotiation. Compulsory licensing may be established through negotiating licenses that provide terms within the parameters of the compulsory license. Essentially compulsory licensing provide that copyright owners may only exercise the exclusive rights granted to them under copyright law in a certain way and through a certain system.

=== Berne Convention ===
Article 11bis(2) and Article 13(1) of the Berne Convention for the Protection of Literary and Artistic Works provide the legal basis for compulsory licensing at the international level. They specify under which conditions members to the Berne Convention may determine or impose conditions under which exclusive rights may be exercised, for example through compulsory licensing. The Berne Convention states that member states are free to determine the conditions under which certain exclusive rights may be exercised in their national laws. They also provide for the minimum requirements to be set when compulsory licenses are applied, such as that they must not prejudice the author's right to fair compensation.

Article 11bis(2) states that:

It shall be a matter for legislation in the country of the Union to determine the conditions under which the rights mentioned in the preceding paragraph may be exercised, but these conditions shall apply only in the countries where they have been prescribed. They shall not in any circumstances be prejudicial to the moral rights of the author, nor to his right to obtain equitable remuneration which, in the absence of agreement, shall be fixed by competent authority.

The "preceding article" mentioned in Article 11bis(2) is Article 11bis(1), which establishes that:

Authors of literary and artistic works shall enjoy the exclusive right of authorising: (i) the broadcasting of their works or the communication thereof to the public by any other means of wireless diffusion of signs, sounds or images; (ii) any communication to the public by wire or by rebroadcasting of the broadcast of the work, when this communication is made by an organisation other than the original one; (iii) the public communication by loudspeaker or any other analogous instrument transmitting, by signs, sounds or images, the broadcast of the work.

Article 13(1) states that:

Each country of the Union may impose for itself reservations and conditions on the exclusive right granted to the author of a music work and to the author of any words, the recording of which together with the music work has already been authorised by the latter, to authorise the sound recording of that musical work, together with such words, if any; but all such reservations and conditions shall apply only in the countries which have imposed them and shall not, in any circumstances, be prejudicial to the rights of these authors to obtain equitable remuneration which, in the absence of agreement, shall be fixed by competent authority.

In addition to the exclusive rights mentioned in Article 11bis(1) and 13(1) the Berne Convention also provides that members may determine or impose such conditions for the exercise of exclusive rights in cases where an exclusive right is not provided as remuneration right and not as an exclusive right of authorisation, for example in the case of the resale right, or droit de suite (Article 14ter), and the so-called "Article 12 rights" of performers and producers of phonograms. Members to the Berne Convention may also determine or impose such conditions where the restriction of an exclusive right to the mere right to remuneration is allowed, for example the right to reproduction (Article 9(2)), and in the case of "residual rights", that is, a right to remuneration, usually for authors or performers, that survives the transfer of certain exclusive rights.

=== United States ===
There are several different compulsory license provisions in United States copyright law, including for non-dramatic musical compositions, public broadcasting, retransmission by cable systems, subscription digital audio transmission, and non-subscription digital audio transmission such as Internet radio. The compulsory license for non-dramatic musical compositions under Section 115 of the Copyright Act of 1976 allows a person to distribute a new sound recording of a musical work, if that has been previously distributed to the public, by or under the authority of the copyright owner. There is no requirement that the new recording be identical to the previous work, as the compulsory license includes the privilege of rearranging the work to conform it to the recording artist's interpretation. This does not allow the artist to change the basic melody or fundamental character of the work. In order to take advantage of this compulsory license the recording artist must provide notice and pay a royalty. The notice must be sent to the copyright owner, or if unable to determine the copyright owner, to the Copyright Office, within thirty days of making the recording, but before distributing physical copies. Failure to provide this notice would constitute copyright infringement. In addition to the notice to the copyright owner, the recording artist must pay a royalty to the copyright owner. This royalty is set by three copyright royalty judges. Though the compulsory license allows one to make and distribute physical copies of a song for a set royalty, the owner of the copyright in the underlying musical composition can still control public performance of the work or transmission over the radio. If the underlying musical work is well known, the work can be licensed for public performance through a performance rights organization such as ASCAP, BMI, or SESAC.

According to Register of Copyrights Marybeth Peters, use of the section 115 license prior to the 1995 enactment of the Digital Performance Right in Sound Recordings Act was extremely rare, with the U.S. Copyright Office receiving fewer than 20 notices of such licenses per year. By 2003, that number had risen to 214, which, while higher, was not considered by the Register to be significant.

== Patents ==
Many patent law systems provide for the granting of compulsory licenses in a variety of situations. The Paris Convention of 1883 provides that each contracting State may take legislative measures for the grant of compulsory licenses. Article 5A.(2) of the Paris Convention reads:

Each country of the Union shall have the right to take legislative measures providing for the grant of compulsory licenses to prevent the abuses which might result from the exercise of the exclusive rights conferred by the patent, for example, failure to work. (See also Article 5A.(3) to (5) of the Paris Convention.)

According to historian Adrian Johns, the idea of compulsory licensing "seems to have originated as a serious proposition in the 1830s, although predecessors can be traced back into the eighteenth century," and it was popular in the British anti-patent movement of the 1850s and 1860s. More recently an area of fierce debate has been that of drugs for treating serious diseases such as malaria, HIV and AIDS. Such drugs are widely available in the western world and would help to manage the epidemic of these diseases in developing countries. However, such drugs are too expensive for developing countries and generally protected by patents.

=== United States ===
In the United States, if the federal government or one of its contractors infringes a patent, the only remedy available to patent holders is a lawsuit in the Court of Federal Claims. It is the policy of the U.S. Department of Defense to allow contractors to infringe patents and to defend the contractor against patent infringement claims at government expense. Use of this provision by agencies other than Department of Defense is rare. During the 2001 anthrax attacks through the US Postal Service, the US government threatened to issue a compulsory license for the antibiotic drug ciprofloxacin, if the patent owner, Bayer, didn't lower the price to the government. Bayer lowered the price and the government backed down on the threat.

=== India ===
In India, compulsory license may be issued by the Controller General of Patents, Designs and Trade Marks under section 84(1) of The Patents Act, 1970, if:

1. The reasonable requirements of the public with respect to the patented invention have not been satisfied, or,
2. the patented invention is not available to the public at a reasonably affordable price, or,
3. the patented invention is not worked in the territory of India.

In March 2012, India granted its first compulsory license ever to Indian generic drug manufacturer Natco Pharma for Sorafenib tosylate, a cancer drug patented by Bayer.

=== South Africa ===
In November 2025, HIV patient advocates called on the South African government to issue a compulsory license for a new HIV prevention medicine called lenacapavir after the Trump administration left South Africa out of a donation program for low-income countries. They warn that excluding South Africa will undermine both the country's HIV prevention efforts and the World Health Organization's goal of ending HIV as a public health threat by 2030, stressing that any serious access plan must include South Africa. Their demands follow a U.S. State Department announcement that 1,000 doses of the Gilead Sciences drug were recently shipped to Zambia and Eswatini as the first deliveries in a Global Fund distribution initiative announced late last year.

== Agreement on Trade-Related Aspects of Intellectual Property Rights (TRIPs) ==
The Agreement on Trade-Related Aspects of Intellectual Property Rights (TRIPs) also sets out specific provisions that shall be followed if a compulsory license is issued, and the requirements of such licenses. The TRIPS compulsory licensing framework was originally enshrined in its entirety within Article 31. The key tenets of Article 31 have been summarized as follows:

"First, compulsory licenses can only be granted by governmental bodies, although no restrictions are imposed on their nature, composition, or function (Article 31(a)). Second, each compulsory license application must be considered “on its individual merits.”180 This does not preclude WTO members from enacting laws that establish presumptions in favor of issuing compulsory licenses, but it does exclude “blanket” grants (Article 31(a)). Third, the lawful award of a compulsory license is conditional on the prospective licensee having first undertaken “efforts” to obtain a consensual license from the patentee on “reasonable commercial terms and conditions,” and that such efforts were not “successful within a reasonable period of time.” This requirement does not apply in “circumstances of extreme urgency” or for “public non-commercial use,” though the issuing WTO member must notify the patent holder of such compulsory licenses without delay (Article 31(b)). Fourth, any governmental act awarding a compulsory license must specify its scope and duration, and such limitations must legally bind the licensee (Article 31(c)). Fifth, WTO members can only issue compulsory licenses that are nonexclusive and nonassignable (Article 31(d)-(e)). Sixth, article 31(f) specifies that compulsory licenses must be “authorized predominantly for the supply of the domestic market” of the issuing country. Notably, this provision does not impose a methodology for quantifying such predominance, allowing WTO members to choose their own measuring parameters. Nevertheless, the elasticity of the word “predominantly” is not boundless, making the substance of this restriction unequivocal (Article 31(f)). Seventh, WTO members must confer an “adequate remuneration” to patent holders that are subject to compulsory licenses, based on the relevant circumstances and the economic value of the protected invention (Article 31(h)). Eighth, consistently with the rule of law principle permeating the entirety of TRIPS, WTO members must ensure that patentees have a right to judicially challenge both the issuance of a compulsory license and the amount of compensation received (Article 38(i)-(j)."

All major national patent systems comply with the TRIPs. At national lever, examples of situations in which compulsory license may be granted include lack of working over an extended period in the territory of the patent, inventions funded by the government, failure or inability of a patentee to meet a demand for a patented product and where the refusal to grant a license leads to the inability to exploit an important technological advance, or to exploit a further patent.

Article 31 has been highly divisive. Some Commentators have posited that it unjustifiably hinders WTO members’ sovereign prerogatives to issue compulsory licenses to pursue public policy objectives and remedy abusive conduct by entrenching impregnable safeguards for patentees. However, other commentators have suggested that the Article 31 "regime is built on the premise that WTO members may subject any patent, including patents on pharmaceuticals, to a compulsory license, regardless of the nature of the invention or whether it covers a product or a process at any moment in time during their protection term. Article 31 does not curtail the grounds on which a WTO member may issue compulsory licenses, nor does it dictate minimum substantive or evidentiary thresholds for such grants. Furthermore, all procedural and substantive protections for patentees mandated by this provision are built around broad and general standards, such as “reasonable commercial terms and conditions,” “circumstances of extreme urgency,” “purpose,” and “adequate remuneration,” that afford ample flexibility in their implementation. In our view, article 31 unequivocally enshrines into international intellectual property law the principle that compulsory licenses are a highly adaptable instrument that countries are free to tailor as broadly or narrowly as they deem appropriate for their domestic socioeconomic milieu. It is this ample discretion that constitutes the normative core of the TRIPS compulsory licensing regime, not the relatively narrow safeguards that it affords to patentees."

=== Doha Declaration ===
At the 2001 Fourth Ministerial Conference in Doha, bolstered by swelling support from scholars and activists, a group of WTO members submitted a proposal to fundamentally reform articles 27 and 31 of TRIPS. Though this initiative was resisted by developed WTO members, it laid the ground for the unanimous adoption of the WTO Declaration on the TRIPS Agreement and Public Health the “Doha Declaration”. The opening paragraphs of the Doha Declaration recognized the importance of patent protection for medical inventions but coextensively acknowledged “concerns about its effects on prices.” (“We recognize that intellectual property protection is important for the development of new medicines. We also recognize the concerns about its effects on prices.” Doha Declaration ¶ 3). This was followed by a statement reaffirming the sovereign prerogative of WTO members to grant compulsory licenses and their “freedom to determine the grounds” on which they are issued. (Doha Declaration ¶ 5) Expressing the key concern of the Doha Declaration, paragraph 6 accepted the difficulties faced by countries with insufficient pharmaceutical manufacturing capabilities in “making effective use of compulsory licensing under the TRIPS Agreement,” and it instructed the Council for TRIPS to develop an “expeditious solution.” (Expressing the key concern of the Doha Declaration, paragraph 6 accepted the difficulties faced by countries with insufficient pharmaceutical manufacturing capabilities in “making effective use of compulsory licensing under the TRIPS Agreement,” and it instructed the Council for TRIPS to develop an “expeditious solution.”). This was an explicit admission that the original TRIPS framework was flawed.

In 2003, after two years of contentious negotiations,217 the TRIPS Council adopted the Implementation of Paragraph 6 of the Doha Declaration on the TRIPS Agreement and Public Health [the “Waiver Decision”], under which it instituted a temporary “waiver” allowing WTO members to grant compulsory licenses free from the obligations imposed by articles 31(f) and 31(h) (General Council Decision, Implementation of Paragraph 6 of the Doha Declaration on the TRIPS Agreement and Public Health, WTO Doc. WT/L/540). In 2005, the WTO's General Council adopted the Protocol Amending the TRIPS Agreement (the “Amendment Protocol”), which incorporated the substance of the Waiver Decision into TRIPS via the addition of article 31bis, its annex, and the appendix to the annex [the “Article 31bis System”] (General Council Decision, Amendment of the TRIPS Agreement, WTO Doc. WT/L/641 (Dec. 6, 2005)). The Amendment Protocol entered into force in 2017 after ratification by two-thirds of WTO members.

On 17 May 2006 the European Commission's official journal published Regulation 816/2006, which brings into force the provisions of the Doha Declaration. This means that the declaration now has legal effect in the European Union, and also in Canada who implemented it in 2005.

Article 31bis compulsory licensing has been described as follows:

“The Article 31bis System allows a WTO member with “insufficient or no manufacturing capacities in the pharmaceutical sector” (the “Importing State”) to import patented “pharmaceutical products” produced under a special export compulsory license granted by another WTO member (the “Exporting State”). Procedurally, this mechanism is structured as a dialogical interaction between an Importing State and an Exporting State. At the outset, the Importing State must send a notice to the TRIPS Council. This notice document is not subject to approval but must contain determinate information, including the pharmaceutical product(s) that will be imported and the “expected quantity” required. Moreover, unless the Importing State is an LDC, it must self-certify its lack of capabilities to produce the drug in question domestically and confirm that it has granted, or intends to grant, a compulsory license in accordance with article 31 for the patented pharmaceutical product in question. Once the TRIPS Council has received the Importing State’s notification, the Exporting State can issue an export compulsory license that must still conform with article 31 but which, crucially, is exempt from article 31(f) “to the extent necessary for the purposes of production of a pharmaceutical product(s) and its export to an eligible importing Member(s).” The terms of this compulsory license must bind the licensee both to manufacture the patented pharmaceuticals in a quantity no greater than that notified to the TRIPS Council and to export all of them to the Importing State. Additionally, these products must be clearly identifiable “through specific labelling or marking,” as well as distinguishable through special “packaging and/or colouring/shaping of the products themselves.” The Exporting State must also promptly notify the TRIPS Council that it has issued the export compulsory license and provide its terms. Prior to shipment, the licensee must create a website through which it discloses the exact quantities of pharmaceuticals supplied to the Importing State and the markings that render them distinguishable. The Exporting State is required to pay compensation to the patent holder, “taking into account the economic value to the importing Member of the use that has been authorized in the exporting Member.” Notably, a WTO member is eligible to be an Importing State only if it has notified the TRIPS Council of its intention to use the Article 31bis System. At the time of writing, thirty-seven developed WTO members have elected either not to rely on export compulsory licenses or to only rely on them in circumstances of extreme urgency. These opt-outs were expressed when the Amendment Protocol was adopted, almost as an informal political pact among technologically advanced countries not to encroach on pharmaceutical patentees’ rights. Ironically, the COVID-19 pandemic has exposed the short-sightedness of this accord. As several developed WTO members began to confront the inadequacy of their mRNA vaccine production capabilities and struggle to secure sufficient supplies to protect their populations, sensitivity toward the plight of patentees appears to have suddenly diminished.”

== See also ==
- Agreement on Trade-Related Aspects of Intellectual Property Rights
- Canada's Access to Medicines Regime
- Copyright collective
- Extended collective licensing
- Doha Declaration
- Intellectual property
- Mechanical license
- Open Music Model
- Orphaned Works
- Pharmaceutical company
- Right to property
- Webcasting
- Section 115 Reform Act of 2006 (United States)
