= Music licensing =

Licensed use of copyrighted music

Music licensing is the licensed use of copyrighted music. Music licensing is intended to ensure that the owners of copyrights on musical works are compensated for certain uses of their work. A purchaser has limited rights to use the work without a separate agreement.

== Definitions ==
The following words and phrases appear in discussion of music licensing:

license
the right, granted by the copyright holder or his/her agent, for the broadcast, recreation, or performance of a copyrighted work. Types of licensing contracts can include: 1) a flat fee for a defined period of usage, or 2) royalty payments determined by the number of copies of the work sold or the total revenues acquired as a result of its distribution. In addition to a basic fee, most music licensing agreements require additional payments to the copyright owner when the work in which it is included (movie, play) is financially successful above a certain threshold.
licensor
the owner of the licensed work
licensee
the person or entity to whom the work is licensed
performance
the public performance of a musical piece, whether live or recorded, performed by the original artist or someone else, whether the performance keeps to the original version or is adapted or changed in some manner. Playing a music CD (or tape, etc.) in public is "performing" the work.
broadcast
playing live or recorded works, including radio, television, webcasting, podcasting, etc., to several listeners in a setting such as a bar or bookstore. (Using that definition and the previous one leads to phrases like 'live broadcast performance'.)
performing rights organization
large companies that hold performance rights for copyrighted musical works. The best-known are American Society of Composers, Authors and Publishers (ASCAP), Broadcast Music Incorporated (BMI), Society of European Stage Authors and Composers (SESAC), and La Asociación de Compositores y Editores de Música Latinoamericana (The Association of Composers and Publishers of Latin American Music, ACEMLA), In the United Kingdom, the PRS for Music, and Phonographic Performance Limited for licensing recordings and music videos. The companies license public performance on a nonexclusive basis of the music they own or hold under contract using a complex weighting formula to distribute the fees to the respective rights holders. The license may be a blanket license, but individual licenses may be negotiated.

Rights organizations sample radio and television broadcasts, offer blanket licenses to broadcasters, and investigate complaints to detect and prevent unauthorized performances.

In the U.S., ASCAP and BMI hire field agents to monitor public performances. The field agents may act as agents for the organization, negotiating a fee for a blanket license, but individuals may negotiate directly with the organization. The fee may be presented on a take-it-or-leave-it basis, but in case of disagreement, the fee may be appealed to the Federal District Court in the Southern District of New York.

pre-cleared music
music that is covered under a prior agreement allowing distribution and legal use under specific circumstances. The license may be for use in film, video, television (commercials and programs), Internet, events in live venues, video games and multimedia productions.
copyright
literally, 'the right to copy.' Under U.S. law, copyright owners have six categories of exclusive rights: reproduction, preparation of derivative works, distribution, public performance, public display, and, for sound recordings, public performance by means of digital audio transmission. Prior to 1886, no effective international law of copyright existed. The first major international copyright law conventions were the Berne Convention for the Protection of Literary and Artistic Works created in 1886. In the U.S., for works created in 1977 and after the work is protected by copyright when it is "fixed in any tangible medium of expression," without the need to register it with the US Copyright Office. A work must be registered, however, before a copyright owner may bring suit for infringement.
royalty free music
Royalty free music is music licensed for use without requiring royalties for each permitted use. A royalty free license may require an initial payment, and the music generally remains protected by copyright. The permitted uses and any restrictions depend on the license agreement.
synchronization licensing
the licensing of musical works to be synchronized with moving pictures as background in a motion picture, television program, video, DVD, etc.
master use licensing
the licensing of the recording of a musical work to be performed as a soundtrack, bumper, lead-in or background to a motion picture.
publisher
for the purposes of copyright, a publisher is the owner of the copyrighted work. It is now standard practice for songwriters of even the slightest prominence to form a publishing company as a separate legal entity to hold the rights to their work. Continued use of the, now somewhat anachronistic, term "publisher" reflects the state of media at the time of the Berne Convention, when all music distribution was done on paper as sheet music or player piano rolls.

== Broadcasting ==
Broadcasting, in the context of music licensing, means the playback of recorded or live music for groups of people beyond what might be normally expected in a social setting. Legal claims are filed frequently against bookstores, bars, and live music venues that broadcast music without first obtaining a performance license.

The music broadcast in grocery stores and elevators is a service purchased from one of many organizations that offer it (the largest is Muzak). Part of the fee paid for the service is used to cover licensing costs. Except in very narrowly defined circumstances, noted below under the "small business exception" in 17 USC 110, a business, restaurant, or store that plays radio broadcasts or shows television programs in the premises does not pay a licensing fee.

Radio stations pay fees to licensing bodies for nonexclusive rights to broadcast music. Radio stations and businesses typically pay a flat rate once a year, called a blanket license, which can vary based on the size of the audience, value of the advertising revenues, and amount and nature of music usage. As part of the license contract a radio station may conduct periodic audits of the music being played, with the audit results submitted to the licensing bulk.

Broadcasting pre-recorded music at live events at outlets larger than stores or restaurants, such as stadiums, arenas, or parks, is covered under United States Copyright Law through a "blanket license" that obtained from one of the performing rights organization (PRO), such as BMI or ASCAP. These are compulsory licenses that are held by the PROs, and typically offered based on a per-attendee cost per song, paid to the PRO, which then distributes the royalties to the artists.

In 2012, both BMI and ASCAP introduced a new type of blanket license for political-based events such as campaign rallies called a "Political Entities License". While similar to the blanket license for broadcast of pre-recorded music at large public events, it gives the artists the ability to disallow the use of their music for specific political functions.

== Home media ==
Licensing issues are encountered when TV shows or films using copyrighted music are released on both DVD and streaming formats.

When a song is cleared for usage on a TV show, historically to save money, the clearance typically applies only to TV airings of the show in question. Thus, when the show is considered for DVD distribution to the home video market, the rights to the song must be renegotiated in order for the song in question to be included on the DVD. Most producers/production companies now include the rights for DVDs or "all media now known or hereafter devised," which assures production companies of the right to re-release without incurring additional licensing fees.

If the process of clearing the rights to the song is prohibitively expensive for the home video distributor, or clearance is rejected by the copyright holders of the original song, the affected song is either replaced with a similar one (such as a rerecording or a generic soundalike), or the footage containing the copyrighted song is edited out. In a few cases, TV shows, with extensive use of copyrighted music whose cost of "after-market" licensing is high, are withheld from release on DVD; notable examples include The Wonder Years, Murphy Brown, Happy Days, WKRP in Cincinnati, Third Watch (beyond its first two seasons), Cold Case, Popular and MTV's Daria, some of which were eventually released after long delays. Sony Pictures Home Entertainment cancelled the planned October 2007 DVD release of Dark Skies for that reason, but it was finally released on January 18, 2011 (4 years later) through Shout! Factory.

== Live performance ==
Live public performances of musical works are typically licensed in the United States, as "public performances" is one of the six "exclusive rights" listed in 17 USC 106. In the U.S., the owner of a bar, cafe, or restaurant who wants to have live music played in their establishment, commonly obtains a blanket license from ASCAP & BMI to play copyright music listed in their catalogues. Because ASCAP, BMI, Pro Music Rights, and SESAC have non-overlapping collections, a license from one entity does not provide a license to play music from the other entities.

The Association for Concert Bands (ACB) offers a blanket license to community bands that covers both ASCAP and BMI lists. At the end of the year, a community band completes a spreadsheet showing how often each song was played during the year, which the ACB submits to the rights organizations.

Public performances of works in the context of dramatic works are separately licensed; these licenses are called "grand rights".

== Performance Licensing ==
In general, someone who plans to perform a piece of music publicly will obtain a "public performance" license from the rightsholder (often the music publisher). Purchasing a copy of the sheet music does not itself usually provide public performance rights.

Developing one's own arrangement of the music is considered a derivative work, which would ordinarily require a separate license. The derivative work is itself copyrighted, but if the original work is under copyright, then permission of both the composition's rightsholder and of the arrangement's rightsholder is needed before performance, distribution, or recording is planned. An arrangement of a traditional song or piece of music will be protected by copyright even if the original piece is in the public domain. For instance, ASCAP has over 40 arrangements of Beethoven's "Moonlight Sonata" under license, and nearly 80 versions of Row, Row, Row Your Boat.

In the United States, limitations and exceptions to performance rights include fair use and the performances described under Section 110 of the US copyright statute The fair use limitation defines uses that are not "infringements", based on consideration of factors such as how the original work was used, the nature of the original work, how much of it was used, and if the original rightsholder suffered economic harm.

In spite of folk wisdom to the contrary, there is no "three second rule" for copying or sampling recorded music. There is no rule that "four notes" can be copied without penalty. Instances under the fair use exception might include criticism or comment. Criticism need not be negative: if a jazz soloist quotes a phrase from a well-known solo by another player, it might be viewed as an homage. Music sampling has been aggressively pursued by copyright holders as a form of "free riding" but might be interpreted as a transformative use.

=== Section 110 exemptions ===
Section 110 sets out eleven situations in which performance of a work, including broadcast, "are not infringements of copyright" The major exemptions are outlined in paragraphs 1 to 5. Paragraphs 1 and 2 cover face-to-face instruction, or "distance learning," in non-profit educational settings. Paragraph 3 applies to performance or display in religious settings as part of a worship service. Paragraph 4 applies to non-dramatic literary or musical works (but not plays or video) performed by non-profit groups such as a community band or orchestra. Paragraph 5 is the "small business" exemption.

A performance license need not be obtained if the work is performed or displayed "by instructors or pupils in the course of face-to-face teaching activities of a nonprofit educational institution."

A film shown as part of a fundraiser, or a film series might not qualify as "face-to-face teaching activities." Instruction given to corporate or government employees would not qualify as a "nonprofit educational institution."

Paragraph 2 creates a similar exemption for distance learning. A work may be performed or displayed through transmission to students enrolled in a course, or to government employees as part of their duties, without requiring a performance license. The exemption does not apply to works produced and sold for online distance learning. The performance or display must be made under the direction of the instructor and directly related to, and in aid of, what is being taught: it cannot be used as a pretext for transmission of other works. Nondramatic literary or musical works may be performed in their entirety. For other works, such as display of a film or painting, the performance must be "reasonable and limited." The exemption applies only to distance learning that is part of scheduled classes. Works that are simply posted by an instructor would not be protected. The educational institution must meet certain additional conditions. It must provide information to faculty, students, and relevant staff members describing US copyright law and promoting compliance. For digital transmissions, the institution must take reasonable steps to prevent unauthorized retention or further distribution of copies of the work such as not interfering with any technological means the copyright owner may have used to prevent copying.

Paragraph 3 creates an exemption for performance of nondramatic literary works, musical works, or dramatico-musical works of a religious nature, or display of a work, as part of religious services at a place of worship or religious assembly.

Section 110 (4) creates an exemption for non-profit groups for performance of a nondramatic literary or musical work (but not a play or an opera) if four conditions are met: 1) the work may be performed but may not be transmitted to the public, 2) none of the performers, organizers, or promoters are paid, 3) there is no direct or indirect commercial advantage, and, 4) there is no admission charge, or, after deducting for reasonable expenses the proceeds are used exclusively for educational, religious, or charitable purposes. The last condition may not be met if the copyright owner has objected by serving written notice to the performing organization which conforms to requirements outlined in the statute. A performance by a non-profit may be recorded and the recording may be privately shared. But posting the recording on a public service such as YouTube constitutes "transmission" within the terms of the statute. The recording is "transmitted" when it is posted, whether or not anyone ever plays it. This is not a trivial consideration. Popular cell phone apps, such as Shazam, and other readily available programs make it possible to automate identification of music posted on public sites.

Paragraph 5 is the "small business exemption," which allows bars, cafes, and restaurants to play the radio or show television programming as "background" in their business. It does not authorize playing recorded music such as using a CD player, or live musical performances. The exemption covers reception of a public transmission on a single receiving apparatus of a kind commonly used in the home if no direct charge is made and the performance is not further transmitted to the public. Very specific limitations are outlined in the statute, such as number of loudspeakers permitted and square footage of the establishment.

A governmental body, or a nonprofit agricultural or horticultural organization, may perform nondramatic musical works in the course of an annual agricultural or horticultural fair without obtaining a performance license.

A public vending establishment may perform nondramatic musical works to promote the sale of copies of the work if there is no admission charge. The performance may not be transmitted beyond the immediate area the sale occurs.

A nondramatic literary work may be performed or transmitted to blind persons or other handicapped persons who are unable to read normal printed material, or to deaf or other handicapped persons who are unable to hear the aural signals accompanying a transmission of visual signals if the performance is made without any purpose of direct or indirect commercial advantage and the transmission is made through the facilities of a governmental body, a non-commercial educational broadcast station, a "subcarrier" of an FM broadcast station or a cable system.

A single performance of a dramatic literary work may be transmitted specifically for the blind or other handicapped persons if the work was published at least 10 years before the date of the performance, there is no direct or indirect commercial advantage, and the transmission is made through an FM radio subcarrier as defined in paragraph 8.

The performance of a nondramatic literary or musical work in the course of a social function organized and promoted by a nonprofit veterans’ organization or a nonprofit fraternal organization is exempt. Social functions of college or university sororities or fraternities are not included under the exemption unless the social function is held solely to raise funds for a specific charitable purpose.

Paragraph 11 permits muting or skipping limited portions of the audio or video portions of a motion picture which is transmitted to a household for private viewing. Creating or providing a computer program which facilitates muting or skipping is also permitted, provided no alteration is made in the content, and provided no fixed copy of the altered version is created.

== Highly publicized music licensing incidents ==
=== "Happy Birthday to You" ===
The song "Happy Birthday to You" is one of the best known songs in the world and generated over $2 million in royalties each year for Warner/Chappell Music, until September 2015, when a U.S. judge ruled that Warner/Chappell Music could not prove that it held a copyright to the song. On February 8, 2016, Warner/Chappell Music agreed to settle a class action lawsuit brought to challenge these fees. After mediation, Warner's payments would total more than $14 million to the "thousands of people and entities" who had paid licensing fees to use the song since 1949, plus $4.6 million to attorneys for the plaintiffs.

=== ASCAP and Girl Scouts ===
In 1995, the ASCAP (the American Society of Composers, Authors, and Publishers) ordered The American Camping Association to pay royalties for campfire songs sung at any of their 2300 camps, including popular singalong songs "Puff the Magic Dragon" and "This Land Is Your Land". ("This Land Is Your Land" was later determined to have been in the public domain since 1973.) Girl Scout camps were included in the request, but only a small number of Girl Scout camps actually paid the $250 agreed upon yearly fee. The New York Times reported, "Among the 256 Girl Scout camps on its list, 16 [paid]." In March 1996, ASCAP sent letters to the Girl Scouts to pay copyright fees for campfire songs written or published by ASCAP sung in "public performance." ASCAP expected to be paid license fees for any of the 4 million songs included list sung publicly.

In August 1996, The Wall Street Journal published a frontpage article, "Ascap Cautions the Girl Scouts: Don't Sing 'God Bless America,'" describing the scene at Diablo Day Camp in Lafayette, California, as a troop of Girl Scouts danced to the Macarena in silence for fear of copyright infringement. The video performance of Girl Scouts silently dancing made its way onto mainstream news, bringing attention to ASCAP's demands. ASCAP deemed the Girl Scouts to be engaging in "public performance[s]" of the copyrighted works. Public performances are defined in Section 101 of the Copyright Act as a performance "where a substantial number of persons outside of a normal circle of a family and its social acquaintances is gathered."

ASCAP quickly sent a press statement claiming that it never intended on receiving royalties and has never brought nor threatened to bring suit against the Girl Scouts. ASCAP promised to reimburse any Girl Scout camp for the royalty fees that they may have paid. It was also reported that "in 1940 Irving Berlin had donated all future royalties from "God Bless America" to the Girl Scouts and Boy Scouts."

By September 1996, Girl Scout executives in New York said they believed "this unfortunate situation is resolved."

== See also ==
- Music law
- Creative Commons
- Section 115 Reform Act of 2006
- Music Publishers Association
- Production music
