= Criticism of intellectual property in the United Kingdom =

UK political ideologies

This page concerns criticism of United Kingdom copyright law.

Many individuals in the United Kingdom have accused the recent Copyright, Designs and Patents Act 1988 of criminalising file sharing. Section 52 has been abolished from the CDPA.

Also, the UK copyright law is one of the worst, according to Consumer Focus, after the law supposedly criminalized music and CD copying. A 2009 survey by Consumers International looked at intellectual property laws and enforcement practices in 16 countries worldwide.

== See also ==
- Anti-copyright
- Open Rights Group
