= Intellectual Property Act 2014 =

Act of the Parliament of the United Kingdom

Intellectual Property Act 2014 (Note: Section 24(6).)
- Act of Parliament
- Parliament of the United Kingdom
- Long title: An Act to make provision about intellectual property.
- Citation: 2014 c. 18
- Introduced by: Vince Cable MP, Secretary of State for Business, Innovation and Skills (Commons); Viscount Younger of Leckie 9 May 2013 (Lords)
- Territorial extent: England and Wales; Scotland; Northern Ireland; Isle of Man; (Note: Section 24(3)–(5).)

Dates
- Royal assent: 14 May 2014
- Commencement: 1 October 2014 (Note: Section 24(1)–(2))
Other legislation
Amends	Registered Designs Act 1949; House of Commons Disqualification Act 1975; Patents Act 1977; Copyright, Designs and Patents Act 1988; Freedom of Information Act 2000; Constitutional Reform Act 2005; Tribunals, Courts and Enforcement Act 2007
Amended by	Intellectual Property Act 2014 (Amendment) Regulations 2014; Patents (European Patent with Unitary Effect and Unified Patent Court) (Repeal and Revocation) Regulations 2021

Status: Amended

History of passage through Parliament

Text of statute as originally enacted

Revised text of statute as amended

The Intellectual Property Act 2014 (c. 18) is an act of the Parliament of the United Kingdom which received royal assent on 14 May 2014 after being introduced on 9 May 2013. The purpose of the legislation was to update copyright law, in particular design and patent law. The law arose as a result of Sir Ian Hargreaves' Review of Intellectual Property and Growth, an independent report published in May 2011.

Implementation was in part effected on 1 October 2014. One effect of the law was to removed the words "any aspect of" from the legal definition of a design, in order to reduce the scope for legal protection of minor aspects of unregistered designs. For unregistered designs commissioned after 1 October 2014, via section 2 of the Act, initial ownership now belongs to the designer and not the client, unless the parties have contracted for ownership to be otherwise handled.

The act implemented the Unified Patent Court, allowing for a single patent application across the European Union.

== Reception ==
The legislation was supported by the Law Society Intellectual Property Working Group.

The Labour Party peer Lord Stevenson described the legislation as opening a "Pandora's Box of unintended consequences" and said it could potentially discourage risk-taking.
