= Dramatic and Musical Performers' Protection Act 1958 =

Act of the Parliament of the United Kingdom

Dramatic and Musical Performers' Protection Act 1958 (Note: Section 9(1).)
- Act of Parliament
- Parliament of the United Kingdom
- Long title: An Act to consolidate the Dramatic and Musical Performers' Protection Act, 1925, and the provisions of the Copyright Act, 1956, amending it.
- Citation: 6 & 7 Eliz. 2. c. 44
- Territorial extent: United Kingdom (Note: Section 9(2).)

Dates
- Royal assent: 23 July 1958
- Commencement: 23 August 1958 (Note: Section 9(4).)
- Repealed: 1 August 1989

Other legislation
- Amends: See § Repealed enactments
- Repeals/revokes: See § Repealed enactments
- Amended by: Statute Law (Repeals) Act 1974
- Repealed by: Copyright, Designs and Patents Act 1988

Status: Repealed

Text of statute as originally enacted

The Dramatic and Musical Performers' Protection Act 1958 (6 & 7 Eliz. 2. c. 44) was an act of the Parliament of the United Kingdom that consolidated enactments relating to the protection of dramatic and musical performers in the United Kingdom.

== Provisions ==
=== Repealed enactments ===
Section 9(3) of the act repealed 2 enactments, listed in that section.

| Citation | Short title | Extent of repeal |
|---|---|---|
| 15 & 16 Geo. 5. c. 46 | Dramatic and Musical Performers' Protection Act 1925 | The whole act. |
| 4 & 5 Eliz. 2. c. 74 | Copyright Act 1956 | Section 45 and the Sixth Schedule. |

== Subsequent developments ==
Section 9(3) of the act was repealed by section 1 of, and part XI of the schedule to, the Statute Law (Repeals) Act 1974, which came into force on 27 June 1974.

The whole act was repealed by section 303(2) of, and schedule 8 to, the Copyright, Designs and Patents Act 1988, which came into force on 1 August 1989.
