= RWT (disambiguation) =

RWT is Rutland Weekend Television, a 1975–76 television sketch show written by Eric Idle.

RWT may also refer to:

- Rails with trails, a small subset of rail trails with a recreational trail alongside an operational railway
- Royal Waggon Train, a military unit of the British Armed Forces
- Russell Williams Limited, a company that designs and sells fabrics and wallpapers involved in the copyright case Designer Guild Ltd v Russell Williams (Textiles) Ltd
- Rotary-wing training, a part of the UK Military Flying Training System
- Renaissance World Tour, a concert tour by Beyoncé
