= Musical (Summary Proceedings) Copyright Act 1902 =

Act of the Parliament of the United Kingdom

Musical (Summary Proceedings) Copyright Act 1902 (Note: Section 4.)
- Act of Parliament
- Parliament of the United Kingdom
- Long title: An Act to amend the Law relating to Musical Copyright.
- Citation: 2 Edw. 7. c. 15
- Territorial extent: United Kingdom

Dates
- Royal assent: 22 July 1902
- Commencement: 1 October 1902
- Repealed: 1 June 1957 (Note: Section 51(2). The Copyright Act 1956 (Commencement) Order 1957.)
Other legislation
Repealed by	Copyright Act 1956

Status: Repealed

Text of statute as originally enacted

The Musical (Summary Proceedings) Copyright Act 1902 (2 Edw. 7. c. 15) was an act of the Parliament of the United Kingdom, given royal assent on 22 July 1902, in force from 1 October 1902, and repealed in 1956.

It provided that the owner of the copyright in a musical work could apply to a court of summary jurisdiction with evidence that unlicensed copies of the work were being "hawked, carried about, sold or offered for sale", and that the court could order a constable to seize these copies without warrant and bring them before the court. If it was proven the copies were unauthorized, the court could order them to be destroyed, or delivered to the copyright owner.

It also empowered any constable, on the written request (and risk) of the copyright owner or his or her designated agent, to seize without warrant any infringing copy being hawked for sale and bring them before a court; on the proof that they were copyright infringements, they could then be disposed of by the court as above.

In the context of this act, "musical work" meant a melody or harmony "printed, reduced to writing, or otherwise graphically produced or reproduced". Recorded music was not envisaged in the scope of the legislation.

== Subsequent developments ==
The whole act was repealed by section 50(2) of, and the ninth schedule to, the Copyright Act 1956 (4 & 5 Eliz. 2. c. 74), which came into force on 1 June 1957.
