= Infopaq International A/S v Danske Dagblades Forening =

Decision of the European Court of Justice

- European Court of Justice

Submitted 4 January 2008 Decided 16 July 2009
- Full case name: Infopaq International A/S v Danske Dagblades Forening
- Case: C-5/08
- Case type: Reference for a preliminary ruling
- Chamber: Fourth chamber
- Nationality of parties: Denmark
- Procedural history: Infopaq brought an action against DDF before the Østre Landsret. After the Østre Landsret dismissed that action, Infopaq brought an appeal before the Højesteret. Højesteret stayed the proceedings for a preliminary ruling by the ECJ.

Ruling
- An extract of a protected work comprising 11 words, is such as to come within the concept of re-production in part within the meaning of Article 2 of Directive 2001/29/EC, if the elements thus reproduced are the expression of the intellectual creation of their author.

Court composition
- Judge-Rapporteur; J. Malenovský
- President; K. Lenaerts
- Judges: T. von Danwitz; R. Silva de Lapuerta; G. Arestis
- Advocate General; V. Trstenjak

Legislation affecting
- Directive 2001/29

Keywords
- Copyright – Information society – Directive 2001/29/EC – Article 5(1) and (5) – Literary and artistic works – Reproduction of short extracts of literary works – Newspaper articles – Temporary and transient reproductions

Infopaq International A/S v Danske Dagblades Forening (2009) was a decision of the European Court of Justice concerning the interpretation of Directive 2001/29/EC on the harmonisation of certain aspects of copyright, and the conditions for exemption of temporary acts of reproduction. It established that (1) an act occurring during a data capture process is within the concept of reproduction in part within the meaning of Article 2 of Directive 2001/29, if the elements reproduced are the expression of the intellectual creation of their author, and (2) the act of printing out an extract of words during a data capture process does not fulfill the condition of being transient in nature as required by Article 5(1) of Directive 2001/29.

== Facts ==
Infopaq, a media monitoring and analysis business, was engaged in sending customers selected summarized articles from Danish daily newspapers and other periodicals by email. The articles were selected on the basis of certain subject criteria agreed with by customers and made available by means of a data capture process.

Danske Dagblades Forening (DDF), a professional association of Danish daily newspaper publishers, assists its members with copyright issues. DDF became aware that Infopaq was scanning newspaper articles for commercial purposes without authorization and complained to Infopaq about this procedure.

The data capture process comprises five phases. First, the publications are registered manually in an electronic registration database. Secondly, the publications are scanned, creating a TIFF (Tagged Image File Format) file created for each page. When scanning is completed, the TIFF file is transferred to an OCR (Optical Character Recognition) server. Thirdly, the OCR server translates the TIFF file into data that can be processed digitally. During that process, the image of each letter is translated into a character code which tells the computer what type of letter it is. The OCR process is completed by deleting the TIFF file. Fourthly, the text file is processed to find a search word defined beforehand. In order to make it easier to find the search word when reading the article, the five words which come before and after the search word are captured. At the end of the process the text file is deleted. Fifthly, at the end of the data capture process, a cover sheet is printed out for of all the pages where the relevant search word was found.

== Procedural history ==
Infopaq disputed DDF's claim that the procedure required consent from the rightholders and brought an action against DDF before the Østre Landsret (Eastern Regional Court), claiming that DDF should be ordered to acknowledge that Infopaq is entitled in Denmark to apply the above-mentioned procedure without the consent of DDF or of its members. After the Østre Landsret dismissed that action, Infopaq brought an appeal before the Højesteret, Denmark's highest court. The parties disagreed whether there was reproduction as contemplated by Article 2 of Directive 2001/29, as well as whether, if there is reproduction, the acts in question were covered by the exemption from the right of reproduction provided for in Article 5(1) of that directive.

The Højesteret court then referred 13 questions to the European Court of Justice. The first was if the storing and subsequent printing out of a text extract from an article in a daily newspaper, consisting of a search word and the five preceding and five subsequent words, can be regarded as an act of reproduction protected under Article 2 of Directive 2001/29. Questions 2-12 related to whether acts of reproduction occurring during a data capture process satisfy the conditions laid down in Article 5(1) of Directive 2001/29 (the act is temporary; transient or incidental; is an integral and essential part of a technological process; and the sole purpose is to enable transmission in a network between third parties by an intermediary, or a lawful use of a work or protected subject-matter; and the act has no independent economic significance), thereby not requiring consent of the relevant right holders. The thirteenth question related to whether this data capture process can be regarded as constituting a special case which does not conflict with a normal exploitation of the newspaper articles and not unreasonably prejudicing the legitimate interests of the right holder as specified in Article 5(5) of Directive 2001/29.

== Judgment ==
The ECJ held that printing is not transient in nature and consent was needed for Infopaq to use the publication.

In response to the first question, an 11-word extract of a protected work is a reproduction in part within the meaning of Article 2 of Directive 2001/29/EC, if the words reproduced are the expression of the intellectual creation of the author. The ECJ stated that it was for the national courts of EU countries to decide when such a reproduction is the author's expression of intellectual creation.

In response to questions 2–12, the act of printing out an 11-word extract during a data capture process does not fulfill the condition of being transient in nature as required by Article 5(1) of Directive 2001/29 and, therefore, that process cannot be carried out without the consent of the relevant right holders. In light of the answer to questions 2–12, it was not necessary for the ECJ to address question 13.

== Significance ==
This case highlights the problems of copyright infringement and new technology in new business models, especially those involving content aggregation. This decision is considered to have had a high impact on fundamental principles of copyright law, in concluding that the European standard of originality (the author's own intellectual creation) applies not only in the limited contexts to which it has been applied in legislation such as software, photographs and databases; but to all Berne Convention "works" under the European acquis.

== See also ==
- Information society
