= Copyright and Related Rights Regulations 2003 =

- Statutory Instrument
- Parliament of the United Kingdom
- Citation: SI 2003/2498

Dates
- Made: 27 September 2003
- Laid before Parliament: 3 October 2003
- Commencement: 31 October 2003
Other legislation
Amends	Copyright, Designs and Patents Act 1988
Made under	European Communities Act 1972, s. 2(2)
Transposes	Information Society Directive (2001/29/EC)

Status: Current legislation

Text of statute as originally enacted

Text of the Copyright and Related Rights Regulations 2003 as in force today (including any amendments) within the United Kingdom, from legislation.gov.uk.

The Copyright and Related Rights Regulations 2003 (SI 2003/2498) transpose the Information Society Directive "(Directive 2001/29/EC of the European Parliament and of the Council of 22 May 2001 on the harmonisation of certain aspects of copyright and related rights in the information society)", (known popularly at the time as the EU copyright directive), into United Kingdom law. As such, its main effects are to modify the Copyright, Designs and Patents Act 1988 (c. 48) ("the 1988 Act") with minor consequential modifications to other acts and secondary legislation.

The regulations modify the concept of broadcast and broadcasting to take account of development in the internet; restrict the acts which are permitted without infringing copyright (in particular acts which could be performed commercially); and provide new measures for the protection and enforcement of copyright and performers' rights.

Only two EU member states met the 22 December 2002 deadline for implement, the UK implemented the directive in 2003 but in November 2004 was convicted for non-implementation of the directive in the territory of Gibraltar.

== Broadcasts ==
Regulation 4 provides a new definition of "broadcast" in section 6 of the 1988 act as

an electronic transmission of visual images, sounds or other information which—

(a) is transmitted for simultaneous reception by members of the public and is capable of being lawfully received by them, or
(b) is transmitted at a time determined solely by the person making the transmission for presentation to members of the public,

Internet transmissions are excepted from the definition of a broadcast unless they are transmitted simultaneously with a broadcast by other means, simultaneously with a live event or form part of a service in which programmes are transmitted at specific times determined solely by the person providing the service.

The new definition covers the old definitions of broadcast and of "cable programme" (s. 7 of the 1988 act). However the separate definition of cable programme is kept as there is a distinction in the dates at which copyright becomes available: 1995-01-01 for cable programmes as opposed to 1956-06-01 for broadcasts under the previous definition.

== Communication to the public ==
The previous "infringement by broadcasting or inclusion in a cable programme" (s. 20 of the 1988 act) is replaced by a new "infringement by communication to the public" (reg. 6). This includes both broadcasting (under the new definition) and making a work available to the public by electronic transmission. A performer's rights are also infringed if his performance is made available to the public without his consent (reg; 7; new s. 182CA of the 1988 act).

== Permitted acts and copyright exceptions ==
Neither copyright (except in a computer program or a database) nor performer's rights are infringed by the simple act of transmitting the work between third parties over a network, even if the process of transmission involves making temporary copies (reg. 8)

The existing fair dealing for the purposes of research or private study (s. 29 of the 1988 act) was limited so that it is only permitted for a non-commercial purpose (reg. 9). A similar restriction was imposed on permitted copying by librarians (ss. 38, 39, 43 of the 1988 act; reg. 14) or archivists of folksongs (s. 61 of the 1988 act; reg. 16) for third parties. The observation or study of the functioning of a computer program was removed from the remit of fair dealing (reg. 9) and replaced by a statutory permission to study the functioning of the program while legally performing any of the acts of loading, displaying, running, transmitting or storing the program (reg. 15; new s. 50BA of the 1988 act). It was clarified that fair dealing for the purposes of criticism, review or news reporting is only allowed for published works (reg. 10).

The permitted use without a licence of copyright material for educational use (ss. 32, 35, 36 of the 1988 act) was restricted to non-commercial purposes (regs. 11–13). Regulation 18 removes the permission to use third parties (e.g. outside DJs) to play sound recordings for the purposes of a non-commercial club or society (s. 67 of the 1988 act). The exception for public showing or playing of broadcasts of music (s. 72 of the 1988 act) was also permitted, and the Secretary of State was enabled to propose a licensing scheme covering such public showing or playing, which may be compulsory (reg. 21).

== Technical measures ==
New s. 296 of the 1988 act created new rights in respect of copyright works to which copy protection measures have been applied. This right is held concurrently by:

- any person issuing copies of the work to the public or communicating the work to the public; and
- the owner of the copyright in the work, or his exclusive licensee; and
- the owner of any intellectual property right in the technical device or measure, or his exclusive licensee.
- who have the same rights against an infringement of this right as the owner of copyright has against infringement of copyright, including seizure.

The right is infringed:

- with respect to protected computer programs, by a person who "manufactures for sale or hire, imports, distributes, sells or lets for hire, offers or exposes for sale or hire, advertises for sale or hire or has in his possession for commercial purposes" any means "the sole intended purpose of which is to facilitate the unauthorised removal or circumvention of the technical device" or who publishes information intended to enable or assist other in removing or circumventing the technical device (new s. 296 of the 1988 act);
- with respect to other protected works, by a person who knowingly circumvents the technical measures (new s. 296ZA of the 1988 act);
- by a person who manufactures, imports, distributes, sells or advertises any device or product which, or provides services which:
  - are promoted or marketed for the purpose of circumventing such measures; or
  - have only limited commercial significance beyond circumventing such measures; or
  - are primarily designed, produced, adapted or performed for the purpose of enabling or facilitating the circumvention of such measures (new s. 296ZD of the 1988 act).

The new section 296ZB established the criminal offenses of:

- manufacturing for sale or hire, importation, sale or distribution of devices or products which are primarily designed or adapted for the purpose of the circumvention of technological measures;
- providing, promoting, advertising or marketing a service the purpose of which is to enable or facilitate the circumvention of technical measures.

The new section 296ZC allows the use of search warrants and forfeiture with respect to these offenses. The new section 296ZE created a remedy via complaint to the Secretary of State if a technical device or measure prevents a person or group of people from carrying out a permitted act with relation to the work. The Secretary of State may issue a direction to the owner of the copyright to take such measures as are necessary to enable the permitted act to be carried out. The breach of such a direction is actionable as a breach of statutory duty.

== Rights management information ==
New s. 296ZG of the 1988 act created new rights in respect of electronic rights management information metadata. The right is infringed by:

- the person who knowingly removes electronic copyright management information which is associated with a copy of a copyright work, or appears in connection with the communication to the public of a copyright work;
- the person who knowingly distributes or communicates to the public copies of a work from which electronic rights management information has been removed.

== Enforcement of copyright and performer's rights ==
The infringement of copyright or performer's rights by making a work available to the public in the course of a business or to an extent which prejudicially affects the copyright owner becomes a criminal offense (reg. 26; new s. 107(2A) of the 1988 act).

A copyright holder may obtain an injunction (Scots law: interdict) against an Internet service provider (ISP) who has "actual knowledge" of another person using their service to infringe copyright or a performer's right. In determining whether the ISP has actual knowledge of the infringing use, the High Court (or Court of Session in Scotland) shall take into account all matters which appear to be relevant, in particular whether the ISP has received notification under regulation 6(1)(c) of the Electronic Commerce (EC Directive) Regulations 2002 (SI 2002/2013) (reg. 27; new ss. 97A, 191JA of the 1988 act).

Regulation 28 extended the right to bring action for infringement of copyright to non-exclusive licensees (it was previously limited to copyright owners and exclusive licensees) when the infringement is directly connected to a prior licensed act by the licensee and the licence expressly grants a right of action (new s. 101A of the 1998 Act). The non-exclusive licensee shall have the same rights and remedies as the copyright owner would have in any action. The right of the non-exclusive licensee to bring action is concomitant with that of the copyright owner.

== Duration of protection ==
Regulation 29 amends section 13A of the 1988 act to take account of the new definition of "communication to the public" so that the copyright in sound recordings expires:

- at the end of the period of fifty years from the end of the calendar year in which the recording is made, or
- if during that period the recording is published, fifty years from the end of the calendar year in which it is first published, or
- if during that period the recording is not published but is made available to the public by being played in public or communicated to the public, fifty years from the end of the calendar year in which it is first so made available.

== See also ==
- Directive (European Union)
- Copyright law of the United Kingdom
- Copyright law of the European Union
- Digital Millennium Copyright Act
- Software cracking
- Peer-to-peer
