= Copyright, Designs and Patents Act 1988 =

Act of the Parliament of the United Kingdom

Copyright, Designs and Patents Act 1988 (Note: Section 306.)
- Act of Parliament
- Parliament of the United Kingdom
- Long title: An Act to restate the law of copyright, with amendments; to make fresh provision as to the rights of performers and others in performances; to confer a design right in original designs; to amend the Registered Designs Act 1949; to make provision with respect to patent agents and trade mark agents; to confer patents and designs jurisdiction on certain county courts; to amend the law of patents; to make provision with respect to devices designed to circumvent copy-protection of works in electronic form; to make fresh provision penalising the fraudulent reception of transmissions; to make the fraudulent application or use of a trade mark an offence; to make provision for the benefit of the Hospital for Sick Children, Great Ormond Street, London; to enable financial assistance to be given to certain international bodies; and for connected purposes.
- Citation: 1988 c. 48
- Territorial extent: Defined by s. 304; Part 1 extends (partially) to Bermuda by SI 2003/1517. (Note: Section 304.)

Dates
- Royal assent: 15 November 1988
- Commencement: 15 November 1988 (partially); 15 January 1989 (partially); 9 June 1989 (partially); 28 July 1989 (partially); 1 August 1989 (partially); 10 July 1990 (partially); 13 August 1990 (partially); 7 January 1991 (remainder); (Note: Section 305.)
Other legislation
Amends	Patents Act 1949; Ghana Independence Act 1957; Federation of Malaya Independence Act 1957; Public Records Act 1958; Jamaica Independence Act 1962; Malawi Independence Act 1964; Zambia Independence Act 1964; Malta Independence Act 1964; Gambia Independence Act 1964; Barbados Independence Act 1966; Marine, &c., Broadcasting (Offences) Act 1967; Restrictive Trade Practices Act 1976; Unfair Contract Terms Act 1977; Senior Courts Act 1981; Law Reform (Miscellaneous Provisions) (Scotland) Act 1985; Atomic Energy Authority Act 1986
Repeals/revokes	Copyright Act 1956
Amended by	Broadcasting Act 1990; Tribunals and Inquiries Act 1992; Taxation of Chargeable Gains Act 1992; Statute Law (Repeals) Act 1993; Duration of Copyright and Rights in Performances Regulations 1995; Copyright and Related Rights Regulations 1996; Copyright and Rights in Databases Regulations 1997; Broadcasting Act 1996; Scotland Act 1998; Copyright, etc. and Trade Marks (Offences and Enforcement) Act 2002; Copyright (Visually Impaired Persons) Act 2002; Legal Deposit Libraries Act 2003; Copyright and Related Rights Regulations 2003; Government of Wales Act 2006; Wireless Telegraphy Act 2006; National Health Service (Consequential Provisions) Act 2006; Performances (Moral Rights, etc.) Regulations 2006; Intellectual Property (Enforcement, etc.) Regulations 2006; Digital Economy Act 2010; Charities Act 2011; Intellectual Property Act 2014; Digital Economy Act 2017; Sentencing Act 2020; Digital Markets, Competition and Consumers Act 2024
Relates to	Re-use of Public Sector Information Regulations 2005; Artist's Resale Right Regulations 2006

Status: Amended

Text of statute as originally enacted

Revised text of statute as amended

Text of the Copyright, Designs and Patents Act 1988 as in force today (including any amendments) within the United Kingdom, from legislation.gov.uk.

The Copyright, Designs and Patents Act 1988 (c. 48), also known as the CDPA, is an act of the Parliament of the United Kingdom that received royal assent on 15 November 1988. It reformulates almost completely the statutory basis of copyright law (including performing rights) in the United Kingdom, which had, until then, been governed by the Copyright Act 1956 (4 & 5 Eliz. 2. c. 74). It also creates an unregistered design right, and contains a number of modifications to the law of the United Kingdom on Registered Designs and patents.

Essentially, the act and amendment establishes that copyright in most works lasts until 70 years after the death of the creator if known, otherwise 70 years after the work was created or published (50 years for computer-generated works).

In order for a creation to be protected by copyright it must fall within one of the following categories of work: literary work, dramatic work, musical work, artistic work, films, sound recordings, broadcasts, and typographical arrangement of published editions.

== The act ==
Part 1 of the act "restates and amends" (s. 172) the statutory basis for United Kingdom copyright law, although the Copyright Acts of 1911 (c. 46) and 1956 (c. 74) continue to have some effect in limited circumstances under ss. 170 & 171 and Schedule 1. It brings United Kingdom law into line with the Berne Convention for the Protection of Literary and Artistic Works, which the UK signed more than one hundred years previously, and allowed the ratification of the Paris Act of 1971.

=== Territorial application ===
Part I of the act (copyright provisions) extends to the whole of the United Kingdom (s. 157); amendments by Order in Council extended the act to Bermuda and Gibraltar. Works originating (by publication or nationality/domicile of the author) in the Isle of Man or the following former dependent territories qualify for copyright under the act: Antigua, Dominica, Gambia, Grenada, Guyana, Jamaica, Kiribati, Lesotho, St. Christopher-Nevis, St. Lucia, Swaziland and Tuvalu. All other countries of origin whose works qualified for United Kingdom copyright under the UK Copyright Act 1911 and Copyright Act 1956 continue to qualify under this act (para. 4(3) of Schedule 1).

== Works subject to copyright ==
The act simplifies the different categories of work which are protected by copyright, eliminating the specific treatment of engravings and photographs.

- literary, dramatic and musical works (s. 3): these must be recorded in writing or otherwise to be granted copyright, and copyright subsists from the date at which recording takes place. Literary work includes computer programs, compilations and databases.
- artistic works (s. 4): includes buildings, photographs, engravings and works of artistic craftsmanship.
- sound recordings and films (s. 5)
- broadcasts (s. 6): a broadcast is a transmission by wireless telegraphy which is intended for, and capable of reception by, members of the public.
- published editions (s. 8) means the published edition of the whole or part of one or more literary, dramatic or musical works.

The following works are exempted from copyright by the transitional provisions of Schedule 1:

- artistic works made before 1 June 1957 which constituted a design which could be registered under the Registered Designs Act 1949 c. 88 (or repealed measures) and which was used as a model for reproduction by an industrial process (para. 6);
- films made before 1 June 1957: these are treated as dramatic works (if they so qualify under the 1911 Act) and/or as photographs (para. 7);
- broadcasts made before 1 June 1957 and cable programmes transmitted before 1 January 1985 (para; 9).

Finally, section 3(2) states that copyright does not subsist in a literary, dramatic or musical work until it is recorded in writing or otherwise. This act of recording a work in any form is called "fixation." An example includes taking a photograph or writing down a poem. This fixes the work retrospectively from the moment the work was created.

The act as it received royal assent does not substantially change the qualification requirements of the author or the country of origin of the work, which are restated as ss. 153–156: these have since been largely modified, in particular by the Duration of Copyright and Related Rights Regulations 1995 No. 3297.

=== Rights in performances ===
Part II of the act creates a series of performers' rights in application of the Rome Convention for the Protection of Performers, Producers of Phonograms and Broadcasting Organisations of 1961. These rights are retrospective in respect of performances before commencement on 1 August 1989 (s. 180). These rights have been largely extended by the transposition of European Union directives and by the application of the WIPO Performances and Phonograms Treaty: the section below describes only the rights which were created by the Copyright, Designs and Patents Act 1988 itself.

A performer has the exclusive right to authorise the recording and/or broadcast of his performances (s. 182). The use or broadcast of recordings without the performer's consent (s. 183) and the import or distribution of illicit recordings (s. 184) are also infringements of the performer's rights. A person having an exclusive recording contract over one or more performances of an artist holds equivalent rights to the performer himself (ss. 185–188). Schedule 2 lists the permitted acts (limitations) in relation to these rights.

Rights in performances last for fifty years from the end of the year in which the performance was given (s. 191). They may not be assigned or transferred, and pass to the performer's executors on death (s. 192). An infringement of rights in performances is actionable under the tort of breach of statutory duty. Orders are available for the delivery up (Scots law: delivery) and disposal of infringing copies (ss. 195, 204): holders in rights in performances may also seize such copies (s. 196). The making, dealing in or use of infringing copies is a criminal offense (s. 198), as is the false representation of authority to give consent (s. 201).

== Duration of copyright ==
The provisions on duration have been largely modified by the Duration of Copyright and Related Rights Regulations 1995 No. 3297. The provisions of the act (ss. 12–15) as it received Royal Assent are given below. All periods of copyright run until the end of the calendar year in which they would otherwise expire. The duration of copyright under the act does not depend on the initial owner of the copyright, nor on the country of origin of the work. The following durations do not apply to Crown copyright, Parliamentary copyright or the copyright of international organisations.

Literary, dramatic, musical or artistic works	s. 12	Copyright lasts for seventy years from the death of the author. If the author is unknown, copyright expires seventy years after the work is first made available to the public (The Duration of Copyright and Rights in Performances Regulations 1995 amended these durations from the previous period of fifty to seventy years). If the work is computer-generated, copyright expires fifty years after the work is made.
Sound recordings and films	s. 13	Copyright lasts for fifty years after the recording is made. If the recording or film is released (published, broadcast or shown in public) within this period, the copyright lasts for seventy years from the date of release. (Amended from 50 years by The Copyright and Duration of Rights in Performances Regulations 2013). Note that the Duration of Copyright and Rights in Performances Regulations 1995 amended the durations, for films only, to seventy years from the death of the last principal director, author or composer. If the film is of unknown authorship: seventy years from creation, or if released within this period, seventy years from first release.
Broadcasts and cable programmes	s. 14	Copyright lasts for fifty years after the first broadcast or transmission. The repeat of a broadcast or a cable programme does not generate a new copyright period.
Typographical arrangements	s. 15	Copyright lasts for twenty-five years after the edition is published.

=== Transitional provisions ===
These provisions apply to works existing on 1 August 1989, other than those covered by Crown copyright or Parliamentary copyright (paras. 12 & 13 of Schedule 1).

The duration of copyright in the following types of work continued to be governed by the 1956 Act:

- engravings published posthumously;
- published photographs and photographs taken before 1 June 1957;
- published sound recordings and sound recordings made before 1 June 1957;
- published films and registered films;
- anonymous and pseudonymous literary, dramatic, musical or artistic works (other than photographs) where these have been published and unless the identity of the author becomes known.

— however these transitional provisions were largely cancelled by the 1995 Regulations, which in many cases caused lapsed UK copyrights to be revived.

Copyright in the following types of work lasts until 31 December 2039:

- unpublished literary, dramatic and musical works of which the author has died (unpublished in the sense of the proviso to s. 2(3) of the 1956 Act);
- unpublished engravings of which the author has died;
- unpublished photographs taken on or after 1 June 1957;
- unpublished sound recordings made on or after 1 June 1957, unless they are released during the period of copyright;
- films which were neither published nor registered, unless they are released during the period of copyright;
- works of universities and colleges which were protected by perpetual copyright under the Copyright Act 1775 c. 53.

=== Mass-produced artistic works ===
Artistic works that are mass-produced by an industrial process suffer from a downgrading of their copyright term from the life of the creator plus 70 to 25 years as a result of the provisions of section 52 of the Copyright, Designs and Patents Act 1988. The Enterprise and Regulatory Reform Act 2013 was introduced into Parliament on 23 May 2012 and received royal assent the next year in April. If section 56(2) of the Bill is enacted then artistic works that are mass-produced by the copyright holder will benefit from the same period of protection as those not replicated in large numbers. The result will be a significant extension from 25 years to that of the life of the creator plus 70 years. The proposed change is a reaction to pressure from the international furniture industry supported by manufacturers of decorative arts: copyright holders of many famous and much copied 20th century furniture design classics such as the Egg Chair and Barcelona Daybed hope that long expired copyright periods will be revived allowing for a further period of commercial exploitation. Some legal commentators have doubted whether the legislation will have the desired effect. They contend that many mass-produced items of 20th-century industrial furniture may not be defined by the courts of the United Kingdom as works of artistic craftsmanship but as mere designs. A design that is not an artistic work attracts no copyright protection under the act.

=== Peter Pan ===
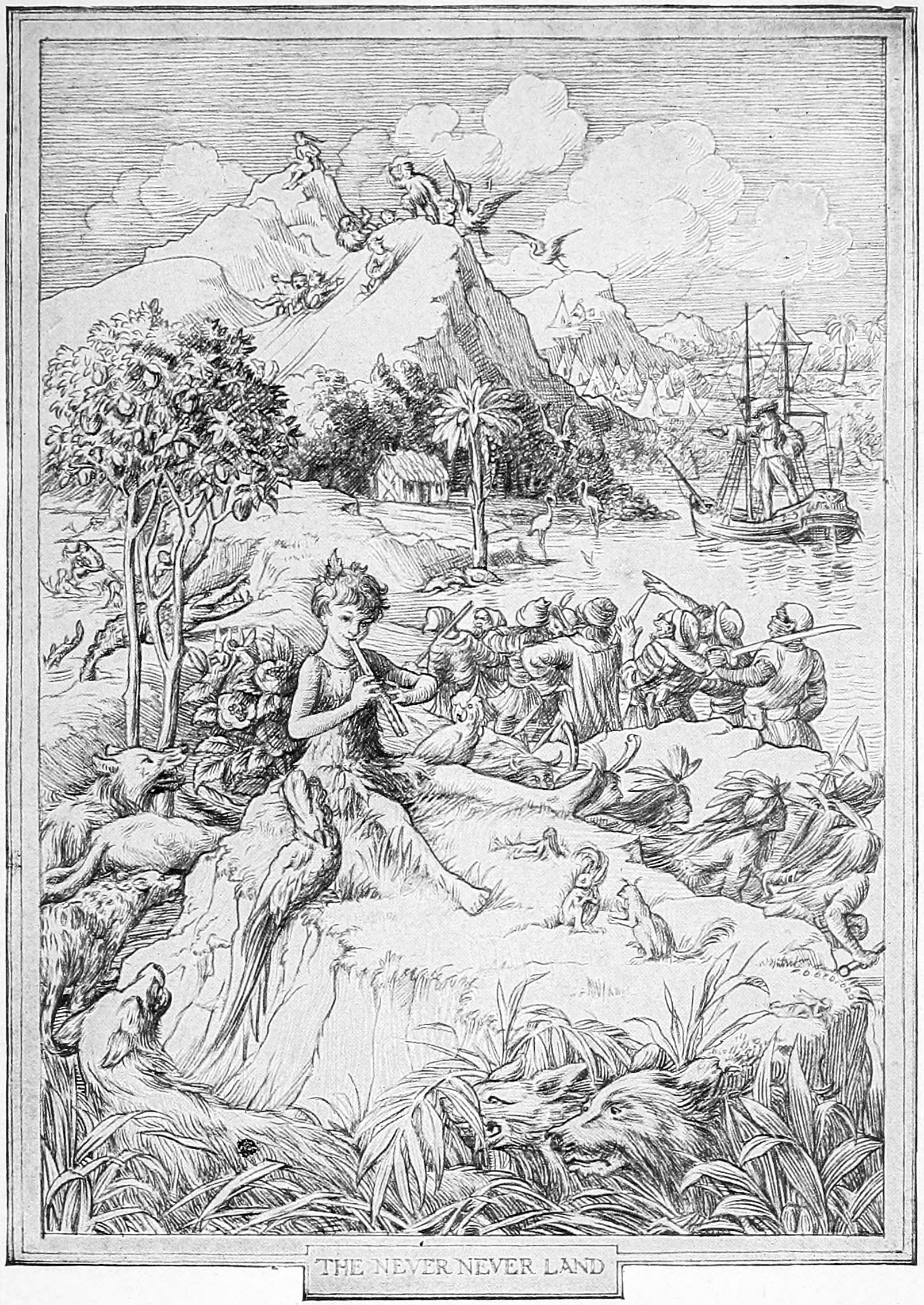
Illustration of Peter Pan playing the pipes, by F. D. Bedford from Peter and Wendy (1911)

Section 301 and Schedule 6 contain an unusual grant of the right to royalties in perpetuity, proposed by Jim Callaghan, enabling Great Ormond Street Hospital for Children to continue to receive royalties for performances and adaptations, publications and broadcast of "Peter Pan" whose author, J. M. Barrie, had given his copyright to the hospital in 1929, later confirmed in his will. Although often incorrectly referred to as a perpetual copyright, it does not confer Great Ormond Street Hospital full intellectual property rights over the work. The amendment was proposed when Peter Pan's copyright first expired on 31 December 1987, 50 years after Barrie's death, which was the copyright term at that time. Following EU legislation extending the term to author's life + 70 years, Peter Pan's copyright was revived in 1996 and expired on 31 December 2007 in the UK, where Great Ormond Street Hospital's right to remuneration in perpetuity now prevails.

== Fair dealing defences and permitted acts ==
Chapter III of Part I of the act provides for a number of situations where copying or use of a work will not be deemed to infringe the copyright, in effect limitations on the rights of copyright holders. The existing common law defences to copyright infringement, notably fair dealing and the public interest defence, are not affected (s. 171), although many of the statutory permitted acts would also qualify under one of the common law defences: the defence of statutory authority is specifically maintained in section 50. This chapter of the act has been substantially modified, notably by the Copyright and Related Rights Regulations 2003 No. 2498 transposing the EU Information Society Directive: the description below is of the act as it received royal assent.

=== Fair dealing defences ===
The following are also permitted acts (the list is not exhaustive):

- Fair dealing with a work for the purposes of private study or research (s. 29);
- Fair dealing with a work with acknowledgement for the purposes of quotation, criticism or review or, unless the work is a photograph, for the purposes of news reporting (s. 30);
- Fair dealing with a work for the purposes of caricature, parody or pastiche (s. 30A);
- Incidental inclusion of copyright material in another work (s. 31);
- Public reading or recital by a single person with acknowledgement (s. 59);
- Copying and distribution of copies of the abstracts of scientific and technical articles (s. 60);
- Recordings of folk songs for archives (s. 61);
- Photographs, graphic works, films or broadcasts of buildings and sculptures in a public place (s. 62) (see Freedom of panorama);
- Copying and distribution of copies of an artistic work for the purpose of advertising its sale (s. 63);
- Reconstruction of a building (s. 65)
- Rental of sound recordings, films and computer programs under a scheme which provides for reasonable royalty to the copyright holder (s. 66);
- Playing of sound recordings for the purposes of a non-commercial club or society (s. 67); (S. 67 was omitted (1.1.2011) by virtue of The Copyright, Designs and Patents Act 1988 (Amendment) Regulations 2010). The impact is that charities and not-for-profit organisations that do not fall within the voluntary exemptions offered by PPL now require a licence from the joint licensing system operated by PPL and PRS for Music;
- Recording for the purposes of time-shifting (s. 70);
- Free public showing of broadcasts (s. 72);
- Provision of subtitled copies of broadcasts for the handicapped by designated bodies (s. 74);
- Recording of broadcasts for archival purposes (s. 75).

=== Educational use ===
In general, limited copying for educational use (including examination) is permitted so long as it is 'fair dealing' and is performed by the person giving or receiving instruction (s. 32) or by the education establishment in the case of a broadcast (s. 35): however, reprographic copying of published editions is only permitted within the limit of 5% of the work per year (s. 36). Works may be performed in educational establishments without infringing copyright, provided that no members of the public are present (s. 34): the parents of pupils are considered members of the public unless they have some other connection with the establishment there are different things too.(e.g., by being teachers or governors). Further provisions are contained in secondary legislation.

=== Libraries and archives ===
Librarians may make and supply single copies of an article or of a reasonable proportion of a literary, artistic or musical work to individuals who request them for the purposes of private study or research (ss. 38–40); copying of the entire work is possible if it is unpublished and the author has not prohibited copying (s.–43). They may also make and supply copies to other libraries (s. 41) and make copies of works in their possession where it is not reasonably possible to purchase further copies (s. 42). The detailed conditions for making copies are contained in secondary legislation, currently the Copyright (Librarians and Archivists) (Copying of Copyright Material) Regulations 1989 No. 1212.

=== Public administration ===
Copyright is not infringed by anything done for the purposes of parliamentary or judicial proceedings or for the purposes of a Royal Commission or statutory inquiry (ss. 45, 46). The Crown may make copies of works which are submitted to it for official purposes (s. 48). Material which is open to public inspection or on an official register may be copied under certain conditions: this includes material made open to public inspection by the European Patent Office and by the World Intellectual Property Organization under the Patent Cooperation Treaty, and material held as public records under the Public Records Act 1958 c. 51 or similar legislation (s. 49).

=== Relevant cases ===
- Test of joint ownership - Problems can occur when there is a need to determine whether a person involved in the creation of a piece of work may have joint ownership. When this is the case, there is a test that can be applied, similar to the one which is used to determine originality. This test is used in order to show that the labour, skill and judgement exercised by the author are unique and are that of which are protected by copyright.
  - Levy v Rutley [1871] - In this case it was stated that there can be no finding of joint authorship in a copyright work in the absence of a common intention to that effect. It is implicit in the concept of 'collaboration' that there must be "joint labouring in the furtherance of a common design". This means that it is necessary for both authors to make a significant contribution and that they must have had a similar plan. The levy judgement was subsequently approved by the case of Beckingham v Hodgens 2003.
  - Stuart v Barret [1994] - The court described the test for joint authorship in a work of music: "What the claimant to joint authorship of a work must establish is that he has made a significant and original contribution to the creation of the work and that he has done so pursuant to a common design." It is not necessary that his contribution to the work is equal in terms of either quantity, quality, or originality to that of his collaborators. Nor, in the case of a song, does it matter that his contribution is to the orchestral arrangement of the song rather than to the song itself."
  - Godfrey v Lees [1995] - The claimant was a classically trained pianist invited by a pop group to reside with them and act as orchestral arranger of a number of their songs. He never became a member of the group. The issue here was whether the claimant was the joint owner of copyright in six musical works for which he had made orchestral arrangements or contributed to their composition. It was held that the claimant had established that he had made a significant and original contribution to the creation of the work and must be regarded as a joint author. But as he had waited 14 years before asserting his rights, he was stopped from revoking the implied license granted to the pop group for the exploitation of the works.
  - Cala Homes Ltd v Alfred Mcalpine Homes East Ltd [1995] - The case concerned the relevance of the joint authorship test in employment relationships. Mr Justice Laddie delivers the judgement in which he says '"to have regard merely to who pushed the pen is too narrow a view of authorship." Therefore, it is wrong to think that the only person who carries out the mechanical act of fixation is the author.
  - Julia Kogan v Nicholas Martin and others [2019] - This is the leading case which sets out the test of joint authorship. The case reviewed s. 10(1) which defines a "work of joint authorship." Section 10(1) states that a work of joint authorship is a work produced by the collaboration of two or more authors in which the contribution of each author is not distinct from that of the other author/author's. From this the court outlined four elements of joint authorship: collaboration, authorship, contribution, and non-distinctiveness of contribution.
- Test of originality
  - University of London Press v University Tutorial Press [1916] - This case explains the concept of originality. Here, examiners were hired to create exam scripts for the University of London. The question arose as to whether certain mathematics exam papers were original literary works. The exam papers just consisted of conventional maths problems in a conventional manner. The court held that originality does not mean that the work must be an expression of individual thought. The simple fact that the authors drew on a body of knowledge common to mathematicians did not compromise originality. The requirement of originality, it was held, does not require that expression be in an original or novel form. It does, however, require that the work not be copied from another work. It must originate from the author. As such, even though these were the same old maths problems every student is familiar with, and even though there was no creative input, the skill, labor, and judgement of the authors was sufficient to make the papers original literary works. Essentially, the criteria are satisfied if the work is not a copy of a preceding work and it is originated from the author, who must have exercised the requisite labor, skill or judgement in producing the work.
  - Interlego AG v Tyco Industries Inc [1989] "the Lego brick case" - This case established that not every minor alteration on an object amounts to a new copyright existence. There has to be some additional element of material alteration sufficient to make the work original. In other words, to say that a new copyright protection existed in what was essentially the same work would result in protection being extended indefinitely through a continuation of minor changes.
  - Infopaq International A/S v Danske Dagblades Forening [2009] - This case determined that extracting 11 words of text from an alternative source amounted to unlawful copying. The Court of Justice of the European Union decided that copying a short sentence/phrase from a literal work might be regarded as substantial copying if those words were the result of the intellectual creation of the author. The case received subsequent approval from The NLA and others v Meltwater Holding BV and others [2011].
  - Football Dataco Ltd v Yahoo! UK Ltd and others [2012] - This case established that football fixture lists are not protected by copyright if the compilation is not the authors own intellectual creation even if the compilation required significant labor, judgement and skill [at 42]. The Dataco case emphasizes the need for creative choices and decisions to be made in addition to the labor and skill that is required to produce the work in question.
- The Primary Infringement Test for Economic rights
  - Designers Guild v Russell Williams [2000] - Designers Guild determined that copyright infringement occurs when a defendant has taken a substantial part of an original work. The courts in making a determination of substantial pay regard to its quality, not whether the two works look alike or the same. An important distinction which means reference must be made to a work's quality rather than quantity.
- Performing rights
  - Gramophone Company v Stephen Cawardine [1934] - The coffee shop, Stephen Carwardine & Co, had been keeping its customers entertained by playing records. EMI, then called The Gramophone Company and argued that it was against the law to play the record in public without first receiving the permission of the copyright owners. The judge agreed, establishing this as a legal principle. EMI and Decca formed Phonographic Performance Ltd (PPL) to carry out this licensing role and opened the first office in London. The Copyright Act 1956 led to the expansion of PPL's role to also cover the licensing of broadcasters that played recorded music. Further copyright law changes in 1988 strengthened PPL's licensing position. In 1996, performers were given the rights to receive 'equitable remuneration' where recordings of their performances were played in public or broadcast – leading to PPL paying them royalties directly for the first time. In addition, it was stated by Maugham J that, "the arrangement of the recording instruments in the building where the record is to be made, the building itself, the timing to fit the record, the production of the artistic effects, and, perhaps above all, the persons who play the instruments, not forgetting the conductor, combine together to make an artistic record, which is very far from the mere production of a piece of music".
- Test of first ownership of copyright in sound recordings
  - A&M Records v Video Collection International [1995] – Torvill and Dean wanted to create music to dance to. Their service company, Inside Edge ("IE"), was given the task of doing this. IE engaged a Mr. Pullen who in turn engaged an arranger and a conductor (R). It was common ground that R did the following – commissioned and paid for the musical arrangements, booked and paid for the studio, arranged and paid for the attendance of the 51 musicians necessary to make the recording, engaged and paid for the scoring, a sound engineer, and a fixer and paid for all expenses of the sessions such as meals, taxis, etc. The issue in this case: who was the "author" of the sound recording under s. 9(2) CDPA? By whom were the arrangements necessary for the making of the recording undertaken? Alternatively, was IE the owner in equity under the principles of Massine v De Basil? And if the plaintiffs were not the owners of the copyright, was R stopped from asserting his ownership? In the case, it was held that IE undertook the arrangements through Mr. Pullen. R made the recordings, but Mr. Pullen undertook the arrangements. It was also an implied term in the contract between R and Mr. Pullen that IE would own the copyright. However, had IE not been the copyright owner, R would not have been stopped because he was not aware of his rights.
- Moral rights
  - Turner Entertainment co. v Huston, CA [1992] – This case concerned the colorization of a black and white American film directed by John Huston. After John's death the film was colorized by Turner Entertainment. The heirs of Huston and others sought to prevent the broadcast of the colorized version on French national TV, and were successful. The colorization of the film breached the heirs moral right of integrity under French law. The case would also be actionable under UK law via s. 77–83.

== Moral rights ==
The act creates a specific regime of moral rights for the first time in the United Kingdom: previously, an author's moral right had to be enforced through other torts, e.g. defamation, passing off, malicious falsehood. The author's moral rights are:

- the right to be identified as the author or the director, right which has to be "asserted" at the time of publication (ss. 77–79);
- the right to object to derogatory treatment of work (ss. 80–83);
- the right to object to false attribution of work (s. 84);
- the right to privacy of certain photographs and films (s. 85).

The moral rights of an author cannot be transferred to another person (s. 94) and pass to their heirs on his death (s. 95): however, they may be waived by consent (s. 87). The right to object to false attribution of a work lasts for twenty years after the author's death. The other moral rights last for the same period as the other copyright rights in the work (s. 86).

There are some narrow exceptions to moral rights. For example, s. 79 states that the right to be named as author does not apply in relation to computer programs, design of a typeface, or any other computer generated work. Additionally, the right to object to any derogatory treatment, does not apply to computer programs, works made for the reporting of current events, newspaper publications, or collective works of reference (s. 81).

Once someone has successfully claimed their moral rights to be infringed, they are entitled to a remedy. As moral rights are non-economic in nature, damages would be for non-economic loss. For example, this might include a remedy imposed by the court that requires the defendant to issue a disclaimer dissociating the author from any derogatory treatment of the work in question.

== Crown and parliamentary copyrights ==
The act simplifies the regime of Crown copyright, that is the copyright in works of the United Kingdom government, and abolishes the perpetual Crown copyright in unpublished works of the Crown. It also creates the separate concept of parliamentary copyright for the works of the Parliament of the United Kingdom and the Scottish Parliament, and applies similar rules to the copyrights of certain international organisations.

Crown copyright last for fifty years after publication, or 125 years after creation for unpublished works (s. 163): however, no unpublished works of the Crown will come into the public domain until 31 December 2039, that is fifty years after the commencement of section 163. Acts of the United Kingdom and Scottish parliaments and Church of England measures are protected by Crown copyright for fifty years from royal assent (s. 164). Works of the parliaments of the United Kingdom and of Scotland, except bills and acts, are protected by parliamentary copyright for fifty years after creation: bills are protected from the date of their introduction to the date of royal assent or of rejection (ss. 165–167, Parliamentary Copyright (Scottish Parliament) Order 1999 No. 676). The works of the United Nations and its specialised agencies and of the Organisation of American States are protected for fifty years after creation (s. 168, Copyright (International Organisations) Order 1989 No. 989).

== Enforcement of copyright ==
Infringement of copyright is actionable by the copyright owner as the infringement of a property right (s. 96) or, in the case of infringement of moral rights, as the tort of breach of statutory duty (s. 103). Damages will not be awarded against an "innocent" defendant, i.e. one who did not know and had no reason to know that the work was under copyright, but other remedies (e.g. injunction, account of profits: Scots law interdict, accounting and payment of profits) continue to be available (s. 97, see Microsoft v Plato Technology). Orders are available for the delivery up (Scots law: delivery) and disposal of infringing copies (ss. 99, 114): copyright owners may also seize such copies (s. 100). The making, dealing in or use of infringing copies is a criminal offence (s. 107). Copyright owners may ask the HM Revenue and Customs to treat infringing copies as "prohibited goods", in which case they are prohibited from import (s. 111). Section 297 of the act makes it an offense to fraudulently receive broadcasts for which a payment is required. Section 300 creates the offense of fraudulently using a trademark, inserted as ss. 58A–58D of the Trade Marks Act 1938 c. 22.

=== Infringement of performers' rights ===
The Copyright and Related Rights Regulations 2003 amended the CDPA to provide an additional right of performers to require consent before making copies of their performances available to the public by electronic transmission.

=== Secondary infringement ===
The act codifies the principle of secondary infringement, that is knowingly enabling or assisting in the infringement of copyright, which had previously been applied at common law (see R v Kyslant). Secondary infringement covers:

- importing infringing copies (s. 22);
- possessing or dealing with infringing copies (s. 23);
- providing means for making infringing copies (s. 24);
- permitting the use of premises for infringing performances (s. 25);
- providing apparatus for infringing performances (s. 26).

Liability for secondary infringement is dependent on the defendant knowing or having reason to believe, that the activities in question are wrongful. This question of requisite knowledge is determined objectivity.

=== Criminal offences ===
Copyright infringement that may be criminal offences under the Copyright, Designs and Patents Act 1988 are the:

- Making copies for the purpose of selling or hiring them to others
- Importing infringing copies (except for personal use)
- Offering for sale or hire, publicly displaying or otherwise distributing infringing copies in the course of a business
- Distributing a large enough number of copies to have a noticeable effect on the business of the copyright owner
- Making or possessing equipment for the purposes of making infringing copies in the course of a business
- Publicly performing a work in knowledge that the performance is unauthorised
- Communicating copies or infringing the right to "make available" copies to the public (either in the course of a business, or to an extent prejudicial to the copyright owner)
- Manufacturing commercially, importing for non-personal use, possessing in the course of a business, or distributing to an extent that has a noticeable effect on the business of the copyright holder, a device primarily designed for circumventing a technological copyright protection measure.

The penalties for these copyright infringement offences may include:

- Before a magistrates' Court, the penalties for distributing unauthorised files are a maximum fine of £5,000 and/or six months imprisonment;
- On indictment (in the Crown Court) some offences may attract an unlimited fine and up to 10 years imprisonment.

== Copyright Tribunal ==
The act establishes the Copyright Tribunal as a continuation of the tribunal established under s. 23 of the 1956 Act (s. 145). The Tribunal is empowered (s. 149) to hear and determine proceedings concerning:

- copyright licensing schemes;
- royalties for rental of sound recordings, films or computer programs;
- licences made available as of right under s. 144 (powers of the Monopolies and Mergers Commission under the Fair Trading Act 1973 c. 41);
- the refusal of a performer to give consent under his rights in performances;
- royalties under the perpetual copyright of "Peter Pan" (see above).

An appeal on any point of law lies to the High Court, or to the Court of Session under Scots law.

== Design right ==
Part III of the act creates a "design right" separate from the registration of designs governed by the Registered Designs Act 1949. To qualify, the design must be original (not commonplace in the field in question) and not fall into one of the excluded categories (s. 213(3)):

- principles and methods of construction;
- articles which must connect with or otherwise fit another article so that one or the other may perform their function;
- designs which are dependent on the appearance of another article;
- surface decoration.

The design must be recorded in a document after 1989-08-01 (s. 213(6)): designs recorded or used before that date do not qualify (s. 213(7)).

The design right lasts for fifteen years after the design is recorded in a document, or for ten years if articles have been made available for sale (s. 216).

=== Designs and typefaces ===
The copyright in a design document is not infringed by making or using articles to that design, unless the design is an artistic work or a typeface (s. 51). If an artistic work has been exploited with permission for the design by making articles by an industrial process and marketing them, the work may be copied by making or using articles of any description after the end of a period of twenty-five years from the end of the calendar year when such articles were first marketed (s. 52). It is not an infringement of the copyright in a typeface to use it in the ordinary course of printing or to use the material produced by such printing (s. 54).

=== Registered designs ===
Part IV of the act contains a certain number of amendments to the Registered Designs Act 1949 c. 88. The criteria for registration of a design and the duration of the registered design right (ss. 1 & 8 of the 1949 Act) are notably modified. Provisions are also added to allow ministers to take action to protect the public interest in monopoly situations (s. 11A of the 1949 Act) and to provide for compensation for Crown use of registered designs (para. 2A to Schedule 1 to the 1949 Act). A consolidated version of the Registered Designs Act 1949 is included (s. 273, Schedule 4).

== Patents and trademarks ==
Part V of the act provides for the registration of patent agents and trade mark agents and for the privilege of their communications with clients from disclosure in court. Part VI of the act creates a system of patents county courts for proceedings involving patents which are of a lesser financial implication.

== Commencement ==
There are numerous commencement dates for the different sections of the act, detailed below. The provisions on copyright, rights in performances and design right came into force on 1 August 1989, while the registration of patent agents and trade mark agents came into force on 13 August 1990.

Date of commencement	Provisions	Authority for commencement
15 November 1988	s. 301 and Schedule 6 paras. 24 & 29 of Schedule 5	s. 305(1)
15 January 1989	ss. 293 & 294	s. 305(2)
28 July 1989	ss. 304(4) & (6)	Copyright, Designs and Patents Act 1988 (Commencement No. 4) Order 1989
1 August 1989	Parts I–III; Parts IV, VI & VII except for provisions mentioned elsewhere Schedules 1–3, 5, 7 & 8 except for provisions below	Copyright, Designs and Patents Act 1988 (Commencement No. 1) Order 1989
13 August 1990	Part V para 21 of Schedule 3 Schedule 4 para. 27 of Schedule 5 paras. 15, 18(2) & 21 of Schedule 7 consequential repeals of Schedule 8 ss. 272, 295, 303(1) & (2) insofar as they relate to the above	Copyright, Designs and Patents Act 1988 (Commencement No. 5) Order 1990
7 January 1991	paras. 1–11, 17–23, 25, 26, 28 & 30 of Schedule 5 consequential repeals in Schedule 8 ss. 295 & 303(2) insofar as they relate to the above	Copyright, Designs and Patents Act 1988 (Commencement No. 6) Order 1990

The Copyright, Designs and Patents Act 1988 (Commencement No. 2) and (Commencement No. 3) Orders 1989 are technical measures to allow the preparation of secondary legislation.

== Modifications ==
=== Transposition of European Union directives ===
The following regulations were made under the European Communities Act 1972 in order to implement European Union directives in UK law.

Directive	Transposition
Council Directive 87/54/EEC of 16 December 1986 on the legal protection of topographies of semiconductor products	Design Right (Semiconductor Topographies) Regulations 1989 No. 1100
Council Directive 91/250/EEC of 14 May 1991 on the legal protection of computer programs	Copyright (Computer Programs) Regulations 1992 No. 3233
Council Directive 92/100/EEC of 19 November 1992 on rental right and lending right and on certain rights related to copyright in the field of intellectual property	Copyright and Related Rights Regulations 1996 No. 2967
Council Directive 93/98/EEC of 29 October 1993 harmonizing the term of protection of copyright and certain related rights	Duration of Copyright and Rights in Performances Regulations 1995 No. 3297
Council Directive 93/83/EEC of 27 September 1993 on the coordination of certain rules concerning copyright and rights related to copyright applicable to satellite broadcasting and cable retransmission	Copyright and Related Rights Regulations 1996 No. 2967
Directive 96/9/EC of the European Parliament and of the Council of 11 March 1996 on the legal protection of databases	Copyright and Rights in Databases Regulations 1997 No. 3032
Directive 2001/29/EC of the European Parliament and of the Council of 22 May 2001 on the harmonisation of certain aspects of copyright and related rights in the information society, more usually known as the Information Society Directive	Copyright and Related Rights Regulations 2003 No. 2498
Directive 2001/84/EC of the European Parliament and of the Council of 27 September 2001 on the resale right for the benefit of the author of an original work of art	Artist's Resale Right Regulations 2006 No. 346
Directive 2004/48/EC of the European Parliament and of the Council of 29 April 2004 on the enforcement of intellectual property rights	Intellectual Property (Enforcement, etc.) Regulations 2006 No. 1028
Directive 2006/115/EC of the European Parliament and of the Council of 12 December 2006 on rental right and lending right and on certain rights related to copyright in the field of intellectual property, which replaced the Rental Directive	Copyright, Designs and Patents Act 1988 (Amendment) Regulations 2010 No. 2694

Also:

- Copyright (EC Measures Relating to Pirated Goods and Abolition of Restrictions on the Import of Goods) Regulations 1995 No. 1445
- Copyright and Rights in Performances (Quotation and Parody) Regulations 2014 No. 2356

=== Other modifying measures ===
- National Health Service and Community Care Act 1990 c. 19
- Courts and Legal Services Act 1990 c. 41
- Broadcasting Act 1990 c. 42
- Judicial Pensions and Retirement Act 1993 c. 8
- Charities Act 1993 c. 10
- Trade Marks Act 1994 c. 26
- Criminal Justice and Public Order Act 1994 c. 33
- Broadcasting Act 1996 c. 55
- Parliamentary Copyright (Scottish Parliament) Order 1999 No. 676
- Conditional Access (Unauthorised Decoders) Regulations 2000 No. 1175
- Copyright, etc. and Trade Marks (Offences and Enforcement) Act 2002 c. 25
- Copyright (Visually Impaired Persons) Act 2002 c. 33
- Legal Deposit Libraries Act 2003 c. 28
- Re-use of Public Sector Information Regulations 2005 No. 1515
- Performances (Moral Rights, etc.) Regulations 2006 No. 18

== Other secondary legislation ==
- Copyright (Industrial Process and Excluded Articles) (No. 2) Order 1989 No. 1070

== See also ==
- Sui generis database right#United Kingdom
- Office of Fair Trading
- Related rights
- Copyright user rights for educational purposes detailed in the act

== Notes ==
1. Section 304 of the CDPA.
2. The Berne Convention came into force for the United Kingdom on 5 December 1887. The United Kingdom ratified the Paris Act of the convention on 2 January 1990. The Paris Act extends to the Isle of Man from 18 March 1996. Source: Contracting parties. Berne Convention for the Protection of Literary and Artistic Works. WIPO Lex. Retrieved 2025-05-27.
3. Modifications to the duration of copyright were by transposition of Council Directive 93/98/EEC of 29 October 1993 harmonizing the term of protection of copyright and certain related rights, OJ no. L290 of 24 November 1993, p. 9.
4. Directive 2001/29/EC of the European Parliament and of the Council of 22 May 2001 on the harmonisation of certain aspects of copyright and related rights in the information society, OJ no. L167 of 22 June 2001, p. 10, corrected by OJ no. L006 of 10 January 2002, p. 70.
5. This does not apply if there is an approved licensing scheme which covers the broadcasts. See Copyright (Certification of Licensing Scheme for Educational Recording of Broadcasts) (Open University) Order 2003 No. 187.
6. Copyright (Application of Provisions relating to Educational Establishments to Teachers) (No. 2) Order 1989 No. 1067. Copyright (Educational Establishments) Order 2005 No. 223.
7. Copyright (Librarians and Archivists) (Copying of Copyright Material) Regulations 1989 No. 1212.
8. Copyright (Material Open to Public Inspection) (Marking of Copies of Maps) Order 1989 No. 1099. Copyright (Material Open to Public Inspection) (Marking of Copies of Plans and Drawings) Order 1990 No. 1427.
9. Copyright (Material Open to Public Inspection) (International Organisations) Order 1989 No. 1098.
10. Public Records (Scotland) Act 1937 c. 43. Public Records (Northern Ireland) Act 1923 c. 20 (N.I.).
11. Copyright (Recordings of Folksongs for Archives) (Designated Bodies) Order 1989 No. 1012.
12. Copyright (Sub-titling of Broadcasts and Cable Programmes) (Designated Body) Order 1989 No. 1013.
13. Copyright (Recording for Archives of Designated Class of Broadcasts and Cable Programmes) (Designated Bodies) Order 1993 No. 74.
14. See also Copyright and Rights in Performances (Notice of Seizure) Order 1989 No. 1006.
15. See also Copyright (Customs) Regulations 1989 No. 1178. Goods Infringing Intellectual Property Rights (Customs) Regulations 2004 No. 1473.
16. See also Copyright Tribunal Rules 1989 No. 1129. Copyright Tribunal (Amendment) Rules 1991 No. 201. Copyright Tribunal (Amendment) Rules 1992 No. 467.
17. The Parliamentary Copyright (Scottish Parliament) Order 1999 No. 676.
18. The Copyright (International Organisations) Order 1989 No. 989, ISBN 0-11-096989-8.
19. The Copyright (Bermuda) Order 2003 No. 1517, ISBN 0-11-046509-1.
20. The Copyright (Gibraltar) Order 2005 No. 853, ISBN 0-11-072694-4.
21. The Copyright (Application to the Isle of Man) Order 1992 No. 1313, ISBN 0-11-024313-7.
22. Botswana, the Seychelles, the Solomon Islands and Uganda have been removed from the list of countries enjoying qualification as former dependent territories with respect to the list which applied for the 1956 Act: The Copyright (Status of Former Dependent Territories) Order 1990 No. 1512, ISBN 0-11-004512-2.
23. See also Copyright and Performances (Application to Other Countries) Order 2006 No. 316.
24. The United Kingdom became a party to the Rome Convention for the Protection of Performers, Producers of Phonograms and Broadcasting Organisations on 18 May 1964 subject to a declaration concerning Articles 5(1)(b), 6(2) and 16(1)(a)(ii), (iii) and (iv) [Le Droit d'auteur, 1963, p. 244]. The convention extends to Gibraltar and Bermuda with the same declaration [Copyright, 1967, p. 36; Copyright, 1970, p. 108], and to the Isle of Man (with effect from 28 July 1999). Source: Contracting parties. Rome Convention for the Protection of Performers, Producers of Phonograms and Broadcasting Organizations. WIPO Lex. Retrieved 2025-05-27.
25. The application of the WIPO Performances and Phonograms Treaty in UK law is made by the Performances (Moral Rights, etc.) Regulations 2006 No. 18.
26. This provision has been extended to Guernsey: Fraudulent Reception of Transmissions (Guernsey) Order 1989 No. 2003.
27. The Copyright, Designs and Patents Act 1988 (Commencement No. 4) Order 1989 No. 1303.
28. The Copyright, Designs and Patents Act 1988 (Commencement No. 1) Order 1989 No. 816.
29. The Copyright, Designs and Patents Act 1988 (Commencement No. 5) Order 1990 No. 1400.
30. The Copyright, Designs and Patents Act 1988 (Commencement No. 6) Order 1990 No. 2168.
31. The Copyright, Designs and Patents Act 1988 (Commencement No. 2) Order 1989 No. 955. The Copyright, Designs and Patents Act 1988 (Commencement No. 3) Order 1989 No. 1032.
32. Design Right (Semiconductor Topographies) Regulations 1989 No. 1100, amended by the Design Right (Semiconductor Topographies) (Amendment) Regulations 2006 No. 1833.
33. Copyright (Computer Programs) Regulations 1992 No. 3233.
34. Copyright and Related Rights Regulations 1996 No. 2967
35. The Duration of Copyright and Rights in Performances Regulations 1995 No. 3297, ISBN 0-11-053833-1.
36. Copyright and Rights in Databases Regulations 1997 No. 3032, amended by the Copyright and Rights in Databases (Amendment) Regulations 2003 No. 2501.
37. The Copyright and Related Rights Regulations 2003 No. 2498, ISBN 0-11-047709-X.
38. The United Kingdom lost a "failure to transpose" case in the European Court of Justice with respect to Directive 2001/29/EC: Commission of the European Communities v United Kingdom of Great Britain and Northern Ireland (Case C-88/04), OJ no. C045 of 19 February 2005, p. 11.
39. Artist's Resale Right Regulations 2006 No. 346.
40. Intellectual Property (Enforcement, etc.) Regulations 2006 No. 1028.
41. Copyright (EC Measures Relating to Pirated Goods and Abolition of Restrictions on the Import of Goods) Regulations 1995 No. 1445.
42. The Parliamentary Copyright (Scottish Parliament) Order 1999 No. 676.
43. Conditional Access (Unauthorised Decoders) Regulations 2000 No. 1175.
44. For commencement, see the Copyright, etc. and Trade Marks (Offences and Enforcement) Act 2002 (Commencement) Order 2002 No. 2749
45. For commencement, see the Copyright (Visually Impaired Persons) Act 2002 (Commencement) Order 2003 No. 2499
46. For commencement, see the Legal Deposit Libraries Act 2003 (Commencement) Order 2004 No. 130
47. Re-use of Public Sector Information Regulations 2005 No. 1515.
48. Performances (Moral Rights, etc.) Regulations 2006 No. 18.
