= List of acts of the Parliament of the United Kingdom from 2014 =

This is a list of acts of the Parliament of the United Kingdom passed in 2014.

Acts passed since 1963 are cited by calendar year, as opposed to the convention used for earlier acts of citing the regnal year(s) in which the relevant parliamentary session was held. Each act passed in a respective year is given a chapter number (abbreviated "c."), denoted by Arabic numerals in the case of public general acts, lowercase Roman numerals in the case of local acts, or italicised Arabic numerals in the case of personal acts. These run as separate series.

32 acts of Parliament were passed in 2014: 30 public general acts and 2 local acts.

indicates that an act has been transcribed on Wikisource, indicates that an act is available to view at legislation.gov.uk, and indicates the location of the original act in the Parliamentary Archives.

== Public general acts ==
Short title	Citation	Royal assent
Long title
Mesothelioma Act 2014	2014 c. 1	30 January 2014
An Act to establish a Diffuse Mesothelioma Payment Scheme and make related provision; and to make provision about the resolution of certain insurance disputes.
Local Audit and Accountability Act 2014	2014 c. 2	30 January 2014
An Act to make provision for and in connection with the abolition of the Audit Commission for Local Authorities and the National Health Service in England; to make provision about the accounts of local and certain other public authorities and the auditing of those accounts; to make provision about the appointment, functions and regulation of local auditors; to make provision about data matching; to make provision about examinations by the Comptroller and Auditor General relating to English local and other public authorities; to make provision about the publication of information by smaller authorities; to make provision about compliance with codes of practice on local authority publicity; to make provision about access to meetings and documents of local government bodies; to make provision about council tax referendums; to make provision about polls consequent on parish meetings; and for connected purposes.
European Union (Approvals) Act 2014 (repealed)	2014 c. 3	30 January 2014
An Act to make provision approving for the purposes of section 8 of the European Union Act 2011 (Note: European Union Act 2011 (c. 12)) certain draft decisions under Article 352 of the Treaty on the Functioning of the European Union. (Repealed by European Union (Withdrawal) Act 2018 (c. 16))
Transparency of Lobbying, Non-Party Campaigning and Trade Union Administration Act 2014	2014 c. 4	30 January 2014
An Act to make provision for establishing and maintaining a register of persons carrying on the business of consultant lobbying and to require those persons to be entered in the register; to make provision about expenditure and donations for political purposes; to make provision about the Electoral Commission's functions with respect to compliance with requirements imposed by or by virtue of enactments; to make provision relating to a trade union's duty to maintain a register of members under section 24 of the Trade Union and Labour Relations (Consolidation) Act 1992; (Note: Trade Union and Labour Relations (Consolidation) Act 1992 (c. 52)) and for connected purposes.
Supply and Appropriation (Anticipation and Adjustments) Act 2014	2014 c. 5	13 March 2014
An Act to authorise the use of resources for the years ending with 31 March 2008, 31 March 2009, 31 March 2010, 31 March 2011, 31 March 2012, 31 March 2013, 31 March 2014 and 31 March 2015; to authorise the issue of sums out of the Consolidated Fund for the years ending with 31 March 2013, 31 March 2014 and 31 March 2015; and to appropriate the supply authorised by this Act for the years ending with 31 March 2008, 31 March 2009, 31 March 2010, 31 March 2011, 31 March 2012, 31 March 2013 and 31 March 2014.
Children and Families Act 2014	2014 c. 6	13 March 2014
An Act to make provision about children, families, and people with special educational needs or disabilities; to make provision about the right to request flexible working; and for connected purposes.
National Insurance Contributions Act 2014	2014 c. 7	13 March 2014
An Act to make provision in relation to national insurance contributions; and for connected purposes.
Citizenship (Armed Forces) Act 2014	2014 c. 8	13 March 2014
An Act to make provision in connection with applications for naturalisation as a British citizen made by members or former members of the armed forces.
International Development (Gender Equality) Act 2014	2014 c. 9	13 March 2014
An Act to promote gender equality in the provision by the Government of development assistance and humanitarian assistance to countries outside the United Kingdom, and for connected purposes.
Leasehold Reform (Amendment) Act 2014	2014 c. 10	13 March 2014
An Act to amend the Leasehold Reform, Housing and Urban Development Act 1993 (Note: Leasehold Reform, Housing and Urban Development Act 1993 (c. 28)) in relation to the permitted signatories of notices; and for connected purposes.
Offender Rehabilitation Act 2014	2014 c. 11	13 March 2014
An Act to make provision about the release, and supervision after release, of offenders; to make provision about the extension period for extended sentence prisoners; to make provision about community orders and suspended sentence orders; and for connected purposes.
Anti-social Behaviour, Crime and Policing Act 2014	2014 c. 12	13 March 2014
An Act to make provision about anti-social behaviour, crime and disorder, including provision about recovery of possession of dwelling-houses; to make provision amending the Dangerous Dogs Act 1991, (Note: Dangerous Dogs Act 1991 (c. 65)) the Police Act 1997, (Note: Police Act 1997 (c. 50)) Schedules 7 and 8 to the Terrorism Act 2000, (Note: Terrorism Act 2000 (c. 11)) the Extradition Act 2003 (Note: Extradition Act 2003 (c. 41)) and Part 3 of the Police Reform and Social Responsibility Act 2011; (Note: Police Reform and Social Responsibility Act 2011 (c. 13)) to make provision about firearms, about sexual harm and violence and about forced marriage; to make provision about the police, the Independent Police Complaints Commission and the Serious Fraud Office; to make provision about invalid travel documents; to make provision about criminal justice and court fees; and for connected purposes.
Northern Ireland (Miscellaneous Provisions) Act 2014	2014 c. 13	13 March 2014
An Act to make provision about donations, loans and related transactions for political purposes in connection with Northern Ireland; to amend the Northern Ireland Assembly Disqualification Act 1975 (Note: Northern Ireland Assembly Disqualification Act 1975 (c. 25)) and the Northern Ireland Act 1998; (Note: Northern Ireland Act 1998 (c. 47)) to make provision about the registration of electors and the administration of elections in Northern Ireland; and to make miscellaneous amendments in the law relating to Northern Ireland.
Co-operative and Community Benefit Societies Act 2014	2014 c. 14	14 May 2014
An Act to consolidate certain enactments relating to co-operative societies, community benefit societies and other societies registered or treated as registered under the Industrial and Provident Societies Act 1965, (Note: Industrial and Provident Societies Act 1965 (c. 12)) with amendments to give effect to recommendations of the Law Commission and the Scottish Law Commission.
Deep Sea Mining Act 2014	2014 c. 15	14 May 2014
An Act to make provision about deep sea mining; and for connected purposes.
Inheritance and Trustees' Powers Act 2014	2014 c. 16	14 May 2014
An Act to make further provision about the distribution of estates of deceased persons and to amend the law relating to the powers of trustees.
Gambling (Licensing and Advertising) Act 2014	2014 c. 17	14 May 2014
An Act to make provision about the licensing and advertising of gambling.
Intellectual Property Act 2014	2014 c. 18	14 May 2014
An Act to make provision about intellectual property.
Pensions Act 2014	2014 c. 19	14 May 2014
An Act to make provision about pensions and about benefits payable to people in connection with bereavement; and for connected purposes.
Defence Reform Act 2014	2014 c. 20	14 May 2014
An Act to make provision in connection with any arrangements that may be made by the Secretary of State with respect to the provision to the Secretary of State of defence procurement services; to make provision relating to defence procurement contracts awarded, or amended, otherwise than as the result of a competitive process; to make provision in relation to the reserve forces of the Crown; and for connected purposes.
Water Act 2014	2014 c. 21	14 May 2014
An Act to make provision about the water industry; about compensation for modification of licences to abstract water; about main river maps; about records of waterworks; for the regulation of the water environment; about the provision of flood insurance for household premises; about internal drainage boards; about Regional Flood and Coastal Committees; and for connected purposes.
Immigration Act 2014	2014 c. 22	14 May 2014
An Act to make provision about immigration law; to limit, or otherwise make provision about, access to services, facilities and employment by reference to immigration status; to make provision about marriage and civil partnership involving certain foreign nationals; to make provision about the acquisition of citizenship by persons unable to acquire it because their fathers and mothers were not married to each other and provision about the removal of citizenship from persons whose conduct is seriously prejudicial to the United Kingdom's vital interests; and for connected purposes.
Care Act 2014	2014 c. 23	14 May 2014
An Act to make provision to reform the law relating to care and support for adults and the law relating to support for carers; to make provision about safeguarding adults from abuse or neglect; to make provision about care standards; to establish and make provision about Health Education England; to establish and make provision about the Health Research Authority; to make provision about integrating care and support with health services; and for connected purposes.
House of Lords Reform Act 2014	2014 c. 24	14 May 2014
An Act to make provision for resignation from the House of Lords; and to make provision for the expulsion of Members of the House of Lords in specified circumstances.
Supply and Appropriation (Main Estimates) Act 2014	2014 c. 25	17 July 2014
An Act to authorise the use of resources for the year ending with 31 March 2015; to authorise both the issue of sums out of the Consolidated Fund and the application of income for that year; and to appropriate the supply authorised for that year by this Act and by the Supply and Appropriation (Anticipation and Adjustments) Act 2014. (Note: Supply and Appropriation (Anticipation and Adjustments) Act 2014 (c. 5))
Finance Act 2014	2014 c. 26	17 July 2014
An Act to grant certain duties, to alter other duties, and to amend the law relating to the National Debt and the Public Revenue, and to make further provision in connection with finance.
Data Retention and Investigatory Powers Act 2014	2014 c. 27	17 July 2014
An Act to make provision, in consequence of a declaration of invalidity made by the Court of Justice of the European Union in relation to Directive 2006/24/EC, (Note: Data Retention Directive (Directive 2006/24/EC)) about the retention of certain communications data; to amend the grounds for issuing interception warrants, or granting or giving certain authorisations or notices, under Part 1 of the Regulation of Investigatory Powers Act 2000; (Note: Regulation of Investigatory Powers Act 2000 (c. 23)) to make provision about the extra-territorial application of that Part and about the meaning of "telecommunications service" for the purposes of that Act; to make provision about additional reports by the Interception of Communications Commissioner; to make provision about a review of the operation and regulation of investigatory powers; and for connected purposes.
Childcare Payments Act 2014	2014 c. 28	17 December 2014
An Act to make provision for and in connection with the making of payments to persons towards the costs of childcare; and to restrict the availability of an exemption from income tax in respect of the provision for an employee of childcare, or vouchers for obtaining childcare, under a scheme operated by or on behalf of the employer.
Wales Act 2014	2014 c. 29	17 December 2014
An Act to make provision about elections to and membership of the National Assembly for Wales; to make provision about the Welsh Assembly Government; to make provision about the setting by the Assembly of rates of income tax to be paid by Welsh taxpayers and about the devolution of taxation powers to the Assembly; to make related amendments to Part 4A of the Scotland Act 1998; (Note: Scotland Act 1998 (c. 46)) to make provision about borrowing by the Welsh Ministers; to make miscellaneous amendments in the law relating to Wales; and for connected purposes.
Taxation of Pensions Act 2014	2014 c. 30	17 December 2014
An Act to make provision in connection with the taxation of pensions.

== Local acts ==
Short title	Citation	Royal assent
Long title
Hertfordshire County Council (Filming on Highways) Act 2014	2014 c. i	30 January 2014
An Act to confer powers on Hertfordshire County Council in relation to filming on highways; and for related purposes.
Buckinghamshire County Council (Filming on Highways) Act 2014	2014 c. ii	17 December 2014
An Act to confer powers on Buckinghamshire County Council in relation to filming on highways; and for related purposes.

== See also ==
- List of acts of the Parliament of the United Kingdom
