= Taxation of Pensions Act 2014 =

- Act of Parliament
- Parliament of the United Kingdom
- Long title: An Act to make provision in connection with the taxation of pensions.
- Citation: 2014 c. 30
- Introduced by: George Osborne MP, Chancellor of the Exchequer (Commons); Lord Newby (Lords)
- Territorial extent: All of the United Kingdom

Dates
- Royal assent: 17 December 2014
- Commencement: 17 December 2014 and 6 April 2015

Status: Current legislation

History of passage through Parliament

Text of statute as originally enacted

Revised text of statute as amended

The Taxation of Pensions Act 2014 (c. 30) is an act of the Parliament of the United Kingdom that received royal assent on 17 December 2014, after being introduced on 14 October 2014. The purpose of the act was to allow greater flexibility by removing certain restrictions relating to pension annuities becoming entitled on or after 6 April 2015 and authorising one-off pension payments not made through a drawdown fund.

== Overview ==
The main provisions of the act were:

- Members of a registered pension scheme are able from 6 April 2015 to draw down their full pension fund as a single lump sum, known as the Uncrystallised Funds Pensions Lump Sum, of which 25% will be tax free. Therefore, no longer meaning that pensioners have to purchase an annuity on retirement.
- A new drawdown facility known as the Flexi-access drawdown allows pensioners from 6 April 2015 to withdraw any amount when they reach a normal pension age, and allows any amount to be put into a short term annuity lasting 5 years or less.
- As anti-avoidance legislation pensioners using the flexible opinions above have a reduced tax free annual pension contribution allowance of £10,000 per annum, thus preventing individuals from flexibly withdrawing their pot and reinvesting in a defined contribution scheme.
- That the 55% tax charge that applies on payment of most lump sum death benefits is abolished, in its place anyone who dies below the age of 75 will be able to leave unused fund to their beneficiaries tax free. For those who die above the age of 75 the used funds can be passed on either as a flexibly accessible pension fund or paid out as a lump sum subject to a tax rate of 45%.

== See also ==
- List of legislation in the United Kingdom
