= Deep Sea Mining Act 2014 =

Act of the Parliament of the United Kingdom

Deep Sea Mining Act 2014 (Note: Section 2(4).)
- Act of Parliament
- Parliament of the United Kingdom
- Long title: An Act to make provision about deep sea mining; and for connected purposes.
- Citation: 2014 c. 15
- Introduced by: Sheryll Murray MP (Commons); Baroness Wilcox (Lords)
- Territorial extent: England and Wales; Scotland; Northern Ireland; (Note: Section 2(1)–(2).)

Dates
- Royal assent: 14 May 2014
- Commencement: 14 July 2014 (Note: Section 2(3).)
Other legislation
Amends	Deep Sea Mining (Temporary Provisions) Act 1981

Status: Current legislation

History of passage through Parliament

Text of statute as originally enacted

Revised text of statute as amended

The Deep Sea Mining Act 2014 (c. 15) is an act of the Parliament of the United Kingdom. It received royal assent on 14 May 2014.

== Passage ==
It is unusual as this bill passed through parliament as a private member's bill, it was sponsored by Sheryll Murray MP and Baroness Wilcox.

== Provisions ==
The act creates a legal framework for the deep sea mining industry. The act enables the deep sea mining sector to be regulated in a modern way and aims to prevent damage to the environment.

The act amends the Deep Sea Mining (Temporary Provisions) Act 1981 so that the UK government can grant licences for deep sea mining, and so that the 1981 act is aligned with the United Nations Convention on the Law of the Sea.

== Reception ==
The Shadow Foreign Office Minister Kerry McCarthy criticised the legislation for not providing enough environmental protections.
