= Copyright Act 1956 =

Act of the Parliament of the United Kingdom

Copyright Act 1956 (Note: Section 51(1).)
- Act of Parliament
- Parliament of the United Kingdom
- Long title: An Act to make new provision in respect of copyright and related matters, in substitution for the provisions of the Copyright Act, 1911, and other enactments relating thereto; to amend the Registered Designs Act, 1949, with respect to designs related to artistic works in which copyright subsists, and to amend the Dramatic and Musical Performers' Protection Act, 1925; and for purposes connected with the matters aforesaid.
- Citation: 4 & 5 Eliz. 2. c. 74
- Territorial extent: United Kingdom (Note: Section 51(3).); Hong Kong (in relation to works made before 1997)

Dates
- Royal assent: 5 November 1956
- Commencement: 1 June 1957 (Note: Section 51(2). The Copyright Act 1956 (Commencement) Order 1957.)
- Repealed: 1 August 1989 (Note: The Copyright, Designs and Patents Act 1988 (Commencement No. 1) Order 1989.)
Other legislation
Amends	See § Repealed enactments
Repeals/revokes	See § Repealed enactments
Amended by	[[[Dramatic and Musical Performers' Protection Act 1958]]; Public Records Act 1958; Statute Law (Repeals) Act 1974; Copyright Act 1956 (Amendment) Act 1982; Statute Law (Repeals) Act 1986; Sentencing Act 2020
Repealed by	Copyright, Designs and Patents Act 1988

Status: Repealed

Text of statute as originally enacted

The Copyright Act 1956 (4 & 5 Eliz. 2. c. 74) was an act of the Parliament of the United Kingdom which received its royal assent on 5 November 1956. The act expanded copyright law in the UK and was passed in order to bring copyright law of the United Kingdom in line with international copyright law and technological developments.

== Provisions ==
=== Repealed enactments ===
Section 50(2) of the act repealed 6 enactments, listed in the ninth schedule to the act.

Citation	Short title	Extent of repeal
25 & 26 Vict. c. 68	Fine Arts Copyright Act 1862	The whole act.
2 Edw. 7. c. 15	Musical (Summary Proceedings) Copyright Act 1902	The whole act.
6 Edw. 7. c. 36	Musical Copyright Act 1906	The whole act.
1 & 2 Geo. 5. c. 46	Copyright Act 1911	The whole act, except sections fifteen, thirty-four and thirty-seven thereof.
18 & 19 Geo. 5. c. lii	Copyright Order Confirmation (Mechanical Instruments: Royalties) Act 1928	The whole act.
11 & 12 Geo. 6. c. 7	Ceylon Independence Act 1947	Paragraph 10 of the Second Schedule.

== Subsequent developments ==
Section 45 of, and the sixth schedule to, the act was repealed by section 9(3) of the Dramatic and Musical Performers' Protection Act 1958 (6 & 7 Eliz. 2. c. 44), which came into force on 23 August 1958.

Section 50(2) of, and schedule 9 to, the act were repealed by section 1 of, and part XI of the schedule to, the Statute Law (Repeals) Act 1974, which came into force on 27 June 1974.

The whole act was repealed by section 303(2) of, and schedule 8 to, the Copyright, Designs and Patents Act 1988, which came into force on 1 August 1989.

== See also ==
- Statute of Anne
- Copyright Act 1842
- Copyright Act 1911
- Copyright, Designs and Patents Act 1988
- Copyright law of the United Kingdom
- Berne Convention for the Protection of Literary and Artistic Works
