= Designer Guild Ltd v Russell Williams (Textiles) Ltd =

Designers Guild Limited v. Russell Williams (Textiles) Limited (Trading As Washington DC)
- Court: House of Lords
- Decided: November 23, 2000
- Citation: [2001] E.C.D.R. 10
- Transcript: transcript

Court membership
- Judges sitting: Lord Bingham of Cornhill; Lord Hoffmann; Lord Hope of Craighead; Lord Millett; Lord Scott of Foscote

Designer Guild Limited v. Russell Williams (Textiles) Limited, is a leading House of Lords case on what constitutes copying in copyright infringement cases. The House of Lords considered whether there was infringement of a fabric design. Although both the copyrighted work and the infringing design were different in detail, the overall impression of the designs was the same. This decision is significant because the House of Lords ruled that copyright infringement is dependent on whether the defendant copied a substantial portion of the original work, rather than whether the two works look the same. The outcome suggests that in the United Kingdom the overall impression of a copyrighted work is protected if the copied features involved the labour, skill and originality of the author's work, even if the copyrighted work and infringing work are different in detail.

== Background of case ==
Designers Guild Limited (“DGL”) and Russell Williams (Textiles) Limited (“RWT”) both design and sell fabrics and wallpapers. DGL held a copyright in its Ixia design. DGL accused RWT of copyright infringement, alleging that the RWT design, Marguerite, copied Ixia. Both designs included a combination of flowers and stripes, a similar style of painting, and use of the resist effect (part of the stripe color shows through the flower petals).

Under section 16(3) of the Copyright, Designs and Patents Act 1988, infringement will be found if there is copying of the work as a whole or any substantial part of it. There were two issues at the trial:

- Did the designers of Marguerite copy from the Ixia design?
- Did what had been copied amount to the whole or substantial part of Ixia?

The deputy judge of the Chancery Division found that RWT's Marguerite design had been copied from DGL's Ixia design and that there had been copying of a substantial part. The judge identified the copied features as: the combination and relation of flowers and stripes, the manner in which they were painted, and the “resist effect”. The judge determined that the combination of these features formed a substantial part of the Ixia design.

On appeal, RWT challenged the judge's finding that the copied features formed a substantial part of the Ixia design. The issue of copying was not challenged. The Court of Appeal upheld RWT's challenge to the finding of substantiality. DGL appealed.

== The Court's decision ==
The House of Lords allowed DGL's appeal, finding no reason to interfere with the judge's decision.

=== Lord Bingham of Cornhill ===
Lord Bingham of Cornhill found that the Court of Appeal erred in overruling the decision of the judge because:

- The Court of Appeal's analysis of the dissimilarities between the two designs failed to give effect to the judge's finding that there had been copying, which was not an issue on appeal. This was in error because a finding of copying was crucial to concluding the issue of substantiality.
- The Court of Appeal inappropriately addressed the issue of substantiality in the manner of a first instance court.

Lord Hope of Craighead agreed with these reasons and also allowed the appeal.

=== Lord Hoffmann ===
Lord Hoffmann found that the Court of Appeal erred in overruling the decision of the judge because:

- The Court of Appeal wrongfully engaged in a visual comparison. The issue was whether the features which the judge found to be copied from the Ixia design formed a substantial part of this work. Once these features had been identified, there was no need to revisit whether or not the two designs looked alike.
- The Court of Appeal erred by dissecting the component parts of the designs, rather than considering their cumulative effect because it ignored the judge's findings of fact.
- The Court of Appeal erred in its belief that the defendant did not copy a substantial part of the expression of the Ixia design, but rather the idea. The techniques used in Ixia to form the expression required sufficient skill and labor from the author for the judge to find that they formed a substantial part of the originality of Ixia.
- The judge was in a better position to assess the substantiality issue because he assessed the credibility of the expert witnesses with experience identifying which features of the design produce a specific visual effect.

Lord Hoffmann provided guidance on the concept that British copyright law protects the expression of the idea rather than the idea itself. He noted two propositions about the distinction between ideas and expression:

1. "The first is that a copyright work may express certain ideas which are not protected because they have no connection with the literary, dramatic, musical or artistic nature of the work. . . . However striking or original [the idea] may be, others are (in the absence of patent protection) free to express it in works of their own."
2. "The other proposition is that certain ideas expressed by a copyright work may not be protected because, although they are ideas of a literary, dramatic or artistic nature, they are not original, or so commonplace as not to form a substantial part of the work."

Lord Hoffmann concluded that the Ixia expression was more than just the idea of a flower-stripe combination, and therefore original enough to represent the author's skill and labour and form a substantial part of the originality of the work. A writer for the European Intellectual Property Review explained that while he did not explicitly state it, Lord Hoffmann provided a new test for whether a substantial part of the original work was copied. The proposed test is whether the part taken would itself attract copyright protection.

=== Lord Millett ===
Lord Millett found that the Court of Appeal erred overruling the decision of the judge because:

- The Court of Appeal did not agree with the judge's finding that the work had been copied and as a result were too quick to reject the judge's finding of substantiality, which as a matter of impression, appellate courts should hesitate to do.
- The Court of Appeal erred in its understanding of the visual comparison. The question of substantiality addresses whether the copied feature is a substantial part of the copyrighted work. It may not be a substantial part of the defendant's work. Therefore, even if the defendant's design looked different from Ixia, it does not mean that the copyright was not infringed.
