= Copyright law of the United Kingdom =

Under the law of the United Kingdom, a copyright is an intangible property right subsisting in certain qualifying subject matter. Copyright law is governed by the Copyright, Designs and Patents Act 1988 (the 1988 Act), as amended from time to time. On 12 September 2018, the European Parliament approved new copyright rules to help secure the rights of writers and musicians, although since then, the UK has left the EU.

== Background ==
Copyright protection in Britain dates back to the 1556 Charter of the Worshipful Company of Stationers and Newspaper Makers. The Licensing of the Press Act 1662 gave publishers exclusive printing rights, but did not give any rights to authors. Parliament failed to renew the Act in 1694, primarily to remove monopoly and encourage a free press.

The modern concept of copyright originated in Great Britain, in the year 1710, with the Statute of Anne. This Act prescribed a copyright term of fourteen years, and let the author renew for another fourteen years, after which the work went into the public domain. Over the years, additional acts and case law steadily refined the definitions of what could be protected, including derivative works, and the degree of protection given. Under the Copyright Act 1842 the copyright period lasted for the lifetime of the author plus 7 years, or for 42 years from first publication, whichever was longer.

The Copyright Act 1911 (1 & 2 Geo. 5. c. 46) codified the state of copyright law for the United Kingdom of Great Britain and Ireland and the rest of the British Empire, and extended the copyright term to life of the author plus 50 years. The Copyright Act 1956 extended protection to film. For Britain and Northern Ireland, the protections are now governed by the Copyright, Designs and Patents Act 1988, which came into force on 1 August 1989, apart from some of its minor provisions. Amendments have been made to it, mostly originating from the Copyright law of the European Union, and the laws have been interpreted by case law. Copyright was amended again in 1995, extending the term of copyright to life of the author plus 70 years.

== Framework ==
Copyright claims typically require consideration of the following issues:

- Subsistence: Does copyright subsist in the proposed subject matter?
- Ownership: Is the claimant the owner of the copyright? If so, is the claimant a sole or joint owner?
- Incidents of ownership: What rights flow from ownership? What is the term of the owner's monopoly?
- Infringement: Has there been primary or secondary infringement?
  - Primary infringement: Has the defendant committed (or authorised another to commit) a 'restricted act' without the consent of the owner?
  - Secondary infringement: Has the defendant committed an act amounting to secondary infringement; for example, possessed or sold an infringing article in the course of business?
- Defences: Does the defendant have a defence?
- Remedies: What is the appropriate remedy for the infringement?

== Subsistence of copyright ==
Copyright arises automatically, without the need for registration. As the law currently stands, the United Kingdom has a closed-list system: copyright only subsists in the certain enumerated subject matter. The eight classes of subject matter are listed in section 1 (1) of the Copyright, Designs and Patents Act 1988. It is a fundamental principle of copyright law that copyright subsists in the expression of an idea, not in an idea itself.

=== Qualification for protection ===
The 1911 Act provides that an individual's work is automatically under copyright, by operation of law, as soon as it leaves their mind and is embodied in some physical form: be it a novel, a painting, a musical work written in manuscript, or an architectural schematic. This remains the legal position under the Schedules of the 1956 Act and of the 1988 Act.

Once reduced to physical form, provided it is an original work (in the sense of not having been copied from an existing work), then the copyright in it vests automatically in (i.e. is owned by) the author: the person who put the concept into material form. There are exceptions to this rule, depending upon the nature of the work, if it was created in the course of employment.

In order to grant copyright protection to computer databases, UK copyright law recognises the element of labour and skill used in compiling them, even though they are not in truth original works (being entirely derived from existing records), applying a principle sometimes called the 'Sweat of the Brow' doctrine; they are also protected by database right (see below).

The term 'Unfair Use' is sometimes applied in that context, to refer to the use of a work into which someone has invested a lot of skill and labour, but where little or no originality is present. This is mainly in the case of reproduction photography, or the retouching of artistic works that are out of copyright, or for simple computer databases, such works not being original.

A work, other than a broadcast, can qualify for copyright protection in either of two ways: by the nationality of the author, or by the country of first publication.

A work qualifies for copyright protection if made after 1 June 1957 (the date on which the Copyright Act 1956 came into force), if its author is:

1. a British citizen, a British dependent territories citizen, a British National (Overseas), a British subject, a British protected person, or
2. an individual resident or domiciled in the United Kingdom, or in another country to which the qualification clause extends, or
3. a body incorporated under the law of a part of the United Kingdom, or another country to which the qualification clause extends.

Alternatively, a work can qualify for copyright protection if its first publication took place:

1. in the United Kingdom, or
2. in another country to which the qualification clause extends.

However, a work made before 1 June 1957, can only qualify for copyright protection by its country of first publication; not by the author's nationality.

A broadcast, if made after 1 June 1957, qualifies for protection if:

1. it is made in the United Kingdom, or
2. it is made in another country to which the qualification clause extends.

Lists of the countries which trigger qualification are published in Statutory Instruments periodically. They are, in point of fact, those countries which have acceded to the Berne Copyright Convention.

=== First publication ===
The first publication is defined as the first occasion that a work is published anywhere. But if a work is simultaneously published in several countries, all within a 30-day period, each of those countries is treated as the country of first publication.

For example, if a work is first published in the United Kingdom, but is published in Canada, Australia, and New Zealand within the following 30 days, all those countries are treated under UK law as being the country where the work was first published.

This used to be of importance, prior to 1957, for in those days first publication was the only possible way to obtain a copyright. It became much less important because of the Copyright Act 1956, which grants copyright in the United Kingdom to any work if the author is a British citizen or is resident in Britain, or is a citizen of (or resident in) a Berne Convention country.

== Works eligible for protection ==
The works in which copyright can subsist are typically divided into two sub-classes. Works in the first sub-class are known as authorial works:

- Original literary works (for the purposes of UK law, this includes software);
- Original dramatic works;
- Original musical works; and
- Original artistic works.

For copyright to subsist in these works, the work itself must be 'original'. This is traditionally seen as requiring that the author exercised skill, labour, and judgment in its production. Three of these works are also subject to a fixation requirement: a literary, dramatic, or musical work must be recorded. It is immaterial whether this was done without the author's permission.

The second sub-class of works in which copyright subsist are often known as neighbouring or entrepreneurial works:

- Films;
- Sound recordings;
- Broadcasts; and
- Typographical arrangements of published editions.

=== Multiple copyrights ===
It is possible for more than one copyright to subsist in respect of a single item. For example, if a musician were to release an album the following copyrights might subsist in respect of that item:

- Copyright in the sound recording
- Copyright of the sheet music being played on the sound recording
- Copyright in the lyrics
- Copyright in the cover artwork
- Copyright in the text of the insert

=== Cinema films ===
Cinema films made before 1 June 1957, the date on which the Copyright Act 1956 came into force, are not protected as film. They are however protected under the Copyright Act 1911 as dramatic works and as a series of photographs.

=== Broadcast copyright ===
In the United Kingdom, there are two distinct classes of broadcast: those made before and those made after the commencement of the Copyright Act 1956. Under the Copyright Act 1911, passed before the invention of the radio or television broadcasting, no copyright existed in a broadcast, and this was not modified until the Act of 1956. Until the 1950s not even the broadcaster had the technical means of recording or replaying a broadcast signal, so there had been no need to make provisions for copyright protection.

The Copyright Act 1956 is not retrospective in its effect, so a television or radio broadcast made before 1 July 1957 (the commencement date of the act) has no broadcast copyright. Wireless (radio) broadcasts prior to 1 June 1957 are therefore not protected at all. The Copyright 1911 made no provision for them, as broadcasting had not been invented when the act was passed. Broadcasts by cable prior to 1 January 1985 are not protected at all either. Neither of the acts of 1911 and 1956 made provision for broadcasts by cable, as they had not been defined and protected as either "works" or "broadcasts" of either act.

In the case of a broadcast made after the commencement of the Copyright Act 1956, the copyright in a broadcast programme expires 50 years from the end of the year in which it is broadcast. Repeating such a broadcast does not extend the period of copyright, whether the repeat is during or after the 50-year copyright period.

The 1956 act restricts only two matters: it prohibits recording the broadcast for commercial purposes, and it prohibits causing the live broadcast (if it is a television broadcast) to be seen in public by a paying audience.

These provisions were re-enacted in substantially the same terms in the Copyright, Designs and Patents Act 1988, in order to preserve the distinction (established in the Copyright Act 1956) between broadcasts made before and after 1 June 1957.

The 1988 act applies only to broadcasts made after it came into force on 1 August 1989. But it effects, in the main, merely a continuation of the existing law on broadcast copyright, on the same terms as established in the 1956 act, while adding protection for the new technology of cable television.

In the 1988 act, provision was made for the first time for material distributed by cable television, in the form of a separate copyright for cable programmes. This copyright lasts for the same period as broadcast copyright. However, there is no protection for cable programmes transmitted before 1 January 1985. Subsequent amendments to the 1988 act have now merged the definition of a cable programme into the definition of a broadcast.

==== Radio prior to 1988 ====
There is no copyright in a radio broadcast transmitted in the United Kingdom before 1 June 1957, the commencement date of the Copyright Act 1956. Prior to that act, there was no such thing as broadcast copyright in British law. The previous law was contained in the Copyright Act 1911, which was enacted before the invention of broadcasting.

The 1956 act is not retrospective in its effect. A radio broadcast made before 1 July 1957 (the commencement date of the 1956 act) has no broadcast copyright.

Under the terms of the 1956 act, broadcast copyright expires 50 years from the end of the year in which it was transmitted. The 50-year copyright period cannot be extended for such broadcasts. Repeating a broadcast does not extend the period of copyright, whether the repeat is during or after the 50-year copyright period.

Under the terms of the 1956 act, copyright in a radio broadcast is not infringed by recording it for non-commercial use. The act only prohibits recording a broadcast if done other than for private purposes (for example, if done for re-sale on tape or disc), and it also prohibits causing a live broadcast (but only if it is a television broadcast) to be seen in public by a paying audience.

In respect of the first point, a recording is not made for a commercial purpose (i.e. a non-private purpose) unless it is offered for sale; so where a recording was made for home use and is not subsequently offered for sale, at no stage is it used for a commercial purpose. In respect of the second point, where the broadcast is radio, not television, it does not fall within the terms of the restriction.

The effect is that it is not an infringement of copyright to record or copy a radio broadcast, made on or after 1 January 1959, unless it is done for commercial purposes (i.e. for payment).

The copyright law of the United Kingdom was not amended further until 1988; and the 1988 act has no application to a broadcast made before it came into force, on 1 August 1989.

The 1988 act is relevant to an earlier broadcast only in that it now expressly permits the making of a copy for private study. This strengthens the previous provision, in section 14 of the 1956 act, that permits a broadcast to be recorded for private purposes.

=== Sound recordings ===
Under the 1988 Act, copyright in a sound recording expires (a) 50 years after the recording is made if it is then still unpublished, or (b) if the recording is published during that period then 50 years from the date of publication, or (c) if during the initial 50 years the recording is played in public or communicated to the public then 50 years from the date of that communication or playing to the public, provided the author of the recording is an EEA citizen. Otherwise, the duration under the laws of the country of which the author is a national applies, unless such a duration would be longer than that given in UK law, or would be contrary to any treaty obligations of the UK with that country that was in force on 29 October 1994.

On 1 November 2013, the copyright in an unpublished sound recording was extended from 50 to 70 years, by the Copyright and Duration of Rights in Performances Regulations 2013. Thus a sound recording made by an individual, such as a musician, but which is not performed in public nor sold to the public on tape or disc, i.e. an unpublished recording, effectively acquired the same copyright extension as had previously been granted to unpublished literary works.

=== Publication right ===
If the copyright in an unpublished work has expired, the first publisher of that work gets copyright protection, but for only a short period. Works that qualify for publication right include literary, dramatic, musical, or artistic works or a film.

A publication right only exists if the publisher of the work is an EEA national and the work is first published in an EEA country. However, no publication right can be applied to works in which Parliamentary or Crown copyright existed previously.

Publication right lasts for 25 years from the first publication.

=== Database right ===
Database right is not a right that arises from the existence of copyright. It is entirely separate from the copyright and relates only to computer databases.

Database rights were created in 1996. Prior to that, under the 1988 Act, a computer database was treated as a literary work. In databases created before 27 March 1996, the copyright rules are the same as for any other literary work, and copyright lasts for the normal term of such a work. The effect of this is that copyright exists in the database if, and only if, the database's creation is the original work of the author.

For databases created after 27 March 1996, in addition to the ordinary literary copyright, a separate database right also exists. Database right exists if a substantial amount of work was required by the maker of the database to obtain the data in the database, verify the data, or present the database's contents. Database right is independent of any copyright in the contents of the database.

The maker of a database is the person who compiles the database. The maker of a database is the first owner of any database right arising. As with copyright, if an employee makes a database, then the employer is the first owner of any database right. The Crown owns a database right to databases compiled by an officer of the Crown in the course of his duties, and databases made under the direction of Parliament have the right assigned to the appropriate chamber of Parliament. If two or more people make a database, then the database right is jointly owned by those people.

Database right does not exist unless the makers of the database are EEA nationals; are resident in an EEA state; are incorporated bodies, with their central operations or principal place of business in the EEA, and the body has a registered office in an EEA state, or the legal entity's operations are linked to the economy of an EEA state; or are unincorporated bodies or partnerships with their central operations or principal place of business in the EEA.

Database right lasts for 15 years from the completion of the making of a database. If a database is made available to the public during that period, then the 15-year period lasts for 15 years from the time of making it available to the public. Any substantial change to a database causes the 15-year period to begin anew, as the changed database is regarded as effectively a fresh creation. Therefore, in theory, databases that regularly undergo substantial changes could enjoy (effectively) perpetual database right protection. If a database was created on or after 1 January 1983, and the database qualified for database right on 1 January 1998, that right lasts for 15 years from that date.

Database right is infringed if most or all of a database is extracted and reused without the consent of the owner, or if small portions of a database are repeatedly extracted and reused without the consent of the owner.

=== Artists resale right ===
In the case of artistic works, on 14 February 2006, a new intellectual property right known as the artist's resale right was created in the United Kingdom, by regulations made under the European Communities Act 1972. The right subsists for as long as copyright in an artistic work subsists and means that when a qualifying sale is made that the artist who created the work being sold is entitled to a royalty on the sale. The right is not assignable and it cannot be waived. The right can be transferred only by intestate succession or by will on death and becomes bona vacantia if no heirs exist.

The right is only exercisable by a qualifying individual or a qualifying body. A qualifying individual is either an EEA national or a national of a country which is defined in Schedule 2 to the order creating the right. A qualifying body is a charity within the United Kingdom or a charity that is based with the EEA or a country defined in Schedule 2 to the order. The right only covers original works or those works where a limited number of copies have been made under the direction of the author. A sale is only regarded as a resale if the price of the work being sold is greater than 1,000 and either the seller or buyer is acting in the capacity of a professional art dealer. There is a saving provision that allows for works purchased directly from the author for under 10,000 within the last three years to not fall under the resale right. The seller is jointly liable to pay the royalty to a relevant person. The relevant person is defined as one or more of the agents of the seller, the agent of the buyer, or the buyer where no agents exist. The relevant person must be a professional art dealer in order to be liable to pay the royalty. The holder of resale right on an artistic work has the right to obtain information to enable the payment of the royalty from any professional art dealers involved in the transaction when that request is made within three years of the transaction taking place. Where a sale takes place before 2010 only living authors are eligible for the royalty.

== Ownership ==
=== Authors and ownership ===
Unless an exception applies, the creator of a work is presumed to be the first owner of any copyright therein. Exceptions include where the work was created in the course of employment, or where the author is an officer or servant of the Crown.

In certain cases, the law presumes that a particular person is the author of a work. For example:

- In the case of a literary, dramatic, musical, or artistic work bearing a name, the named person
- In the case of the typographical arrangement of a published edition of a work, the publisher
- In the case of a sound recording, the producer
- In the case of a film, the producer and principal director

=== Joint authorship ===
If more than one person qualifies as an author then a work is one of joint authorship. Under the 1988 Act, a work of joint authorship is a work "produced by the collaboration of two or more authors in which the contribution of each author is not distinct from that of the other author or authors". Where the work is one of joint authorship, the consent of all copyright holders is required to avoid liability for infringement.

=== Assignment ===
Under UK copyright law, an author may assign his copyright rights to another person. It is standard practice for such assignments to be made in book publishing contracts, for example.

=== Works created in the course of employment ===
Where the apparent creator of the work composed it in the course of employment, the employer is treated as the first owner of the copyright. It is important to distinguish between works that are created whilst one is an employee, and works created whilst one is acting in the course of employment. It is only in the latter case that the exception applies.

It is possible for contracts of employment to contain express assignment clauses or to otherwise deal with the ownership of any intellectual property rights created by an employee.

== Copyright term ==
=== Historical background ===
Under the Copyright Act 1842 the copyright period lasted for the lifetime of the author plus 7 years, or for 42 years from first publication, whichever was longer.

The Copyright Act 1911 provided a longer copyright period, namely the life of the author plus 50 years, for works that were first published after 1 July 1912; thus the date of first publication became irrelevant, provided it was after July 1912. This was retained as the period of copyright under the Copyright Act 1956 and under the 1988 Act. However for photographs, section 21 of the 1911 act states that the duration of copyright is 50 years: "The term for which copyright shall subsist in photographs shall be fifty years from the making of the original negative from which the photograph was directly or indirectly derived...".

In 1995 the period of copyright was extended to the life of the author plus 70 years (as described above) for works that were, at that time, still within copyright anywhere within the European Economic Area. One effect of this was to impose a copyright extension of twenty years on all works (except photographs) that were made or published after 1911 by any person who had died after 1945, as the previous copyright period (of life plus 50 years) had not yet expired in the UK for someone who had died in 1945 or later. For photographs the 1911 act's limit of 50 years means that the lifetime of the photographer is irrelevant, and the negative must have been developed after 1945 for the change in rules to align them with other works, and thus extension, to apply.

Prior to the 1956 Act, the copyright laws took no account of the author's nationality, only of the country in which publication first occurred. Accordingly, a literary work published before 1 June 1956 had no copyright in the UK unless its first publication was in the UK. This was subject to the rule that the first publication could be simultaneous in more than one country, and thus copyright protection in the UK was obtained if publication occurred in the UK within one month of first publication abroad.

Nevertheless, literary works by British authors which first saw publication outside the UK prior to 1 June 1956, might have no copyright protection at all in the UK. Some recognition of foreign copyright existed but varied depending on which country the publication had first occurred in. In general, UK law recognised the copyright laws of foreign countries (i.e., non-Commonwealth countries) only if the other country was a party to the Berne Convention for the Protection of Literary and Artistic Works, and to some extent, this is still the case today.

=== Printed works ===
The term of author's copyright under the Copyright Act 1842 (which protected only printed works) was 42 years from the publication of the work, or the lifetime of the author, and seven years thereafter, whichever was the longer.

In the 1911 Act, the term of the author's copyright was extended to the lifetime of the author and 50 years thereafter; this remained the case under the 1956 Act and the 1988 Act.

The 1911 Act in effect extended the meaning of "author" so that this period of copyright applied to all types of works, not merely printed works.

Under the 1995 Regulations (set out below), the period of the author's copyright was further extended, to the lifetime of the author and 70 years thereafter. Those regulations were retrospective: they extended the copyright period for all works which were then still in copyright, and (controversially) revived the lapsed copyright of all authors who had died between 50 and 70 years previously (i.e. between 1925 and 1945).

Accordingly, copyright in literary, dramatic, musical, and artistic works currently expires 70 years from the end of the calendar year of the author's death. Where the work has more than one author, the copyright expires 70 years after the death of the last survivor of them.

The publisher's (separate) copyright, in the typographical arrangement of a printed work, lasts for 25 years from the end of the year in which publication occurred. This protects a publisher's copyright in all printed works: including books, magazines, newspapers, and other periodicals.

=== Other works ===
Other works (such as sculpture, architecture, etc.) will typically vary in copyright terms, depending on whether the author of the work is anonymous. If the author is unknown, the copyright period ends 70 years after the making of the work; or, if during that period the work is communicated to the public, 70 years after that date. If the author of the work is identifiable, the copyright in the work expires 70 years after the death of the author.

In the case of a motion picture, the period of copyright is determined by the life of the principal director, the author of the screenplay, the author of the dialogue, and the composer of any original music for the film. If that person is not a national of a European Economic Area (EEA) country, and the country of origin is not in the EEA (for example, the United States of America), the period of copyright is that provided by the film's country of origin, if that period is less than the normal period under UK law. If a film does not have any of the four persons mentioned above, the duration of its copyright is 50 years.

Computer-generated artistic works have copyright protection of 50 years from the creation of the work. As with other such copyrights, if the author is not an EEA national, and the country of origin is not an EEA state, then the duration of the country of origin applies, provided it does not exceed the normal period under UK law.

Broadcasts and sound recordings each have a different period of copyright: as detailed in the sections below.

=== International copyright ===
Notwithstanding that work qualifies for copyright protection in the UK, it will not be automatically entitled to the normal period of copyright (as set out above). It may be entitled to only a shorter period of protection.

Where the author is not British (by nationality or domicile), and the work was first published outside the United Kingdom (and not published in the UK within 30 days thereafter), the period of copyright protection provided by UK law is limited to that provided by the laws of the "country of origin" of the work.

The country of origin, in the case of a broadcast, is the country the transmission originates from; and in the case of other works is the country in which the work was first published.

If a work is first published in only one country, which is a party to the Berne Convention, then that is the country of origin.

If a work is published simultaneously (i.e. in more than one country, but all within 30 days), and one of the countries is a European Economic Area (EEA) country, then the EEA country is the country of origin (even if another is a Berne Convention country); but if none of them is an EEA country, and one of them is a Berne Convention country, then the Berne Convention country is the country of origin.

If two or more Berne Convention countries qualify, and not all of them are in the EEA (such as Canada, the US, or Australia), then the Berne Convention country with the shortest applicable copyright term determines the copyright term within the UK, if it is shorter than the normal term for such work under UK law.

If the country of first publication is not a Berne Convention member, or if the work is unpublished, the copyright term will vary depending on what type of work it is. Where the work is a film and the maker of the film is headquartered in a Berne Convention country, or is domiciled or resident in a Berne Convention country, then the country of origin is that country. If the work is a work of architecture in a Berne Convention country or an artistic work incorporated in a building in a Berne Convention country, then the country of origin is that country. Otherwise, the country of origin is the country of which the author is a national.

=== Extension of copyright term ===
Prior to 1 January 1996, the UK's general copyright term was the life of the author plus 50 years. The extension, to the life of the author plus 70 years, was introduced by The Duration of Copyright and Rights in Performances Regulations 1995 (SI 1995/3297), implementing the Copyright Duration Directive (No.93/98/EEC), to harmonize the duration of copyright throughout the European Economic Community.

It contained a controversial provision, which caused certain copyrights to revive; material that had been out of copyright came back into copyright. If the 1988 Act offered a shorter term of protection than the new Regulations, and if the work was still under copyright on 1 July 1995, anywhere in the EEA, then the copyright of that work was revived. But if the 1988 Act offered a longer term than the new regulations, then the old longer term still applied.

The normal practice of British law would have been to freeze the extension, applying it only to new works, rather than reviving expired copyrights.

Insofar as the change revived expired copyrights, it is now of no importance. The extension granted in 1995 was a 20-year extension, but more than 20 years have since elapsed. Accordingly, any expired copyrights which the 1995 Regulations revived will now have expired finally, as the latest date on which a revived copyright could have been extended until under the Regulations was 31 December 2015.

=== Posthumous works ===
If an unpublished work was published posthumously before the 1988 Act came into force, at a time when the author had been dead for more than 50 years (such that the copyright on his published works has already expired, which was then his lifetime plus 50 years), its copyright will be extended until 50 years from the end of the year of publication. As the 1988 Act came into force in August 1989, the latest date for the expiry of this extended copyright will be 2039.

If an unpublished work is published posthumously after the 1988 Act came into force, in 1989, at a time when the author has been dead for more than 50 years (such that the copyright on his published works has already expired), its copyright will be extended until 50 years from 1989, i.e. until the end of 2039. Thereby it is restricted to the same long-stop date as if it had been published before the Act came into force. Later amendments, made in 1995, have had the effect of altering this so that it now includes only posthumous works by authors who died more than 70 years before the Act came into force (i.e. died before 1918).

Therefore, if an unpublished work by an author who died before 1918 is published after the commencement of the 1988 Act, the copyright will expire at the end of 2039. However, if a work by an author who died before 1918, say 1870, was published in 1970 (i.e. before the 1988 Act), its copyright would expire 50 years after 1970, i.e. in 2020.

=== Crown copyright, Parliamentary copyright, and copyright of international organisations ===
Within the United Kingdom, the term of protection offered by Crown copyright, Parliamentary copyright, copyright of Acts and Measures, and copyright of international organisations is separate from that of ordinary copyright works.

Government material qualifies for either Crown copyright or Parliamentary copyright, or protection as an Act or Measure. Prior to the 1988 Act, Crown copyright also covered what is now separate Parliamentary copyright: such as bills in Parliament and the various devolved assemblies, and Acts and Measures.

Qualification conditions for Crown copyright, for works made after the commencement of the 1988 Act, mean that a work qualifies for protection if it was made by an officer of the Crown in the course of the officer's duties. Qualification conditions under the 1956 Act and the 1911 Act were somewhat different, but works that were Crown copyright at the commencement of the 1988 Act remain protected until the expiry of their original copyright term.

Crown copyright for artistic works is more complicated and is entangled in special treatment given to engravings and photographs. For artistic works made after the commencement of the 1988 Act, the rule is the same as for other works: 50 years after publication or 125 years after creation. An engraving created before commencement and published after commencement is in copyright for 50 years after publication. Copyright of an engraving created before commencement and unpublished expires at the end of 2039. Photographs taken between 1 June 1957 (the commencement date of the 1956 Act) and commencement, and published, expire 50 years after publication. Photographs taken between 1 June 1957, and commencement, unpublished, expire at the end of 2039. Photographs taken before 1 June 1957, expire 50 years after creation.

Parliamentary copyright applies to works made under the direction or control of either House of Parliament. Acts and Measures are defined as Acts of Parliament, Acts of the Scottish Parliament, Acts of the Northern Ireland Assembly, or Measures of the General Synod of the Church of England.

Copyright in a bill in Parliament, the Scottish Parliament, the Welsh Assembly or the Northern Ireland Assembly subsists from the moment a bill is introduced into the legislature to the moment it either fails to pass or receives Royal Assent. The copyright of Acts and Measures subsists from Royal Assent until 50 years later. Parliamentary copyright of a literary, musical, or dramatic work subsists until 50 years after the making of the work. Crown copyright of published literary, dramatic, or musical works expires 50 years after publication. Crown copyright of unpublished works expires the later of 125 years from creation or 31 December 2039. The latter provision is a transitional measure from the 1988 Act because that Act abolished perpetual copyright protection for unpublished materials. It is 50 years after the commencement of the 1988 Act plus the usual expiration extension to the end of the year.

Works of certain international organisations also qualify for protection under separate provisions in the 1988 Act. Lists of the international organisations that qualify are promulgated by statutory instruments. Organisations specified include the United Nations, Specialised Agencies of the United Nations, and the Organisation of American States.

Copyright in the case of the works of international organisations lasts for 50 years from the creation of the work.

=== Perpetual rights ===
A number of works and categories of works have special "perpetual" copyright status.

==== Royal prerogative ====
The power to hold and exercise all rights and privileges in connection with prerogative Crown copyright is managed by His Majesty's Stationery Office. Although Crown Copyright usually expires 50 years after publication, Section 171(b) of the Copyright, Designs and Patents Act 1988 made an exception for 'any right or privilege of the Crown' not written in an act of parliament, thus preserving the rights of the Crown under the unwritten royal prerogative.

Crown copyright applies in perpetuity to depictions of the Royal Arms and any of its constituent parts under the royal prerogative, and The National Archives restricts rights to reproduce them or to display them in film, television or theatre productions.

The King James Version of the Bible and the Book of Common Prayer are in the public domain in most of the world. However, in the United Kingdom, the Crown claims a perpetual right under the royal prerogative. This right – which is separate from a copyright – is a remnant of the Crown's historical monopoly over all printing and publishing in the United Kingdom. Under ancient royal charters and licences issued by letters patent, the printing, publishing, and importing of these books is restricted to Cambridge University Press and Oxford University Press in England, Wales, and Northern Ireland, and to Collins in Scotland.

==== Copyright Act 1775 ====
The Copyright Act 1775 established a type of perpetual copyright which allowed "the Two Universities in England, the Four Universities in Scotland, and the several colleges of Eton, Westminster, and Winchester to hold in Perpetuity their Copy Right in Books given to or bequeathed to the said Universities and Colleges for the advancement of useful learning and other purposes of education." All provisions granting copyright in perpetuity were abolished by the Copyright, Designs and Patents Act 1988 but under transitional arrangements, these printing rights do not fully expire until 2039.

==== Rights to royalties in J.M. Barrie's play Peter Pan ====
The UK copyright in J. M. Barrie's 1904 play Peter Pan originally expired at the end of 1987 (50 years after Barrie's death) but was revived in 1995 following the directive to harmonise copyright laws within the EU, which extended the term to the end of 2007.

However, even though the play's copyright has now once again expired, the Copyright, Designs, and Patents Act 1988 includes a statutory provision granting royalties in perpetuity to Great Ormond Street Hospital. Specifically, the Act provides that the hospital trustees are entitled to a royalty "in respect of any public performance, commercial publication or communication to the public of the whole or any substantial part of [the play] or an adaptation of it."

== Fair dealing and other exceptions and limitations ==
UK copyright law has a set of exceptions to copyright, only some of which are referred to as fair dealing. Database right has a similar set of exceptions. Fair dealing is much more restricted than the American concept of fair use. It only applies in tightly defined situations, and outside those situations, it is no defence at all against a lawsuit for copyright (or database right) infringement.

s29.—Research and Private Study Fair dealing with any in-copyright work for the purpose of research for a non-commercial purpose, does not infringe any copyright in the work, provided it is accompanied by a sufficient acknowledgement of the source. This exception includes a right to analyse in-copyright work – including analysis using computers, a process known as content mining, or text mining / data mining.
s30.—Criticism, review, quotation and news reporting Fair dealing with a work for the purpose of quotation, criticism or review, or news reporting does not infringe copyright in the work, provided it is accompanied by a sufficient acknowledgement, and provided the work has been made available to the public.
s30A.—Caricature, parody or pastiche Fair dealing with a work for the purposes of caricature, parody or pastiche is not an infringement of copyright.
s32.—Illustration for instruction Fair dealing with a work for the purposes of instruction does not infringe copyright as long as not for commercial purposes.

Under the 1988 Act, it was originally the case that any research use was fair dealing. However, in 2003, the 1988 Act was amended to exclude commercial research from the definition of fair dealing because of the restrictions provided for by the Information Society Directive (2001). Fair dealing for research should be accompanied by acknowledgement, if this is possible. Fair dealing with the typographical arrangement of a work for use in research or private study is also explicitly allowed. Also before the 2014 amendments to UK copyright law fair dealing for research only covered literary, dramatic, musical, and artistic works.

Database right fair dealing applies to the use of databases that have been made available to the public. If a person is a lawful user of a database, fair dealing is allowed for the extraction of substantial parts of a database, if the substantial part is extracted for teaching or research, not for commercial use, provided the source of the material is acknowledged.

Copyright in a database is not infringed if a person with the legal right to use part or all of a database do things necessary to use or access the contents of the database. Such permitted acts, which would otherwise infringe copyright, are allowed in spite of any licence agreement that purports to restrict such acts. Any terms of that type are null and void under UK law. Fair dealing for the purposes of private study or non-commercial research also does not infringe on copyright in a database.

With computer programs, fair dealing is explicitly excluded for decompilation or copying during decompilation. However, decompilation is allowed if it is to gain information vital to creating an independent program to interact with the decompiled program, provided that the information obtained by decompilation is not used for any other purpose. The observation of programs to determine their functions and the ideas underlying them is explicitly allowed while performing the normal functions of a program, such as loading and running it. As with database use, any terms which purport to restrict this sort of activity are null and void. Backup copies of computer programs are allowed if these are necessary for the lawful use of a computer program, and again restrictive licence terms are null and void.

For a long time, the legal position of services such as Internet caches was dubious under British law, with such copies technically being infringing. However, an amendment explicitly allows temporary copies of literary works, other than when in computer programs and databases; of dramatic works; of artistic works; of musical works; of typographical arrangements; and of films or sound recordings – provided that such temporary copies are necessary for a technical process, are transient or incidental, and are made only for the purpose of transmitting a work across a network between third parties, or for the lawful use of the work. That amendment eliminates the awkward position of the caching services of Internet service providers. It is in a similar vein to an exception for the incidental inclusion of a copyrighted work in an artistic work, sound recording, or film. However, the deliberate inclusion of a copyrighted work negates the exception.

Visually impaired and blind people were granted an exception with the passing of the Copyright (Visually Impaired Persons) Act 2002. Where a lawful copy of a literary, dramatic, musical, or artistic work or a published edition is possessed by a visually impaired person, and the lawful copy of the work is not accessible to the visually impaired person, copies of the work can be made such that the copies are accessible to the visually impaired person. However, the making of an accessible copy of a database is not allowed if the copyright in a database will be infringed, and musical works cannot be performed to make them accessible. The accessible copy must be accompanied by an acknowledgement and must carry a statement that it was made under the authority of the Copyright (Visually Impaired Persons) Act 2002's amendments to the 1988 Act. Furthermore, if accessible copies are available commercially in a form suitable for the person whom the accessible copy would be made for, then the exception does not apply. In 2014 as a result of the Hargreaves Review of Intellectual Property and Growth the exceptions for the visually impaired were updated to allow copying by people with any cognitive or physical disability.

The final major exception commonly met is that of recording broadcasts for time shifting. This was brought about by the rise of the video recorder in the early 1980s. The exception only applies to copies made for private and domestic use, not to copies made for re-sale.

Educational establishments, libraries, and archives have many exceptions that are applicable only to them, which are aimed at supporting education and research. They include exceptions for illustration for teaching, and preservation, as well as librarians being able to facilitate fair dealing for the users of a library who are physically located elsewhere.

In 2014 a new exception was introduced (Section 29A) to allow unlicensed web mining, text mining, and data mining. Because of the Information Society Directive, however, the use of this exception is limited to non-commercial research only.

=== Freedom of panorama ===
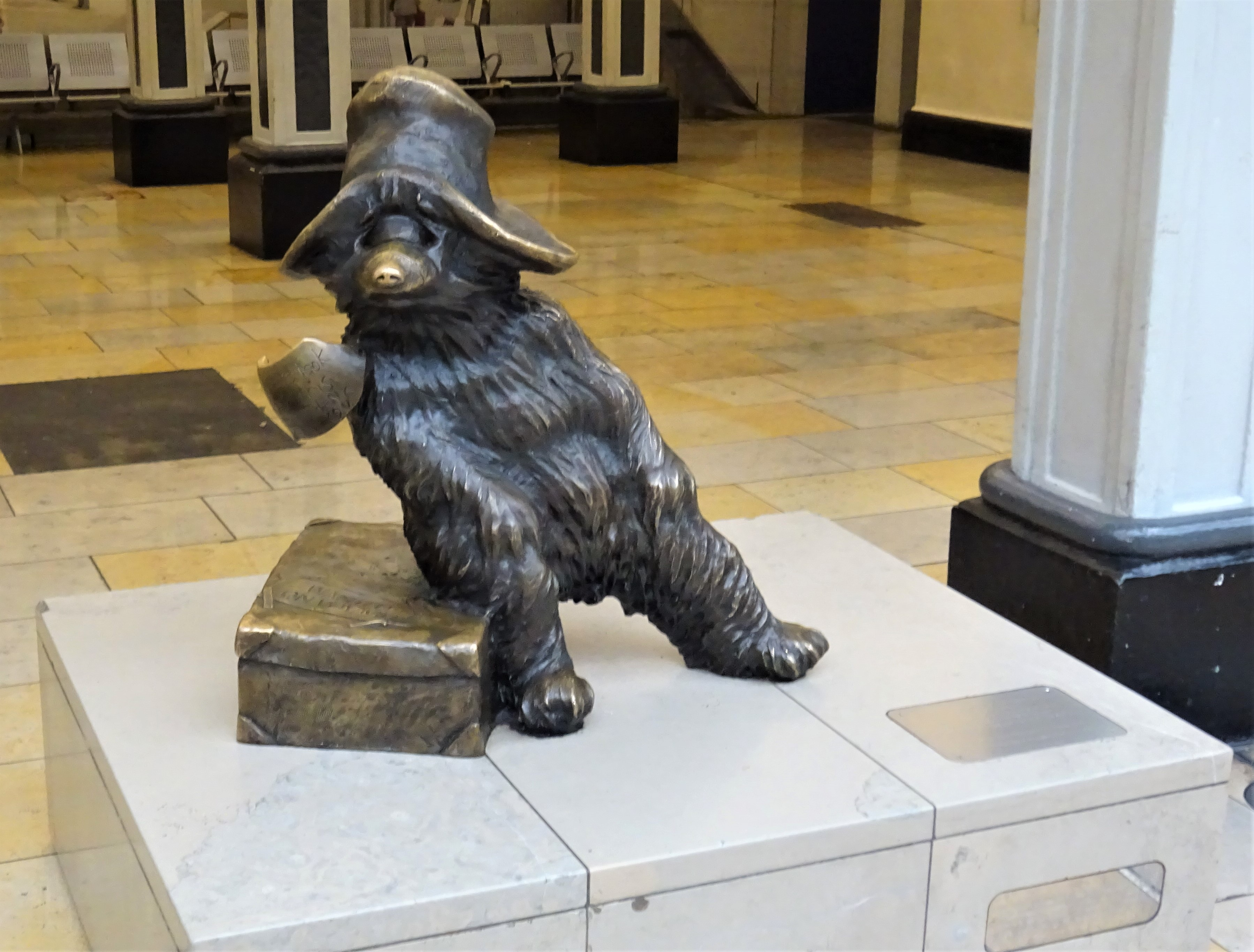
Paddington Bear statue at London Paddington station

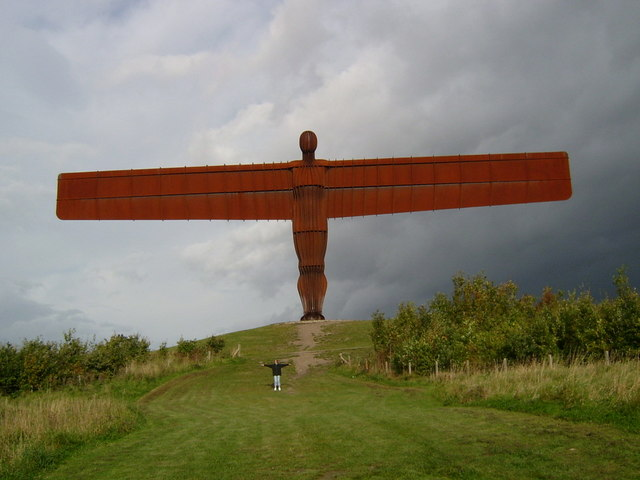
Angel of the North sculpture in Gateshead, Tyne and Wear

Under UK law, freedom of panorama covers all buildings as well as most three-dimensional works such as sculptures that are permanently situated in a public place. The freedom does not generally extend to two-dimensional copyright works such as murals or posters. A photograph which makes use of the freedom may be published in any way without breaching copyright.

Section 62 of the Copyright, Designs and Patents Act 1988 is broader than the corresponding provisions in many other countries, and allows photographers to take pictures of buildings, defined in section 4(2) as "any fixed structure, and a part of a building or fixed structure". There is no requirement that the building be in located a public place, nor does the freedom extend only to external views of the building.

Also allowed are photographs of certain artworks that are permanently situated in a public place or in premises open to the public, specifically sculptures, models for buildings, and "works of artistic craftsmanship". According to the standard reference work on copyright, Copinger and Skone James, the expression "open to the public" presumably includes premises to which the public are admitted only on licence or on payment. Again, this is broader than 'public place', which is the wording in many countries, and there is no restriction to works that are located outdoors.

Under the local approach to copyright, "works of artistic craftsmanship" are defined separately from "graphic works", and the freedom of section 62 does not apply to the latter. "Graphic works" are defined in section 4 as any painting, drawing, diagram, map, chart or plan, any engraving, etching, lithograph, woodcut or similar work. Accordingly, photographs may not freely be taken of artworks such as murals or posters even if they are permanently located in a public place.

The courts have not established a consistent test for what is meant by a "work of artistic craftsmanship", but Copinger suggests that the creator must be both a craftsman and an artist. Evidence of the intentions of the maker are relevant, and according to the House of Lords case of Hensher v Restawile [1976] AC 64, it is "relevant and important, although not a paramount or leading consideration" if the creator had the conscious purpose of creating a work of art. It is not necessary for the work to be describable as "fine art". In that case, some examples were given of typical articles that might be considered works of artistic craftsmanship, including hand-painted tiles, stained glass, wrought iron gates, and the products of high-class printing, bookbinding, cutlery, needlework and cabinet-making.

Other artworks cited by Copinger that have been held to fall under this definition include hand-knitted woollen sweaters, fabric with a highly textured surface including 3D elements, a range of pottery and items of dinnerware. The cases are, respectively, Bonz v Cooke [1994] 3 NZLR 216 (New Zealand), Coogi Australia v Hyrdrosport (1988) 157 ALR 247 (Australia), Walter Enterprises v Kearns (Zimbabwe) noted at [1990] 4 EntLR E-61, and Commissioner of Taxation v Murray (1990) 92 ALR 671 (Australia).

The Design and Artists Copyright Society and Artquest provide further information on UK freedom of panorama.

=== Copies lacking originality ===
In 2014 (updated 2015) the Intellectual Property Office issued an advice notice, which said, in part:

according to the Court of Justice of the European Union which has effect in UK law, copyright can only subsist in subject matter that is original in the sense that it is the author's own ‘intellectual creation’. Given this criterion, it seems unlikely that what is merely a retouched, digitised image of an older work can be considered as ‘original’. This is because there will generally be minimal scope for a creator to exercise free and creative choices if their aim is simply to make a faithful reproduction of an existing work.

A November 2023 Appeal Court judgement (THJ v. Sheridan, 2023) by Lord Justice Arnold clarified that, in the UK, no new copyright is created in making a photographic reproduction of a two-dimensional public domain artwork, and that this has been the case since 2009.

=== Exceptions protected from contractual override ===
As a result of important changes to UK copyright law in 2014 that were the result of the Hargreaves Review, certain research and public interest exceptions cannot be overridden by contractual terms and conditions. That is to say that irrespective of terms and conditions in contracts that may not allow certain activities, UK copyright law allows people to perform certain acts under copyright law. This became an important issue, as much digital content comes with a licence. It also means that the role of government in passing copyright laws, on behalf of citizens, remains relevant as the activities allowed by statute cannot be disallowed by private contracts. Exceptions that cannot be overridden by contractual terms and conditions include web mining, text mining and data mining, fair dealing for research, the quotation exception, the exceptions for parody, pastiche and caricature as well as exceptions for the disabled and those that relate to libraries such as preservation, and librarians making fair dealing copies of in-copyright works for researchers.

== Evidentiary considerations ==
Evidentiary issues may arise if the person who created a work has only his word to prove that the work is original and is his own work. The author of an unpublished manuscript or little-known publication, that is remarkably similar to a popular novel, will have an uphill battle convincing a court that the popular novel infringes the copyright in his obscure work.

Taking some precautionary steps might help to establish independent creation and authorship.

A common practice to obtain evidence in favour of authorship is to place the copyrighted material in an envelope or package together with a document signed by several people stating that they have examined the work prior to it being sealed and that in their opinion it is original. Once this is done the package is mailed to the owner (or, more usefully, his solicitor) by recorded delivery, which helps to establish when the work was created, who the originator of the work is, and that there are signatory validators prepared to state that it is original.

Once this process is complete the package and contents might be usable in a court of law as evidence of the date of creation (and so priority), if the envelope had been in the custody of a solicitor throughout. However, the process is not a reliable one, and cannot create irrefutable evidence in a legal dispute, because of the simplicity of sealing the envelope at a date later than is recorded, or breaking the seal of the envelope and replacing the contents.

== Legislative history and policy ==
=== Criticisms and proposed changes ===
A 2006 survey carried out for the National Consumer Council indicated that over half of British adults infringe copyright law by copying music CDs, with 59% stating a belief that copying for personal use is legal. In 2006, the Institute for Public Policy Research called for a "private right to copy". In December 2006, the Gowers Review of Intellectual Property was published, and the government began a public consultation period on proposals to legalise personal copying. In January 2008 the government proposed changes to copyright law that would legalise format shifting for personal use under some limited circumstances. The Hargreaves Review of Intellectual Property and Growth, similar to the Gowers Review, was published in May 2011.

=== Changes to Copyright law 2014 ===
On 1 June 2014, three new statutory instruments came into force in the UK, amending the Copyright, Designs and Patents Act 1988. Implementing the Information Society Directive (2001/29/EC). These statutory instruments updated the exceptions and limitations to the rights of performers and copyright around Research, Education, Libraries and Archives; Disability; and Public Administration.

The updated Research, Education, Libraries, and Archives regulation extends the copyright exception for students and libraries from just literary and artistic works to all forms of copyrighted works. Fair dealing still applies. For works that need to be preserved, cultural works can be digitised by libraries, archives, or museums for users to view at dedicated terminals for private study or personal research. Text and data mining will also be permitted for non-commercial research purposes, where the researcher has the right to access the material. The existing exception for fair dealing for instruction purposes is extended to include copying small amounts of material using modern technology, rather than just by hand. The revision also precludes contracts from overriding statutory rights: "(4) To the extent that a term of a contract purports to prevent or restrict the doing of any act which, by virtue of this paragraph, would not infringe any right conferred by this Chapter, that term is unenforceable."

The updated Disability regulation extends an existing exception for visually impaired individuals to create works in an accessible format if none are available, to all individuals with a relevant impairment.

The Public Administration regulation allows public information submitted from third parties to be published online for the first time.

Two additional regulations, announced in March 2014, were delayed for consideration by the Joint Committee on Statutory Instruments. These are around personal copying for private use and quotation and parody and came into force on 1 October 2014. However, the provisions for private copying were quashed by a high court ruling in 2015 on the basis that the harm of private copying to copyright owners was not minimal, thus it was illegal for the government to introduce such regulation without associated compensation for copyright owners.

== See also ==
- Copyright and Related Rights Regulations 2003
- Copyright, Designs and Patents Act 1988
- UK Intellectual Property Office

== Links to legislation ==
=== Original legislation ===
- Text of the Copyright, Designs and Patents Act 1988 as in force today (including any amendments) within the United Kingdom, from legislation.gov.uk.

=== Amending statutory instruments ===
- Design Right (Semiconductor Topographies) (Amendment) Regulations 2006
- Parliamentary Copyright (National Assembly for Wales) Order 2007
- The Artist's Resale Right Regulations 2006
- The Conditional Access (Unauthorised Decoders) Regulations 2000
- The Copyright (Computer Programs) Regulations 1992
- The Copyright (EC Measures Relating to Pirated Goods and Abolition of Restrictions on the Import of Goods) Regulations 1995
- The Copyright and Related Rights Regulations 1996
- The Copyright and Related Rights Regulations 2003
- The Copyright and Rights in Databases (Amendment) Regulations 2003
- The Copyright and Rights in Databases Regulations 1997
- The Design Right (Semiconductor Topographies) Regulations 1989
- The Duration of Copyright and Rights in Performances Regulations 1995
- The Intellectual Property (Enforcement, etc.) Regulations 2006
- The Parliamentary Copyright (Scottish Parliament) Order 1999
- The Performances (Moral Rights, etc.) Regulations 2006
- The Re-use of Public Sector Information Regulations 2005

=== Instruments extending legislation to British possessions ===
- The Copyright (Bermuda) Order 2003

=== Regulations made via statutory instrument under the act ===
- Copyright (Certification of Licensing Scheme for Educational Recording of Broadcasts) (Educational Recording Agency Limited) Order 2007
- The Copyright (Application of Provisions relating to Educational Establishments to Teachers) (No. 2) Order 1989
- The Copyright (Application to the Isle of Man) Order 1992
- The Copyright (Certification of Licensing Scheme for Educational Recording of Broadcasts and Cable Programmes) (Educational Recording Agency Limited) (Revocation) Order 2006
- The Copyright (Certification of Licensing Scheme for Educational Recording of Broadcasts) (Educational Recording Agency Limited) Order 2005
- The Copyright (Certification of Licensing Scheme for Educational Recording of Broadcasts) (Guild Sound and Vision Limited) (Revocation) Order 1990
- The Copyright (Certification of Licensing Scheme for Educational Recording of Broadcasts) (Open University) Order 2003
- The Copyright (Customs) Regulations 1989
- The Copyright (Educational Establishments) Order 2005
- The Copyright (Hong Kong) (Amendment) Order 1990
- The Copyright (Industrial Process and Excluded Articles) (No. 2) Order 1989
- The Copyright (International Organisations) Order 1989
- The Copyright (Librarians and Archivists) (Copying of Copyright Material) Regulations 1989
- The Copyright (Material Open to Public Inspection) (International Organisations) Order 1989
- The Copyright (Material Open to Public Inspection) (Marking of Copies of Maps) Order 1989
- The Copyright (Material Open to Public Inspection) (Marking of Copies of Plans and Drawings) Order 1990
- The Copyright (Recording for Archives of Designated Class of Broadcasts and Cable Programmes) (Designated Bodies) Order 1993
- The Copyright (Recordings of Folksongs for Archives) (Designated Bodies) Order 1989
- The Copyright (Status of Former Dependent Territories) Order 1990
- The Copyright (Sub-titling of Broadcasts and Cable Programmes) (Designated Body) Order 1989
- The Copyright and Performances (Application to Other Countries) Order 2007
- The Copyright and Rights in Performances (Notice of Seizure) Order 1989
- The Copyright Tribunal (Amendment) Rules 1991
- The Copyright Tribunal (Amendment) Rules 1992
- The Copyright Tribunal Rules 1989
- The Fraudulent Reception of Transmissions (Guernsey) Order 1989
- The Goods Infringing Intellectual Property Rights (Customs) Regulations 2004

=== Amending acts ===
- Broadcasting Act 1990 c. 42
- Broadcasting Act 1996 c. 55
- Charities Act 1993 c. 10
- Copyright (Visually Impaired Persons) Act 2002 c. 33
- Copyright, etc. and Trade Marks (Offences and Enforcement) Act 2002 c. 25
- Courts and Legal Services Act 1990 c. 41
- Criminal Justice and Public Order Act 1994 c. 33
- Judicial Pensions and Retirement Act 1993 c. 8
- Legal Deposit Libraries Act 2003 c. 28
- National Health Service and Community Care Act 1990 c. 19
- Trade Marks Act 1994 c. 26

=== Commencement orders ===
- Legal Deposit Libraries Act 2003 (Commencement) Order 2004
- The Copyright (Visually Impaired Persons) Act 2002 (Commencement) Order 2003
- The Copyright, Designs and Patents Act 1988 (Commencement No. 1) Order 1989
- The Copyright, Designs and Patents Act 1988 (Commencement No. 2) Order 1989
- The Copyright, Designs and Patents Act 1988 (Commencement No. 3) Order 1989
- The Copyright, Designs and Patents Act 1988 (Commencement No. 4) Order 1989
- The Copyright, Designs and Patents Act 1988 (Commencement No. 5) Order 1990
- The Copyright, etc. and Trade Marks (Offences and Enforcement) Act 2002 (Commencement) Order 2002

=== Superseded legislation ===
- Copyright Act 1842
- Copyright Act 1911: Copyright in England. Act 1 and 2 Geo. 5 Ch. 46. An act to amend and consolidate the law relating to copyright, passed 16 December 1911
- "Copyright Act 1956" (PDF). opsi.gov.uk.
- Statute of Anne, 1710
