= Copyright and Information Society Directive 2001 =

2001 European Union Directive on Copyright

Directive 2001/29/EC
- European Union directive
- Title: Directive on the harmonisation of certain aspects of copyright and related rights in the information society
- Made by: European Parliament & Council
- Made under: Arts. 42, 55 & 95
- Journal reference: L167, 2001-06-22, p. 10; L6, 2002-01-10, p. 70

History
- Date made: 2001-05-22; updated: 2019-03-28
- Entry into force: 2001-06-22
- Implementation date: 2002-12-22

Preparative texts
- Commission proposal: C108, 1998-04-07, p. 6 C180, 1999-06-25, p. 6
- EESC opinion: C407, 1998-12-28, p. 30
- EP opinion: C150, 1999-05-28, p. 171

Other legislation
- Amends: 92/100/EEC, 93/98/EEC
- Amended by: Directive on Copyright in the Digital Single Market

The Copyright and Information Society Directive 2001 (2001/29) is a directive in European Union law which was enacted to implement the WIPO Copyright Treaty and to harmonise aspects of copyright law across Europe, such as copyright exceptions. The directive was first enacted in 2001 under the internal market provisions of the Treaty of Rome.

The draft directive was subject to unprecedented lobbying and was considered a success for Europe's rightsholders. The 2001 directive gave EU Member States significant freedom in certain aspects of transposition. Member States had until 22 December 2002 to transpose the directive into their national laws. Only Greece and Denmark met the deadline.

== Provisions ==
=== Rights ===
Articles 2–4 contain definitions of the exclusive rights granted to under copyright and related rights. They distinguish the "reproduction right" (Article 2) from the right of "communication to the public" or "making available to the public" (Article 3): the latter is specifically intended to cover publication and transmission on the internet. The two names for the right derive from the WIPO Copyright Treaty and the WIPO Performances and Phonograms Treaty (Arts. 8 & 10 respectively). The related right for authors to authorise or prohibit any form of distribution to the public by sale or otherwise is provided for in Article 4 (exhaustion rights).

=== Exceptions and limitations ===
Article 5 lists the copyright exceptions which Member States may apply to copyright and related rights. The restrictive nature of the list was one source of controversy over the directive: in principle, Member States may only apply exceptions which are on the agreed list, although other exceptions which were already in national laws on 2001-06-22 may remain in force [Article 5(3)(o)]. The Copyright Directive makes only one exception obligatory: transient or incidental copying as part of a network transmission or legal use. Hence internet service providers are not liable for the data they transmit, even if it infringes copyright. The other limitations are optional, with Member States choosing which they give effect to in national laws.

Article 5(2) allows Member States to establish copyright exceptions to the Article 2 reproduction right in cases of:

- photographic reproductions on paper or any similar medium of works (excluding sheet music) provided that the rightholders receives fair compensation,
- reproductions on any medium made by a natural person for private use which is non-commercial provided that the rightholders receives fair compensation,
- reproduction made by libraries, educational establishments, museums or archives, which are non-commercial
- archival reproductions of broadcasts,
- reproductions of broadcasts made by "social institutions pursuing non-commercial purposes, such as hospitals or prisons" provided that the rightholders receives fair compensation.

Article 5(3) allows Member States to establish copyright exceptions to the Article 2 reproduction right and the Article 3 right of communication to the public in cases of:

- illustration for teaching or scientific research, provided the source, including the author's name, is acknowledged,
- uses for the benefit of people with a disability,
- current event reporting, provided the source, including the author's name, is acknowledged,
- quotations for purposes such as criticism or review, provided the source, including the author's name, is acknowledged,
- use necessary for the purposes of "public security" or to the proper performance or reporting of "administrative, parliamentary or judicial proceedings",
- use of political speeches and extracts of public lectures or similar works, provided the source, including the author's name, is acknowledged,
- use during religious celebrations or official celebrations "organised by a public authority",
- use of works such as architecture or sculpture located permanently in public places,
- incidental inclusion of a work in other material,
- the advertising the public exhibition or sale of artistic works
- caricature, parody or pastiche,
- for demonstration or repair of equipment,
- use of an artistic work, drawing or plan of a building for the purposes of reconstruction,
- for non-commercial research or private study

According to Article 5(5) copyright exceptions may only be "applied in certain special cases which do not conflict with a normal exploitation of the work or other subject-matter and do not unreasonably prejudice the legitimate interests of the rightholder", therefore the directive confirms the Berne three-step test.

=== Technological protection measures ===
Article 6 of the Copyright Directive requires that Member States must provide "adequate legal protection" against the intentional circumvention of "effective technological measures" designed to prevent or restrict acts of copying not authorised by the rightholders of any copyright, related right or the sui generis right in databases (preamble paragraph 47). Member States must also provide "adequate legal protection" against the manufacture, import, distribution, sale, rental, advertisement, or possession "for commercial purposes of devices, products or components or the provision of services which":

- are promoted, advertised or marketed for the purpose of circumvention of, or
- have only a limited commercially significant purpose or use other than to circumvent, or
- are primarily designed, produced, adapted or performed for the purpose of enabling or facilitating the circumvention of, any effective technological measures.

In the absence of rightsholders taking voluntary measures the Directive provides that Member States must ensure that technological measures do not prevent uses permitted under Article 5 on copyright exceptions, see Article 6(4). Article 7 requires that Member States must provide "adequate legal protection" against the removal of rights management information metadata.

Unlike Section 1201 of the Digital Millennium Copyright Act, which only prohibits circumvention of access control measures, the Copyright Directive also prohibits circumvention of copy protection measures, making it potentially more restrictive. In both the DMCA and the Copyright Directive, production, distribution etc. of equipment used to circumvent both access and copy-protection is prohibited. Under the DMCA, potential users who want to avail themselves of an alleged fair use privilege to crack copy protection (which is not prohibited) would have to do it themselves since no equipment would lawfully be marketed for that purpose. Under the Copyright Directive, this possibility would not be available since circumvention of copy protection is illegal.

== Implementation by member states ==
Member States were allowed until 22 December 2002 to transpose the directive into their national laws. Only Greece and Denmark met the deadline, although Italy, Austria, Germany and the UK implemented the directive in 2003. The remaining eight Member States (Belgium, Spain, France, Luxembourg, The Netherlands, Portugal, Finland and Sweden) were referred to the European Court of Justice for non-implementation. In 2004 Finland, the UK (with regard to Gibraltar), Belgium and Sweden were held responsible for non-implementation.

National implementation measures include:

- Czech Republic: the amendment No. 216/2006 Coll. of the Czech Copyright Act
- Finland: 2005 amendment to the Finnish Copyright Act and Penal Code
- France: loi n^{o} 2006-961 du 1^{er} août 2006 relative au droit d'auteur et aux droits voisins dans la société de l'information, better known as "DADVSI"
- United Kingdom: Copyright and Related Rights Regulations 2003

== Reviews and revision ==
=== Legal acts of private copying ===
The Commission initiated a review of the application of the directive in 2004 as part of a review of copyright legislation. This included the aspect of the rules which allowed for legal acts of private copying to be sanctioned as long as rights-holders were offered fair compensation.

=== 2019 revision and expansion ===
In 2016, leaked documents revealed that two new provisions were under consideration. The first, aimed at social media companies, sought to make automated screening for copyrighted content mandatory for all cases in which a user can upload data. The second proposed that news publishers should benefit financially when links to their articles are posted on a commercial platform. Responding to criticism, Axel Voss admitted that the law was "maybe not the best idea", but went on to support its passage and draft some of the language being used to amend Article 11.

The update has been widely derided as a link tax. Its critics include German former MEP Felix Reda, Internet company Mozilla and copyright reform activists associated with the Creative Commons. Some discussion has concerned the inability for news agencies to opt out of the payment system and the claim that ancillary rights for news snippets contradicts the Berne convention.

== See also ==
- Copyright law of the European Union
- Digital Millennium Copyright Act
- Deckmyn v Vandersteen (case law regarding the Parody exception)
