= Ancillary copyright for press publishers =

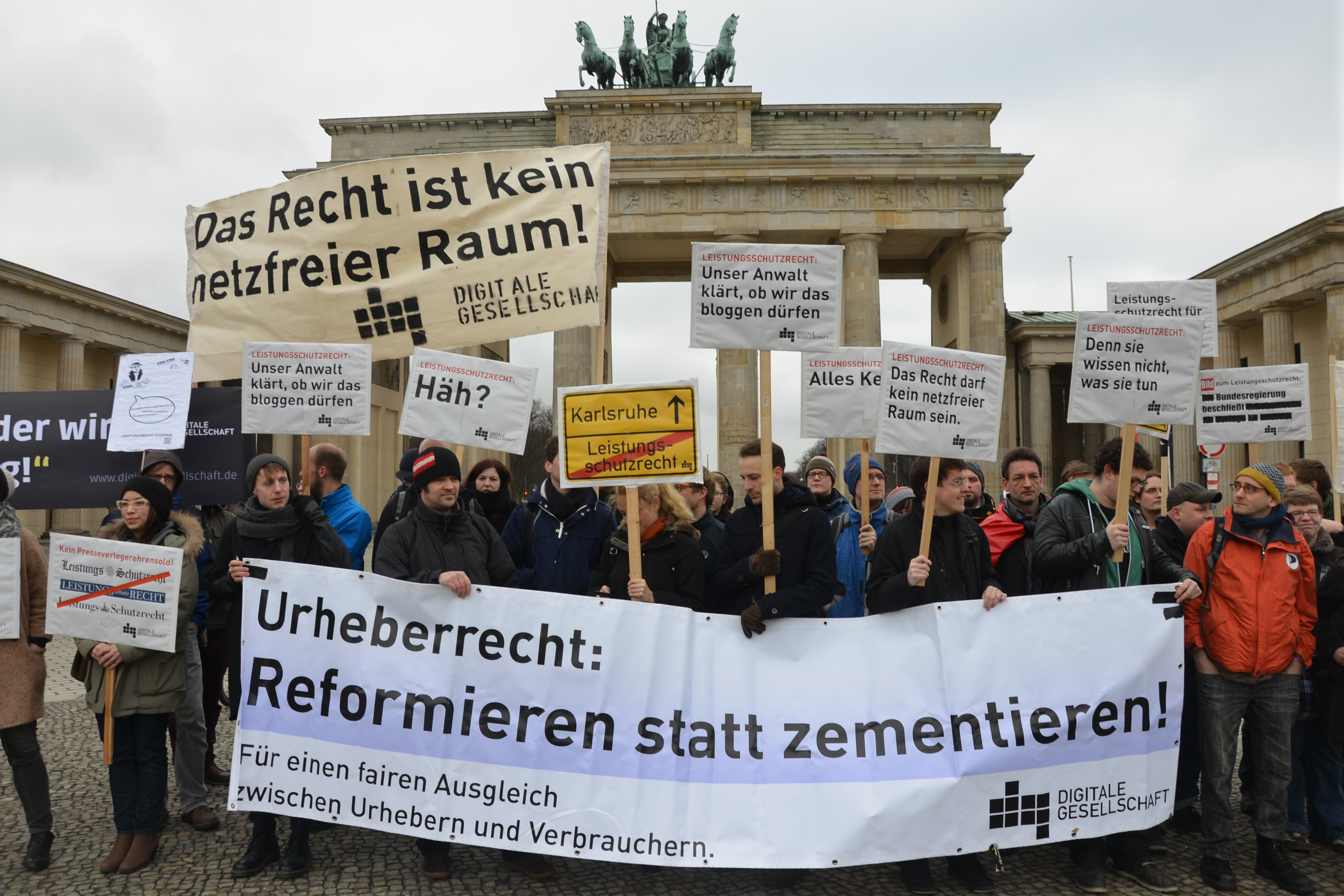
Protest against Ancillary copyright in Berlin, organized by Digitale Gesellschaft

The ancillary copyright for press publishers (German: Leistungsschutzrecht für Presseverleger) is a proposal incorporated in 2012 legislation proposed by the ruling coalition of the German government, led by Angela Merkel of the Christian Democratic Union (CDU), to extend publishers' copyrights. The bill was agreed by the Cabinet at the end of August 2012 and submitted to parliament on 14 November 2012. It was passed by the Bundestag on 1 March 2013 by 293 to 243, following substantial changes in the week before the vote.

In its original form, the law would have forced Internet content providers to pay fees, collected by a central clearinghouse, to publishers for displaying their content: fees would have been levied for even short snippets of news made available by news aggregators and web search engines. The intended effect would have been to force Google, a leading search engine, to pay publishers fees for display of news search results, causing the bill to be dubbed a "Google tax" by some. It would give press agencies the exclusive right to publish press releases for commercial purposes on the Internet and would require search engines such as Google to obtain licenses for using small text passages. A Google spokesman called it "a black day for the Internet in Germany". Many trade associations regard it as useless and critics fear a reduction in diversity of opinion. Wikimedia Deutschland regards this as dangerous "for the creators of free content in general and for providers of open content platforms in particular". It was agreed between the coalition parties, the CDU and the FDP in their coalition agreement for the 17th session of the German Bundestag.

It passed in the Bundesrat March 22, 2013, was published in the Bundesgesetzblatt May 14, and came into force on August 1, 2013.

The publisher's right is the subject of an ongoing legal challenge by Google and has not yet generated significant revenue for German publishing groups.

== History ==
German copyright law already provides for similar "related rights" in relation to other protected objects. They are regulated in sections 70 et seq. of the German Copyright Act (Urheberrechtsgesetz). A press release from the German Federal Association of Newspaper Publishers (Bundesverband Deutscher Zeitungsverleger, BDZV) dated 7 May 2009 justified the demand for such a "related right" for press publishers on the grounds that press enterprises needed to defend themselves against unpaid use of their products on the Internet. This demand found its expression in the coalition agreement, which, in line 4776, states:

Publishers should not be placed in a worse position in the online field than other disseminators of a work. We therefore propose to create a related right for press publishers to improve the protection of press products on the Internet.

In a speech to the Newspaper Congress of the German Federal Association of Newspaper Publishers in September 2011, the chancellor, Angela Merkel, stated that legislation on such related rights was in preparation:

Publishing costs time and money. For this reason, I can understand the demand for related rights for publishers. The Federal Government is therefore currently working on a bill to adapt German copyright law even more to the requirements of a modern information society. We have not forgotten it; it is being pushed forward. We are striving for a balanced solution that takes account of the just interests of all those involved.

Merkel also announced that she would push the idea at the European level.

On 5 March 2012, the joint coalition committee agreed to introduce "related rights" for press publishers as part of the third basket of the reform of the German Copyright Act. Within a year, the commercial use of press products on the Internet, particularly for search engine providers and news aggregators, was to be subject to a charge. There was to be the equivalent of a performing rights society for collection and distribution of the fees. One thing that remains unclear is where the line should be drawn between chargeable commercial use and private use, which was to remain free.

On 14 June 2012, it became known that the German Federal Ministry of Justice had sent a draft of a bill to other ministries and lobby groups. This draft, which would insert new sub-sections 87f to 87h into the German Copyright Act is currently available on the Internet.

On 25 August 2016, Statewatch published a draft of the European Commission's impact assessment on the modernisation of EU copyright rules. This draft states that the Commission will indeed propose the introduction of an EU wide ancillary copyright for news publishers, contradicting reassurances from Andrus Ansip that no link tax would be introduced.

== Impact ==
Immediately after the publisher's right entered into law in August 2013, German media publishers created VG Media, a copyright collective which negotiates on their behalf. Google and other large internet companies refused to negotiate with the group, claiming that they did not need to pay and that the license fee demanded, of 11%, was unfair. At the same time numerous German publishers entered a zero-cost licensing agreement with Google so that their content continued to be displayed on Google News. VG Media reduced its fee to 6% in October 2014.

The German Patent and Trademark office found in September 2015 that the fee did apply. VG Media filed a competition complaint against Google, which it accuses of illegally misusing its dominant market position. The complaint was dismissed. VG Media then filed a civil suit claiming that Google owed them remuneration.

In 2019 the European Court of Justice ruled that this German law was invalid, because it had been submitted in advance to the EU Commission, as required.

== Issues ==
=== Free speech ===
Opponents of the measure believe that granting copyright protection to what may be little more than headlines violates the freedom of speech. Till Kreutzer of the Bureau for Information Law Expertise wrote in 2011 that this expansion of copyright, sought by publishers since 2009, could cause "collateral damage to fundamental freedoms like the freedom of the press, the freedom of expression, the freedom of science and education as well as the communication and publication practices on the Web."

Supporters have stated that freedom of speech would be protected because "journalistic citations from news articles" would be exempt from the bill, as would private Internet users. Publishers perceive the fees as fair compensation for the effort put into reporting; in an example presented at a hearing on the bill, "a bank employee reads his morning newspaper online and sees something about the steel industry, and then advises his clients to invest in certain markets ... The publishers argued that the bank consultant was only able to advise his clients because of the journalistic work in the published article. So that means the publisher deserves a fair share of any money made"

=== Consistency with other copyright law ===
According to Till Kreuzer, writing in Computer Law & Security Review and cited by a group opposing the bill, Initiative Gegen ein Leistungsschutzrecht, the 2009 German coalition government announced in its coalition contract that "Press Publishers shall not be discriminated against other disseminators of copyright protected works [e.g. film or music producers]. Therefore we aim for the introduction of a neighbouring right for press publishers to increase the protection of press publications on the Internet." However, Kreuzer disputed that the proposed right is comparable to neighboring rights for other forms of copyrighted media, writing that the regulation of extraction of snippets from news sources and regulation of the right to read ("reception") of the sites containing media were unprecedented in the law.

=== Disbursements ===
The co-founder of Perlentaucher questioned what criteria would be used to determine eligibility to receive payments from the clearinghouse, noting that if every blog were eligible, benefits to newspapers would be very small. These criteria remain under consideration by drafters of the proposal.

=== Author's right ===
German authors of news articles retain author's right to control news articles after their publication, raising the question of how payments would be divided between publishers and authors.

=== Economic considerations ===
The Federation of German Newspaper Publishers issued a statement that "In the digital age, such a right is essential to protect the joint efforts of journalists and publishers," describing such revenues as "an essential measure for the maintenance of an independent, privately financed news media."

A spokesman of Google denounced the proposal: "We don't have any sympathy for these plans, as an ancillary copyright lacks all factual, economic, and legal foundation. And we are not alone with this opinion: The Federation of German Industries (BDI) and 28 other associations vehemently oppose an ancillary copyright for publishers. The German parliament is divided on the issue as well. For a good reason: An ancillary copyright would mean a massive damage to the German economy. It's a threat to the freedom of information. And it would leave Germany behind internationally as a place for business." Critics have suggested that Google might respond to the law by ceasing to do business in Germany.

== Comparisons with other countries ==
The New York Times quoted Christoph Keese, described as "co-chairman of a copyright committee of German publishers" and president of public affairs for Axel Springer, "There is no other developed country that has given publishers this kind of right against aggregators. This could be a benchmark." The New York Times compared the measure to NewsRight, a system introduced by The New York Times and other newspapers, that tracks unpaid use of articles, while noting that the NewsRight system does not address the use of snippets.

== See also ==
- Copyright law of Germany
- Copyright law of Australia
- Google tax
- Online News Act (Canada)
