= Mar Cabra =

Spanish investigative journalist (born 1983)

María del Mar Cabra Valero
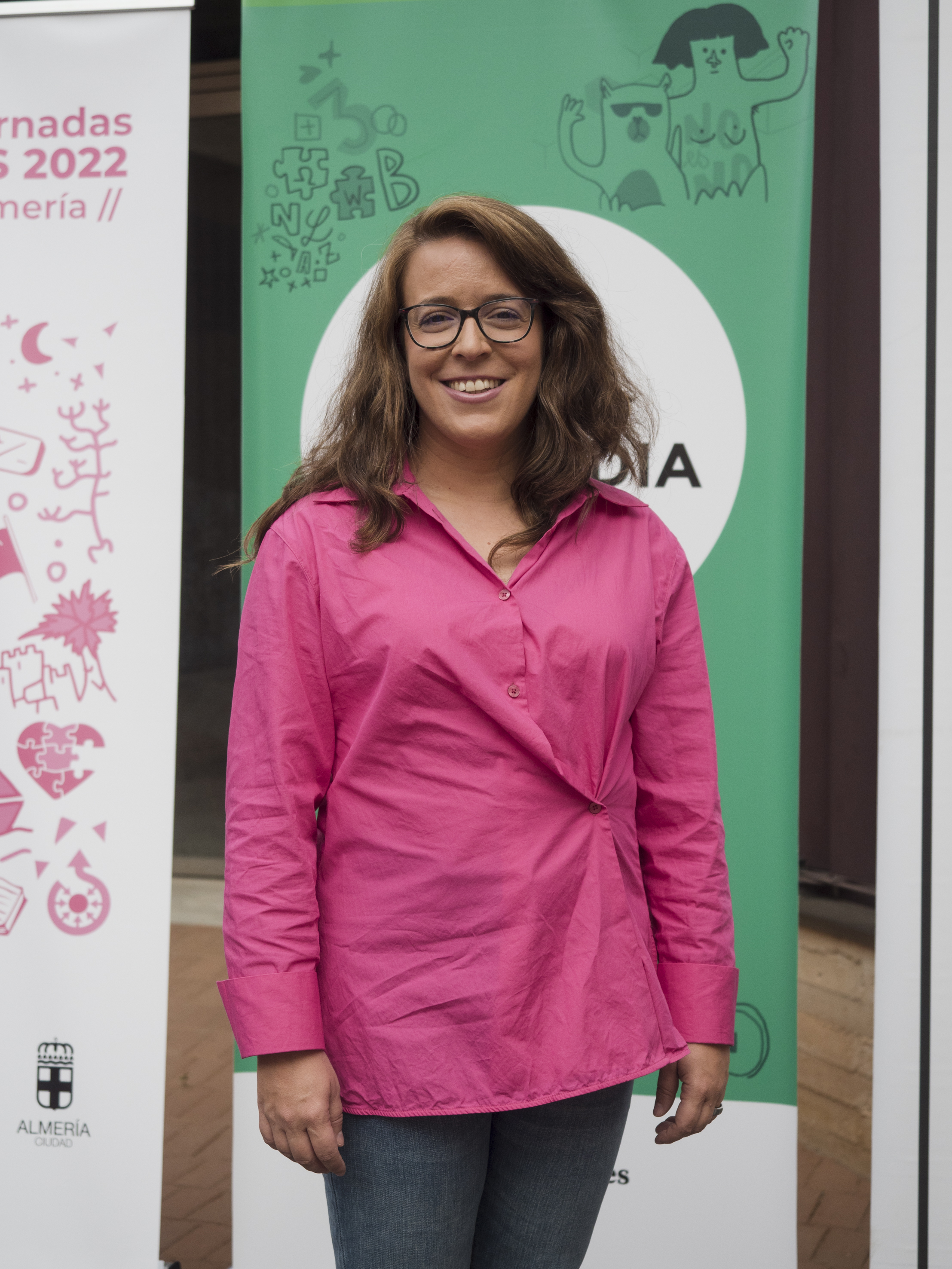
- Mar Cabra in 2022
- Born: June 14, 1983 (age 43); Madrid, Spain
- Citizenship: Spain
- Education: Complutense University of Madrid (Bachelors); Columbia University Graduate School of Journalism (Masters)
- Occupation: Journalist
- Employer(s): BBC; CNN+ La Sexta; El Mundo
- Organization: International Consortium of Investigative Journalists
- Known for: Investigation on Panama Papers
- Notable work: Luxembourg Leaks; Swiss Leaks; Paradise Papers; Panama Papers; Bahamas Leaks
- Awards: Pulitzer Prize (2017)

María del Mar Cabra Valero (born 14 June 1983) is a Spanish investigative journalist and a data analysis specialist who is known for her investigation on Panama Papers for which she received Pulitzer Prize in 2017.

== Career ==
Cabra completed her bachelor's degree in audiovisual communication from the Complutense University of Madrid. Since 2004, she had been a researcher and a local journalist working for BBC and from 2005, she began working as editor, video journalist and video producer for CNN+, LaSexta and El Mundo.

She then completed master's degree in investigative journalism from the Stabile Center at Columbia University Graduate School of Journalism, New York City in between 2009 and 2010 during which she also had received Fulbright scholarship. For co-producing a research segment for the PBS documentary, Need to Know, she received the DuPont-Crichton award for the best documentary. Also during her U.S. stay, she had worked as a researcher for Miami Herald and Huffington Post.

In 2011–2017, Cabra headed the data and research unit of International Consortium of Investigative Journalists (ICIJ). Beginning her work on Panama papers in 2015, she led a 2-year investigation which in its aftermath resulted in many world leaders to resign including a minister from Spain, José Manuel Soria in 2016. Due to sensory overload and fatigue caused by social media, she resigned as a head in ICIJ but remained as its member.

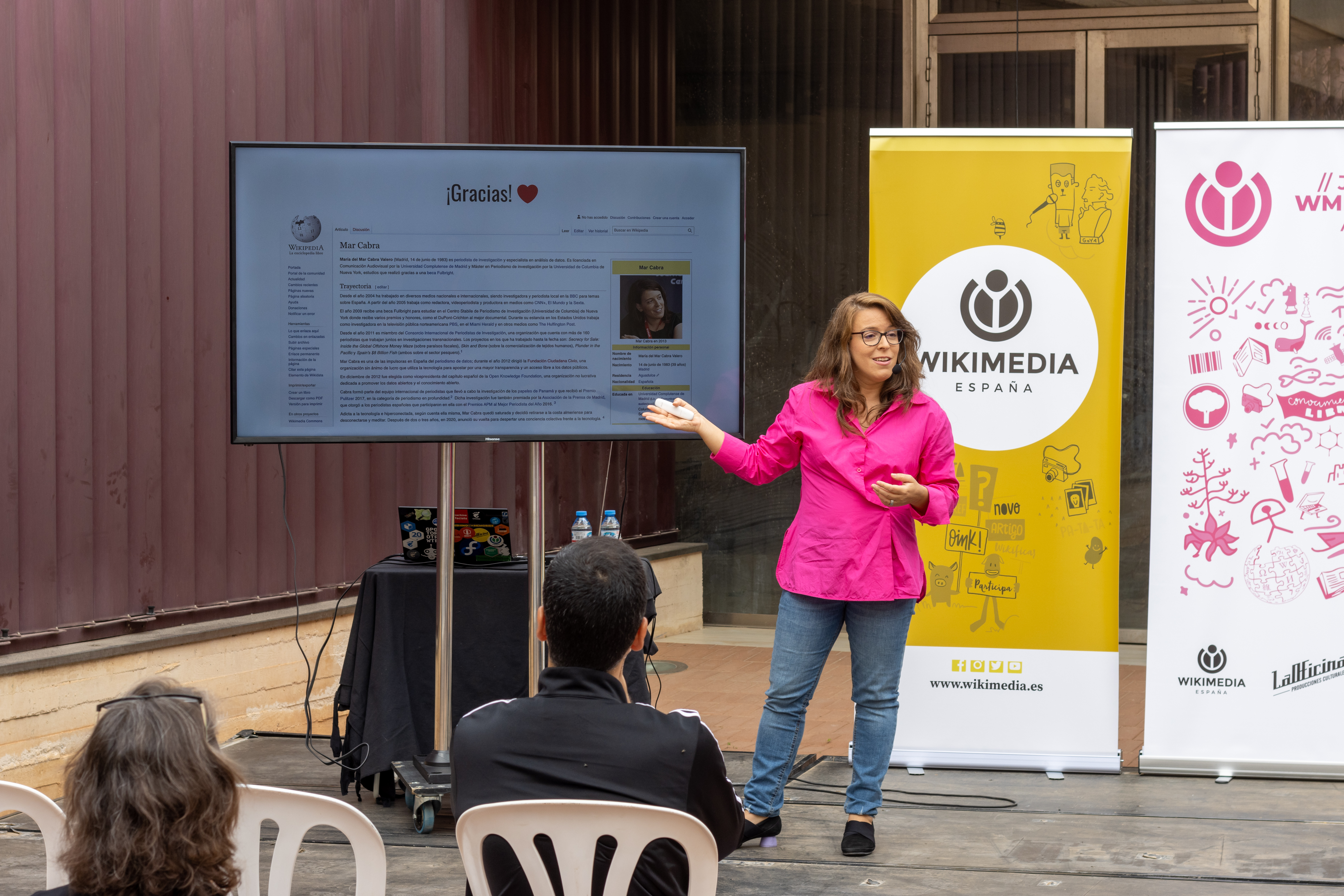
Mar Cabra at Wikimedia Spain conference, 2022

For her work on Panama papers, she was conferred with APM Journalist of the Year award by Madrid Press Association in 2017. In the same year, for applying big data in journalism she had received the Best Data Journalist of the Year award by the Almeria press association.

In December 2012, Cabra was elected vice president of the Spain chapter of Open Knowledge Foundation, a non–profit organization working to promote free and reusable access to knowledge.

In 2020, Cabra co-founded The Self-Investigation, a non–profit organization that works for promoting mental health of journalists by helping them to work in a healthy environment.

== Investigative works in ICIJ ==
Mar Cabra at ICIJ, 2016

Apart from Panama Papers, Cabra had worked as either data editor or reporter in these ICIJ projects:

- Looting the Seas I–investigation on Bluefin black market in Japan (2012)
- Looting the Seas II–investigation on fishing sector in Spain (2011)
- Skin and Bone–investigation on dark trade of human body parts (2012)
- Luxembourg Leaks–investigation on Luxembourg as a tax haven (2014)
- Fatal Extraction–investigation on Australian mining companies across Africa (2015)
- Swiss Leaks–investigation on Swiss branch of HSBC bank (2015)
- Secrecy for Sale–investigation on named individuals in offshore companies in Bahamas (2016)
- Paradise Papers–global investigation on offshore activities of top leaders and politicians (2017)

== Awards and recognitions ==
- APM Young Journalist of the Year award (2012)
- Pulitzer Prize for Explanatory Reporting (2017)
- Best Data Journalist of the Year award (2017)
- APM Journalist of the Year award (2017)
