= Directive on Copyright in the Digital Single Market =

2019 EU copyright reform directive

Directive 2019/790
- European Union directive
- Text with EEA relevance
- Title: Directive (EU) 2019/790 of the European Parliament and of the Council of 17 April 2019 on copyright and related rights in the Digital Single Market and amending Directives 96/9/EC and 2001/29/EC
- Made under: Articles 53(1), 62 and 114
- Journal reference: L 130, 17 May 2019

History
- European Parliament vote: 348 / 622
- Date made: 17 April 2019
- Entry into force: 6 June 2019
- Implementation date: 7 June 2021

Other legislation
- Amends: Database Directive (Directive 96/9/EC); Information Society Directive (Directive 2001/29/EC)

The Directive on Copyright in the Digital Single Market, formally the Directive (EU) 2019/790 of the European Parliament and of the Council of 17 April 2019 on copyright and related rights in the Digital Single Market and amending Directives 96/9/EC and 2001/29/EC, is a European Union (EU) directive which has been adopted and came into force on 6 June 2019. It is intended to ensure "a well-functioning marketplace for copyright". It extends existing European Union copyright law and is a component of the EU's Digital Single Market project. The Council of the European Union describes their key goals with the Directive as protecting press publications; reducing the "value gap" between the profits made by Internet platforms and by content creators; encouraging collaboration between these two groups, and creating copyright exceptions for text- and data-mining.

The directive was introduced in the European Parliament Committee on Legal Affairs on 20 June 2018, and a revised proposal was approved by the parliament on 12 September 2018. The final version, which resulted from negotiations during formal trilogue meetings, was presented to the parliament on 13 February 2019. It was approved by the European Parliament on 26 March 2019 and by the Council of the European Union on 15 April 2019. Member states had two years to pass appropriate legislation to meet the Directive's requirements.

The directive has generally been opposed by major tech companies and a vocal number of Internet users, as well as human rights advocates, but supported by media groups and conglomerates, including newspapers and publishers. Two of the Directive's articles have drawn significant discussion. Draft Article 11 (Article 15 of the directive), known as the "link tax", gives newspapers more direct control and re-use of their work, which may impact some Internet services like news aggregators. Draft Article 13 (Article 17 of the directive) tasks service providers that host user-generated content to employ "effective and proportionate" measures to prevent users from violating copyright. Tech companies expressed concern that this would necessitate the need for upload filters. A broad concern with the Directive is on the use of fair dealing through the directive, and that it could quell freedom of speech.

== Provisions ==
Article numbers refer to the draft version of this copyright directive up through around 20 March 2019; the approved directive reorders several of the articles, such as draft Article 13 becoming the Directive's Article 17.

=== Article 3 and 4 ===
Article 3 introduces a copyright exception for text and data mining (TDM) for the purposes of scientific research and article 4 for any TDM. The original COREPER version had both a mandatory and an optional extension.

These exceptions predate the rise of generative AI and the copyright questions associated with it. But the fact that the EU's 2024 AI Act explicitly refers to the commercial TDM exception in article 4 "is widely seen as a clear indication of the EU legislator’s intention that the exception covers AI data collection", a view that was also endorsed in a 2024 German court decision. Unlike the TDM exception for scientific research in article 3, the more general exception in article 4 only applies if the copyright holder has not opted out.

Depending on whether it acknowledges the public domain status of facts and information, the TDM exception could increase or decrease restrictions compared to the status quo.

=== Article 5 ===
Article 5 introduces a mandatory exception for the use of copyrighted works as part of "digital and cross-border teaching activities". This article clarifies that educational establishments can make non-commercial use of copyrighted works for illustrative purposes.

There have been worries from the educational sector that the exception proposed in article 5 is too limiting. For example, the sector proposes to broaden the scope of "educational establishments" to include cultural heritage institutions. The most debated part of the article is 5(2), under which the exception would not be available if there are "adequate licenses" available in the market.

=== Article 14 ===
Article 14 has inspired and helped publish works like Postcards from Italian museums by Simone Aliprandi, here with its Vitruvian Man page.

Article 14 states that reproductions of works of visual art that are in the public domain cannot be subject to copyright or related rights, unless the reproduction is an original creative work.

=== Draft Article 11 (Article 15 of the directive) ===
Draft Article 11 (Article 15 of the directive) extends the 2001 Information Society Directive to grant publishers direct copyright over "online use of their press publications by information society service providers". Under current EU law, publishers instead rely on authors assigning copyright to them and must prove rights ownership for each individual work. The version of the directive voted on by the European Parliament Committee on Legal Affairs contained explicit exemptions for the act of hyperlinking and "legitimate private and non-commercial use of press publications by individual users".

The proposal attaches several new conditions to the right, including expiry after two years and exemptions for either copying an "insubstantial" part of a work or for copying it in the course of academic or scientific research. It is derived from the ancillary copyright for press publishers which was introduced in Germany in 2013. Press publishing, "whose purpose is to inform the general public and which are periodically or regularly updated", is distinguished from academic and scientific publishing (Recital 33).

Article 11 was moved to Article 15 in the final draft from the trilogue negotiations issued 26 March 2019 and approved by the Parliament and Council.

=== Draft Article 13 (Directive Article 17) ===
Draft Article 13 of the draft replaces the "mere conduit" exemption from copyright infringement from for-profit "online content sharing service providers" with a new, conditional exemption to liability. These conditions are an implementation of "effective and proportionate measures", as claimed by service providers, to "prevent the availability of specific [unlicensed] works identified by rightsholders", acting "expeditiously" to remove them, and demonstrating that "best efforts" have been made to prevent their future availability. The article also extends any licenses granted to content hosts to their users, as long as those users are not acting "on a commercial basis".

The article directs member states to consider the size of the provider, the amount of content uploaded, and the effectiveness of the measures imposed "in light of technological developments". It also mandates an appeals process, and requires content hosts to share "information on the use of content" with the content's owner, the lack of which has been a point of contention in the past.

Draft Article 13's provisions target commercial web hosts which "store and give the public access to a large number of works or other subject-matter uploaded by its users which [they] organise and promote for profit-making purposes". The proposal makes explicit that this does not include private cloud storage services, non-profit encyclopedias (such as Wikipedia), nor non-profit educational or scientific repositories.

Draft Article 13b requires websites which "automatically reproduce or refer to significant amounts of copyright-protected visual works" to "conclude fair and balanced licensing agreements with any requesting rightholders [sic]".

Draft Article 13 was named Article 17 in the final trilogue draft issued in February 2019 and approved by the European Parliament and Council.

=== Draft Articles 14 through 16 (Directive articles 18 through 20) ===
As a whole, draft articles 14-16 (Directive Articles 18–20) in the working version of the Directive, improve the bargaining position of authors and performers, even though it set out systems that were weaker than some existing ones in member states. Draft article 15 (Directive article 19) aims to allow authors to increase their remuneration in some cases where it is disproportionately low.

Associations of authors had proposed a "rights reversion mechanism" which would allow cancelling a copyright transfer agreement proven to be disadvantageous.

=== Other articles ===
Other passages of the proposal attempt to clarify the legal status of orphan works and certain common activities by libraries.

Prior to the Trilogue negotiations, Article 12a proposed granting sports event organisers copyright over recordings of their events. The March 2019 version only says, on the last page, that the commission in the future will assess the challenges of illegal online transmissions of sports broadcasts.

== History ==
=== Background ===
The European Union's (EU) first attempt to unify copyrights in light of digital technologies was adopted in 2001 as the Information Society Directive 2001/29/EC. The Directive's major objectives were to harmonise EU legislation with international law (as set by the 1996 World Intellectual Property Organization treaties), to strengthen intellectual property protection, to reduce conflicts in copyright laws between member states, and to assure adequate remuneration to content producers. While some parts of the 2001 Directive were effective, other parts of the directive were not satisfactory for the current digital market long after its implementation. In 2012, the European Commission (EC) announced that they would be reviewing the 2001 Directive and having stakeholder discussions in light of several issues raised with failed copyright proposals from those in the European Commissioner for Internal Market and Services position. The EC took public comments from December 2013 through March 2014, and published its first report on the state of the EU copyright law in July 2014.

In 2014, Jean-Claude Juncker was elected to the presidency of the European Commission and took office in November 2014. In his campaign position, Juncker saw the potential to "improve" the EU's financial status by harmonising the various digital marketplaces among member nations to create job opportunities and drive a knowledge-based society. Juncker appointed Estonian politician, Andrus Ansip, as vice-president for the Digital Single Market within the EC that year, tasked with working with Günther Oettinger, European Commissioner for Digital Economy and Society, and other sections within the EC to come up with the necessary legislative steps that would be required to implement a Digital Single Market. Initial plans for the legislative steps and their potential impact were announced by the EC in May 2015. Ansip stated that by the implementation of a Digital Single Market, they could increase the European gross domestic product by as much as €415 billion per year. The European Parliament, following up on a report on the state of European Copyright from a member of the European Parliament (MEP), Felix Reda, that identified several inadequacies of the 2001 Information Society Directive, affirmed support for the EC's goal of a Digital Single Market as well as supporting an initiative with the EP for similar copyright reform. The EC subsequently began working on establishing the legal framework by the end of 2015.

=== Legislative process ===
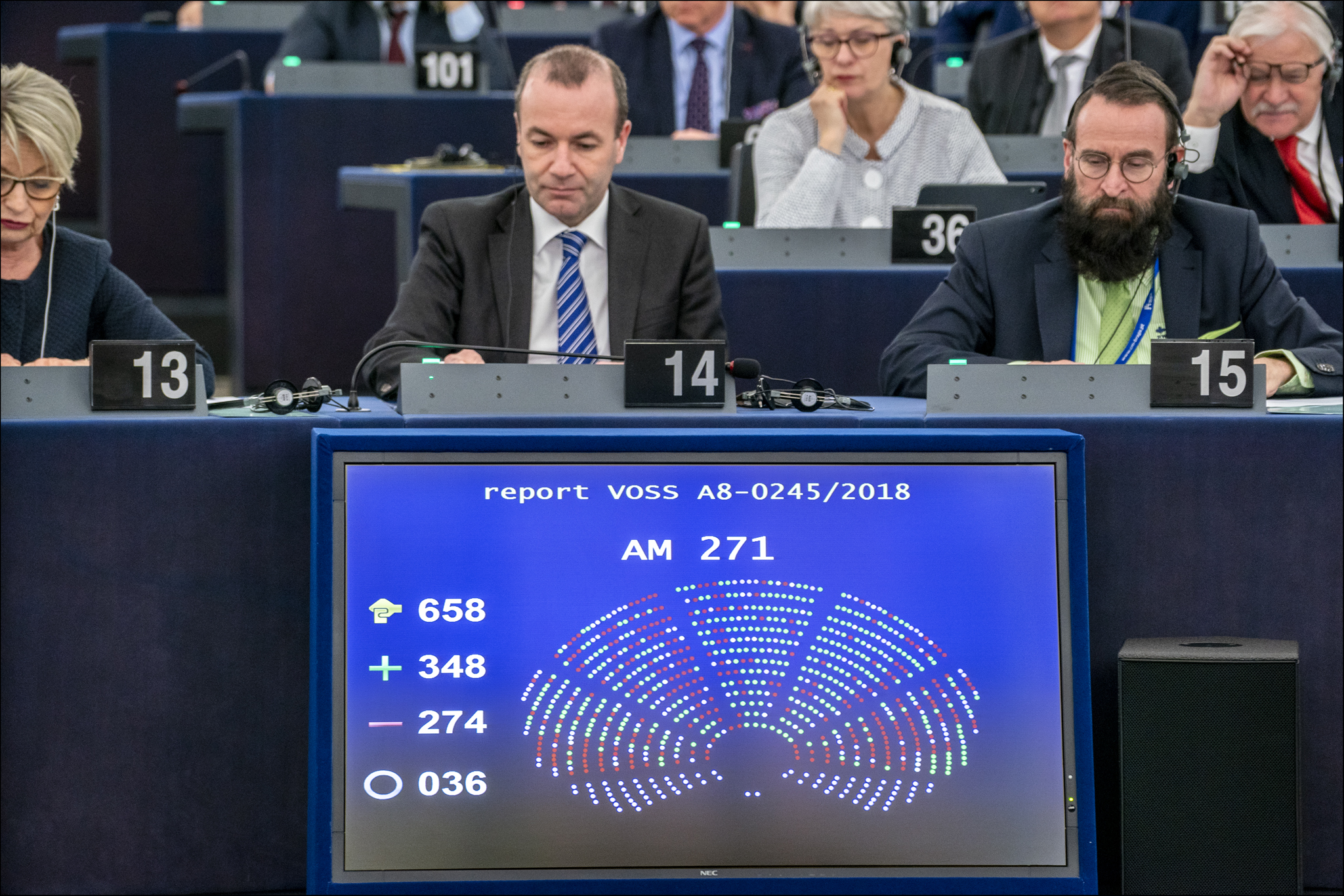
Approval of the measure by the European Parliament in Strasbourg, 26 March 2019

The directive fell within the ordinary legislative procedure, and thus was to be approved by both the European Parliament and the Council of the European Union. While the European Parliament had to pass the Directive with a simple majority, in the council a qualified majority was needed: at least 55% of the countries, representing over 65% of the population.

The first draft of the proposed Directive from the EC was issued on 14 September 2016, Following revisions, the Council of the European Union's Committee of Permanent Representatives (COREPER) approved of the EC's legislative directives on 25 May 2018 and prepared to bring the matter to vote in the EP, to reach a final text, without the support of Germany, Finland, the Netherlands, Slovenia, Belgium, or Hungary. The European Parliament Committee on Legal Affairs finalised their amendments to the directive on 20 June 2018 and put them toward the parliament for negotiation.

Members of the European Parliament voted on 5 July 2018 not to proceed to the negotiation stage, but instead to reopen the directive for debate in September 2018. There were 318 votes to re-open the debate, 278 to proceed, and 31 abstentions.

On 12 September 2018, an updated position of the parliament was approved with the final vote being 438 in favour and 226 against, meaning that trilogue negotiations can start between the European Commission, the Council of the European Union and the European Parliament, with an expected conclusion in early 2019. Should the three groups agree to the final language, then the directive will be sent to governments of the then twenty-eight member states to be passed as laws within those countries, with each country formalising certain processes as necessary to meet their existing laws.

Initial trilogue meetings overseen by Romania were scheduled to start on 21 January 2019, however, on 19 January 2019, Romania cancelled these meetings following the rejection of Romania's proposed compromise text by eleven countries: Germany, Belgium, the Netherlands, Finland, Slovenia, Italy, Poland, Sweden, Croatia, Luxembourg and Portugal. With the exclusion of Portugal and Croatia, the other nine countries rejected the compromised text for Articles 11 and/or 13 stating that the measures did not do enough to do to protect their citizens' copyright protections. Romania had the opportunity to revise their text to gain a majority vote, delaying the vote.

The trilogue negotiations were completed on 13 February 2019, the final text still retaining the controversial Articles 11 and 13. At this point, the text was reviewed by the European Parliament Committee on Legal Affairs, and then presented to the full European Parliament for a vote. The vote in Parliament was held on 26 March 2019, with the Directive passing by a vote of 348 MPs to 274 against. After corrections of mistaken votes, the result was a vote of 338 MPs to 284. The main support for the directive came from the centre-right (EPP). In terms of countries, most votes in favour came from France (62), Italy (39), Germany (38), Spain (34) and the UK (31), while the most votes against it came from Germany (49), Poland (33), UK (30), Italy (27) and the Netherlands (17). While there had been an additional vote on an amendment to have a separate vote on the inclusion of the two controversial Articles (draft Articles 11 and 13, Directive Articles 15 and 17), the amendment narrowly failed to pass, with at least 13 MEPs stating they mistakenly voted the wrong way on this vote; if these had been voted as the MEP had intended, the amendment would have passed and required the additional vote.

Voting results in the European Parliament without corrections on 26 March 2019 by political groups

(In favour/against DSM copyright directive)

Voting in the council on 15 April. Besides voting against, Finland, Italy, Luxembourg, the Netherlands and Poland have released a joint statement opposing the final draft of the directive.

The Directive was approved by the Council of the European Union on 15 April 2019. 19 member states (representing 71% of the EU population in the countries that cast a vote) voted in favour of the Directive with six opposing and three abstaining.

=== Implementation into national law ===
Being an EU directive, the Directive on Copyright in the Digital Single Market can not immediately be applied in jurisdiction but has to be implemented into national law by the parliaments of the EU member states. The EU wide deadline for transposition of the directive into national law by 7 June 2021, was not met by 23 members of the union – the exception being Hungary, Germany and the Netherlands – resulting in opening of infringement procedures against the other 23 members of the union (Article 258 TFEU (ex Article 226 TEC)). This culminated in the Commission referring six members of the Union – these being Bulgaria, Denmark, Finland, Latvia, Poland and Portugal – to the European Court of Justice. Bulgaria, Denmark, Poland and Portugal were ordered in 2025 by the Court to pay lump sums running into the millions. As of October 2026, all member states have transposed the directive, the last being Poland, whose implementing act entered into force on 20 September 2024.

=== Legal challenge of the directive ===
In a separate case, Poland filed an action for annulment of the directive with the Court of Justice of the European Union on 24 May 2019. Deputy Foreign Minister of Poland Konrad Szymański said the directive "may result in adopting regulations that are analogous to preventive censorship, which is forbidden not only in the Polish constitution but also in the EU treaties" on public broadcaster TVP Info. On 26 April 2022, the Court of Justice dismissed Poland's action (Case C-401/19). It held that Article 17 is compatible with the freedom of expression and information, but only because it contains sufficient safeguards: platforms may only use filtering systems that block content whose unlawfulness is manifest without the need for an independent legal assessment, and lawful uses such as quotation, criticism, review, caricature, parody and pastiche must remain possible.

== Positions ==
=== Politicians ===
As of 21 March 2019, 100 MEPs had signed in support of the directive, while 126 had agreed to vote against it. On 20 March 2019 74 MEPs asked for Article 13 to be deleted from the directive. In the end, 348 voted for and 274 voted against.

In 2018, support in the European Parliament was led by the European People's Party group and the Progressive Alliance of Socialists and Democrats, the parliament's two largest groups. Major national parties in support include Germany's ruling Christian Democratic Union and their coalition partners the Social Democratic Party, the United Kingdom's ruling Conservative Party and opposition Labour Party, and Poland's main opposition party, Civic Platform.

The directive's rapporteur, Axel Voss, is German MEP and a member of the EPP. Voss rejects critics' arguments against the directive, and in particular describes talk of censorship as "unjustified, excessive, objectively wrong and dishonest". He points out that content filtering technology has been in use on YouTube for a decade without having ever sparked an "anti-censorship campaign", and accuses "big [internet] platforms" of mounting a "fake news campaign". Axel Voss's understanding of copyright was referred to as "absolutely lacking" in 2019 by Till Kreutzer, a copyright expert, after Voss stated that people are allowed to upload newspaper articles in full. Tom Watson, a member of Parliament of the United Kingdom and the deputy leader of the Labour Party, said, "we have got to secure for the workers [...] the full fruits of their industry. Google are trying to prevent that from happening".

Opposition in the European Parliament is led by populist parties including Poland's ruling Law and Justice party, Italy's ruling Five Star Movement/Lega Nord coalition, and the UK Independence Party. Other opponents include a large number of smaller parties at either end of the political spectrum. Notable among these is the Pirate Party Germany, whose sole MEP Felix Reda has been an outspoken opponent of the proposal. He describes the efforts behind the law as large media companies trying to force "platforms and search engines to use their snippets and to pay for them". UKIP leader and MEP Gerard Batten said that the proposal may "destroy the capacity for free speech on the internet and social media". Batten further noted that an international agreement, and not an EU directive, was needed to protect "the legitimate rights of creators, authors and innovators", whilst not stifling "free speech and information dissemination".

It has been rumoured that during the Council of the European Union's private vote to approve its negotiating position in March 2018 the ambassadors of Germany, Finland, the Netherlands, Slovenia, Belgium and Hungary either abstained from voting or voted against the proposal. However, MEPs of each of those countries' governing parties went on to largely or wholly support the directive in parliament.

German politician Kevin Kühnert, federal chairperson of the Social Democratic Party's youth organisation, has voiced opposition to Article 13, claiming that it violates the coalition agreement between the SPD and the CDU/CSU. Petra Sitte, vice-chair of the democratic socialist party The Left, also stated that the effective endorsement of upload filters violates the coalition agreement, calling this copyright directive a "compromise between the interests of different large corporations" ("Kompromiss zwischen den Interessen verschiedener Großkonzerne") and "a grave threat to freedom of expression" ("eine ernsthafte Gefahr für die Meinungsfreiheit").

The day before the Parliament vote, the Frankfurter Allgemeine Zeitung reported that Germany may have caved in to support the Directive at the last minute in exchange for France's approval of the controversial Nord Stream 2 project, a natural gas pipeline from Russia. MEP Tiemo Wölken, a member of the SDP and opponent of the Directive, claimed that this had been rumoured before the report was published.

=== Non-governmental organisations ===
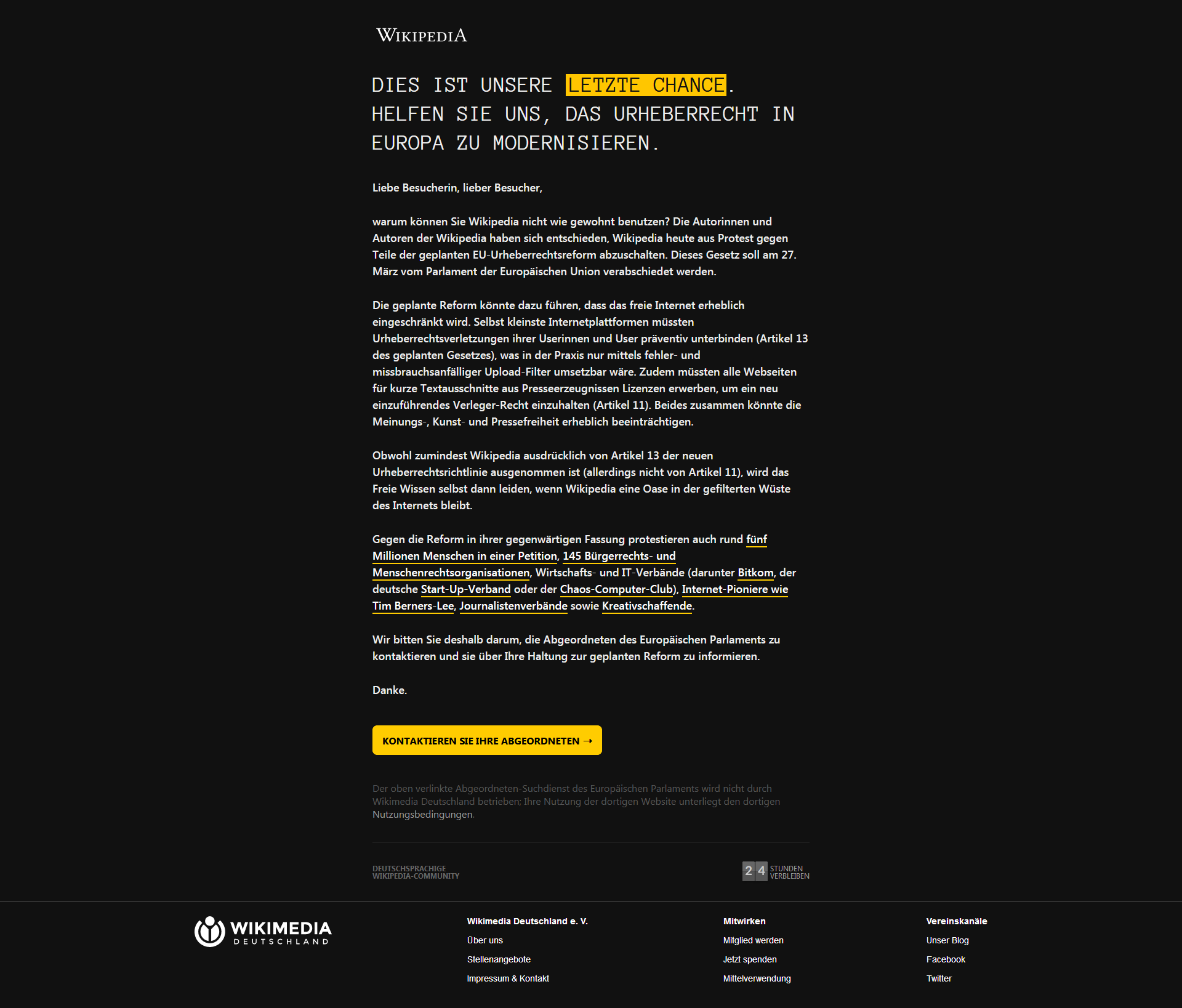
Blackout of German Wikipedia - 21 March 2019

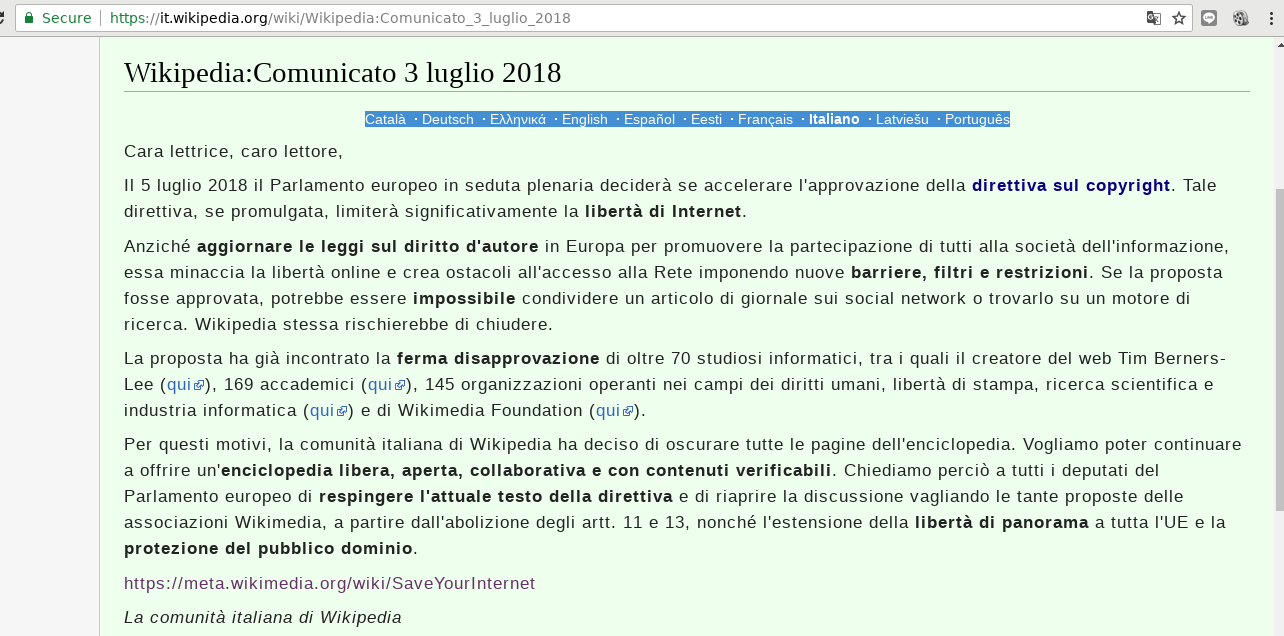
The banner block on Italian Wikipedia. Other blocked Wikipedias had similar messages.

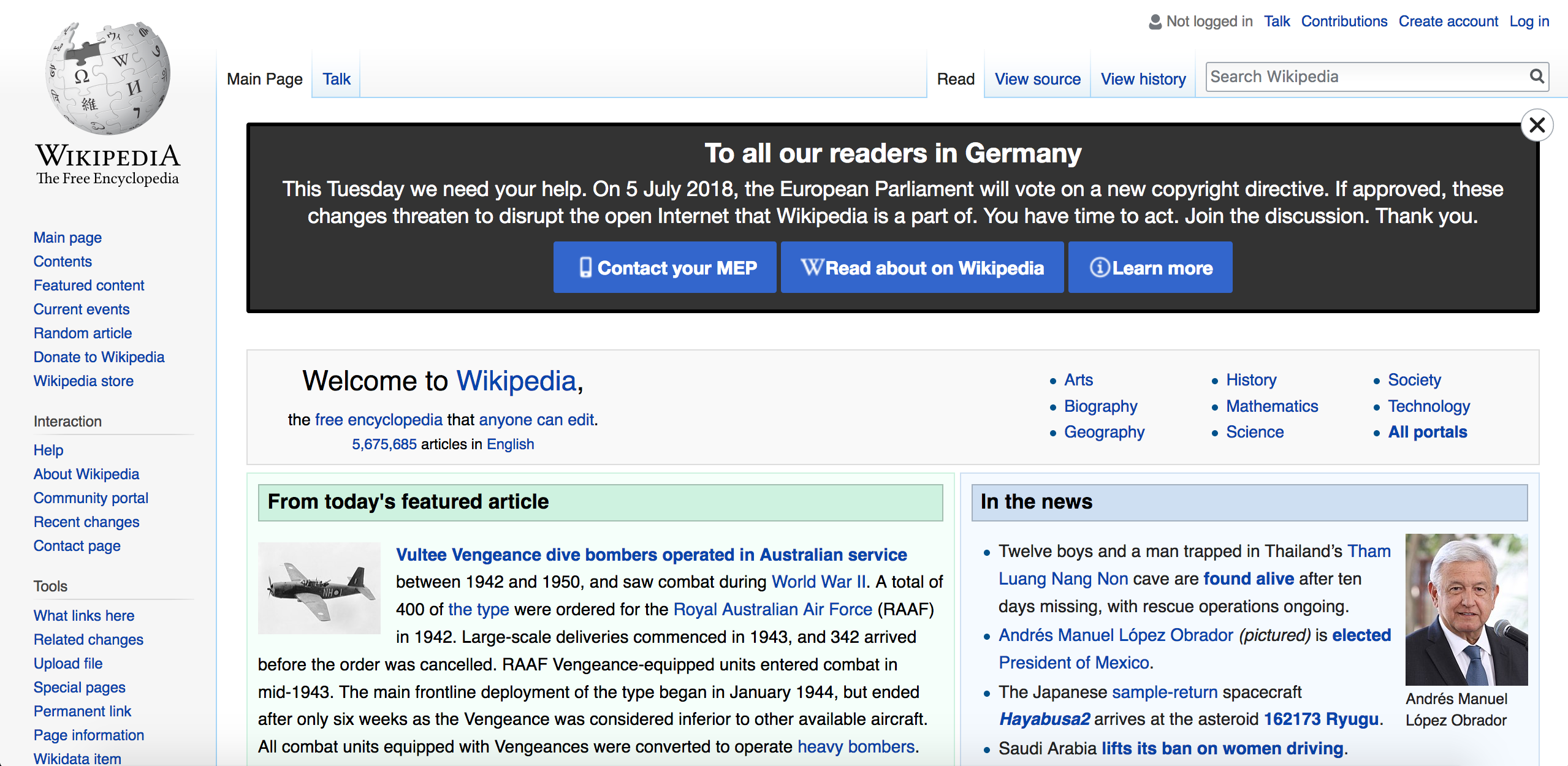
The banner on the English Wikipedia seen from a German IP address

In 2017, Human Rights Watch and Reporters Without Borders were among the signatories of an open letter opposing Article 13. 145 organisations from the areas of human and digital rights, media freedom, publishing, libraries, educational institutions, software developers, and Internet service providers signed a letter opposing the proposed legislation on 26 April 2018. Some of those opposed include the Electronic Frontier Foundation, Creative Commons, European Digital Rights, the Max Planck Society, GitHub, various Wikimedia chapters, and the Wikimedia Foundation (the parent organisation of Wikipedia).

The Italian Wikipedia, later followed by others including the Spanish, Estonian, Latvian, Polish, French, and Portuguese editions, "blacked-out" its pages for readers on 3–5 July 2018, while the English Wikipedia added a banner asking readers in Europe to contact their representatives in the European Parliament. The Wikimedia Foundation reiterated its concerns in February 2019. Four editions of Wikipedia—German, Danish, Czech and Slovak—were blacked-out for 24 hours on 21 March 2019 to further protest the directive. Wikipedia co-founder Jimmy Wales raised concerns regarding the costs and effectiveness of upload filters and possible negative effects upon free speech online.

=== Technology companies ===
Google (which operates the Google News aggregation site which would be affected) has opposed the directive since its first inception in 2016, when they argued that the proposals would "turn the internet into a place where everything uploaded to the web must be cleared by lawyers". According to Kent Walker, Senior Vice President for Global Affairs and Chief Legal Officer at Google, "Companies that act reasonably in helping rights holders identify and control the use of their content shouldn’t be held liable for anything a user uploads, any more than a telephone company should be liable for the content of conversations." In 2018 the company encouraged news publishers in its Digital News Initiative to lobby MEPs on the proposals, members of the initiative are eligible for grants to support digital journalism from a €150m fund. YouTube's chief executive officer, Susan Wojcicki, urged content creators on the platform to take action to oppose the legislation, as it "poses a threat to both [their] livelihood and [their] ability to share [their] voice with the world", and stressing that their Content ID system was intended to help assure fair management and payments for copyright holders already without government intervention. Wojcicki later wrote that any company implementing the necessary protocols to meet the directive would have a significant financial burden, and for a company the scale of YouTube, "the potential liabilities could be so large that no company could take on such a financial risk". Facebook was also opposed, arguing that the proposal "could have serious, unintended consequences for an open and creative internet".

The Computer and Communications Industry Association, a trade association that represents Google and other large technology companies, is a principal funder of the Copyright for Creativity organisation, a coalition that led the "Save Your Internet" campaign opposing the directive. Reddit in November 2018 referred their European users to a website called "Don't Wreck the Net".

As of June 2023, Google had reached copyright licensing agreements with 1,500 publications in order to come into compliance with the Directive.

As of October 2026 there are no widely reported cases in which the scenarios warned of by Facebook, Google and other industry critics actually materialised; while anecdotal evidence of overblocking persists, it does not appear to be a widespread problem.

=== Academics ===
More than 200 academics have criticised the directive, emphasising concerns about the effectiveness of Article 11's impact on the readership of online publication and of Article 13's obligations on service providers that will "benefit big players". SPARC Europe called for the removal of Article 11, arguing that it would "make the last two decades of news less accessible to researchers and the public, leading to a distortion of the public's knowledge and memory of past events", and if extended to academic publishing, would "in effect ask readers to pay publishers for access to works for which authors, institutions or research funders had already paid publishers to make freely accessible to all under 'open access' terms". Twenty-five research centres common on concerns that the financial benefits from the proposed directive will occur to large rightsholders rather than creators, with creators simple being used as "frontmen/women".

The proposal is generally supported by academic publishers including the International Association of Scientific, Technical, and Medical Publishers. This group has nevertheless criticised the proposal for excluding scientific publishers from the provisions of Article 11, describing the exclusion as "unwarranted and potentially discriminatory".

The European Council for Doctoral Candidates and Junior Researchers opposes the proposal on the grounds that Article 13's exemption for non-commercial groups does not cover all scientific repositories, and cites the Horizon 2020 project as an example of commercial work in the sector. They also generally agree with the claims of other opponents. The Scholarly Publishing and Academic Resources Coalition, an open access advocacy group, opposes the proposal in principle.

=== Publishers ===
A campaign organised by the European Grouping of Societies of Authors and Composers collected over 32,000 signatures in 2018 from creators including David Guetta, Ennio Morricone, Jean-Michel Jarre, and the band Air. Other supporters in 2018 include musicians Paul McCartney and James Blunt, author Philip Pullman (as head of the Society of Authors), the Independent Music Companies Association, and German publisher Axel Springer.

Publishing trade bodies similarly claim that a "bad-faith" "misleading campaign", is being carried out. They specifically name Wikipedia and Google as orchestrators, claiming that Wikipedia and other platforms engaged in "inacceptable [sic] misleading campaigns [...] to influence MEPs" and pointing out that Google spent €4.5 million lobbying in Europe during 2016, is among the sponsors of the Electronic Frontier Foundation, another leading opponent, and was seen asking its partners to lobby against the reform. These estimates have been called "flawed" and that how much Google has spent on lobbying on this issue is not possible to determine. These estimates were also released by the music industry as a press release just before the JURI voted.

The publishers argue that licensed content providers such as Spotify and Netflix are also negatively affected by the current copyright regime, which they say benefits user-driven platforms such as YouTube (owned by the parent company of Google) and Facebook. They claim reports of spambots flooding MEPs with so many anti-copyright emails that they can no longer carry out their work.

While some publishers support the proposal, European Innovative Media Publishers, a publishing industry lobbying organisation, was founded in 2015 specifically to oppose Article 11.

=== Newspapers ===
Some newspapers in support of the directive pejoratively label some of those opposed as "the largest, richest corporate entities in the world". In an editorial, the Financial Times stated that "YouTube controls 60 per cent of all streaming audio business, but pays only 11 per cent of the revenues that artists receive". Others newspapers focus on Article 11, arguing that the reform is a battle between European media pluralism and monopolistic foreign Internet giants. A variety of mainstream newspapers have reported that some Internet platforms are lobbying against the bill to support their financial interests.

A group of nine major European press publishers including Agence France-Presse, the Press Association, and the European Alliance of News Agencies issued a letter supporting the proposal, describing it as "key for the media industry, the consumer’s future access to news, and ultimately a healthy democracy". In the letter, they cite existing state support for struggling news media and argue that it should instead be provided by the "internet giants" which have been "siphoning off" advertising revenue.

Critical accounts of the proposal were published in the summer of 2018 by major newspapers in Austria, France, Germany, Ireland, Italy, Poland, Spain, and Slovakia.

=== Content creators ===
The International Federation of Journalists, a union, complained about late amendments which made remuneration of journalists dependent on "contractual arrangements" and "laws on ownership". While describing the proposals as "an achievement for authors overall" and "good news for the industry and for authors in some sectors", they described the amendments as "bad for journalism and bad for Europe" and called on the EU to "decide wisely and reject any discriminatory provisions".

A representative from a company that makes content filters states that their wide introduction as while result from article 13 will likely hurt new music artists by limiting their ability to share what they create.

=== Prominent individuals ===
Individuals who have publicly opposed the law include comedian Stephen Fry; author Neil Gaiman; Tim Berners-Lee, creator of the World Wide Web; and Vint Cerf, co-inventor of the Internet protocol suite.

=== Case law ===
In 2012, the European Court of Justice ruled that existing EU law "must be interpreted as precluding a national court from issuing an injunction against a hosting service provider which requires it to install a system for filtering...with a view to preventing works from being made available to the public in breach of copyright", arguing that such an injunction "could potentially undermine freedom of information, since that system might not distinguish adequately between unlawful content and lawful content, with the result that its introduction could lead to the blocking of lawful communications". Also see.

=== Human rights ===
The Office of the United Nations High Commissioner for Human Rights raised concerns that the proposal was incompatible with the 1966 International Covenant on Civil and Political Rights. In a public letter, special rapporteur, David Kaye, argued that the proposal's reluctance to pin down precise obligations on content hosts created "significant legal uncertainty" inconsistent with the covenant's requirement that any restrictions on freedom of expression be "provided by law". He concluded that this could lead to "pressure on content sharing providers to err on the side of caution". Kaye also criticised the lack of "prior judicial review" inherent in the system, and the similarly extrajudicial nature of its appeals process. He acknowledges that while copyright law needs to be modernised in Europe it should not be done in a way that harms freedom of expression and that the current recommendations within article 13 are not needed.

The letter also raised concerns regarding the lack of protection for non-profit groups, although such groups had been excluded from the proposal's provisions prior to its publication.

== Controversy ==
=== Articles 15 and 17 (draft articles 11 and 13) ===
Articles 11 and 13 of the draft Directive, prior to Trilogue negotiations and since moved to Articles 15 and 17 in the final, passed version, have drawn a great deal of attention and opposition. Article 11, referred to as the "link tax", generated concerns that less information and fewer resources would be available through search engines. In their explanatory memorandum for Article 11, the Council describes existing rights enforcement for the online use of press publications as "complex and inefficient". They also draw particular attention to the use of news articles by "news aggregators or media-monitoring services" for commercial purposes, and the problems that would face press publishers in licensing their work to such services. After the European Commission analysed the implementation of similar laws in Germany and Spain, they found that newspapers actually benefited financially from the increased exposure to their online articles.

Germany (with the ancillary copyright for press publishers law) and Spain tested a link tax: it was considered a "complete disaster" which cost them millions of euros. Google shut down Google News in Spain and stopped using linked snippets of German articles completely. Experts predicted that such a link tax would lead to the Internet in Europe being more dominated by large media corporations, since it would be too time-consuming and costly for small online media companies to reach their own separate legal agreements to allow a link or quotes. As a result, they felt, many small media companies in Europe would eventually be forced to shut down due to a lack of online exposure and revenue.

Article 13, colloquially called the "upload filter" provision, has faced widespread criticism over the possibility that it could have a "chilling effect" on online expression, as it would force most web services to stop users uploading copyrighted content without authorization, or else the service would risk being held liable for infringements of its guidelines. Although the article requires only "best efforts" from providers, larger companies would need to use expensive content-matching technology similar to YouTube's Content ID system, which cost Google about $100 million to develop. Others are concerned that due to the cost of filtering, only major U.S. technology firms would have sufficient resources to develop them, and that outsourcing the task by EU companies would then have privacy and data protection implications.

The controversy over Article 13 has led Internet pioneers including Tim Berners-Lee, Vint Cerf, Jimmy Wales, and Mitch Kapor to warn that "Article 13 takes an unprecedented step towards the transformation of the Internet from an open platform for sharing and innovation, into a tool for the automated surveillance and control of its users." The organisation said that "online content filtering could be the end of the internet as we know it", as memes, video parodies and any other content containing copyrighted videos, photos and or sound would be effectively brought down. Also, collaborative projects like Wikipedia and Gitlab would have very limited options because the users would need to pay for any source or image that is copyrighted.

The media lawyers Christian Solmecke and Anne-Christine Herr reported in their analysis of the negotiated compromise that it inherits the duty to use an upload filter because no other technique exists to fulfil the requirements of the law. They point out alternative solutions to extract enhanced license fees from an online provider without restricting the rights of private users by filtering all uploads—i.e., by according private copying levy.

Critics have also noted the issue of false positives within such systems, and their inability to account for copyright limitations such as fair dealing and parody (leading, they state, to a "meme ban"). Supporters and third parties pointed out that YouTube has used Content ID for a decade and yet remains a successful host for content of all kinds. However, the system still suffers from false positives, copyright trolls, and scammers leveraging YouTube's handling of copyright claims under the U.S. Online Copyright Infringement Liability Limitation Act (OCILLA)—a component of the Digital Millennium Copyright Act (DMCA)—as a form of extortion, by placing false copyright claims on a user's content until they pay a ransom (aiming to have the account taken down unless they pay), or doxxing by means of the requirement to include personal contact information when performing a counterclaim under this law.

The CEO of YouTube, Susan Wojcicki, warned that the legislation "poses a threat to both your livelihood and your ability to share your voice with the world", and that under Article 13, the site may – even on content it does have a license to host – be required to clear every possible copyright associated with a video or be prevented from streaming it within the EU, and do the same at scale for every piece of video uploaded by users. The CEO of Twitch, Emmett Shear, has also criticised Article 13.

After its passing, Pirate Party MEP Felix Reda pointed out that Article 13 may violate the Canada/EU Comprehensive Economic and Trade Agreement (CETA), which states that its parties must provide "limitations or exceptions" on the liability of intermediary communications service providers in regards to copyright infringement, and that they must not be "conditioned on the service provider monitoring its service, or affirmatively seeking facts indicating infringing activity".

Maltese YouTuber and musician Grandayy was an outspoken opponent of Article 13, believing the law could "kill the internet". He also warned that all broadcasters could face censorship from automated bots. In 2019, he summarized the position most YouTubers held:

The reaction of YouTubers has been virtually unanimous against Article 13. The sad thing is that us YouTubers have no lobby groups or unions that can fight for us and speak to politicians directly for us. Most politicians have no idea about the troubles YouTubers face with copyright, or what type of content the typical YouTuber even produces.

=== Public protests ===
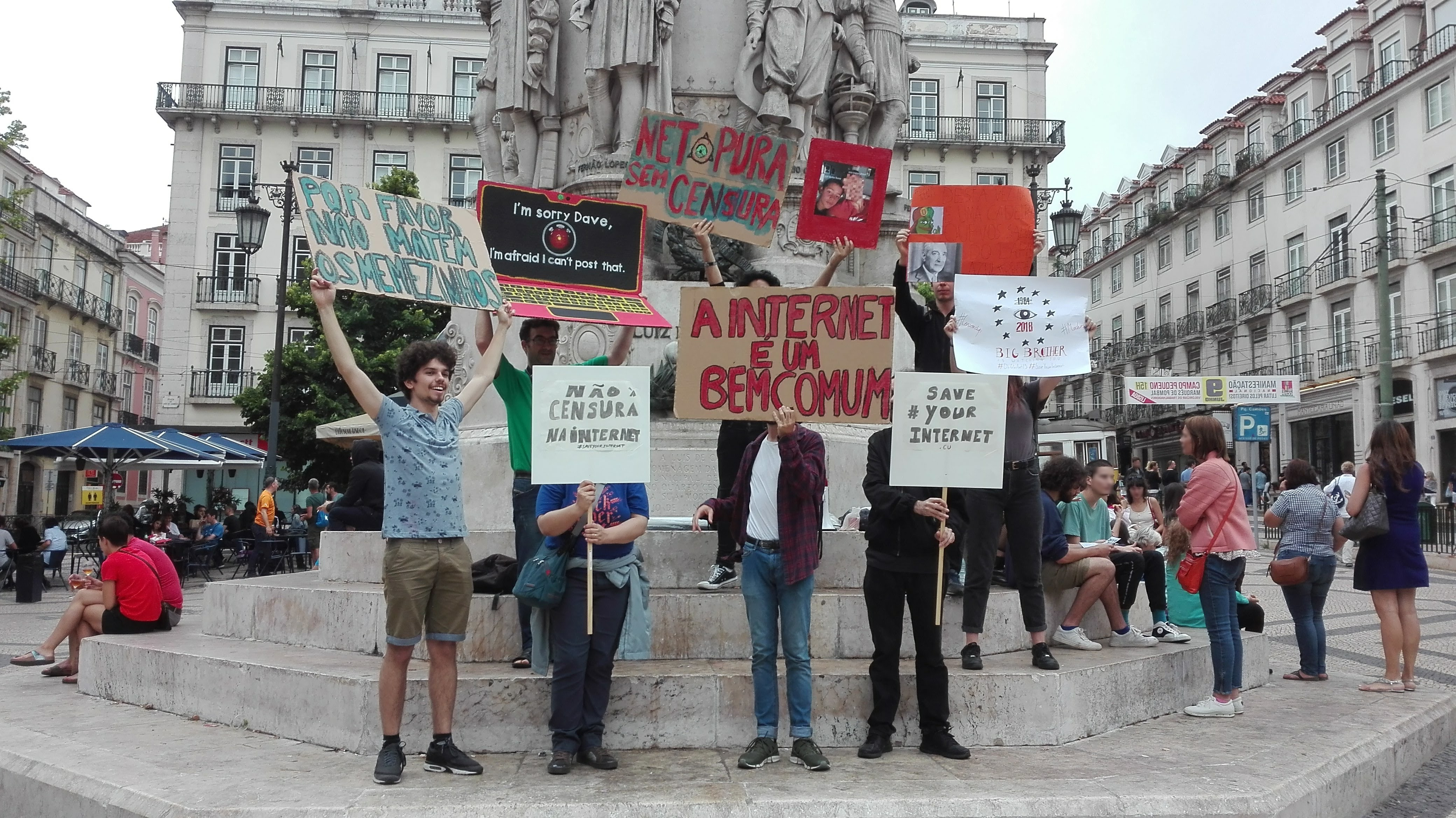
Public protests against article 11 and 13 in Lisbon in July 2018

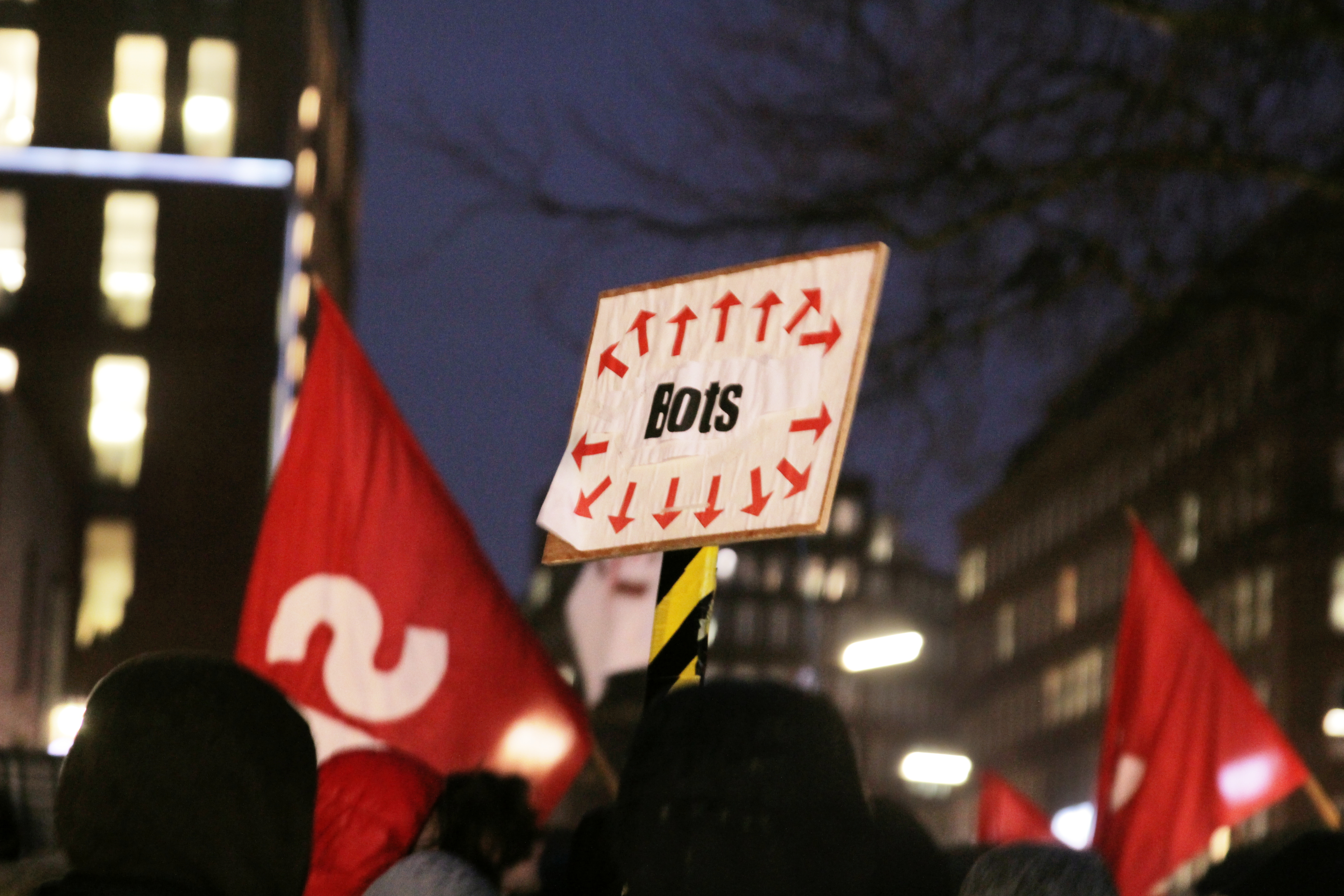
Protests in Hamburg on 6 March 2019 against the EU Copyright Directive

A Change.org petition has gathered more than 5 million signatures as of 21 March 2019 which oppose the directive, of which roughly 1.3 million are from Germany. As of February 2019, it has gathered the most signatures in European history.

A number of public protests have been held in opposition to the proposed directive, mainly concerning Article 11 and 13. European wide protests on 23 March 2019 saw tens to hundreds of thousands of people marching. One estimate put the number at 40,000 people in Munich and 15,000 in Berlin. Another estimate indicated 30,000 people in Berlin and more than 100,000 in Germany overall. A 16 February 2019 protest organised by German YouTube stars in Cologne attracted a significant crowd despite having only been announced two days earlier. German news media gave reports of attendance, with one report describing "several hundred participants", another "over 1000", and a third "1500" based on police reports. A second protest in Cologne on 23 February 2019 had a reported attendance of more than 3000. Demonstrators attributed problems of the bill to Axel Voss and the CDU party. A protest in Berlin on 2 March attracted roughly 3,500. The protests are being organised by a grassroots movement and are raising funds by GoFundMe.

After the European People's Party tried to move the vote on the directive ahead to circumvent the planned protests on 23 March 2019, demonstrations were organised at short notice in ten German cities, including Berlin, between 5 and 9 March 2019. Following public protests, the European People's Party claimed that they did not try to move the vote forwards despite evidence to the contrary. Additionally, the request to move the vote forwards may not have been withdrawn as of 5 March 2019.

Smaller prior EU-wide events occurred in August 2018 and January 2019. Organisers did not release their own figures, but supporters of the proposals based on photos from the August events estimated that there had been at most 800 participants across the continent, with an average of 30 per location.

Several European websites, including the European versions of Wikipedia, Twitch, and Reddit, disabled some or many of the features on their websites on 21 March 2019 as a means to protest and raise awareness of the pending vote and encourage users to contact their appropriate national body to affect the vote. This was similar to action taken on 18 January 2012 by numerous websites to protest similar laws proposed in the United States.

=== Lobbying ===
The European Parliament claimed that "MEPs have rarely or even never been subject to a similar degree of lobbying", and that there have been prior "lobbying campaigns predicting catastrophic outcomes, which have never come true". The Times reported that "Google is helping to fund a website that encourages people to spam politicians and newspapers with automated messages backing its policy goals". MEP Sven Schulze stated that he believed Google to be behind the email campaign because many of the emails came from Gmail addresses.

Lobbying in favour of the proposed directive was directed toward the EU itself and was much less visible to the public. The large media groups and publishers have had much greater contact between their lobbyists and MEPs than the technology industry. Stunts pulled by those lobbying in favour include sending MEPs pamphlets with condoms attached with the phrase "We love tech giants, we love protection too".

The EU Commission, in a since withdrawn blog post, stated that those who opposed the directive were a "mob". The Commissioners technically responsible for such posts, Mariya Gabriel and Andrus Ansip, both deny authorizing its publication. The European Commission has also apologized for its publication. Jean-Claude Juncker, the head of the EU Commission, declined after a direct request to answer who authorized its publication.

Some commentators stated years of intense lobbying served to "crowd out other voices and successfully distort the public debate", and that "toxic" discussions were harming "healthy dialogue". Those in support of the directive, however, carried out negotiations without public oversight, and when the general public became involved in discussing the directive online the EU commission referred to them as a "mob".

=== Voting issues ===
Before the vote on the directive, a vote was held on whether to consider amendments, which would have allowed the possibility of separating Articles 11 and 13 into separate votes. The proposal fell short by 5 votes. It was reported after the fact that 13 MEPs had requested that their votes be changed, since they voted incorrectly due to alleged confusion over the order of voting. The revised results added 10 votes in favour of amendments. However, these corrections are strictly for parliamentary records only, and do not change the result of the vote.

=== Bomb threat ===
According to German media reports, an online bomb threat was posted against Axel Voss' office in Bonn claiming that a bomb had been placed at the office, and it would be detonated should the EU Parliament vote to back the proposed copyright reforms. The message had originally been posted on an obscure Finnish Linux Forum, before being brought to wider attention on Reddit. It has since been removed while an investigation by regional police was initiated.

=== United Kingdom position ===
On 31 January 2020, the United Kingdom left the European Union. The transition period was scheduled to expire on 31 December 2020. The UK Government has therefore declared that, since the date for EU member states to transpose the directive into national law is in 2021, the UK will not be implementing the copyright directive in full. Government minister Chris Skidmore stated: "The deadline for implementing the EU Copyright Directive is 7 June 2021. The United Kingdom will leave the European Union on 31 January 2020 and the Implementation Period will end on 31 December 2020. The Government has committed not to extend the Implementation Period. Therefore, the United Kingdom will not be required to implement the Directive, and the Government has no plans to do so. Any future changes to the UK copyright framework will be considered as part of the usual domestic policy process." UK Culture Minister Nigel Adams said that, despite the Government supporting many of the overall aims of the directive, the UK's "imminent departure from the EU means we are not required to implement the Copyright Directive in full."

== See also ==
- Copyright Directive (disambiguation) (lists the EU directives on copyright)
- Copyright law of the European Union
- Digital Millennium Copyright Act of 1998
- Electronic Commerce Directive 2000
- News Media Bargaining Code in Australia
- Online News Act in Canada
- Stop Online Piracy Act – rejected US law that would have expanded copyright enforcement
- Streaming media
- Online Safety Act
- EU Digital Service
- Chat Control - proposed in the EU
