= Freedom of the press in Spain =

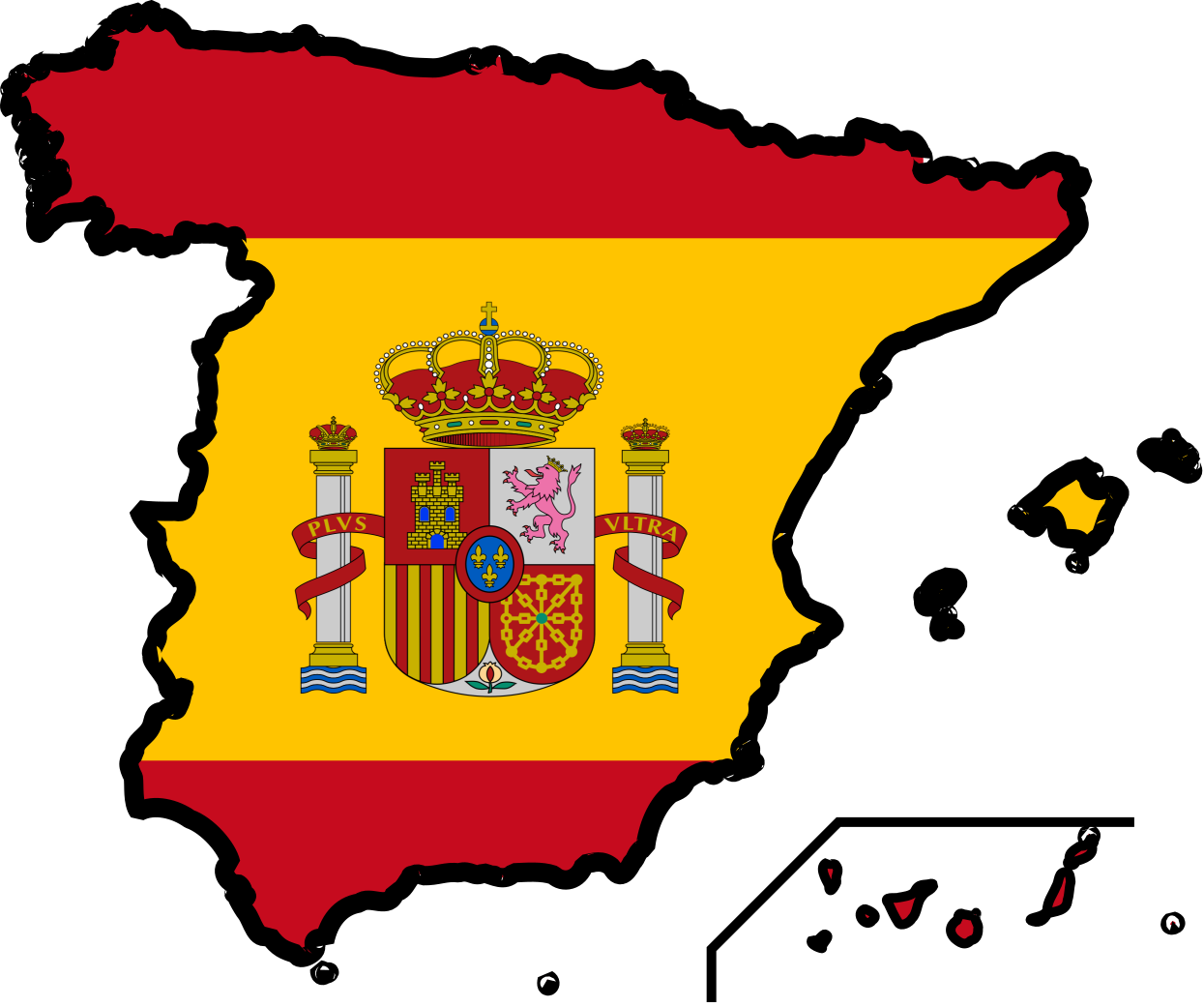
Spain

The freedom of the press in Spain, a constitutional monarchy with a parliamentary democracy, is guaranteed in section 20 of its constitution written in 1978, after the 1975 end of the dictatorship of General Francisco Franco. Spain was ranked at 29th place in the World Press Freedom Index in 2017.

== Spanish Constitution ==
The Spanish Constitution, during its national referendum on December 6 of 1978, guaranteed the freedom of press in section 20 by stating the following:

- "The following rights are recognized and protected: the right to freely express and spread thoughts, ideas and opinions through words, in writing or by any other means of reproduction";
- "The right to freely communicate or receive truthful information by any means of dissemination whatsoever. The law shall regulate the right to the clause of conscience and professional secrecy in the exercise of these freedoms".

These changes contrast with General Franco's Fuero established in 1945, that restrained many fundamental human rights.

Section 149 of the constitution of Spain states that the state shall have exclusive competence over the following matters: "Basic rules relating to organization of the press, radio and television and, in general, all mass-communications media without prejudice to powers vested in the Self-governing Communities for their development and implementation."

== Freedom of the press in different sectors of Spain ==
Legal Environment in Freedom of the Press

Freedom of press

As freedom of expression is guaranteed in section 20 of the constitution, the freedom of the press must be respected and put in practice.

Since 2012 freedom of the press has suffered of effects because of the European economic crisis. The country created a campaign named “Right to be Forgotten” against Google in 2011, ordering Google to remove 90 articles from citizens who wanted their old information to be deleted. This case was taken to the Court of Justice and it is still pending.

In March 2012, the government began to enforce the Sinde Law, a new measure that allows for blocking websites containing copyrighted content. The authorities have a lot to do with controlling what is revealed. They monitor websites and social network accounts.

November 2014 was a time of change, a new Intellectual Property Act was reinforced to the blockage of websites. The law established a Google Tax, a system of a mandatory economic charges that apply to the news aggregators in order to compensate producers.

Political Environment in Freedom of the Press

From a political aspect in the freedom of the press in Spain, journalists and other observers alleged that there is a growing government influence. The Corporación Radio Televisión Española oversees the public media, creating journalists and observers to see the influence of the government.

By the end of 2014 and beginning of 2015, a change of the body's leadership in the aspect of the freedom to express in Spain happened. These changes were interpreted by the critics as a sign of an increase in the government control. Journalists claimed that a self-censorship in the general aspect had risen, due to the political pressure and the threat of the layoffs; because of the ongoing economic crisis.

Economic Environment in Freedom of the Press

The economic crisis that Spain has suffered, affected the country's media industry. According to the Madrid Press Association, between 2008 and 2015, 386 media outlets had to close because they couldn't stand anymore; they had to cut journalists and press members which led to a decline in jobs. Having underpaid or unpaid freelancers used as journalists have led to a lost in journalism's prestige.

Due to this problem, independent editors had to urged for lawmakers to address the issue to the New Transparency Act, but the changes were not made. The media set of Spain controls 70% of the private television network, which is a diverse media sector of public and private outlets, that still lack of a regulatory framework.

== History ==
=== Censorship during Franco’s dictatorship ===
Censorship is the power that is exercised by the government to prohibit the publishing of any news, book, movie or document that can attempt against the state.

The main objective behind will always be to limit, control the freedom of expression especially in those cases where the opinion given goes against the government's ideas.

Therefore, censorship is one of the most used resources by governments who have a form of ruling very close to a dictatorship just like General Francisco Franco's government. Consequently, everything related to journalism and the different forms of expression art will be the target of this type of governments as it was back in 1938–1973.

=== Laws ===
Established in 1966, the Printing and Press law, also known as Franco's Press Law and the Fraga Law claimed to diminish the restrictions on press. However, newspapers were still censored, and by 1988 the 1966 law had not been replaced by a law granting true freedom to the Spanish press.

==== Continuity of problems with freedom of the press ====
The problem of freedom of press continues to experience a negative impact on the country's ongoing economic and financial crisis, leading to a decline in the media diversity. The lack of access to information is one of the greatest barriers to a press that must aspire to represent many interests of the Spanish citizens.

Most journalists in Spain who deal with agencies have had their war stories trying to grab basic facts about subjects that are important to the Spanish population. Due to the lack of freedom of press in the country, the most distrusted professions have to due with politics, judiciary and journalism works.

The most traditional media rely on economic and financial groups that control and influence many politicians and the media itself. The media ownerships is very dense and obscure, since the influence of economical and financial aspects are put on trial; creating a pattern of the public money spent on advertising.

A report made by the Madrid Press Association found out that 77% of the journalists rated their independence as poor or very poor. While 56% had been pressured to modified and make new stories.

Javier Sierra examines the history of media freedom and the freedom of information in the country. He identifies that one of the major obstacles to have an independent journalism is the lack of freedom of press. He emphasizes a huge need for a legal reform with international standards.

== Cases against Press freedom in Spain ==
- Lawsuit against El País Newspaper Filed by Partido Popular and Five of its Leaders- pg 17
- Lawsuit against Revista Leer Filed by Juan Cotarelo García- pg 19
- Appeal by José Luis Gutiérrez against the Kingdom of Spain at the European Court of Human Rights- pg 20
- Criminal Lawsuit Filed by the Public Prosecutor against Cadena SER's Daniel Anido and Rodolfo Irago - pg 24
- Criminal Lawsuit Filed by Manuel Chaves against El Mundo Journalists Francisco Rosell and Javier Caraballo- pg 25
- The Partido Popular Information Boycott against PRISA - pg 26
