= Computer Law & Security Review =

- Discipline: Intellectual Property, Information Technology, Telecommunications law, Data protection, software protection, IT contracts, Internet law, Electronic commerce, Computer Law
- Language: English

Publication details
- History: 1985 to present
- Publisher: Elsevier (UK)

Standard abbreviations
- ISO 4: Comput. Law Secur. Rev.

Indexing
- ISSN: 0267-3649

Links
- Journal homepage

The Computer Law & Security Review is an international peer-reviewed journal published by Elsevier. It has been published six times a year since 1985 and is indexed in Scopus and SSCI. It is accessible to a wide range of professional legal and IT practitioners, businesses, academics, researchers, libraries and organisations in both the public and private sectors. The journal regularly covers:

- CLSR Briefing with special emphasis on UK/US developments
- European Union update
- National news from 10 European jurisdictions
- Pacific rim news column
- Refereed practitioner and academic papers on topics such as Web 2.0, IT security, Identity management, ID cards, RFID, interference with privacy, Internet law, telecoms regulation, online broadcasting, intellectual property, software law, e-commerce, outsourcing, data protection and freedom of information and many other topics.

The Journal's Correspondent Panel includes more than 40 specialists in IT law and security.

Each issue contains articles, case law analysis and current news on information and communications technology.

Special Features

- High quality peer reviewed papers from internationally renowned practitioner and academic experts
- Latest developments reported in situ by more than 20 leading law firms from around the world
- Highly experienced and respected editor and correspondents panel
- Online access to all 23 volumes of CLSR with embedded web links to primary sources
- Contact details of all authors
- A pool of expertise that can collectively identify the key topics that need to be examined.
