= NewsRight =

NewsRight, LLC
- Founded: January 2012
- Headquarters: New York City
- Key people: David Westin, CEO
- Owner: Associated Press (& 28 others)
- Number of employees: 10+

NewsRight, LLC (formerly News Licensing Group, NLG) is an online content-tracking and licensing company. The company tracks original content using encoded hidden data which sends back to the registry information on where the content is being used. This information is used by NewsRight to convert unauthorized websites, blogs and newsgathering services into paying customers. The company does not own the copyrights to the content; its role is limited to brokering business relationships and contracts.

NewsRight was launched on January 5, 2012 as a partnership between the Associated Press and 28 other news organizations. David Westin, former head of ABC News, was named its first CEO. The AP began their own tracking technology in October 2010—known as News Registry—to help publishers track and license their content online. News Registry was spun off as the News Licensing Group (NLG) in July 2011 before being launched in its current form in January 2012. As of January 2012, negotiations are ongoing to bring aboard Gannett Company, Tribune Company, Cox Enterprises and News Corporation as participants.

The company's launch is said by analysts to be motivated by news-filtering services such as Meltwater and news aggregators such as The Huffington Post. The AP has spent years fighting the free sharing of content online which has disrupted its traditional role as a newswire.

== Founding members ==
- Advance Publications
- Associated Press
- Axel Springer AG
- A. H. Belo Management Services
- Belo Management Services
- Business Wire
- Community Newspaper Holdings
- El Día
- Galveston Newspapers
- GateHouse Media
- The Gazette Company
- Hearst Newspapers
- Journal Communications
- Landmark Media Enterprises
- The McClatchy Company
- Media General
- MediaNews Group
- Morris Communications
- Morris Multimedia
- NPG Newspapers
- The New York Times Company
- Ogden Newspapers
- Pioneer Newspapers
- Schurz Communications
- E. W. Scripps Company
- Stephens Media
- Times Publishing Company
- The Washington Post Company
