= Google tax =

Term for anti-tax avoidance measures

'Google tax' is a popular term used to refer to anti-avoidance provisions that have been passed in several jurisdictions dealing with profits or royalties that have been diverted to other jurisdictions with lower or nil rates.

== Diverted profits tax ==
The UK and Australia measures took effect in advance of the Base erosion and profit shifting measures being considered at recent G20 summits.

=== United Kingdom ===
Effective for accounting periods beginning on or after 1 April 2015, the Finance Act 2015 imposes a levy on company profits—excluding those of small and medium-sized enterprises—that are routed via "contrived arrangements" to tax havens. The arrangements can concern either those that involve entities or transactions lacking economic substance, or efforts by a non-UK company to avoid a UK taxable presence. Companies that determine that they are subject to the tax have a statutory duty to notify Her Majesty's Revenue and Customs of that fact within three months after the end of the accounting period in question.

The UK tax is set at 6 percentage points above the headline corporation tax rate, or 31% of taxable diverted profits for a company with annual profits over £250,000 (55% with respect to ring fence profits), and was in 2014 forecast by UK Treasury to Raise £350m annually by 2017–18.

The Confederation of British Industry (CBI) described the effort to impose taxation on diverted profits as "a real concern for global business". Chas Roy-Chowdhury, head of taxation at the Association of Chartered Certified Accountants (ACCA), said, "It's a bit like reporting yourself to the police and then having to defend yourself."

Amazon announced in May 2015 that it will start paying tax in the UK on British retail sales rather than booking sales through Luxembourg, this will mean the group will not have to pay the diverted profit tax.

=== Australia ===
The term has similarly been applied to the Tax Laws Amendment (Combating Multinational Tax Avoidance) Act 2015 introduced in the May 2015 budget, which received Royal assent in December 2015. The provisions came into effect on 1 January 2016 "in connection with a scheme, whether or not the scheme was entered into, or was commenced to be carried out, before that day. "

The Australian measures focus on arrangements that attempt to avoid establishing a permanent establishment presence in Australia. While they were originally intended to target a group of thirty large multinational corporations, other taxpayers will still need to document whether they would be subject to the provisions, as the Australian Taxation Office would have the power to assess an administrative penalty of 100% of any calculated shortfall of tax owed, together with base tax and interest.

In the 2016 Australian federal budget, the government announced the introduction of a diverted profits tax (DPT) from 1 July 2017. The Diverted Profits Tax Act 2017 imposes a 40 percent tax on avoidance schemes entered into by significant global entities (SGEs), which are defined as global parent entities with an annual global income of A$1 billion or more.

== Royalty charges ==
The term has also been used to refer to a tax in Spain, introduced in 2014, that imposes a royalty charge on Google when its news site, Google News, uses material belonging to a Spanish publisher. Google's response was to cease collating such articles on Google News.
