= File sharing in Singapore =

Aspect of digital media distribution

File sharing in Singapore relates to the distribution of digital media in that country. In January 2019, there were about 12,971,500 households connected with a broadband connection to the Internet in Singapore. There are also many public Internet access points (Wireless LAN) such as public libraries and Internet cafes.

Public opinion in Singapore shows that 1 in 2 are okay with illegal downloads, although 4 in 5 (or 82% of >1000 respondents) Singaporeans say protecting Intellectual property (IP) is important according to the latest Intellectual Property Office of Singapore report released in November 2014. The same belief did not seem to translate for online activities, more than 55% (down from 78% in a similar the survey in 2010) think that unauthorised downloading is a theft. On the other side consumers also pointed to the lack of available legal methods of downloading digital content, such as Netflix etc.

== Legislation ==
The Copyright Act (Singapore) 2014 are applicable to and may be breached by file sharing activity.

The Copyright Act (Singapore) 2014 aims to protect the intellectual property rights of the creator or copyright holder. File sharing violates this act when the copyright owner has not given permission for its material to be shared.

== Action to prevent illegal file sharing ==
=== Recording Industry Association of Singapore ===
On 17 October 2006, the Recording Industry Association of Singapore filed cases of illegal music file-sharing. This basically results from obligations under the United States-Singapore Free Trade Agreement.

=== ODEX ===
Anime distributor ODEX has been actively tracking down and sending legal threats against individual BitTorrent users in Singapore since 2007.

In 2008, ODEX sought a pre-action discovery order against Pacific Internet (an internet services provider) which would have required Pacific Internet to disclose information about its subscribers to facilitate ODEX taking legal action against subscribers who were downloading infringing content via the BitTorrent protocol. The application was dismissed by the Singapore High Court on the basis that ODEX was not an owner or exclusive licensee of the content allegedly infringed, and therefore ODEX lacked standing to seek such a discovery order.

=== Dallas Buyers Club LLC ===
In April 2015, Samuel Seow Law Corporation represented Dallas Buyers Club LLC in sending demand letters to more than 500 subscribers asking for a written offer of damages and costs.

As a result of this pressure, the 2 main ISPs (Singtel and Starhub) became responsible for the notification of users identified by Dallas Buyers Club LLC. This notification could be a cease and desist order that will threaten legal action if the behaviour continues or if a compensation payment is not made. Further steps can also be taken by ISPs if the identified users continue to breach copyright, such as the restriction of the bandwidth available to them or even total disconnection and possible bans or suspensions from the Internet.

In April 2017, the same law firm tried to obtain the details of users who tried to download the movies 'Fathers and Daughters' and 'Queen of the Desert'. However, the Singapore High Court denied these applications, citing insufficient evidence.

=== Opposition ===
President Harish Pillay and vice-president Professor Ang Peng Hwa of Internet Society of Singapore (ISOC) stated, that "threatening subscribers won't stop copyright infringement."

== See also ==
- Trans-Pacific Partnership (TPP)
- Anti-Counterfeiting Trade Agreement (ACTA)
- Censorship in Singapore
- Copyright aspects of downloading and streaming
- Computer and network surveillance
- List of copyright acts § Singapore
- Internet censorship in Singapore
- Legal aspects of copyright infringement
- Legal aspects of file sharing
