= List of Nabari no Ou chapters =

The cover of the first tankōbon released in Japan by Square Enix on November 27, 2004, featuring Miharu Rokujou

The chapters of the manga series Nabari no Ou are written and illustrated by Yuhki Kamatani and have been serialized in Square Enix's magazine Monthly GFantasy since its premiere in the June 2004 issue. The plot follows Miharu Rokujou, a fourteen-year-old student who becomes able to control creation because a secret art called the Shinra Banshou has merged with his body. He tries to escape those wishing to possess the Shinra Banshou by searching for a non-lethal way to remove it.

Since the series' premiere, over sixty chapters have been released in Japan. The individual chapters are published in tankōbon by Square Enix under their Gangan Comics imprint. The first volume was released on November 27, 2004, and as of December 9, 2009, twelve volumes have been released. The chapters were adapted into an anime series directed by Kunihisa Sugishima, and animated by J.C.Staff. It began airing in April 2008 and ended its run in September 2008.

On April 19, 2008, at New York Comic Con, Yen Press announced that they had licensed the manga for an English language release in North America. The publisher also serializes the series in the Yen Plus anthology magazine, the first issue of which was released on July 29, 2008, with five Square Enix titles, including Nabari no Ou. The first collected volume of the series was released in May 2009 in North America, and as of October 2009, two volumes have been released. This series has been licensed in France by Asuka and in Taiwan by Sharp Point Press.

== Volume list ==
No.	Original release date	Original ISBN	English release date	English ISBN
1	November 27, 2004	978-4-7575-1327-3	May 12, 2009	978-0-7595-3003-4
001. "That Which Awakens" (目醒めるもの, "Me Sameru Mono"); 002. "Blood of the Oath" (誓いの血, "Chikai no Chi"); 003. "Raimei Cometh" (雷鳴来る, "Raimei Kuru"); 004. "Nonreciprocal Memories" (非相互の記憶, "Hi Sōgo no Kioku"); 005. "Attack" (襲撃, "Shūgeki")
Miharu Rokujou, an apathetic fourteen-year-old middle school student, is attacked by the ninja village Iga's Grey Wolf organization from Nabari, the underground subculture ninja live in. They claim he holds Nabari's coveted secret art, the Shinra Banshou, which allows the holder to control creation. As his teacher Tobari Kumohira and classmate Koichi Aizawa, both ninja, protect him from the ninja, Miharu hears the voice of the Shinra Banshou's spirit. She tells Miharu to draw from her powers to fulfill his greatest desire, but Tobari prevents him from doing so. After hearing the dangers of possessing and activating the Shinra Banshou, Miharu wishes to remove it. Until this is possible, Tobari asks Miharu to learn ninjutsu and become Nabari's ruler so he can be better protected. Soon after, Raimei Shimizu, who dislikes ninjutsu and has chosen become a samurai, arrives from the ninja village Fuuma to test Miharu. She believes Miharu might succumb to the Shinra Banshou's power and vows to kill him if he joins the Grey Wolves. Raimei, Miharu, Tobari and Aizawa decide to ask the leader of Fuuma Village, Kotarou Fuuma, for his opinion on the Shinra Banshou's removal. As they approach Fuuma Village, they learn the Grey Wolves attacked Fuuma Village to search for the village's kinjutsushō, a forbidden technique that gives the user a special ability while depriving the user of something else, because Kotarou has left the village. With the Grey Wolves is Yoite, a user of Iga's kinjutsushō Kira, which allows him to shoot his ki into an opponent and control the body from inside. The Grey Wolves attack Tobari, Aizawa and Raimei once they realize Miharu possesses the Shinra Banshou. When they begin to lose, The Grey Wolves flee with the kinjutsushō and leave Yoite to finish the battle. Before Yoite can kill Tobari, Kotarou returns.
2	April 27, 2005	978-4-7575-1422-5	October 27, 2009	978-0-7595-3036-2
006. "Kotarou Fuuma" (風魔 小太郎, "Fūma Kotarō"); 007. "Mission Announcement" (任務言渡, "Ninmu Gen Watashi"); 008. "Greed" (慾, "Yoku"); 009. "Palm" (掌, "Tenohira"); 010. "Choice" (選択, "Sentaku")
Although Fuuma Village agrees to help prevent the Shinra Banshou's use, Kotarou is not completely dedicated to the cause. Tobari, Aizawa and Kotarou believe the Grey Wolves are creating a ninjutsu to remove the Shinra Banshou and decide to do the same. The Grey Wolf leader Tojuro Hattori declares that the Grey Wolves will reform the world with the Shinra Banshou. The kinjutsushō are key in removing the Shinra Banshou. Kotarou and Hattori declare that they must obtain all five kinjutsushō before the other does. Tobari claims Kotarou's methods cause too many casualties, but Kotarou says that Tobari is too naïve and kind and believes Tobari is trying to something beyond his capability: fight a war without harming anyone. In Banten, Yoite asks Miharu to change the past so he was never born. When Miharu starts to refuse, Yoite tells Miharu that Kira left fragments of Yoite's ki in Tobari, Raimei, and Kouichi. When Yoite dies, they will also die. If Miharu does not change the past, Yoite will leave the fragments in Miharu's friends. Because the Kira technique drains the user's life with every use, Yoite does not have long to live. Miharu agrees to help Yoite and Yoite promises to make Miharu Nabari's king.
3	October 18, 2005	978-4-7575-1561-1	March 23, 2010	978-0-7595-3065-2
010.5. "Taking Shelter from the Rain" (雨宿り, "Amayadori"); 011. "Indecipherable Heart" (読めない心, "Yome Nai Kokoro"); 012. "Unveiled Heart" (見透かされた心, "Misukasareta Kokoro"); 013. "Scholar's Heart" (心読む者の心, "Kokoro Yomu Mono no Kokoro"); 014. "Enlightened Heart" (决する心, "Ketsu Suru Kokoro"); 015. "Ambition" (野心, "Yashin")
Yae Oda, leader of Togakushi ninja village, and her assistant Sōrō Katō ask Banten Village to assassinate someone in exchange for Togakushi's kinjutsushō. The kinjutsushō, the Iduna Shingan, allows the user to see the hearts of others. At a conference, Tobari finds an opening to kill the target. However, Kazuhiko Yukimi, Yoite's caretaker, and Yoite take Miharu hostage and stop him. Miharu and Tobari escape to pursue the target to where Oda is waiting. Oda, who blames the target's assistant for her daughter's death, plans to exact revenge by killing the target. To counterattack Yoite, Oda uses the Iduna Shingan to read his heart.
4	April 27, 2006	978-4-7575-1677-9	July 13, 2010	978-0-7595-3087-4
016. "The Heart..." (心は、..., "Kokoro wa..."); 017. "Transmitted Heart" (伝わる心, "Tsutawaru Kokoro"); 018. "Tuning" (調律, "Chōritsu"); 019. "Prelude" (前奏曲, "Zensōkyoku"); 020. "Polka "Raimei and Raikō" 1" (ポルカ「雷鳴と雷光」①, "Poruka "Raimei to Raikō" 1"); 021. "Polka "Raimei and Raikō" 2" (ポルカ「雷鳴と雷光」②, "Poruka "Raimei to Raikō" 2")
Although Oda has control of Yoite's secrets and attempts to blackmail him into retreating, Yoite's mind is too unstable and he attacks indiscriminately. Yoite refuses to listen to orders, but immediately stops after injuring Miharu. Kouichi kills the target and hypnotizes the target's assistant into taking the blame. Afterward, Kotarou takes the Iduna Shingan, revealing Katō to be a Fuuma Village spy. Oda banishes Katō from Togakushi Village. Oda, unwilling to hurt Katō and others again, promises to stop using the Iduna Shingan. Raimei confronts her brother Raikō Shimizu and attempts to punish him for massacring their clan. She blames the deaths of the clan members on Raikō's greed. He claims that Raimei misunderstood the situation. Defeating Raimei, Raikō takes her sword. Meanwhile, Miharu suspects Tobari remembers the forgotten details of the Shinra Banshou's last use. When Tobari learns of Yoite's wish, Tobari declares he will kill Miharu if he uses the Shinra Banshou. Outside, Hanabusa Seki, a woman living with Tobari, finds Yoite unconscious.
5	October 27, 2006	978-4-7575-1768-4	November 16, 2010	978-0-7595-3112-3
022. "Polka "Raimei and Raikō" 3" (ポルカ「雷鳴と雷光」③, "Poruka "Raimei to Raikō" 3"); 023. "Polka "Raimei and Raikō" 4" (ポルカ「雷鳴と雷光」④, "Poruka "Raimei to Raikō" 4"); 024. "Polka "Raimei and Raikō" 5" (ポルカ「雷鳴と雷光」⑤, "Poruka "Raimei to Raikō" 5"); 025. "Polka "Raimei and Raikō" 6" (ポルカ「雷鳴と雷光」⑥, "Poruka "Raimei to Raikō" 6"); 026. "Curtain Call" (カーテンコール, "Kāten Kōru"); 027. "Will (trip)" (意志 (trip), "Ishi (trip)")
Raikō's assistant Gau Meguro searches for Raimei to tell her the truth about the Shimizu clan's massacre. Ten years ago, members of the clan plotted a coup d'état. When the clan's head refused to step down, she and her husband were accidentally killed. Upon her last request, Raikō kills the leader of the coup. However, the coup had already turned into a riot. As Raimei loved the Shimizu clan, Raikō took the blame to protect her. After learning the truth, Raimei reconciles with Raikō. However, Raikō must be punished for betraying the clan. Gau steps between Raikō and Raimei and takes a blow. Gau becomes comatose, causing Raikō to abandon the Shimizu clan and his sword. A few days later, Miharu joins the Grey Wolves for Yoite. Although Raimei knows about this, she believes Yoite will not disturb the balance between Nabari and those unaware of Nabari. She agrees to locate Banten Village's kinjutsushō Engetsurin.
6	April 27, 2007	978-4-7575-2007-3	March 29, 2011	978-0-7595-3128-4
028. "Intention (weep)" (意思 (weep), "Ishi (weep)"); 029. "Move (syrup)" (移徙 (syrup), "Ishi (syrup)"); 030. "Hereafter (step)" (以次 (step), "Ishi (step)"); 031. "Chair (sharp)" (椅子 (sharp), "Ishi (sharp)"); 032. "Strange Thinking (turnup)" (異思 (turnup), "Ishi (turnup)")
Yoite, Miharu, Yukimi, and Raikō depart for the Kōga ninja village to steal the kinjutsushō Daya, a panacea that uses the brains of ninja children. In Banten, Tobari and Kouichi are approached by Kotarou, Raimei, and Jūji Minami, a Fuuma Village medical ninja. They learn they have been invited to Kōga Village. Meanwhile, Shijima Kurookano, a young Kōga Village ninja, escorts the Grey Wolves into Kōga's Alya Academy. Since the headmaster has fallen ill, the student council president Subaru has taken control of the academy. While the visiting ninja sleep, the Alya students attempt to kill them. Although they fail, they are able to scatter the ninja and trap them in the school. Shijima and Surabu attack Yoite, Miharu, Raimei and Jūji. Yoite is poisoned and goes into hiding with Miharu. Miharu decides that if he cannot obtain Daya to help Yoite, he will use the Shinra Banshou. However, the Shinra Banshou's spirit is not responding to Miharu's calls.
7	October 27, 2007	978-4-7575-2128-5	July 21, 2011	978-0-316-07312-7
033. "Healing Intention (trap)" (医志 (trap), "Ishi (trap)"); 034. "Shoot (drip) (射し (drip)", "Ishi (drip)"); 035. "Intimidate...Death (sheep)" (威...死 (sheep), "I...Shi (sheep)"); 036. "Consider, Think (scrap)" (惟、思 (scrap), "I, Shi (scrap)"); 037. "Stone (help) (石 (help)", "Ishi (help)"); 038. "Dying Wish (flap)" (遺志 (flap), "Ishi (flap)")
Raimei and Jūji are drugged so their brains can be used to create Daya and save the headmaster. Yoite and Miharu are surrounded by the student council. Yoite begs Miharu to help him as he does not want to die. Miharu calls on the Shinra Banshou's spirit, but she does not answer. Miharu is captured and the Shinra Banshou's spirit comments that Miharu is wavering in his decision to save Yoite. Upstairs, a teacher takes Kouichi hostage and has him open the door to the basement. the teacher, Yukimi and Raikō go downstairs. Meanwhile, the teacher shoots Kouichi and kills him. Downstairs, Miharu forcibly activates the Shinra Banshou. The Shinra Banshou's spirit allows Miharu to use her power to fulfill Yoite's wish; instead Miharu saves Yoite's life. A student council member betrays Subaru and traps everyone in the basement as it fills with gas. As the student council member prepares to kill the headmaster, Kouichi attacks him. The student council member is unable to kill Kouichi and commits suicide. Kouichi releases the ninja from the basement. When Subaru realizes the headmaster is close to death, she demands he give her Daya. He tells her he has already given it to someone he trusts. After the headmaster dies, Shijima gives Daya to Miharu.
8	March 27, 2008	978-4-7575-2248-0	November 22, 2011	978-0-316-07313-4
039. "Tears and Scar" (涙とキズアト, "Namida to Kizuato"); 040. "Dream of Immortality" (不死の見る夢, "Fushi no Miru Yume"); 041. "Good-bye, Tobari" (さようならば、帷先生, "Sayōnaraba, Tobari Sensei"); 042. "It is Voice of the God of Death that Calls Me" (僕を呼ぶのは、死神の声, "Boku o Yobu no wa, Shinigami no Koe"); 043. "I Think that I Will Go Search for the Time that Yoite Has Certainly Lived" (宵風の 確かに生きてきた時間を捜しに行こうと思う, "Yoite no Tashika ni Ikitekita Jikan o Sagashi ni Ikō to Omou")
Miharu begins to believe that it is unfair Yoite has to be erased. Yukimi receives a call telling him to kill the Tobari, Aizawa, and Raimei. Meanwhile, Kouichi tells Tobari and Raimei that he and Shijima are immortal. Kouichi and Shijima want Miharu to make them mortal. Afterward, Tobari looks for the best way to protect Engetsurin and decides to disappear. Yukimi tries to enlist Raikō's help in locating Tobari. Raikō refuses as he is still upset over Gau's coma. Yoite suggests Raikō he should use Daya to help Gau. Raikō refuses and Yoite renders him unconscious. When Raikō regains consciousness, he finds that Gau was awakened by Yoite's Kira. When Yukimi reports Tobari's disappearance, Hattori thinks about taking Miharu and Yoite in. As Raikō and Gau begin to search for Tobari, Gau asks Raikō to help Yoite. Elsewhere, Ichiki, Hattori's assistant, orders the government organization Kasa to eliminate Kouichi and Raimei.
9	August 18, 2008	978-4-7575-2366-1	February 28, 2012	978-0-316-20480-4
044. "Thus, the String Was Cut" (かくして 糸は切られた, "Kakushite Ito wa Kira Reta"); 045. "Kotodama" (コトダマ); 046. "The Time I Found You" (見つけた時間の君, "Mitsuketa Jikan no Kimi"); 047. "Let Us Have Good Dreams" (いざや楽しき夢を見ん, "Izaya Tanoshiki Yume o Min")
While recalling his first observations of Yoite, Yukimi sets off to learn more about the boy's past. In a bloody sweater he gets from Kazuho Amatatsu, his sister and Yoite's physician, he finds a card. Yukimi receives a list of Hattori's past appearances from Gau and asks him to take care of Yoite. Meanwhile, Hattori tries to convince Miharu that it is meaningless to grant Yoite's wish. Yoite comes to Miharu's aid and the two run away. Hattori orders Kasa to find Miharu and kill Yoite. Raikō and Gau learn that Miharu and Yoite have run away. Raikō agrees to check if Yukimi is a traitor. Using the information Gau gave him, Yukimi finds the half-brother of Sora, Yoite's discarded name. When Yukimi returns to Iga, Raikō attempts to convince him to abandon Yoite. Yukimi refuses and runs as Raikō vows to kill him. While Yoite and Miharu travel toward Banten, Yoite admits he lied about leaving fragments of his ki in Tobari, Kouichi, and Raimei. Miharu tells Yoite he cannot use the Shinra Banshou because he is confused. He wants Yoite to live.
10	December 27, 2008	978-4-7575-2453-8	May 29, 2012	978-0-316-20481-1
048. "Welcome Home, Children" (おかえり、こどもたち, "Okaeri, Kodomo Tachi"); 049. "The Bird Leaves the Sky" (鳥発つそら, "Tori Tatsu Sora"); 050. "Yoite" (宵風); 051. "Brats Like These" (ガキってのは, "Gakitte no wa")
Raikō begins to wonder if what he is doing is right and tells Yukimi that Miharu and Yoite are heading toward Banten. Raikō and Gau decide to find a way to help Yoite without leaving the Grey Wolves. In Banten, Miharu is kidnapped by Kasa. Hattori once again tries to persuade Miharu to abandon Yoite. However, Miharu refuses, as he and Yoite are "the same". Hattori, however, disproves this. When Raikō tries to convince Hattori to let Yoite live, Hattori states Raikō is abandoning his mission and can be replaced. As Yoite approaches the Grey Wolves' hideout, Raikō and Gau help Miharu escape. Yoite asks Yukimi to protect Miharu. Soon after escaping, Yoite tells Miharu he must continue living. Soon after, Yoite dies. Miharu uses the Shinra Banshou, but the Shinra Banshou's spirit tells him he is too late. One month later, Miharu cannot remember why he used the Shinra Banshou. He learns Yukimi and Kazuho defected from the Grey Wolves to help him. When visiting Yukimi, Miharu starts to remember he erased someone. As Yukimi remembers he forgot about someone, the erasure was not properly done. Miharu believes this is because he was not emotionally strong enough to do it.
11	June 27, 2009	978-4-7575-2600-6	August 21, 2012	978-0-316-20482-8
052. "The Dangerous Thread that Has Become a Bundle" (束なる危うい糸, "Taba Naru Ayaui Ito"); 053. "Idiot!!" (ばかやろっ!!, "Bakayaro!!"); 054. "Lost Memory, Lost Shape" (うしなったきおく、うしなったかたち, "Ushinatta Kioku, Ushinatta Katachi"); 055. "You are My Assistant From Now On" (今からお前はオレの助手だ, "Ima Karao Mae wa Ore no Joshu da"); 056. "Taking Shelter from the Snow" (雪宿り, "Yukiyadori"); 057. "Conviction into that Palm" (その掌に信念を, "Sono Tenohira ni Shinnen o")
12	December 26, 2009	978-4-7575-2767-6	November 20, 2012	978-0-316-20483-5
058. "Promise that Cannot Be Kept" (守れない約束, "Mamore Nai Yakusoku"); 059. "To the Place that Memories Return 1" (想いの帰るところへ①, "Omoi no Kaeru Tokorohe 1"); 060. "To the Place that Memories Return 2" (想いの帰るところへ②, "Omoi no Kaeru Tokorohe 2"); 061. "To the Place that Memories Return 3" (想いの帰るところへ③, "Omoi no Kaeru Tokorohe 3"); 062. "To the Place that Memories Return 4" (想いの帰るところへ④, "Omoi no Kaeru Tokorohe 4"); 063. "To the Place that Memories Return 5" (想いの帰るところへ⑤, "Omoi no Kaeru Tokorohe 5")
13	June 26, 2010	978-4-7575-2919-9	February 26, 2013	978-0-316-20485-9
064. "To the Place that Memories Return 6" (想いの帰るところへ⑥, "Omoi no Kaeru Tokorohe 6"); 065. "To the Place that Memories Return 7" (想いの帰るところへ⑦, "Omoi no Kaeru Tokorohe 7"); 066. "To the Place that Memories Return―――Tobari" (想いの帰るところへ―――帷, "Omoi no Kaeru Tokorohe―――Tobari"); 067. "To the Place that Memories Return―――Hattori and Ichiki" (想いの帰るところへ―――服部と一季, "Omoi no Kaeru Tokorohe―――Hattori to Ichiki"); 068. "To the Place that Memories Return―――Miharu and Asahi" (想いの帰るところへ―――壬晴と旭日, "Omoi no Kaeru Tokorohe―――Miharu to Asahi")
14	January 27, 2011	978-4-7575-2919-9	June 25, 2013	978-0-316-20486-6
069. "To the Place that Memories Return―――Kotarou Fuuma" (想いの帰るところへ―――風魔小太郎, "Omoi no Kaeru Tokorohe―――Fuuma Kotarou"); 070. "To the Place that Memories Return―――Hakutaku" (想いの帰るところへ―――白澤, "Omoi no Kaeru Tokorohe―――Hakutaku"); 071. "To you, Farewell" (あなたに、お別れを, "Anata ni, Owakare wo"); 072. "To you, Welcome Home" (君に、おかえりを, "Kimi ni, Okaeri wo")

== See also ==
- List of Nabari no Ou episodes
- List of Nabari no Ou characters
