= List of Nabari no Ou episodes =

The cover of the first DVD compilation released by Geneon Entertainment on July 25, 2008

The episodes of the 2008 Japanese anime series Nabari no Ou (隠の王; lit. King of Nabari) are directed by Kunihisa Sugishima and animated by J.C.Staff. The anime is an adaptation of Yuhki Kamatani's Nabari no Ou manga, which was first serialized in the Japanese shōnen manga magazine Monthly GFantasy in 2004. The story revolves around Rokujo Miharu, a 14-year-old student who unknowingly possesses a powerful hijutsu within him, and his introduction into the hidden ninja world of Nabari upon his power's activation.

It first began airing on Japan's terrestrial television network TV Tokyo on April 6, 2008; airing on Sundays from 01:30 to 02:00 (JST). It also aired on other Japanese networks such as TV Aichi and TV Osaka, though it aired first on TV Tokyo. It contains a total of twenty-six episodes.

On August 19, 2008, Funimation, on the behalf of d-rights, sent cease and desist orders to the fansub groups who were subtitling the series, to prevent copyright infringement. On December 25, 2008, Funimation announced they licensed the series for an English language release.

Three pieces of theme music are used for the episodes: one opening theme and two ending themes. The opening theme is "Crawl", performed and arranged by Veltpunch, with the lyrics and composition by Hidenori Naganuma. The ending theme up to the sixteenth episode is "Hikari" by Elisa, with lyrics by Emi Nishida. From the sixteenth episode to the end, "Aru ga Mama" (あるがまま, "As It Is") by Anamu & Maki is used. Veltpunch and Elisa released the singles for "Crawl" and "Hikari" on May 21, 2008, and Anamu & Maki released the single for "Aru ga Mama" on September 3, 2008.

Nine DVD compilations of the series, all containing three episodes except for the first compilation (two episodes), have been released by Geneon Entertainment between July 25, 2008, and March 25, 2009. Funimation released the English language adaption of the anime series in two DVD sets. The first was released on September 22, 2009, and the second on November 24 of the same year.

== Episode list ==
| No. | Title | Directed by | Written by | Original release date |
|---|---|---|---|---|
| 1 | "The Awakened One"; Transliteration: "Mezameru Mono" (Japanese: 目醒めるもの) | Tsuyoshi Yoshimoto | Michiko Yokote | April 6, 2008 |
Miharu Rokujou is a fourteen-year-old student who wishes to stay apathetic to everything. He is constantly pestered by his classmate Kouichi Aizawa and teacher Tobari Durandal Kumohira to join their nindō club. When Tobari explains that Miharu is being targeted by ninja, Miharu does not take him seriously. Later, Miharu is attacked by ninja who wish to obtain a hijutsu from him. Miharu hears a voice telling him to fight back, causing plants to attack the ninja. The voice tells Miharu that he should tell her his desires as the Shinra Banshou exists to give him everything. Tobari knocks Miharu out. Tobari tells Miharu that the hijutsu, the Shinra Banshou, is the ultimate weapon created a long time ago and has fused with Miharu's body. Miharu asks Tobari to remove it, but Tobari says that if it could be done, it would have been done already. The Kairoushuu, the ninja village that created the hijutsu, wants the hijutsu and is the most dangerous threat to Miharu's life. Tobari tells Miharu he has to become the ruler of Nabari and pledges his life and honor to Miharu. This has little effect on Miharu's decision to not get involved. Elsewhere, Tojuro Hattori, the leader of the Kairoushuu, announces to his followers that the hijutsu's location has been discovered after ten years.
| 2 | "Raimei Arrives"; Transliteration: "Raimei, Kuru" (Japanese: 雷鳴、来る) | Masahito Otani | Michiko Yokote | April 13, 2008 |
Raimei Shimizu, a samurai from the Fuuma Village, has come to test the possessor of Shinra Banshou. She quickly finds that Miharu is not at all what she expected. She becomes concerned about entrusting the power to do anything to Miharu and expresses her concern to Tobari. She tells Tobari that she will kill Miharu if she joins the Kairoushuu. Later in the day, she learns that Miharu is not irresponsible, care-free, or has a heart of stone; Miharu does not want to hurt others. She learns that Tobari is looking for a way to seal the hijutsu. She convinces Tobari and Kouichi to take Miharu to Fuuma Village and ask Kotarou Fuuma, the leader of Fuuma Village and the authority on ninjutsu, his advice on sealing the hijutsu. As the four approach Fuuma Village, Raimei realizes that something is wrong and finds that Fuuma Village has been attacked.
| 3 | "Surprise Attack"; Transliteration: "Shūgeki" (Japanese: 襲撃) | Kei Umabiki | Michiko Yokote | April 20, 2008 |
The Fuuma Village is attacked by ninjas from the Kairoushuu clan, who are after the Tenpenka, the kinjutsushō of the Fuuma Village. Yoite overpowers Miharu, Tobari, Kouichi, and Raimei using Kira the kinjutsushō of the Iga Village, before Kotarou returns to the Fuuma Village.
| 4 | "Duty Declared"; Transliteration: "Ninmu Iiwatashi" (Japanese: 任務言渡) | Mana Uchiyama | Michiko Yokote | April 27, 2008 |
Yoite leaves the Fuuma Village, and the Kairoushuu clan has possession of the Tenpenka. Kotarou devises a plan for the Banten clan to steal the kinjutsushō from the other villages, as Tojuro devises a plan for the Kairoushuu clan to do the same.
| 5 | "Greed"; Transliteration: "Yoku" (Japanese: 慾) | Shigeru Ueda | Miharu Hirami | May 4, 2008 |
Miharu, Kouichi, and Raimei leave Tobari and Kotarou to seek and destroy the Engetsurin, the kinjutsushō of the Banten Village, but to no avail. Yamase, a teacher a part of the Kairoushuu clan, asks Miharu to change his past concerning the Kairoshi clan using the Shinra Banshou, but he is ambushed by Kouichi and Raimei. She asks Yamase about her brother Raiko, who killed their clan and joined the Kairoushuu. Meanwhile, Kotarou tests the extent of Tobari's ninjutsu, only to prove a point. Yoite appears in the presence of Miharu, knocking Kouichi and Raimei unconscious.
| 6 | "Choices"; Transliteration: "Sentaku" (Japanese: 選択) | Kazuhiro Hoshino | Miharu Hirami | May 11, 2008 |
Yoite takes Miharu and tells him to change the past so he never existed. Yamase arrives to intercept but is attacked by Yoite. After witnessing Yamase, Miharu is presented with three choices. One is to have the Shinra Banshou removed from him, another is to have him use it for his own desires, and the last is to help Yoite. Yoite states that he would kill Tobari, Kouichi, and Raimei if Miharu does not grant Yoite's wish. He decides to help him, and is taken home, greeted by Tobari, Kouichi, and Raimei. Yoite asks Kazuhiko Yukimi, his caretaker and squad leader of the Kairoushuu clan, whether or not he is alive.
| 7 | "A Mind Made Up"; Transliteration: "Kessuru Kokoro" (Japanese: 決する心) | Kaoru Yabana | Michiko Yokote | May 18, 2008 |
The Banten clan is approached by Yae Oda, president of the Fog Blue Corporation and leader of the Togakushi Village. By offering the Izuna Shingan, the kinjutsushō of the Togakushi Village, as reward and using the very technique to hold their secrets hostage, she asks them to assassinate a man for her, Mr. Frosty. Meanwhile, Raimei heads back to the Fuuma Village to see what has found out about Raiko.
| 8 | "A Mind Passed Along"; Transliteration: "Tsutawaru Kokoro" (Japanese: 伝わる心) | Tsuyoshi Yoshimoto | Michiko Yokote | May 25, 2008 |
Yukimi and Yoite step in with Miharu hostage, preventing the attempted assassination. The target flees to the parking lot, where Yae vows revenge on Nowake. After the other four arrive, Yoite is driven into using the Kira carelessly. Fearing for his friends' lives, Miharu stops him. Kouichi completes the mission and hypnotizes Nowake, who takes the blame. Kato, the subordinate of Yae, is revealed as a Fuuma clan spy, thereby exiled from the Togakushi Village. Yae, swearing never to use the Izuna Shingan again, leaves.
| 9 | "Prelude"; Transliteration: "Zensōkyoku" (Japanese: 前奏曲) | Masahito Otani | Kiyoko Yoshimura | June 1, 2008 |
A murder brings Raimei closer to finding Raiko. Kouichi is dispatched to stop Raimei from doing anything drastic. Miharu stays with Tobari while his grandma is away. Meanwhile, the Kairoushuu clan gathers. Yoite begins to show signs of his life force leaking due to the use of Kira. He quickly leaves to find Miharu. Miharu asks Tobari about the secrets he is unwilling to tell and reveals he will use the Shinra Banshou to help Yoite. Hanabusa Seki, a paleontologist, finds Yoite unconscious near Tobari's house. Raimei arrives at a garden where Raiko attacks her.
| 10 | "Polka – Raimei and Raiko"; Transliteration: "Poruka·Raimei to Raikō" (Japanese: ポルカ·雷鳴と雷光) | Mana Uchiyama | Kiyoko Yoshimura | June 8, 2008 |
Raimei and Raiko confront each other. However, Raiko fatally wounds Raimei, taking her sword, Kurogamon, with him. Yoite is found by Hanabusa, who happens to room with Tobari. She brings him home and treats him kindly, but the feeling is not reciprocated. Later, Yoite asks Miharu to bring him the Engetsurin kinjutsushō and the Izuna Shingan kinjutsushō, saying that he still holds his friends' lives hostage. Raiko struggles as he reminisces about Raimei.
| 11 | "Curtain Call"; Transliteration: "Kāten Kōru" (Japanese: カーテンコール) | Kei Umabiki | Kiyoko Yoshimura | June 15, 2008 |
Raimei, released from the hospital, wants to retrieve Kurogamon. The Banten clan encounters Gau Meguro, an assistant of Raiko and a member of the Kairoushuu clan. At Raimei's home, he tells her the truth about the day Raiko killed the Shimizu clan. Raimei returns to the site of their fight and, after seeing Raiko there, demands Kurogamon back. During the ensuing battle, Raiko, about to finish Raimei off, accidentally slashes Gau, who jumped between them. Later, the siblings are seen in the hospital where Gau is being treated. Raiko returns his sword, Shirogamon, back to the garden.
| 12 | "Determination"; Transliteration: "Ishi" (Japanese: 意思) | Kazuhiro Hoshino | Michiko Yokote | June 22, 2008 |
When Miharu goes to visit Gau, Raimei tells him that Tobari told her about his promise to Yoite and says she'll help him. Miharu meets up with Yoite and retrieves the Izura Shingan kinjutsushō. He later announces to the Kairoushuu clan that he is joining them and gives them the scroll. Meanwhile, the Banten clan, as well as the Kairoushuu clan, receives an invitation to an academy located in the Kouga Village. Miharu, Raiko, Yukimi, and Yoite set off toward it.
| 13 | "The Schoolhouse That Never Sleeps"; Transliteration: "Nemuranu Manabiya" (Japanese: 眠らぬ学舎) | Kaoru Yabana | Kiyoko Yoshimura | June 29, 2008 |
Representatives of the Kairoushuu and the Banten clans reach the Alya Academy located in the Kouga Village to discuss the future of the world of Nabari and are welcomed by the students of the academy since the leader of the village is on his deathbed. Secretly, everyone is just after the Daya, the kinjutsushō of the Kouga Village. Tobari is unable to understand why Miharu has defected to the Kairoushuu clan. The students of the academy attack the Kairoushuu and the Banten ninja at night.
| 14 | "The Depths of the Night"; Transliteration: "Yoru no Soko" (Japanese: 夜の底) | Shigeru Ueda | Kiyoko Yoshimura | July 6, 2008 |
Miharu and Yoite run from the academy students as Yoite is injured. Kannuki, the vice principal of the Alya Academy, who is also trying to get the Daya, shoots Kouichi. It is revealed that the Daya is capable of curing anyone, however it requires the flesh of young ninjas as its ingredients. Meanwhile, Yoite is stabbed by Shijima Kurookano, an academy student, and the Shinra Banshou awakens.
| 15 | "A Morning of Partings"; Transliteration: "Wakare no Asa" (Japanese: 別れの朝) | Kazunobu Shimizu | Kiyoko Yoshimura | July 13, 2008 |
Miharu tries to save Yoite, but Thobari does not approve of his using the Shinra Banshou and knocks him unconscious. Kouichi, seemingly immortal, rescues everyone. Before dying, Sirius, the principal of the Alya Academy and the leader of the Kouga Village, entrusts the Daya to Shijima, who, in turn, gives it to Miharu.
| 16 | "A Visitor From Afar"; Transliteration: "Enrai no Kyaku" (Japanese: 遠来の客) | Kōsuke Kobayashi | Miharu Hirami | July 20, 2008 |
Kouichi reveals his immortality to Tobari and Raimei. It is revealed that Hattori does not need Yoite if he outlives his usefulness. Miharu and Yoite visit Hanabusa to discover the location of the Engetsurin. Tobari does not return at night and Yukimi visits Hanabusa unexpectedly.
| 17 | "Moment of Collapse"; Transliteration: "Kekkai no Toki" (Japanese: 決壊の時) | Masahito Otani | Miharu Hirami | July 27, 2008 |
Yukimi visits Hanabusa to search for Tobari. Upon finding she does not know anything, he eventually leaves. The next day, Raimei visits Kouichi, telling him she is helping Miharu obtain the Engetsurin. The pair are suddenly attacked by Yukimi. To prevent Yukimi from finding Tobari, Raimei leads him to the school. Unfortunately, Tobari is there. Tobari attacks both ninja, but Yoite stops Yukimi from fighting back. After a while, Yukimi decides to retreat and Yoite develops a high fever and is found to have discoloration and scars on his hands. Tobari then disappears completely. Hattori suspects Yoite and Miharu will rebel and moves on to the next step. Yoite and Miharu leave Hanabusa's home.
| 18 | "A Voice Calling Out"; Transliteration: "Yobu Koe" (Japanese: 呼ぶ声) | Kei Umabiki | Kiyoko Yoshimura | August 3, 2008 |
Yoite's health is failing and he ends up in a hospital. He overhears the doctor telling Miharu that he has about a month to live. Scared, Yoite leaves the hospital, but not before using Kira on Gau, who was still in a coma. Gau recovers due to the effect of Kira. Miharu catches up with Yoite, who is remembering his past.
| 19 | "Profile of an Angel of Death"; Transliteration: "Shinigami no Yokogao" (Japanese: 死神の横顔) | Kaoru Yabana | Kiyoko Yoshimura | August 10, 2008 |
Gau wants to repay Yoite for having saved his life. Yukimi recalls how he met Yoite. Miharu and Yoite head out to the Togakushi Village to meet Yae so they can figure out a way to use the Shinra Banshou without the Engetsurin. The characters of the Tattegami, the secret intelligent unit of Kairoushuu, are introduced.
| 20 | "Toward Togakushi"; Transliteration: "Togakushi e" (Japanese: 戸隠へ) | Masao Higuchi | Kiyoko Yoshimura | August 17, 2008 |
Tobari recalls how he was entrusted with Miharu ten years ago. Miharu and Yoite meet Yae, and Miharu convinces her to use the Izura Shingan to confront the Shinra Banshou. Shinra Banshou tells Yae and Miharu's inner self that she is not granting the wish to save Yoite because it is a boring wish and also not Miharu's own wish. Meanwhile, the Tattegami destroys the Fog Blue Corporation, which was the headquarters of the Togakushi Village, as well as reaches Yae's house to retrieve Miharu.
| 21 | "Ambition"; Transliteration: "Yabō" (Japanese: 野望) | Shigeru Ueda | Miharu Hirami | August 24, 2008 |
Off in a room somewhere, Yoite wakes up to find himself bound and drugged, but is unaware of where he is. Back at the Kairoushuu hotel, Ichiki, the leader of the Tattegami, tells Hattori how Yae continues to ask about the annihilation of the Togakushi clan, but still will not answer their questions despite all the ninja techniques and medication they've used on her. Hattori decides to confront Yae to get her cooperation. Meanwhile, Raiko and Gau help Miharu and Yoite escape from the Tattegami.
| 22 | "Chaos"; Transliteration: "Konton" (Japanese: 混沌) | Makoto Hoshino | Miharu Hirami; Michiko Yokote | August 31, 2008 |
Behind the scenes, Kotarou plans a rescue for Yae along with his subordinates. Kato personally infiltrates the Kairoushuu hotel and finds Yae however discovered by Raiko. Raiko lets them both escape and he confronts Hattori, hoping to cover up and explain the situation. Meanwhile, Miharu and Yoite are found by Yukimi. They encounter the Tattegami, in which they began their attack. Kouichi and Raimei arrives with Gau to counterattack.
| 23 | "Activation"; Transliteration: "Hatsudō" (Japanese: 発動) | Tsuyoshi Yoshimoto | Michiko Yokote | September 7, 2008 |
Having brought Yoite and Miharu to Hattori, Yukimi uses the excuse of making the two repent to cover what he did. While Hattori explains how he convinced Yoite to learn the Kira, Raiko finds Ichiki, but before he can do anything he is attacked by Shiranui, the squad leader of the Tattegami. Elsewhere, Kouichi, Raimei, and Gau are attacked by the Kairoushuu ninja. Raiko injures Shiranui, and attempts to attack Yukimi. However, Hattori kills Raiko. Raimei and Gau leave Kouichi to fight off the Kairoushuu ninja, only to find out that Raiko is dead.
| 24 | "Engetsurin"; Transliteration: "Engetsurin" (Japanese: 円月輪) | Kei Umabiki | Michiko Yokote | September 14, 2008 |
After seeing Raiko's body, Raimei and Gau try to attack Hattori, but are easily defeated. Hattori then blames everything on Miharu, who begins to believe it is actually his fault. Acting on his desires, the Shinra Banshou begins to awaken, much to Hattori's and Ichiki's glee. As Tobari uses the Engetsurin, the past is revealed regarding how Miharu possessed the Shinra Banshou. Hattori explains that he wants to possess the Shinra Banshou. Tobari attacks him, but is easily defeated. Yoite, on the other hand, drove himself to kill Hattori.
| 25 | "Two"; Transliteration: "Futari" (Japanese: 二人) | Masahito Otani | Michiko Yokote | September 21, 2008 |
After killing Hattori, Yoite goes into a state of insanity and destroys Hattori's body with his Kira. Meanwhile the Shinra Banshou convinces Miharu to use her powers which results in him growing many times his normal size. Right as things are looking grim, Asahi, Miharu's deceased mother, appears before Miharu in his mind and asks him to suppress the Shinra Banshou. Many days later, Miharu wakes up in a hospital bed safe and sound, only to find out that Yoite has gone missing. Miharu sets out to find, with Tobari's guidance, and ends up at a chapel.
| 26 | "Heart to Heart"; Transliteration: "Kokoro Tsumuide" (Japanese: 心紡いで) | Shigeru Ueda | Michiko Yokote | September 28, 2008 |
Feeling responsible for everything that has happened, Yoite no longer desires to be erased and has chosen to die alone. Miharu however claims that everything is his fault and explains that he wanted to help Yoite disappear if that is what Yoite really wanted. After hearing how everyone sees him as an invaluable friend though, Yoite decides to live out his remaining days, so that he does not waste the sentiments that everyone has shown him. Everyone continues on, content with their lives. Yoite simply feels grateful that he met Miharu. Back at Tobari and Hanabusa's house later on, Miharu and Yoite are waiting for everyone to come by to visit. Miharu then steps away for a bit to get some drinks and comes back to find Yoite's body dissolving into the air. Miharu vows to never forget him.
