= AnimeSuki =

Torrent index and forum website

- Website type: Anime torrent index
- Available in: English
- Owner: GHDpro
- Creator: GHDpro
- Website: www.animesuki.com
- Commercial: No
- Launched: December 26, 2002; 23 years ago
- Current status: Active

AnimeSuki (from Japanese anime and suki (好き; "like" or "love")) is a website and once considered "... the largest database of BitTorrent anime shows" that focused on providing unlicensed anime fansubs using the BitTorrent peer-to-peer system. The website was created by GHDpro on December 26, 2002. Animesuki was not a tracker; instead, it provided links to many trackers across the web. It did not list pornography or series that had been licensed in North America. However, in 2013 it stopped maintaining its database of torrents, and the forums remain as the only active part of the site.

== Legal status ==
The site only linked to anime that had not been licensed by any American companies. Once a title was licensed, the corresponding fansub links were removed from the site and the series was listed on its licensed list. Nonetheless, although none of the files were hosted on the site itself, AnimeSuki could be held accountable for violating copyright law, as linking to sites that themselves infringe on the law has been considered a form of contributory infringement in the United States (Intellectual Reserve v. Utah Lighthouse Ministry).

Though fansubs are technically copyright violations, AnimeSuki's legal page alleges that the WTO TRIPS Agreement specifies that the distribution of copyrighted material is only necessarily illegal when done on a commercial scale, thus making it difficult for anyone besides the copyright holder to prosecute fansubbers. To date, only one Japanese company, Media Factory, has requested its content removed from the site. However, Funimation and Kadokawa Pictures USA have also sent them separate cease and desist letters concerning several titles, which were promptly removed. In Singapore, Odex has targeted AnimeSuki's users with legal action.

AnimeSuki was also known for erring on the side of caution regarding licenses. Even though some series such as Hanaukyo Maids were not initially licensed, AnimeSuki kept them from being listed because of the likelihood that Geneon would secure the rights to it.

== Present ==
Over time, AnimeSuki experienced a decline in new fansub entries, due to various changes in online anime distribution, such as preference to download episodes directly from translators' websites, competition with other database websites, frequent updates, and disbandment of translation groups. Fan translations have further declined, as more anime became licensed and professionally translated for official release worldwide. And since the growing popularity of video streaming websites such as Crunchyroll, HIDIVE, Amazon Prime Video and Netflix, which provide licensed anime and can stream to smartphones, AnimeSuki has ceased all updates and activity.

As of February 15, 2019, the main website is closed. However, as of 2026, the discussion boards remain active.

== See also ==
- Comparison of BitTorrent sites
