= Trade association =

Organization for businesses in a given industry

A trade association, also known as an industry trade group, business association, sector association, industry consortium or industry body, is an organization founded and funded by businesses that operate in a specific industry. Through collaboration between companies within a sector, a trade association coordinates public relations activities such as advertising, education, publishing and, especially, lobbying and political action. Associations may offer other services, such as producing conferences, setting industry standards, industry self-regulation, holding networking or charitable events, or offering classes or educational materials. Many associations are non-profit organizations governed by bylaws and directed by officers who are also members.

Trade associations and other industry groups are politically influential in the United States, United Kingdom, and other countries, lobbying elected officials, regulators, and other policymakers. They also invest heavily in publishing, advertising, and other forms of issue advocacy.

== Political influence ==
One of the primary purposes of trade groups, particularly in the United States, is to attempt to influence public policy in a direction favorable to the group's members. It can take the form of contributions to the campaigns of political candidates and parties through political action committees (PACs); contributions to "issue" campaigns not tied to a candidate or party; and lobbying legislators to support or oppose particular legislation. In addition, trade groups attempt to influence the activities of regulatory bodies.

In the U.S., direct contributions by PACs to candidates are required to be disclosed to the Federal Election Commission or state and local election overseers; are considered public information; and have registration requirements for lobbyists (lobbyist for the FEC). Even so, it can be difficult to trace the funding for issue and non-electoral campaigns.

Trade associations and other industry groups are also politically influential in the United Kingdom, including pro-business lobbying on trade and other issues.

Trade association lobbying is common across the European Union (EU). Between February 2024 and February 2025, the 162 largest corporations and trade associations collectively spent €343 million on lobbying EU legislators and officials. In Slovenia, the government's approach to consulting business associations has been noted by the European Commission as a good practice example.

== Publishing ==
Trade associations are heavily involved in publishing activities in print and online. The main media published by trade associations are as follows:

- Association website: The association's corporate website typically explains the association's aims and objectives, promotes the association's products and services, explains the benefits of membership to prospective members, and promotes members' businesses (for example, by means of an online listing of members and description of their businesses).
- Members newsletters or magazines: Whether produced in print or online, association newsletters and magazines contain news about the activities of the association, industry news and editorial features on topical issues. Some are exclusively distributed to members, while others are used to lobby lawmakers and regulators, and some are used to promote members' businesses to potential new customers.
- Printed membership directories and yearbooks: Larger trade associations publish membership directories and yearbooks to promote their association to opinion formers, lawmakers, regulators and other stakeholders. Such publications also help to promote members' businesses both to each other and to a wider audience.

Examples of trade associations that publish a comprehensive range of media include the European Wind Energy Association (EWEA), Association of British Travel Agents (ABTA) and the Confederation of British Industry (CBI).

== Generic advertising ==
Industry trade groups sometimes produce advertisements, just as normal corporations do. However, whereas typical advertisements are for a specific corporate product, such as a specific brand of cheese or toilet paper, industry trade groups advertisements generally are targeted to promote the views of an entire industry.

=== Ads to improve industry image ===
These ads mention only the industry's products as a whole, painting them in a positive light in order to have the public form positive associations with that industry and its products. For example, in the US the advertising campaign "Beef. It's what's for dinner" is used by the National Cattlemen's Beef Association to promote a positive image of beef in the public consciousness.

=== Ads to shape opinion on a specific issue ===
These are adverts targeted at specific issues. For example, in the US in the early 2000s the Motion Picture Association of America (MPAA) began running advertisements before films that advocate against movie piracy over the Internet.

== Controversy ==
Trade associations have faced frequent criticism due to allegations that they operate not as profit-making organizations, but rather as fronts for cartels involved in anti-competitive practices and price fixing. Critics contend that these associations engage in activities such as price-fixing, the creation and maintenance of barriers to entry in the industry, and other subtle self-serving actions that are detrimental to the public interest. These criticisms raise concerns about the true nature and intentions of trade associations, questioning their commitment to fair competition and the welfare of the broader economy.

=== Anti-competitive activity ===
Jon Leibowitz, a commissioner at the Federal Trade Commission in the United States, outlined the potentially anti-competitive nature of some trade association activity in a speech to the American Bar Association in Washington, DC, in March 2005 called "The Good, the Bad and the Ugly: Trade Associations and Antitrust". For instance, he said that under the guise of "standard setting", trade associations representing the established players in an industry can set rules that make it harder for new companies to enter a market.

=== Cartels ===
In September 2007, the German trade association for Fachverband Verbindungs- und Befestigungstechnik (VBT) and five fastener companies were fined 303 million euros by the European Commission for operating cartels in the markets for fasteners and attaching machines in Europe and worldwide. In one of the cartels, the YKK Group, Coats plc, the Prym group, the Scovill group, A. Raymond, and Berning & Söhne "agreed [...] on coordinated price increases in annual 'price rounds' with respect to 'other fasteners' and their attaching machines, in the framework of work circles organised by VBT".

== Copyright trade groups ==
- IFPI, the International Federation of Phonogram and Videogram Producers, represents the recording industry worldwide, with over 1450 members in 75 countries and affiliated industry associations in 48 countries. The IFPI works in partnership with similar national organizations:
  - Recording Industry Association of America (RIAA) represents the recording industry in the United States
  - ASINCOL, the Colombian Association of Phonograph Producers, Colombian music industry association
  - Music Canada, formerly known as the Canadian Recording Industry Association is the non-profit trade organization representing the largest Canadian companies that create, manufacture and market sound recordings
  - Recording Industry Association of New Zealand (RIANZ), non-profit trade association of producers and artists in New Zealand
  - Mexican Association of Producers of Phonograms and Videograms (AMPROFON)
- Motion Picture Association (MPA) represents the film industry in the United States
- The Association of Japanese Animations (AJA), a group consisting of small to medium-sized intellectual property companies
- Business Software Alliance (BSA) promotes the intellectual property of software developers
- Entertainment Software Association (ESA) promotes the intellectual property of game developers in the United States
- British Phonographic Industry (BPI), UK music industry association. Founded the BRIT Awards, and give Gold, Silver and Platinum disks for UK-based sales
- Federation Against Copyright Theft (FACT) is the main UK anti-copyright infringement organization, mainly for films
- Australian Recording Industry Association (ARIA), oversees the collection, administration and distribution of music licenses and royalties in Australia
- Japanese Society for Rights of Authors, Composers and Publishers (JASRAC)
- Recording Industry Association of Japan (RIAJ)
- Russian Organization for Multimedia and Digital Systems (ROMS) organization on collective management of rights of authors and other rightholders in multimedia, digital networks and visual arts
- Anti Video Piracy Association of Singapore (AVPAS) for anime
- GEMA society for musical performing and mechanical reproduction rights in Germany

== See also ==
- China Council for the Promotion of International Trade
- Commodity checkoff program
- Conestoga Foundrymen's Association
- Guild
- Inter-professional association
- List of food industry trade associations
- Professional association
- Trust (business)
