= Conestoga Foundrymen's Association =

US industry trade group

The Conestoga Foundrymen's Association (CFA) is an Industry Trade Group consisting of member foundries in South Central Pennsylvania and foundry supply companies that service those foundries. CFA's brings together people working in the foundry industry.

== History ==
CFA was founded by H. Nelson Albright, manager of the Columbia Malleable Castings Corporation, John W. Mentzer and Clyde Sanders. The name "Conestoga" was taken from the Conestoga Wagon, which was used by American Pioneers to settle the American West and was invented and built in Lancaster County, PA.

The CFA first met on April 27, 1949. Todd Belfield of Cochran Foundry was the organization's first chairman. Membership reached a high in 1974-75 with 110 sustaining companies and 379 associate members. CFA held regular meetings which focused on educating the people working in member foundries on "how-to" of foundry operations. CFA started its annual golf outing in 1950-51 and still holds this event. Proceeds go toward the CFA's annual scholarship fund. The scholarship is awarded to a student at Penn State who is studying cast metal sciences.

== The CFA Today ==
As of 2011 CFA membership stood at 45 member companies and about 147 associate members. The decline from the 1975 high is due to the decline in the overall number of foundries in South Central Pennsylvania, and in the United States, because of outsourcing of casting production to countries such as Mexico, India and China. The foundry industry continues to consolidate with just over 1,700 foundries nationwide, yet foundry sales in 2023 were projected by the American Foundry Society to exceed $48 billion. CFA meetings provide valuable information to members. The CFA also holds at least two joint meetings every year with local American Foundry Society chapters: The Chesapeake Chapter and The Keystone Chapter.
