= BMG Canada Inc v Doe =

Judgement of the Canadian Federal Court of Appeal

BMG Canada Inc. v. Doe
- Court: Federal Court of Canada, Federal Court of Appeal
- Full case name: BMG Canada Incorporated v. John Doe
- Citation: 2004 FC 488 aff'd 2005 FCA 193

Court membership
- Judges sitting: von Finckenstein J., Federal Court; Richard C.J., Noël and Sexton JJ.A., Court of Appeal

Keywords
- Copyright, Infringement

BMG Canada Inc. v. Doe, 2004 FC 488 aff'd 2005 FCA 193, is an important Canadian copyright law, file-sharing, and privacy case, where both the Federal Court of Canada and the Federal Court of Appeal refused to allow the Canadian Recording Industry Association (CRIA) and several major record labels to obtain the subscriber information of Internet service provider (ISP) customers alleged to have been infringing copyright.

== Background ==
CRIA made an application under the Rules of the Federal Court to compel 5 ISPs (Bell Canada, Rogers Communications, Shaw Communications, Telus, and Vidéotron) to divulge the account information of 29 IP addresses that were believed to have downloaded approximately 1,000 copyrighted music files through the KaZaA and iMesh file-sharing software. Shaw strongly opposed the motion, citing customer privacy and technical difficulties. Telus, Bell and Rogers also expressed varying levels of disagreement, also on privacy grounds. Vidéotron offered no opposition: they chose not to appear at the court hearing, instead stating their support of the CRIA's position and readiness to provide the requested information as soon as a court order was issued.

== Federal Court decision ==
The judgment of the Federal Court was delivered 31 March 2004 in Toronto, Ontario.

Justice von Finckenstein held that the ISP could not be compelled to divulge their user information. To be able to compel the ISPs to divulge personal information that was protected by both PIPEDA and user agreements with the ISPs, von Finckenstein ruled that several conditions must be met:

(1) applicant must establish a prima facie case against the unknown alleged wrongdoer; (2) person from whom discovery is sought must be more than an innocent bystander; (3) that person must be only practical information source; (4) said person must be reasonably compensated for expenses of compliance with the discovery order; and (5) the public interests favouring disclosure must outweigh legitimate privacy concerns.

He noted that there was no evidence that the files being downloaded were illegal. He held that under the Copyright Act, downloading a song for personal use was not illegal. CRIA had only been able show that the users made copies available on their shared drives. CRIA also failed to show that there was no alternative to gain the requested information. Von Finckenstein concluded that the plaintiff was unable to show that the importance of the disclosure outweighed the importance of the right to privacy, and denied the request for discovery.

== Federal Court of Appeal decision ==
The judgment of the Federal Court of Appeal was delivered 19 May 2005, at Toronto, Ontario.

Justice Sexton, for the court, upheld the core finding of the previous case, that the identities should not be revealed to the plaintiffs. He found that merely placing files in a shared directory does not constitute the "authorization" needed to infringe on the distribution right. He modified the test required in this kind of case and also said that, given the preliminary stage of the proceedings, the lower court should not have commented on whether the alleged file-sharing was actually copyright infringement. However, Justice Sexton only held that exceptions to the private right of copying were not considered, not that downloading a song in and of itself was a violation.

== See also ==
- Odex's actions against file-sharing
