= Odex's actions against file-sharing =

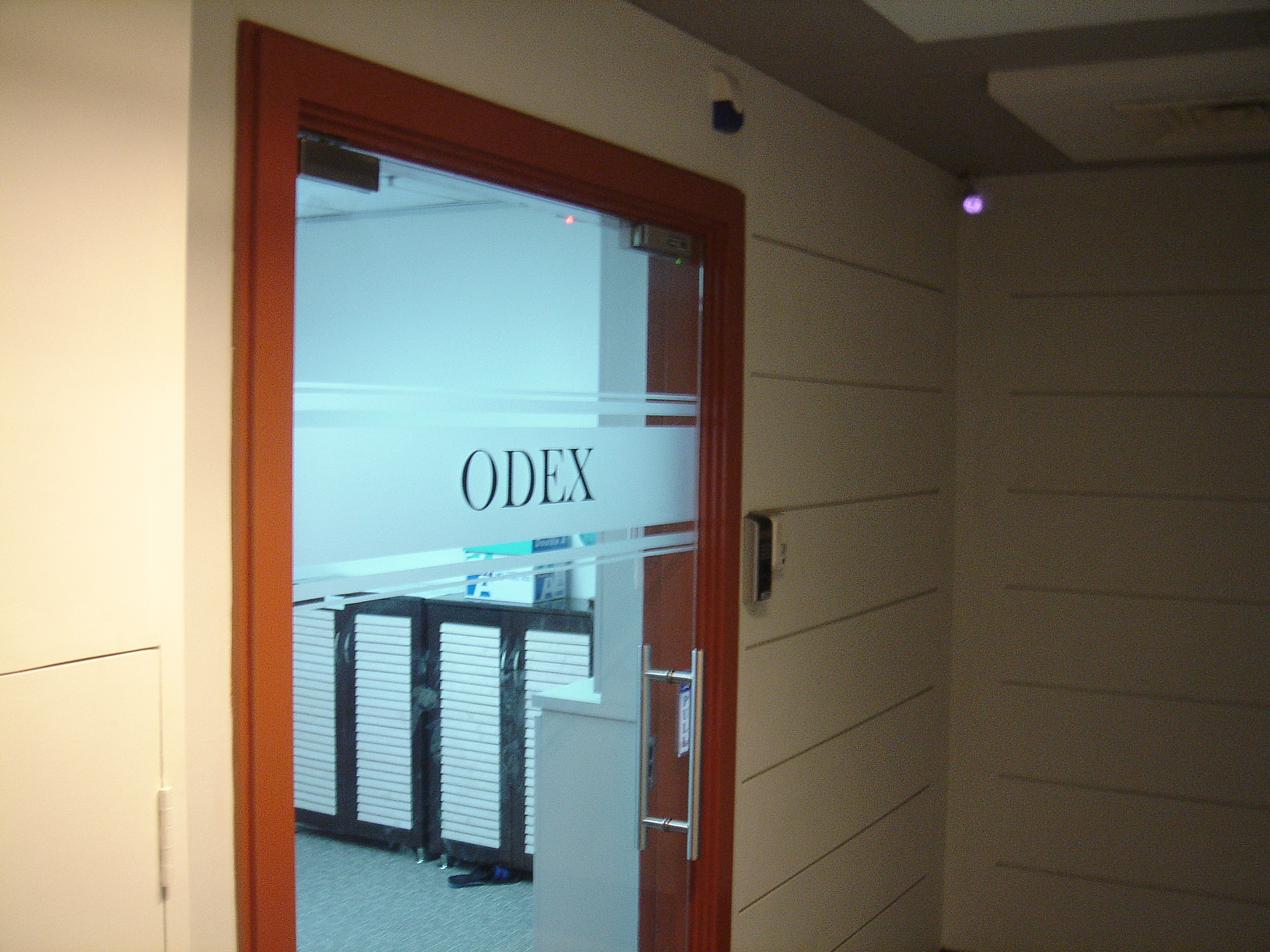
Odex's head office at International Plaza, where the out-of-court settlements to the company by alleged illegal downloaders were made

Between 2007 and 2008, Odex, a Singapore-based anime licencing company, initiated a series of demands and legal actions against internet service providers (ISPs) in Singapore to obtain details of subscribers who they alleged were involved in illegal download activities of content. As the licensor and releaser of Japanese anime for Southeast Asian consumption, the company was appointed by the copyright holders to submit legal documents and court proceedings on their behalf in Singapore.

== Actions ==
Japanese copyright owners appointed Odex to engage BayTSP, an anti-piracy service provider, to track illegal downloading activities of Japanese anime in Singapore, using a method similar to that of the Recording Industry Association of America (RIAA). BayTSP took several months to obtain the IP addresses and evidence of Singaporean illegal downloads, and singled out the website AnimeSuki as a major source, tracking many of its BitTorrent users.

From early 2007 to January 2008, court orders for pre-action discovery with evidence of illegal download activity were issued to various ISPs to request for their subscriber's details. In May 2007, ISP SingNet consented in writing to release details on internet accounts associated with illegal download activity. On 13 August, further documentations were submitted to court, with a court order being issued to ISP StarHub, to reveal the identities of account holders linked to illegal download activities. It was subsequently revealed that Starhub did not disclose account holders' information to Odex as they were reviewing their rights when Odex lost their appeal to Pacific Internet (PacNet).

Japanese copyright owners were represented by law firm Rajah & Tann in the pre-action discovery court procedure to the major ISPs, including its application against PacNet. Odex was the appointed representative of Japanese copyright owners on the legal proceedings and applications to court.

After rulings from the Subordinate Courts of Singapore, letters of demand by Odex were sent to alleged offenders demanding compensation in lieu of legal actions. The recipients were asked to contact Odex within one week and pay settlement fees from S$3,000 to S$5,000 or face legal action. The recipients also had to sign a non-disclosure agreement, promise to destroy all copies of the downloaded anime, and stop downloading the copyrighted material.

Some alleged offenders decided on litigation. The lawsuit ended in 2011 with the Singapore Subordinate court ruling in favour of the copyright owners and penalty being SGD$5,000 per episode damages to be paid to copyright owners for every episode caught for illegal download, totalling SGD$125,000. Interest of SGD$15,095.58 and legal costs of SGD$12,263.76 was also awarded in favour of Japanese copyright owners.

There was speculation from the online community that the company would collect approximately S$15 million from 3,000 individuals from out-of-court settlements, but Odex responded that it did not require each of them to pay a uniform S$5,000. The main factor it considered when deciding the level of compensation to demand was the amount of downloading by each individual. Odex confirmed that more than 3,000 IP addresses had been disclosed as a result of the court orders, but estimated that the amount collected would cover less than 20% of its enforcement costs. The company's director, Peter Go, subsequently revealed that most of the compensation payments had been paid to BayTSP and to ISPs for the retrieval of their subscribers' personal data. He justified his company's actions by stating that, according to BayTSP's statistics, Singapore had one of the highest rates of illegal anime downloads in the world and that Odex wanted to reduce this by 85%.

On 3 September 2007, Odex's director Stephen Sing announced on his company's internet forum that Odex would no longer send letters of demand to Internet users who had stopped their illegal downloading since the beginning of the enforcement drive. Two weeks later, Odex installed an online warning system developed by BayTSP that generated cease and desist emails intended for the alleged downloaders. The company relied on ISPs to forward such emails to their subscribers who engaged in illegal download activity. Sing states that Odex under the instructions of copyright owners would rely on weekly reports generated by BayTSP to continue the anti-piracy drive, and if necessary would resort to legal action if illegal downloading activity escalates.

On 29 January 2008, the High Court handed down its ruling on Odex's appeal that the earlier documentation of Odex as representation of Japanese copyright owners is not sufficient and further documentation of Power of Attorney and Warrant to Act is required. The court upon receiving the additional legal documents from copyright owners ordered Pacific Internet had to release the names of the alleged illegal downloaders details. This ruling does not change Odex's role as Japanese copyright owner's representative to act on their behalf in Singapore.

== Reactions ==
The company's actions attracted national media attention and were harshly criticised by the Singaporean anime community as "sudden and severe". Anime fans were outraged by the issuing of legal threats to children as young as nine years old, as they believed children were unable to differentiate between legal and illegal downloading. There were widespread calls in online blogs and forums to boycott Odex's products.

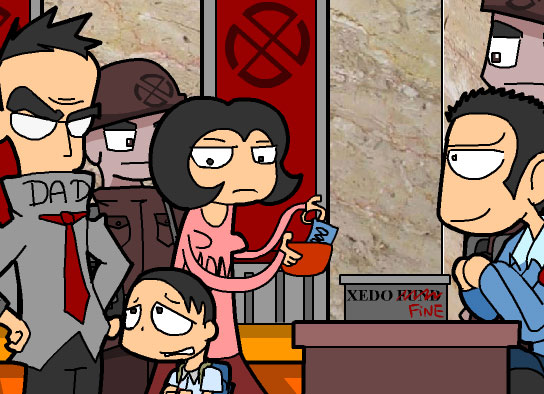
Parents paying out-of-court settlements to Odex for their children's downloading, as depicted in the parody animation Xedo Holocaust circulating on the Internet

Odex blamed the approximate 70% fall in its Video CD (VCD) and Digital Video Disc (DVD) sales in 2006 and 2007 on illegal downloading. The response of anime fans was that the fall in sales was because Odex's products were inferior, inaccurately translated, and released later than the online versions. Odex subsequently attributed the inaccurate subtitling on censorship laws against mature themes (such as yaoi) and on fansubbers—anime fans who had translated the Japanese dialogue—whom they had hired. In response, the Board of Film Censors said that it did not ask for subtitles to be changed, that it merely classified content, and that the onus was on distributors to ensure accurate subtitles. In addition to problems of quality and scheduling, criticisms were directed at Odex's litigious strategy and poor public relations. Odex received support from the Anti Video Piracy Association of Singapore (AVPAS) in making its demands for compensation.

Stephen Sing was mocked and criticised after posting comments to an online forum which many considered to be gloating. Messages posted by Sing under the nickname "xysing" included "Me too busy suing people" [sic] and "Hahahahah! I double-6-ed so many downloaders serve them right!" Sing was labelled the "most hated man in Singapore's anime community" by members of the blogosphere, a wanted poster with his face circulated online, and he was taunted openly in his office. Sing asserted that threats of arson, assault and even death were made against him and filed a police report. Although he expressed regret over the remarks because they were a "PR disaster" and "very wrong", he said that he had written them while feeling frustrated and did not apologise. He dismissed his "double-6-ed" remark, an expression of joy at the threats of lawsuits, as having been made "two months ago", but it was revealed that they had been made only three weeks earlier. A Sunday Times article condemned these online responses as "propaganda" spread by "lynch mobs" and noted that some of these netizens had revealed the home addresses of Odex employees. Odex placed a quarter-page advertisement in The Straits Times on 22 August 2007 to explain its actions.

Odex's website was hacked and defaced on 21 November 2007 and was replaced by an angry message about the legal actions.

Members of an online forum expressed their unhappiness by selling "anti-Odex" T-shirts. Another netizen created a video parody, entitled Xedo Holocaust, and uploaded it to YouTube and other video-sharing websites. A website was established giving details of an "Odex VCD recycling drive", where those who joined could exchange their Odex VCDs for a black awareness ribbon to wear. A protest by a few people with several action figurines took place on 25 August 2007 under intense police scrutiny, which was considered by Western observers to be a rarity in Singapore. An online group, Xedo Defense, was set up to provide support for the downloaders facing legal action. It raised funds to hire a collective lawyer from Infinitus Law Corporation to represent two of the downloaders when suits were filed against them in November 2008 by the anime studios.

There were assertions that Odex had charged 10% interest for settlements paid through an instalment plan, but a press release by the company denied that it had required any such interest payments. By September 2007, 105 out of the 300 SingNet subscribers who had received letters had negotiated with and paid Odex, although, in a news conference, Odex said that it had neither forced payment from nor fined anyone. The company explained that it would not profit from the enforcement process and intended to donate to charity any excess amount received. It would also release a financial audit of all the money collected at the close of proceedings. On 31 August 2007, in an attempt to address criticisms of late releases, Odex began to offer video on demand (VOD) on its relaunched website. Users could legally download and unlock a digital rights management (DRM)-protected anime episode at S$2 for seven days.

In mid-November 2007, the cease-and-desist emails initiated by Odex and BayTSP reached several users in Japan, France, and the United States, some in the form of Digital Millennium Copyright Act (DMCA) notices from their ISPs. Although Odex and BayTSP announced shortly afterwards that the emails were sent out in error, Japanese commentators suggested that the enforcement action was "a step in a right direction". On 21 November 2007, Odex's website was hacked and defaced and the VOD service put out of action. Its main page was replaced by an angry message against the company's legal actions, and experts interviewed by representatives of the local media said that the perpetrator likely was from Singapore.

== Odex v. Pacific Internet ==
=== Subordinate Courts' decision ===
On 16 August 2007, Odex initiated legal action against a third Internet Service Provider, Pacific Internet. Odex sought to have Pacific Internet disclose the personal information of about 1,000 subscribers. The closed-door hearing was held on 23 August 2007 in the Subordinate Courts, where District Judge Earnest Lau ruled that Pacific Internet did not have to reveal its subscribers' personal information. Lau believed that Odex was not the correct party to make the application, despite having permission to prosecute on behalf of the Japanese anime studios. The decision came as a surprise to many, and Odex quickly announced its intent to appeal. Although Lau denied Odex the court order, he warned that the right to privacy was no defence for copyright infringement.

In light of the decision, the ISP StarHub, represented by Drew & Napier, said "[we are] assessing our options, given the different decisions rendered by the court". Meanwhile, it was revealed that SingNet had consented to Odex's application, had not instructed its lawyers to attend the hearing, and the two-week deadline for appealing against the application had passed. SingNet's failure to contest Odex's application, perhaps even expediting it, was perceived by some of its subscribers as a voluntary breach of privacy. SingNet later declared that it neither "gave consent" nor assisted Odex in its application for the release of subscriber information, and that its customer subscriptions remained unaffected.

In a rare move, District Judge Earnest Lau released a 14-page judgment explaining the court's denial of Odex's request for Pacific Internet's client information. He compared Odex's demands to an Anton Piller order, which provides for the right to search premises and seize evidence without prior warning. Seen as draconian, it is only used under extreme circumstances. He held that only copyright holders themselves, or their exclusive licensees, can bring such applications and that he was not satisfied with the evidence harvested by BayTSP for the identification of downloaders. Out of all the anime licensed to Odex, only the license in respect of Mobile Suit Gundam SEED had been granted exclusively to the company. The judge noted that, out of the 13 authorisation letters presented in court, ten of them authorised the Anti Video Piracy Association of Singapore (AVPAS), not Odex, to act for the copyright holders. Odex was ordered to pay Pacific Internet's legal costs of S$7,000.

=== High Court appeal ===
Odex's appeal against the Subordinate Courts' decision began on 3 October 2007 before Justice Woo Bih Li in the High Court. BayTSP's CEO, Mark Ishikawa, and representatives of four Japanese studios, including TV Tokyo, Gonzo and Toei Animation, flew to Singapore to testify on behalf of Odex. Although the Japanese companies intended to file lawsuits themselves should Odex fail, the High Court approved their addition as parties to Odex's appeal.

In his judgment of 29 January 2008, Justice Woo ordered Pacific Internet to release its subscribers' information only to the six Japanese companies that were parties to the case. He explicitly denied Odex access to this information. He upheld District Judge Lau's decision that Odex was not the correct party to have asked for release of subscriber data. As a result, he directed the company to pay Pacific Internet's legal costs of S$20,000. Following the ruling, some downloaders who had already settled with Odex planned a countersuit to recover their settlement monies. The ruling may have set a precedent for online privacy in Singapore by making it more difficult for copyright licensees to take legal action against downloaders.

== Further developments ==
=== Subsequent action by anime studios ===
In early August 2008, seven months after the High Court ruling, Showgate (previously Toshiba Entertainment), Geneon Entertainment, Sunrise, Gonzo and TV Tokyo initiated their own legal actions against downloaders. Like Odex, they were represented by Rajah & Tann and sent out letters of demand for payment to SingNet, StarHub and Pacific Internet subscribers asking users to "enter discussions" with the studios' solicitors within seven days. Showgate, which supported Odex in its appeal against Pacific Internet, consulted Odex before beginning its legal actions. Settlements were reported to range between S$5,000 and S$6,000 per person, and in August 2008, BayTSP was reported to be in contractual talks with other anime studios to track downloaders in Singapore.

Three months later, the anime studios filed a writ of summons with the Subordinate Courts against four "heavy downloaders". The hearing was speculated to begin in 2009 or 2010, with legal fees ranging from S$50,000 to S$80,000. Because of its bearing on downloaders of other media, such as movies and games, the suits were closely watched by the public. In 2010 it was reported that Odex's effort was unsuccessful as it was not the primary copyright holder.

=== Similar actions in Singapore by other media owners ===
In April 2015, the makers of Dallas Buyers Club successfully obtained a court order against two major ISPs Starhub and M1 to reveal customers who have allegedly downloaded illegal copies of the movie. Samuel Seow Law Corporation represented the makers in sending demand letters to more than 500 subscribers asking for a written offer of damages and costs. This is the second reported instance of a major legal action taken by a media company against individuals in Singapore for alleged illegal downloading since Odex.

== Legal opinions and analysis ==
The case was covered extensively by the country's newspapers. In The Straits Times of Singapore, lawyers who were interviewed said anime fans would not have a strong defence against Odex if proof of uploading or downloading of unauthorised videos was presented. In his analysis, Thomas Koshy—a legal academic writing in Today—questioned the legality of Odex's threatening criminal prosecution of downloaders. Koshy maintained that only the Attorney-General had the power to prosecute and that there was no indication that he had authorised Odex to conduct prosecutions on his behalf. Moreover, Koshy opined that it was improper for Odex to have combined its demand for compensation with a threat of criminal prosecution; although Odex's letters alleged "illegal downloading activity", the company threatened punishment associated with the more serious offence of distributing materials which infringed copyrights. Koshy noted that Odex had cited a legal provision intended to regulate people's file sharing for monetary gain rather than downloading by a casual consumer. Burton Ong, an associate professor at the National University of Singapore Faculty of Law, suggested that an anime fan who downloaded a few episodes may have been able to rely on "fair dealing" as a defence against the charge of copyright infringement. One of the criteria for pursuing this line of defence would have been proving that the download subsequently boosted, rather than undermined, the commercial viability of the anime industry.

Anime fans and sympathisers used the Internet to raise funds and lodge a legal challenge to Odex's methods; one Internet user created an invitation-only forum for those considering going to court against Odex over its allegations of illegal downloads. Fans solicited legal advice and put together a library of relevant material. A letter to The Straits Times pointed out that downloaders deciding to settle out of court with Odex were afforded no protection from lawsuits initiated by other companies within the anime industry.

Following District Judge Earnest Lau's ruling in the Odex v. Pacific Internet lawsuit, Koshy expressed his belief that SingNet might be in breach of the spirit of the Telecommunications Competition Code, which protects the confidentiality of subscribers' information and prohibits unauthorised release. Another lawyer interviewed by ZDNet, however, did not think that SingNet's actions were improper, and a spokesman for the Infocomm Development Authority announced that SingNet was found to be in compliance with the code. Andy Ho, another The Straits Times editor, expressed concern that private entities might use intellectual property laws invasively, thus precipitating a chilling effect on free speech; he called for privacy laws to be quickly enacted.

== See also ==
- BMG Canada Inc. v. John Doe
- Legal issues with BitTorrent
- Trade group efforts against file sharing
