= Anti Video Piracy Association of Singapore =

Anti Video Piracy Association of Singapore (AVPAS) is a copy protection consortium with other anime producers founded by Odex on 30 July 2003. The association lists over 400 titles (as of 25 May 2007) and is supported by at least one governmental agency. It aims to monitor and combat the unauthorized distribution of video related rights, in particular anime and Japanese-related Intellectual Property. The website is maintained by NetroAsia. Its main committee members are Dr. Toh See Kiat (AVPAS president), Go Wei Ho Peter (AVPAS vice president and Odex director), Sing Xin Yang (AVPAS secretary and Odex director) and Yong Yet Yuen (AVPAS Secretary).

The organisation, along with Odex, gained considerable prominence in 2007 due to Odex's legal actions against Internet users in Singapore, which were ultimately rejected by the Court in January 2008.

== Efforts in tackling video infringement in Singapore ==
Up to date, the AVPAS is known to have created a website which features the Odex Clarification Article on their homepage, has images of bootlegged anime and Japanese video CDs and contains a list of authorised titles.

According to the "Odex Clarification Article" on the AVPAS website, the AVPAS has also been said to have authorised Odex to carry out demands of money from anime downloaders.
