= Fansub =

Practice of fans adding translation subtitles to media that has none

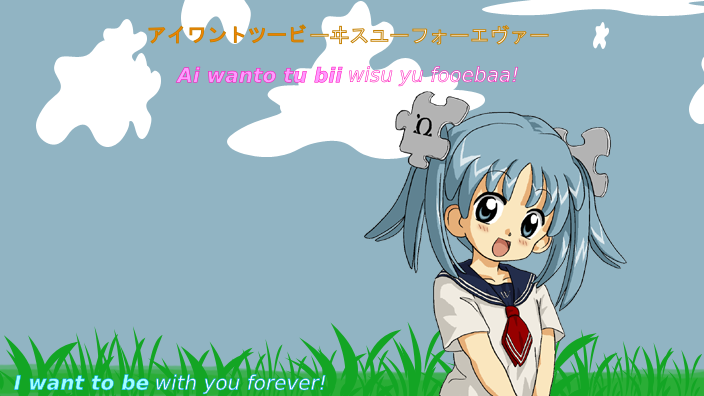
Example of karaoke typical in anime fansubs

A fansub (short for fan-subtitled) is a version of a foreign film or foreign television program, typically anime or dorama which has been translated by fans (as opposed to an officially licensed translation done by paid professionals) and subtitled into a language usually other than that of the original.

== Process ==
The practice of making fansubs is called fansubbing and is done by a fansubber. Fansubbers typically form groups to divide the work. The first distribution media of fansubbed material was VHS and Betamax tapes.

Early fansubs were produced using analog video editing equipment. They would copy the anime (often from laserdiscs) onto VHS, translate the dialogue, and painstakingly time and format the subtitles for the video. Popular tools for this included JACOsub (Amiga) and Substation Alpha (Windows). The next step was to produce one or more masters, a high-quality copy of the finished fansub from which many distribution copies could be made. The fansubber would playback the raw video through a computer equipped with a genlock in order to generate the subtitles and then overlay them on the raw signal. The hardware most often used was an Amiga computer, as most professional genlocks were prohibitively expensive. The final output of the arrangement was then recorded. The master was most often recorded onto S-VHS tape in an attempt to maximize quality, though some fansubbers used the less expensive VHS or Beta. Once it was completed, the master copy was sent to a distributor.

=== Digisubs ===
The internet allows for highly collaborative fansubbing, and each member of a fansub team may only complete one task. Online fansubbing communities such as DameDesuYo are able to release a fully subtitled episode (including elaborate karaoke with translation, kana, and kanji for songs, as well as additional remarks and translations of signs) within 24 hours of an episode's debut in Japan.

The production of a fansub typically begins with obtaining the unsubtitled source video called a "raw" that typically comes from DVDs, VHS tapes, television broadcasts, peer-to-peer networks, and directly from Japanese-based contacts. Then, a translator watches the video and produces a time-stamped text file of the screenplay with any relevant notes. The same series or episode may be subtitled by multiple groups with independent translations of varying quality. Fansub groups sometimes translate other already translated fansubs that are more susceptible to errors. Translated text is assigned with start and end times in a process known as timing to ensure subtitles appear when dialogue is spoken and disappear with the silence. An editor and a translation-checker read over the script to ensure that the English is natural and coherent while still retaining the original meaning. A typesetter then designs for dialogue, signs, translator notes, etc. Then groups perform quality control to catch any final errors.

Encoders then take the script file and create a single subtitled video file, often aiming for a target file size or video quality. "Hard" subtitles, or hard subs, are encoded into the footage, and thus become hard to remove from the video without losing video quality. "Soft" subtitles, or soft subs, are subtitles applied at playback time from a subtitle datafile, either mixed directly into the video file (.mkv, .ogm, etc.), or in a separate file (.ssa, .srt, etc.). Soft subs can also be rendered at higher resolutions, which can make for easier reading if the viewer is upscaling the file, but also are more difficult to blend into the video (for instance rotated text/moving text). Hard subs have traditionally been more popular than softsubs, due to a lack of player support and worries over plagiarism, but most fansub groups now release a softsub version of their releases.

The resulting fansub is a digital video file and can be distributed via CD, DVD, DDL, P2P software, and by file-sharing bots on IRC and also FTP. The distribution is usually handled by a distribution team, or "distro" team, composed of one or more individuals with a server or very high upload speed.

== History ==
=== Pre-fansubs (pre–1970s) ===
The first documented Japanese animation to be distributed in the United States was The Tale of the White Serpent airing on March 15, 1961. Until the late 1970s, Japanese community TV stations' broadcasts were aimed exclusive at very young children. Soon after the release video cassette recorders in November 1975, post-Astro Boy anime began to spread throughout the United States. By March 1976, TV stations in the United States began broadcasting super robot shows such as Getter Robo, and due to the availability of VCRs, fans could record these shows to show to their friends. Fred Patten describes his first exposure to anime at the Los Angeles Science Fiction Society (LASFS) in 1976 when he met up with another fan who was an early adopter of Sony's betamax technology. By May 1977 he and a group of fans founded the first anime club in the United States, the Cartoon/Fantasy Organization (C/FO).

In November 1977, the C/FO began corresponding with other Japanese animation fans across the country and because the distribution of shows across the United States was different based on location, fans began trading tapes of shows they were missing between each other. At the time many LASFS members maintained contact with members around the world, and thus C/FO members began exchanging videos with fans located in Japan, typically US military personnel, who wanted Star Trek and Battlestar Galactica. Fortunately, shows from either the United States or Japan could be played in either region as both used the NTSC format for broadcast. These shows were not translated; however, Japanese animations remained simple enough that the average viewer could discern the plot exclusively from the visuals. By 1979, fans and clubs of Japanese animation had begun to separate from the science fiction movement and began to refer to the media they watched as anime.

Throughout this period it was considered socially acceptable to screen anime for an audience without the publisher's consent, as few companies had American offices, and the few that did would invariably refuse to grant permission. Japanese companies made it apparent that they knew fans in the United States engaged in unauthorized distribution and screening, but also knew that fans were not profiting. Japanese companies asked fans to help them publicize; for instance, Toei Animation asked the C/FO to aid it with some marketing research at San Diego Comic-Con. Starting in 1978, Japanese companies tried to set up their own American divisions; however, with the exception of the film The Sea Prince and the Fire Child which was licensed to RCA/Columbia Pictures Home Video, they realized they were not going to succeed in the American market and the last American anime company branch closed in 1982.

=== Growth of anime fanclubs (1980s) ===
After anime companies pulled out of the United States in 1982, there were no longer any legal or moral forces to discourage fans from copying and distributing tapes among themselves. From the late 1970s until the late 1980s, clubs began expanding to have chapters in other cities and grew to become of national and international scales. As the fandom grew, fans begun to experience ideological conflicts such as whether to keep the fandom niche or not. The visual quality of tapes began to degrade as fans made copies of copies; by the early 1980s some C/FO members reported tapes in their 15th to 20th generation that were extremely poor quality. In the mid to late 1980s, fans began to make booklets containing the translated dialogue for entire films (typically $2–3 to cover costs) and anime-focused magazines.

Despite numerous attempts, any efforts to convince US companies to license Japanese animation failed, with the exception of a handful of companies that were intent on "carving up" series to rewrite them into children's cartoons. Sean Leonard states that entertainment executives at the time mistakenly believed that anime were, like Western cartoons, predominantly aimed at young children; furthermore, Japanese animated dramas and such were much too violent and complex in plot for children. Leonard states that the most notorious example was the translation of Warriors of the Wind, released in the US in 1985, which left its creators Hayao Miyazaki and Isao Takahata appalled; Takahata exclaimed that licensing Nausicaä was a huge error and that no further Studio Ghibli produced films would be licensed internationally. These edits however were no worse than most other non-Disney animation films that were available in the US. Fans who obtained the Japanese originals of Nausicaä were inspired to organize an anime tour to Tokyo in 1986 to see Miyazaki's Laputa: Castle in the Sky and landmarks in anime.

Carl Macek played a key role in expanding the North American anime fandom. Macek ran a comic book and movie memorabilia specialty shop. After assisting in marketing and promotion of Heavy Metal and the recent establishment of a nearby C/FO chapter, he began researching Japanese animation and imported Japanese cels, becoming known as a Japanese animation specialist. Harmony Gold, who had acquired international licenses for several series and planned to distribute them in Latin America, Europe, and the US, reached out to Macek and enlisted his help for the US market. After noticing Harmony Gold's selection of Macross and similar science fiction series, Macek obtained Harmony Gold's approval to edit three anime series together into a single unified series named Robotech. Macek went to science fiction conventions to promote the series and discovered a growing cult following among adolescents and young adults, in contrast to his initial assumption that the series could be exclusively targeted toward children. Macek edited Macross, Southern Cross, and Genesis Climber MOSPEADA together into Robotech, which became a major commercial success and earned him significant recognition within the fanbase. Leonard describes Robotech as being more faithful to the original series than any other commercially successful North American anime release in its era, noting that Robotech included key elements such as the first love triangle on both Japanese and American animated television.

The C/FO was at its height between 1985 and 1989, with over three dozen chapters throughout the US. John Renault helped lead the C/FO chapter in Japan and played a key role throughout fansub history due to his Japanese fluency, anime industry contacts, and military background. Renault helped exchange raws from Japan, wrote informative articles about production, translated booklets, introduced military techniques to anime distribution, and provided plot synopses that proved invaluable for watching Japan-exclusive anime. Fan distribution through C/FO's efforts, particularly C/FO Rising Sun, sought to keep anime free (but controlled within the C/FO organization) in order to promote Japanese animation. Bootlegging at the time was economically infeasible; accordingly, access to anime in North America was heavily dependent on one's contacts within anime fan communities, leading to a growing divide in fandom between the "haves" and "have-nots". In 1989 members began to accuse Patten of disloyalty for writing articles for general magazines rather than the perpetually behind-schedule C/FO fanzine. However, Patten felt that, by writing for popular magazines, he was furthering their cause to proselytize and promote anime. After Patten stepped down with no clear successor, the C/FO began to break apart, and eventually ceased to exist as a conglomerate in July 1989.

=== Early fansubs (1980s) ===
The first known fansub documented at the Rising Sun chapter of the C/FO was in 1986 of a Lupin III episode produced on the Amiga, marking the introduction of the formula for the process of fansubbing. However, fansubbing was extremely expensive at this time (on the order of $4000 in 1986 and over one hundred hours). There were a few ventures into subtitling in the late 1980s; Leonard labels the fansub of the first two episodes of Ranma ½ in May 1989 as the earliest widely distributed fansub.

=== Distribution and playback (1990s, early 2000s) ===
In the late 1990s and early 2000s, fansubs were primarily distributed through physical means like VHS or Beta tapes and mailed CD-Rs. Many fans did not have high-speed Internet and were unable to download large files. Many of the early digital fansubs were made from regular tape subs. In the mid-2000s, most fansubs were distributed through IRC channels, file hosting services and BitTorrent. In recent years, most fansub groups have moved from IRC to BitTorrent distribution. Dedicated anime trackers make finding the latest releases easy, while groups often have their own websites for release updates. File size standards are less strict due to the lack of CD-R and DVD-R reliance.

== Legal and ethical issues ==
Hye-Kyung Lee, a lecturer at King's College London, states that anime fansubbers embody the general characteristics of fans described by John Fiske: fansubbers are motivated by a strong affection for anime, devotion to sharing it with other fans, a sense of community interaction with their viewers, a desire to work collaboratively in a group, and a strong desire to support the local animation industry by promoting anime culture and widening anime's accessibility. Lee describes fansubbers as involved in productive activities that enhance their knowledge of anime, improve their skills, and develop a final product. The goal of the first anime club, Cartoon Fantasy Organization, and its subsequent chapters was to proselytize and promote anime. Sean Leonard and Lee agree that without fan distribution that began in the 1970s and 1980s, the anime industry would not take off as it did in the 1990s. Some companies such as Protoculture Addicts with its titular magazine and Viz Media with Animerica drew their origins from anime club fanzines in the early history of fansubs.

Lee describes an unspoken rule in the early fan community: "once the anime was licensed the fansubbed version should no longer be circulated". As a result, many fansubbers do not view themselves as pirates. Sean Leonard distinguishes fansubs from bootlegs in this period, arguing that fansubs followed that unspoken rule, whereas bootlegs aimed to make a profit. Many fansubs began to include a "This is a free fansub: not for sale, rent, or auction" disclaimer as a response to bootleggers, and would encourage viewers to buy official copies. As fansubbing was so expensive in the 1980s, and official Western releases of anime were rare and often poor-quality, bootlegging tended to be financially infeasible during this period.

Early fansubs would often have markedly worse visual quality than official releases, as the VHS tapes of fansubs would deteriorate from repeated copying; this reduced the level of competition between fansubs and official releases. During the 1980s, US publishers typically found fansubbing useful for testing demand and broadening their fanbase, whereas Japanese publishers treated fansubbing as remote and insignificant. Lee states that some Japanese producers even praised fansubbers' efforts at promoting their work overseas. However, ongoing technological advancement complicated that relationship. As subtitling became more affordable in the 1990s, both fansubbing and official Western releases of anime enjoyed an upswing. Further advances in the twenty-first century made each step of the fansubbing process easier and cheaper, and the visual standards of fansubs improved dramatically.

These technological developments were also coupled with shifts in how fansubs were produced and distributed. Fansubs began to be shared mostly online, first on IRC and then over BitTorrent. The move to the Internet also enabled the globalization of the fansubbing community; although English remained the dominant language among fansubbers, the consumption of fansubs expanded worldwide. This globalization was one factor in fansubbers moving away from their earlier aim of not competing against the official releases: because anime might only be licensed to certain international markets, some fansubbers argue that they would be abandoning the rest of the world if they stopped circulating fansubs of series that received official US releases. Fansubbers have also continued to subtitle and release shows owned by companies that significantly edit the shows they own, such as 4Kids. (Note: 4Kids attempted an uncut re-release of their shows Shaman King and Yu-Gi-Oh in the 2000s, but 4Kids CEO Alfred Kahn stated that their sales fell short of the company's expectations, and so their production was discontinued.) The change in fansubbers' attitudes may also derive from shifts in the attitudes of their consumers: fans began to demand greater immediacy in the digital era, and the lower barrier of entry facilitated the emergence of casual fans who were less willing to purchase and collect DVDs.

The anime industry's views on fansubbing hardened as fansubs became more widespread. The 1993 Anime Expo was the first time when US industry representatives publicly discussed the ways in which pre-existing copies were eating into profits. In the 2000s, US companies have gone farther, and directly blamed fansubbers for the decline in DVD sales. Representatives of companies such as Geneon and ADV Films have publicly criticized fansubs. Japanese copyright holders have also begun to take action against fansubs. The Japanese copyright society JASRAC began requesting takedowns against YouTube-based fansubs during the 2000s, and groups such as Media Factory and Nippon TV have requested that their works be removed from download sites.

Some figures from the anime industry still maintain a positive view of fansubs. For instance, Steve Kleckner of Tokyopop described fansubs as "flattering [rather than] threatening", and stated that fansubs provided publishers with a means to identify what media their customer base might want to see.

Intellectual property lawyer Jordan Hatcher situates fansubs on the boundary between the desirable doujinshi fan culture and the "massive online file trading so vilified by the recording and motion picture industries". Legal scholar Lawrence Lessig states that the re-working of culture—remix—is necessary for cultural growth, and points to doujinshi in Japan as an example of how permitting remixes can contribute to a vibrant cultural industry. However, Hatcher states that fansubs are not analogous to this type of remix because their aim is to remain faithful to the original. Furthermore, Hatcher states that fansubs compete with the original cultural product since they have the potential to replace the market need for official translations, thus creating a similar situation to the debate over peer-to-peer file trading. Conversely, Henry Jenkins has argued that fansubbing has a positive impact on the anime industry through its function as publicity.

Hatcher states that copyright law does not condone fansubs. The Berne Convention, an international copyright treaty, states that its signatories—including Japan—grant authors exclusive right to translation. Hatcher states that fansubs could "potentially" be legal within Japan given the nature of Japan's domestic copyright laws, although the target audience of fansubs is the non-Japanese market. However, Hatcher notes that copyright law in the United States—the frame of reference for most online discussions of fansub legality—construes translations as derivative, and holds that fansubs infringe on the author's right to prepare derivative works and to reproduction by copying original source material.

== Legal action ==
In 1999, Ryuta Shiiki, a former representative of SPE Visual Works Inc. sent a letter to a fansub distribution group to take down the illegal copies of the anime Rurouni Kenshin, because a company that was interested in the rights of said series notified the Japanese company about the illegal distribution of it. The group complied and the series was pulled from distribution. This is the first legal action via a cease-and-desist letter against a fansub in the United States.

In 2002, Hideaki Hatta, president of Kyoto Animation, sent a letter to a fansub group requesting the stop of illegal distribution of the anime OVA Munto. The fansub group complied and the distribution stopped. This was the first legal action via a cease-and-desist letter against the fansubbing of an anime title not available outside Japan. However, it was later confirmed that Central Park Media licensed the title in the United States.

In 2003, a fansubbing group known as Anime Junkies was involved in a conflict with Urban Vision, the licensor and co-producer of the Ninja Scroll TV series. Urban Vision sent a letter asking for Anime Junkies to stop hosting the licensed material, but Anime Junkies did not comply with the request and responded negatively to Urban Vision. Christopher Macdonald, an editor at Anime News Network, highlighted the ethics code of the fansubbing community and asked that fans not support Anime Junkies as a result of their actions.

On December 7, 2004, a Tokyo law firm representing Media Factory sent letters and e-mails to the anime BitTorrent directory AnimeSuki and fansub groups Lunar Anime and Wannabe Fansubs requesting that they halt the fansubbing and hosting of all current and future fansubbing productions. AnimeSuki and Lunar Anime complied, and shortly after, other fansub groups such as Solar and Shining Fansubs followed suit. Despite the request, Wannabe Fansubs and a handful of other fansubbing groups continued to produce fansubs of MFI anime series.

On July 27, 2006, the legal department representing the Spanish anime company Selecta Visión sent a cease-and-desist letter to the anime BitTorrent and fansubbing site Frozen-Layer requesting the halt of the fansubbing and publishing all of current and prior anime licensed by the company. The owner complied and, until 2013, established that all licensed anime in Spain was banned from the site, regardless of the status of the license.

In Singapore, anime distributor Odex has been actively tracking down and sending legal threats against internet users in Singapore since 2007. These users have allegedly downloaded fansubbed anime via the BitTorrent protocol. Court orders on Internet service providers to reveal subscribers' personal information have been ruled in Odex's favour, leading to several downloaders receiving letters of legal threat from Odex and subsequently pursuing out-of-court settlements for at least S$3,000 (US$2,000) per person, the youngest person being only nine years old. These actions were considered controversial by the local anime community and have attracted criticisms towards the company, as they are seen by fans as heavy-handed.

On May 18, 2007, Anime News Network reported that the police in Poland and Germany seized the fansubbing site Napisy.org arrested at least 9 people related to it. These raids were orchestrated by the Polish Society of the Phonographic Industry (ZPAV), a collective rights organisation, and German authorities shut the site which was hosted on servers in that jurisdiction. In May 2013, that case was closed, as prosecutors decided to drop the charges due to the charged individuals' ignorance of the unlawfulness of their actions. The site Napisy.org is currently closed and it shows sites to watch legal content.

On May 19, 2007, the Spanish organization Federación Anti Piratería (FAP) sent a cease-and-desist against the website Wikisubtitles.net and their website provider Bluehost, requesting the closure of the site since the owners were profiting with the content of others, violating copyright laws. The webmaster complied and the site was closed. However, the webmaster published the source-code of the website. Since then, websites like Addic7ed, Subtitulos.es and Wikisubs appeared using the Wikisubtitles source code.

On July 9, 2013, the Swedish copyright enforcement agency Intrångsundersökning seized the servers for Swedish and English website Undertexter.se, a website that contained fansub scripts of several movies and series. On 2016, the owner of the website, Eugen Archy was prosecuted of violating the Swedish Copyright Act and was found guilty of copyright violation and the Attunda District Court sentenced him to probation. In addition, he has to pay 217,000 Swedish kronor ($27,000), which will be taken from the advertising and donation revenues he collected through the site.

On September 21, 2016, the Kyoto Prefectural Police in Japan arrested two Chinese company workers, Liang Wang and Wangyi Yang, on Wednesday on suspicion of violating the Japanese Copyright Act by uploading the anime series The Heroic Legend of Arslan: Dust Storm Dance and Fate/kaleid liner Prisma Illya Drei!! with Chinese subtitles. Both suspects admitted to the charge, and Yang claimed to be a member of a Chinese fansubbing group. This became the first known legal action against fansubbing in Japan.

On October 27, 2016, the Kyoto Prefectural Police arrested two Chinese individuals on charges of violating the Japanese Copyright Act. The two suspects were both located in Tokyo. The first suspect is a 29-year-old male living in Edogawa ward. The second suspect is a 23-year-old male college student. According to police, the first suspect is accused of fansubbing episodes of the anime Saki: The Nationals in Chinese and uploading the subtitled episodes on a file sharing service. The second suspect allegedly subtitled a different anime in Chinese, and similarly used a file sharing service, but the report did not mention the anime.

On February 16, 2017, the Kyoto Prefectural Police arrested a 26-year-old Chinese man on the charge of illegally subtitle the anime Ange Vierge in Chinese and distribute it through a file sharing software. Police allege that the man is a member of the group Jimaku Gumi (sic).

On April 22, 2017, a judge in Amsterdam, Netherlands, declared fansubtitling illegal. The Dutch court declared that these translations correspond to the producers and no one else. In case they do not exist, they can not be created by fans. After this ruling, the creation of subtitles without the consent of the author of an audiovisual production is now considered a crime in the Netherlands. This is the first ruling in the world that values subtitles as intellectual property and that punishes with fines and imprisonment those who violate copyright laws.

On January 31, 2018, Sankei West and Asahi Shimbun reported that police departments from Kyoto, Yamaguchi, Shizuoka, Mie, and Shimane Prefectures in Japan, along with the Association of Copyright for Computer Software arrested four Chinese nationals for illegally fansubbing anime, manga and videogames. The suspects, who range in age from 23 to 28, are allegedly part of a translating group that distributed Chinese-translated manga, anime, and other materials online. The titles included Yuki Ochimura ni Ojō-sama!, Yu-Gi-Oh! ARC-V and Kimi ni Todoke. The Association of Copyright for Computer Software reported that one of the suspects, a 23-year-old female company worker from Niiza City in Saitama Prefecture, translated the 123rd and final chapter of the manga Kimi ni Todoke. Police from Kanagawa, Ishikawa, Gifu, and Shiga Prefectures also worked on the case. This is the first known arrest regarding illegal manga translation in Japan.

== See also ==
- Fan labor
- Fandub
- Fan translation
- Scanlation
