= Veltpunch =

Japanese alternative rock band

- Genres: Alternative rock
- Years active: 1997–current
- Labels: 321 Records, ZK Records, Evol Records, Geneon, Sony Music Associated Records
- Members: Hidenori Naganuma; Aiko Nakajima; Naoki Asama; Shinichiro Arakawa
- Past members: Soutarou Nagumo; Matsuzaki; Taisuke Endo; Seiji Himeno
- Website: http://www.veltpunch.net/

Veltpunch is a Japanese alternative rock band which formed in 1997. They played at the SXSW music festival in Austin, Texas, USA, in March 2000. Their first major single, "Crawl", reached number 36 on the Oricon single charts in 2008 and remained on the chart for seven weeks. Crawl was also featured as an opening theme for the anime Nabari no Ou.

== Members ==
- Hidenori Naganuma (長沼 秀典, Naganuma Hidenori) (Vocals, guitar)
- Aiko Nakajima (ナカジマ アイコ, Nakajima Aiko) (Bass, vocals)
- Taisuke Endo (遠藤 泰介, Endō Taisuke) (Drums) [1997 – 2010]
- Seiji Himeno (姫野 聖二, Himeno Seiji) (Guitar) [1997 – 2012]
- Naoki Asama (浅間 直樹, Asama Naoki) (Drums) [2011–present]
- Shinichiro Arakawa (荒川 慎一郎, Arakawa Shinichiro) (Guitar) [2013–present]

== Discography ==
=== Singles ===
- "Crawl" (May 21, 2008) Oricon Style Single ranking: No. 36

=== Albums ===
- Repeat 2000 Times (Mar 21, 2000)
- When We Drive (Mar 21, 2002)
- Question No. 13 (Dec 15, 2004)
- A Huge Mistake (Oct 5, 2005, 2nd Release Nov 3, 2006)
- White Album (Aug 1, 2007)
- Paint Your Life Grey (Mar 9, 2008)
- Black Album (Feb 17, 2010)
- His Strange Fighting Pose (Aug 3, 2011)
- THE NEWEST JOKE (Jul 20, 2016)
- SUICIDE KING (Aug 5, 2020)

=== Best albums ===
- Gold Album 1997–2012 (Aug 8, 2012)
