= Odex =

Singapore-based licensing company

Odex Pte Ltd
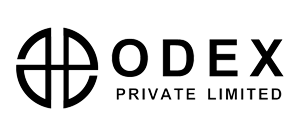
- Company type: Private Limited
- Industry: Animation-related distribution
- Founded: Singapore (1987)
- Headquarters: Singapore, Singapore
- Key people: Peter Go, CEO/Director; Stephen Sing, Enforcement Division
- Products: Video VCD / DVD
- Number of employees: 20+
- Website: http://www.odex.sg/

Odex Private Limited is a Singapore-based anime distribution company that licenses and distributes anime content for theatrical, home video, and digital platforms. It initially focused on Southeast Asia but now distributes anime films across 42 countries worldwide. Odex was established in 1987 and set up its Anime Distribution department in 2000, selling anime in Singapore. It works with Japanese licensors such as Sunrise Inc., TV Tokyo, Yomiuri TV, D-Rights, TMS, Showgate Inc and Aniplex Inc. Odex also sells programs to television stations in Singapore, Malaysia, Indonesia, such as TV3, NTV7, Astro, MediaCorp TV and StarHub TV. Other than licensing, Odex also does English dubbing, translation and subtitling for other companies. Odex also deals in anime merchandise sales.

Odex is most well known for taking legal action in 2007–2008 against home users who were allegedly downloading copyrighted anime videos from the Internet. The actions received extensive press and blog coverage, especially as they roughly coincided with similar attempts in the United States by the music industry RIAA to enforce against file sharing by home users. Issues of intellectual property, copyright protections, privacy and freedom of speech underlie these events.

== History ==
Odex Private Limited was founded in 2001 as an anime distributor in Singapore. The company initially focused on licensing Japanese anime for Southeast Asian markets.

In 2003, with the support of Japanese licensors, Odex founded the Anti-Video Piracy Association of Singapore (AVPAS). At one point, AVPAS's committee-in-charge was led by Toh See Kiat and Odex directors Peter Go and Stephen Sing.

The following year, Odex and AVPAS, with the help of the Singapore Police Force raided a major video retail chain selling pirated anime VCDs. In order to continue in its fight against video piracy, AVPAS created its official website. After a month, they started to take actions against illegal downloaders.

In 2005, Odex opened their own English dubbing studios and DVD authoring facility. Odex attracted American clients, including Bandai Entertainment, Geneon USA and the History Channel.

In 2006, the Odex-licensed title D.Gray-man was broadcast on Singaporean television within five days of its Japanese broadcast. Other shows, including Casshern Sins and Gundam 00, would follow.

In 2008, Odex would work with Mediacorp to facilitate telecasts of shows the same week they aired in Japan.

Working with Animax in 2009, Odex had titles released at the same day and time as in Japan in 42 Asian territories.

In 2010, Odex started its business in MobTV. The company brought its website back up, but only to provide a link to the MobTV website so that visitors can learn more about the Animetrix service that Odex is providing on MobTV. Odex brought the Gundam 00 movie - Awakening of the Trailblazer into Singapore theatre, released on the same day as Japan. There were two screening venues, which are at Alliance Francaise and at Sinema after the first day premiere in Singapore.

Odex made a grand presence in Anime Festival Asia (AFA), being one of the two largest booths in the event hall. They brought in a wide range of anime cushions and anime apparel under their license. They also worked with AFA organisers to put up the screening of the Gundam 00 movie - Awakening of the Trailblazer and The Disappearance of Haruhi Suzumiya during AFA.

In 2011, Odex continued its participation in AFA, focusing on merchandise sales and movie screenings such as Sora no Otoshimono the Movie: The Angeloid of Clockwork, Detective Conan: Quarter of Silence, Naruto the Movie: Blood Prison, Fullmetal Alchemist: The Sacred Star of Milos and Ryūjin Mabuyer The Movie Nanatsu no Mabui.

== Incidents ==
=== Legal action towards downloaders ===
In reaction to falling sales and evidence of home users' downloading anime videos without payment, in 2007 Odex initiated actions to track users and demand settlement or litigation. It succeeded in gaining court orders for subpoenas for two Internet service providers to provide them with subscriber data for certain IP accounts. Odex settled out of court with many downloaders, who paid fees in lieu of litigation, ranging from about SGD$3000 to SGD$5000.

=== Subtitles ===
Odex's subtitling has been criticized by the Singapore anime community for having font with lower quality and sometimes inaccurate translations, as compared to fansubs or imports (an example would be its release of "Sword Art Online: Ordinal Scale" which suffers from some glaring mistakes such as misnaming the character Eiji by his voice actor's name). Allegations were made by the online community that Odex had passed off fansubs as its own work. Sing admitted that this was partially true as Odex had hired anime fans to do subtitling in 2004 who had taken "the easy way out and copied word for word the subtitles on fansubs they downloaded". Sing explained that when Odex released its anime, the company did not realise what the anime fans had done, and it has been "paying for this mistake ever since". It was reported at the same time that all of Odex's translation and subtitling was now done "in house". However, Odex's release of The Melancholy of Haruhi Suzumiya in September 2007 was found to contain translations strongly resembling an earlier unauthorised fansub release.

Odex stated that because of the censorship laws in Singapore, they had to tweak subtitles to conform to the Board of Film Censors' (BFC) requirements. However, a BFC spokesperson denied this, saying the board preferred that subtitles be accurate.

=== Website ===
Following criticism of its anti-piracy actions, Odex set up a forum on its website, which aimed to foster and improve relationships between the company and the anime community.

Odex's website was subsequently defaced by an unknown hacker with no hacker group claiming credit for the action. The website was replaced with a note asking a boycott of Odex's products and how to download anime anonymously. The website was then taken down by Odex and a spokesman for Odex said Odex will make a police report over the hacking.

=== Shared premises ===
Emails were sent to the media saying that Sing and Go were directors and shareholders of a defunct company, Games Mart, that shared the same corporate address as Odex and had been raided in 1999 by the police for selling game consoles with unauthorized modifications. This information was confirmed by the press, and Go wrote a letter to the media explaining that Games Mart was not affiliated with Odex in any way.
