= List of Nabari no Ou characters =

Major characters of Nabari no Ou as they appear in the anime. From left to right: Gau Meguro, Raikō Shimizu, Kazuhiko Yukimi, Yoite, Miharu Rokujou, Tobari Kumohira, Raimei Shimizu, and Koichi Aizawa.

The Nabari no Ou anime and manga series features an extensive cast of characters created by Yuhki Kamatani. The series takes place in a modern-day Japan where the ninja world of Nabari (隠の世; lit. World of Concealment) is hidden from the surface world, a name given to the world unaware of Nabari. The series' storyline follows Miharu Rokujou, a 14-year-old student who unknowingly possesses a powerful secret art within him, and his introduction into Nabari upon his power's activation.

The protagonist of the series Miharu Rokujou remembers nothing of his childhood and lost his parents at an early age. However, he is not concerned by this and strives to live a normal life. This plan is compromised when Miharu is attacked by real ninja and Koichi Aizawa and Tobari Kumohira come to his aid. There, Miharu learns about the hidden ninja world of Nabari and the Shinra Banshou, a powerful secret art containing all of the world's knowledge, which resides inside of him. This secret art is so powerful, the possessor is revered as the King of Nabari and is sorely coveted after. To protect himself, Miharu is forced to join his school's Nindō club managed by his two protectors. Kumohira vows to find a way to remove the secret art from Miharu. Until then, Kumohira, Aizawa, and Raimei Shimizu, a samurai from their ally the Fuuma Village, must protect Miharu from the Grey Wolves, a squad of elite ninja who lead the search for the secret art, and foil the Grey Wolves' attempts to gather each ninja village's kinjutsushō (禁術は; lit. Forbidden Technique).

== Banten Village ==
During the Sengoku period, Banten (萬天) Village was a dispatch post of Iga Village. After the creation of the kinjutsushō Engetsurin (円月輪; lit. Circular Moon Ring), it was considered to be an independent village. It was always small and is currently on the verge of extinction. Its members are known as the conservatives of the Shinra Banshou, Nabari's most powerful and coveted secret art. There are three Banten ninja: Miharu Rokujou, Tobari Kumohira, and Koichi Aizawa. Miharu is the possessor of the Shinra Banshou. Aizawa is one of Miharu's classmates. Although he seems to be a normal 14-year-old, he was originally an owl who became immortal after a former possessor of the Shinra Banshou experimented on him. Tobari is Aizawa's and Miharu's teacher in the front world. The village has no leader throughout the duration of the story's events. In the anime adaptation however, Tobari Kumohira is acting as the temporary leader. The Engetsurin's effect and whereabouts of the kinjutsushō are known only to Tobari. Although it has been seen in the manga adaptation in the recent updates, it has only been used once during the anime adaptation. It is located on a silver cuff on Kumohira's ear and has the ability to restore memories. The kinjutsushō is so powerful that it is able to restore memories to people who did not have the memory to begin with.

=== Miharu Rokujou ===
Miharu Rokujou (六条 壬晴, Rokujō Miharu) is an apathetic 14-year-old middle school student and protagonist of the series. Although Nabari's most powerful secret art, the coveted Shinra Banshou (森羅万象, Shinrabanshō; lit. All Things in Nature), is literally written into his body and he is venerated by all of Nabari's ninja as king, Miharu cares little about his gift's profound merits. His only goal is to inherit the family's okonomiyaki store. To protect those around him from getting hurt, he acts indifferently although he is not averse to acting in a rather innocent and cute manner to get what he wants. Miharu actually yearns for friendship and love at heart. After Miharu meets Yoite and promises to erase him in exchange for his friends' lives, his indifference begins to sway as his concern starts to revolve around Yoite. As the bond between them tightens, Miharu begins to wish for Yoite's continued existence, and offers to use Shinra Banshou to save him when Yoite collapses in a near death state from overuse of Iga Village's kinjutsushō, Kira. However, Yoite dissuades him from doing this and dies before the erasure can transpire. The Shinra Banshou spirit comments that Miharu fulfills a wish of his own although he fails to erase Yoite's existence. After a one-month rest, Miharu wakes up without any memories of Yoite, although he vaguely recalls erasing a person. He is voiced by Rie Kugimiya in Japanese and Brina Palencia in English.

=== Kouichi Aizawa ===
Kouichi Aizawa (相澤 虹一, Aizawa Kōichi) is Rokujou's seemingly 14-year-old classmate who studies Nindō under Kumohira. He is normally portrayed with an energetic attitude around other people, becoming serious and relentless when it comes to ninja duties. He is fascinated with death as a result of his immortality. His immortality is attributed to the holder of the Shinra Banshou during the Edo period, who was a medical practitioner who experimented with placing the wisdom of the Shinra Banshou into animals, since humans usually died. He and Shijima Kurookano are the only survivors of the experiments and gained immortality; they believe that their mission is to observe the end of Nabari. This implies that Kouichi, and subsequently Shijima, are at least a century old. Kouichi's ultimate goal to have the Shinra Banshou release him from immortality and ensure that another immortal being or "monster" like himself is never created again. They are together referred to as the Hakutaku (白澤) The Aizawa household are descended from Fuuma ninjas and are native Banten ninja. Kouichi has also confessed his love to Raimei, though she has not yet given him an answer. He is voiced by Satoshi Hino in Japanese and Chris Burnett in English.

=== Tobari Durandal Kumohira ===
Tobari Durandal Kumohira (雲平・帷・デュランダル, Kumohira Tobari Dyurandaru) is Miharu Rokujou's and Koichi Aizawa's 25-year-old teacher in the front world, the world that is unaware of Nabari. Born in Ireland, he was forced by his grandfather, a "Japan otaku" and "ninja fanatic", to go to Japan and learn to become a ninja. Kumohira is unable to return home partly due to an intense hatred of transport resulting from amaxophobia, a fear of being or riding in vehicles. Shortly after his arrival in Japan, he became a close acquaintance to the Rokujou family. He was involved in an incident involving the Shinra Banshou and the deaths of its current user, Asahi Rokujou, her husband, and Tobari's grandfather. The incident was erased from the memories of every one involved individual through the Shinra Banshou's power and Miharu's memories of Tobari's acquaintance with the Rokujou family were lost. Tobari is the only one to remember the incident. In the world of Nabari, he is a ninja of the Banten Village. He is entirely devoted to protecting Rokujou, and wants him to become the king of Nabari. In the anime adaption, he is the temporary leader as the current leader is away while in the manga, he is not a stand-in, but has the power to arrange for a temporary leader. According to Aizawa, Kumohira has probably recorded Banten's kinjutsushō through verbal communication. Among the Banten ninja, Kumohira is the most vehement dissident against Miharu using the Shinra Banshou, instead advocating its permanent seal. This often results in him going to great length to dissuade Miharu from attempting to activate it, which clashes with Miharu's promise to Yoite. After realizing Miharu's determination to fulfill his promise, Kumohira goes into hiding to conceal the whereabouts of the last kinjutsushō, Banten's Engetsurin, from those trying to find it. Following the Shinra Banshou's latest activation, he has returned to Banten. He is voiced by Daisuke Namikawa in Japanese and Eric Vale in English.

== Fuuma Village ==
Fuuma (風魔, Fūma; lit. Demon Wind) Village is a village allied with Banten found deep within a forest in the Japanese countryside. Nearly all the texts regarding ninjutsu and the Shinra Banshou has been written the village's leader Kotarou Fuuma. The Shimizu clan, which resides in Fuuma, are guardians of the world of Nabari and the Shinra Banshou and are to always act neutrally. Fuuma's kinjutsushō is the Tenpenka (転変化; lit. Change). The Tenpenka reshapes the cells of the user into any desired shape. However, because the cells are being reshaped, they will eventually misalign, collapse, and die.

=== Raimei Shimizu ===
Raimei Shimizu (清水 雷鳴, Shimizu Raimei) is a 14-year-old guardian of the world of Nabari and head of Fuuma Village's Shimizu clan. She prefers to fight with a sword named Kurogamon (黒我聞) over using ninjutsu to the point of claiming to be a samurai. Five years ago, her older brother Raikō annihilated their clan. She has sworn to kill him in revenge. The two reconcile and stay on friendly terms after Raimei learns that the massacre was Raikō's vengeance against their uncle and his gang, who killed Raikō and Raimei's parents. She has a tendency to mistake one person for another or reveal information she intended to keep to herself when excited. She is voiced by Ayumi Fujimura in Japanese and Kate Oxley in English.

=== Kotarou Fuuma ===
Kotarou Fuuma (風魔 小太郎, Fūma Kotarō) is the leader of Fuuma Village and a chief consultant of MEXT. He has written almost all the texts regarding ninjutsu and the Shinra Banshou and all about the world of Nabari and ninja techniques, with the exception of the kinjutsu of other villages. He loves women as he claims that if he had the power of the Shinra Banshou, he would turn the Fuuma Village into a paradise where all the world's women are in love with him. Most of Fuuma's residents are female. According to Raimei, he is lying ninety percent of the time. He has spies hidden within the other ninja villages. He is voiced by Ryōtarō Okiayu in Japanese and Sonny Strait in English.

=== Saraba ===
Saraba (サラバ, Saraba) is Kotarou's second-in-command. She is a no-nonsense woman and acts much like an older sister to Raimei and Jūji, calling Raimei once Raikō has been spotted. Assists in locating him. She is voiced by Akeno Watanabe in Japanese and Luci Christian in English.

=== Jūji Minami ===
Jūji Minami (南 十字, Minami Jūji) is a 12-year-old medical ninja who has accompanied Miharu on several missions. It is implied that she may have a crush on Miharu. She is voiced by Kimiko Koyama in Japanese and Trina Nishimura in English.

== Kairoushuu/Iga ==
The Grey Wolves (灰狼衆, Kairōshū; lit. Ashen Wolf Pack, Kairoshu in the anime) are a squad of elite ninja independent from the Iga (伊賀) Village led by Tōjūrō Hattori. The Iga Village is said to be connected to the birth of the Shinra Banshou and the Grey Wolves are the main force seeking it. As such, the Grey Wolves are the main antagonists. They aim to remove the Shinra Banshou from Miharu Rokujou and are stealing the kinjutsushō from other villages. The group is split into specialized sub-divisions. The Jicchi Suikō-Han (実地遂行班; lit. Actual Site Accomplishment Party), shortened Suikō-Han, handles all operations in the field and is responsible for the acquisition of the kinjutsushō from other villages. The Hijutsu Kenkyū-Han (秘術研究班; lit. Hijutsu Research Party) researches the Shinra Banshou and through studying the kinjutsushō, investigates ways to extract and control the secret art. The Wakachi (分刀; lit. Minute Sword), also known as the Zōhansha Torishimari-nin (造反者取締人; lit. Rebellion Supervisors), are responsible for managing the rebels within the organization often through elimination. The Grey Wolves' secret intelligence unit Kasa (傘; lit. Umbrella) is part of the Ministry on Defense. In the anime adaption, the secret intelligence unit is called Tattegami (鬣; lit. Mane). The Grey Wolves' leader Tōjūrō Hattori often takes in outcasts, as seen when he takes in Kazuhiko and Kazuho Yukimi, Raikō Shimizu, and Yoite, offering them a place within the organization. Iga Village is very modernized, using the internet to keep the villagers in touch with each other. Kira (気羅) is the village's kinjutsushō.

=== Tojuro Hattori ===
Tojuro Hattori (服部 柊十郎, Hattori Tojūrō) is the 59-year-old leader of the Iga clan and the Grey Wolves. He serves as a political critic in the front world. His ideal is to change history and achieve equality among humans with the Shinra Banshou, fascinating and winning the loyalty of many subordinates, as seen with Yukimi and Raikō. Hattori takes in many outcasts, such as Yukimi, Kazuho, Raikō, and later Yoite, offering them a place in the Grey Wolves. Despite this kindness, Hattori has little qualms about eliminating whoever opposes him, seen when he orders the Kasa to dispose of Yoite when he defies Hattori. After the Shinra Banshou's latest activation, he temporarily retires from Nabari and entrusts the Grey Wolves and Kasa to an unknown person. He is voiced by Jōji Nakata in Japanese and Kent Williams in English.

=== Ichiki ===
Ichiki (一季) is often seen in the company of Hattori. She is the 49-year-old leader of Kasa. In the front world, she acts as the manager for Hattori's political career. Ichiki is always seen dressed in a traditional kimono and appears to be blind. She is voiced by Yuri Amano in Japanese and Jamie Marchi in English.

=== Yoite ===
Yoite (宵風) is a 16-year-old ninja. He uses the Iga's kinjutsushō, "Kira", which shoots the user's ki into the target's body and destroys it from the inside out; causing the target's bones to break or their body to completely explode. However, the cost of using this technique is the loss of the user's life force, gradually losing their five senses and eventually dying. When Yoite is introduced, he has only a few months left to live. Yoite first meets Miharu when retrieving Fuuma's kinjutsushō. The two slowly form a bond after Miharu promises to use the Shinra Banshou to fulfill Yoite's wish: To be erased from existence. In turn, Yoite will make Miharu the ruler of Nabari. As their bond deepens, he becomes more protective of Miharu and begins to show rebellious signs toward Grey Wolf leader, Hattori, when Miharu in harm's way by his orders. Yoite becomes openly rebellious when Hattori attempts to persuade Miharu to not grant Yoite's wish, causing Hattori to send Kasa assassins after Yoite and Miharu. When Miharu is captured by the assassins, Yoite, Koichi, and Shijima rescue him. However, the lethal side effects of Kira take their toll on Yoite. In the manga, he thanks Miharu for staying with him and asks Miharu to be happy. He asks Miharu to erase him, but perishes before the Shinra Banshou can be used. The Shinra Banshou notes that, though Miharu's wish came too late, his desire still came true. Though it is unknown exactly what Miharu's wish was, no one can remember Yoite. Therefore, it seems clear he was erased, to some extent (especially since the scar he gave Miharu is gone). However, since the characters themselves or the events they are faced with do not seem altered, it is unclear how well he was disappeared from the world. Yukimi and Miharu also recall that someone close to them is gone, and express extreme loneliness over it - though they cannot remember who it was that was erased. Yoite had an extremely sad and miserable life, which is the reason he so desperately wanted to be decimated from the world. In the anime, he decides that he does want to die instead of disappearing. He spends the rest of his days with Miharu and the others. Miharu is out of the room getting him lemon cider when Yoite actually dies but returns to the room at the last moment to see him ( who has turned into dust) blow away in the wind. Yoite was born intersex, named Sora (そら), although Yoite never considered it to be his name. His mother died in childbirth and his father considered him a death god for that reason. He was confined to the basement and his half-brother Kōdō Tsukasa (香道司, Tsukasa Kōdō) was forbidden to approach him. When Yoite turned fourteen, his family decided to kill him, slashing his throat and unsuccessfully attempting to force Tsukasa to do the same. In the anime, he is then pushed off of a balcony by his parents while they say "Why didn't you die." and "Only if you'd died." He is then seen lying on the street when Hattori drives up and takes him in. After this attempt on his life, being erased from existence became his goal. He ran from the house and was saved by Hattori, who accepted him into the Grey Wolves. Yoite spends a year studying the Kira technique and all required ninja skills. Hattori promises this would bring him closer to his goal of being erased. Yoite is placed under Yukimi's care and is given the name Yoite. Shortly before Yoite dies, he realizes that he was alive all along, because he had Miharu and Yukimi there for him. He expresses his happiness that he was not alone in this world, and tells Miharu that he is fully satisfied simply being the "Yoite" that Miharu and Yukimi know. He then again asks Miharu to erase him - not for his sake, but so that Miharu won't succumb to sadness over Yoite's death, and can continue smiling. After mentioning his desire to return to Yukimi's home (reminiscent of the time he left Yukimi's home, stating only "bye", causing Yukimi to ask, "isn't it 'see you later'?" - Yoite now, finally, truly sees Yukimi's home as his home) and for Miharu to make some more okonimiyaki, Yoite dies, happy and satisfied. (Miharu erases memories of Yoite, but he later reveals that he thinks Yoite may not be entirely dead, but "scattered" instead.) In the anime, Yoite lives out the remainder of his life with Thobari, Hanabusa, and Gau. When he dies, his body evaporates into sparkling lights. He is voiced by Mitsuki Saiga in Japanese and Joel McDonald in English.

=== Kazuhiko Yukimi ===
Kazuhiko Yukimi (雪見 和彦, Yukimi Kazuhiko) is a 27-year-old ninja. He acts as a squad leader on field missions and is a freelance writer in the front world. he appears to be very efficient at hand-to-hand combat, but unlike other Shinobi, he also uses a gun. He justifies this unusual weapon choice by claiming that this is the modern age, or "age of the individual." He lives with Yoite and is protective of him and cares for Yoite as his health degenerates. Although he claims he hates kids and calls them "brats", he shows overwhelming concern for Yoite and Miharu. Yukimi documents any impressions Yoite makes on him and any details he learns about Yoite. He learns Yoite's past from Yoite's half-brother Tsukasa. He wishes to learn as much as possible about Yoite so he can tell Yoite that he was truly alive when Yoite is on his deathbed. When he learns of Yoite's defection from the Grey Wolves and the subsequent escape with Miharu, Yukimi goes out of his way to battle Raikō, who initial advises him against protecting Yoite and betraying the Grey Wolves. However, Raikō reveals Yoite destination. Yukimi joins Yoite, Koichi, and Shijima in rescuing Miharu. While fending off two Kasa assassins, he loses his right arm. One month later, he recovers in a Banten hospital and has severed his ties with the Grey Wolves to protect Miharu. He is asked by Tobari to stay at Miharu's side because they share pain of losing Yoite. He is voiced by Kenjirō Tsuda in Japanese and Robert McCollum in English.

=== Kazuho Amatatsu ===
Kazuho Amatatsu (天立 和穂, Amatatsu Kazuho), née Yukimi, is a 26-year-old member of the Grey Wolves' Hijutsu Kenkyū-han and Kazuhiko Yukimi's younger sister. She has a medical license and acts as Yoite's personal physician. Despite her license, her Surface World job is working in a sushi restaurant. In the anime adaption, this restaurant is owned by her husband. She defected from the Grey Wolves because the organization attempted to kill Yukimi. She is using her knowledge of the secret art to aid Banten in its extraction. She is voiced by Yui Kano in Japanese and Caitlin Glass in English.

=== Raikō Shimizu ===
Raikō Shimizu (清水 雷光, Shimizu Raikō) is a 20-year-old samurai of the Shimizu clan. He fights with a sword named Shirogamon (白我聞), the partner to his sister Raimei's sword. When he was fifteen, his clan dissolved into anarchy and slaughtered each other, with the exception of his sister Raimei, who was led to believe Raikou had killed their entire family. This action is vengeance against his uncle and his gang, who murdered his parents in a coup d'état to take over the clan. After this, he joins the Grey Wolves. He chooses not to tell Raimei his motives behind the massacre to protect her innocence. This leads to a battle between the two. During this battle, his partner Gau is injured trying to stop them and goes comatose. Although Kōga Village's kinjutsushō could have waken Gau up, Raikō refuses to sacrifice the humans needed to use the kinjutsushō, fearing that Gau would never forgive him for it. Yoite finally wakes Gau up. Because of this, Raikō feels indebted to Yoite and even disobeys Hattori to allow Yukimi to help Yoite. Eventually, Raikō forfeits his loyalty to the Grey Wolves, particularly Hattori, and is denounced as an expendable pawn who is easily replaced. He helps rescue Miharu from the Grey Wolves. He is shown to be living with Gau at the series end. Raikō is portrayed as rather an easygoing if aloof person who takes his responsibilities very seriously. He is shown to be extremely composed and is rarely ruffled or outwardly angered, although he will fiercely protect Gau from harm and his past history with his family remains a sore-point. It is implied that he is a sadist. His Surface World job is a maker of calligraphy paper, a job that his co-workers say he is exceptionally skilled in. At the end of the anime he is killed by Hattori. He is voiced by Junichi Suwabe in Japanese and J. Michael Tatum in English.

=== Gau Meguro ===
Three years after his mother had been killed, 17-year-old Gau Meguro (目黒 俄雨, Meguro Gau) was saved by Raikō and is thus extremely devoted to him, as well as heavily implied to be romantically enamored with him. He assists Raikō with his responsibilities to the Grey Wolves, usually compiling reports and taking samples from their targets. He is easily incited and received the nickname "Tenpa-kun" (テンパ君), from the slang tenparu (テンパる; lit. about to blow a fuse). He believes Wakachi exists to protect the front world from the evils of Nabari. He is an idealist, who believes that the Shinra Banshou can be used to save the world. He knows Raikō's true motives behind the massacre of the Shimizu clan and is the one who reveals the truth to Raimei. When the pair fight against one another, Gau attempts to stop them and becomes comatose. Raikō refuses to sacrifice humans necessary to use Kōga Village's kinjutsushō to wake him up; it is Yoite who wakes Gau. Gau feels deeply indebted to Yoite and chooses to support him and even goes against the Grey Wolves to aid Yoite. At the end of the anime he is shown to be living Thobari, Hanabusa, and Yoite. His a fan of classical music and hates mess, dirt and clutter. His Surface World job was a brief stint in a country farm store when he was forced to leave school after fleeing the Grey Wolves with Raikō. He is voiced by Nobuhiko Okamoto in Japanese and Greg Ayres in English.

== Other characters ==
=== Shinra Banshou ===
The Shinra Banshou (森羅万象, Shinrabanshō; lit. All Things in Nature, Shinrabansho in the anime) is personified as an enigmatic white-haired girl with long nails. Miharu commonly refers to her as Miss Fairy (妖精-さん, Yōsei-san). As the true form of the Shinra Banshou, she exists within Miharu, and constantly attempts to entice him into drawing from her powers, believing it is inevitable. In the anime adaption, she tells Oda that she does not want to grant Miharu's wish to Yoite because it is a boring wish and it is not Miharu's own wish. Although she is an intangible persona that resides within Miharu, she has appeared to Tobari once to taunt him. She is voiced by Yukari Tamura in Japanese and Monica Rial in English.

=== Yae Oda ===
Yae Oda (織田 八重, Oda Yae) is the leader of Togakushi (戸隠) Village and president of Fog Blue, a small-scale dispatch company and the form the village takes in the front world. She can use Togakushi's kinjutsushō Izuna Shingan (飯綱心眼; lit. Fox Spirit's Mind's Eye), which gives the user the ability to see into the hearts of others, but lose the ability to use ninjutsu. She agrees to give the scroll containing the kinjutsushō on the condition the assassinate a Professor Flosetti for her. She wishes for Flosetti's death due to past events regarding her child, Alisa. Oda and her daughter were in a car accident and Alisa needed a blood transfusion. One of Flosetti's business partners was at the scene and matched Alisa's blood type, but refused to donate because he would lose his chance to make a name for himself. In the anime adaption, the same business partner was conducting human experiments with particular drugs and tricked Oda, who was blinded by the desire to save her daughter, into giving the drug to her daughter. Oda blames this man for Alisa's death and attempts to kill Flosetti to ruin the man's future. Miharu convinces Oda to never use the Izuna Shingan after witnessing the profound effect her words have on the mentally unstable Yoite. In the anime adaption, her role is extended. After Miharu and Yoite learn that Yoite has only one month to live, the pair visit Oda in her home and ask her to ask the Shinra Banshou if they can use its power without Banten's Engetsurin scroll. At the same time the secret intelligence branch of the Grey Wolves the Tattegami destroy the Fog Blue office building. Afterwards, the Tattegami kidnap Oda, Yoite, and Miharu. The Grey Wolves use ninjutsu and medication to gain her cooperation, but she continually asks about Togakushi's annihilation and refuses to answer the Grey Wolves' questions to the point Hattori needs to personally confront her. She is rescued by Fuuma Village and Katō. She is voiced by Satsuki Yukino in Japanese and Colleen Clinkenbeard in English.

=== Sōrō Katō ===
Sōrō Katō (加藤 候, Katō Sōrō) is subordinate of Oda, who turns out to be a spy for Kotarou Fuuma. He is later seen working in a front world library that contains documents on the world of Nabari. He admittedly loves Oda, but is not allowed to return to Togakushi Village or the company because he betrayed her. Despite this, he expresses desires to return there. His specialty is judging what in people's thought, also good at mind manipulation, and anti-mind reading which he used as a spy to avoid being found out by Oda. In the anime adaption, he infiltrates a Grey Wolf hotel to save Oda. He is voiced by Tetsuya Kakihara in Japanese and Chris Patton in English.

=== Hanabusa Seki ===
Hanabusa Seki (関 英, Seki Hanabusa) is Tobari's live-in lover and is older than him by a few years. She is a paleontologist and is often away on work-related business. She knows that Tobari is a ninja, but she does not understand any of the details about Nabari because he has not told her. She has saved Yoite's life in the past and acts like a surrogate mother to both Yoite and Miharu. She is one to take action and will meddle in other people's affairs when they are too shy or afraid to take any action on their own. She often says what comes to her mind without any prior explanation. She is voiced by Kotono Mitsuishi in Japanese and Leah Clark in English.

=== Shijima Kurookano ===
Shijima Kurookano (黒岡野 しじま, Kurookano Shijima), like Aizawa, has survived experiments performed by the holder of Shinra Banshou, a medical practitioner, during the Edo period. The holder used the Shinra Banshou to give a human heart to a cat, who became Shijima. Because of these experiments, it is implied she is at least a century and a half old. She involves herself in various situations only to observe humans. For observation purposes, she became a ninja of Kōga (甲賀) Village and a student of Alya Academy, the school Kōga Village takes the form of in the front world. When the Alya students attack the Grey Wolves and the Banten ninja, she goes after Miharu and Yoite and reveals herself as inhuman. When the leader of Kōga Village dies, she receives the scroll containing Kōga's kinjutsushō Daya (蛇薬; lit. Serpent Medicine) and, in turn, she gives it to Miharu. When not in human form, Shijima is disguised as Miharu's cat, Shiratama (シラタマ), and has been since before Miharu's birth. She is similar in appearance to the spirit of the Shinra Banshou. She is voiced by Kei Shindō in Japanese and Cherami Leigh in English.

=== Tsukasa Kōdō ===
Tsukasa Kōdō (香道 司, Kōdō Tsukasa) is Yoite's younger half-brother. Although he was generally forbidden to approach Sora as a child, he still made contact on occasion, going to speak through the window of the basement to Sora, and at one point, leading him outside to play a game of catch. Their father threatened Tsukasa with a similar fate to Sora's, should they interact again, saying, "That's a ghost. If you interact with it again, I'll make sure you never existed, too!" Tsukasa was present during the attempt on Sora's life; he was told to participate as well, but refused. This allowed Sora's escape, and accounts for the fact that he lived through it. Tsukasa harbors a great amount of guilt for his inability to further help his half-sibling. After entering high school, the disagreement he held with his family was too much, and he moved away, on his own, to the town in which Sora's attempted murder had taken place. Later, he meets Kazuhiko Yukimi, and Yukimi becomes aware of the fact that Tsukasa is Yoite's brother. However, instead of relaying this to Tsukasa, Yukimi simply says that Sora is dead. After Yoite's erasure, Tsukasa keeps in contact with Yukimi (and then Miharu), sometimes visiting with Yukimi's cat, also christened Yoite.

== Reception ==
The Nabari no Ou characters have received praise from reviewers of Anime News Network. Carlo Santos commented that the "teenage hero discovers amazing hidden powers" was done before. However, he believed the character designs are interesting, "spiky and stylish" and are almost as stylish as the characters of Tite Kubo's Bleach manga. He commented that the character Miharu is a perfect foil for Raimei and in the wrong hands, the characters' traits "would end up as tiresome gags". Casey Brienza was impressed with how faithfully Kamatani's "eccentric style" was animated. She said that the emaciated and bony male characters look "just as out of proportion on the screen as they do on the page", citing the designs as an example of "anorexic chic." She comments that all of the characters have some "bizarre quirk". Carl Kimlinger said that the series' premise sounds a little boring and the characters being ninja makes little difference. However, the distinctive character designs and the "properly over-the-top personalities" do make a difference. He comments that Miharu is rather "girly-looking", but the characters in general are good-looking. Ben Leary of Mania.com that he was ambivalent about Miharu's indifference and said it was conceptually an "interesting move", but he is not sure if it is working as intended. Erin Finnegan of PopCultureShock said Miharu is cute enough, even for dōjinshi.
