= Demand letter =

Legal letter

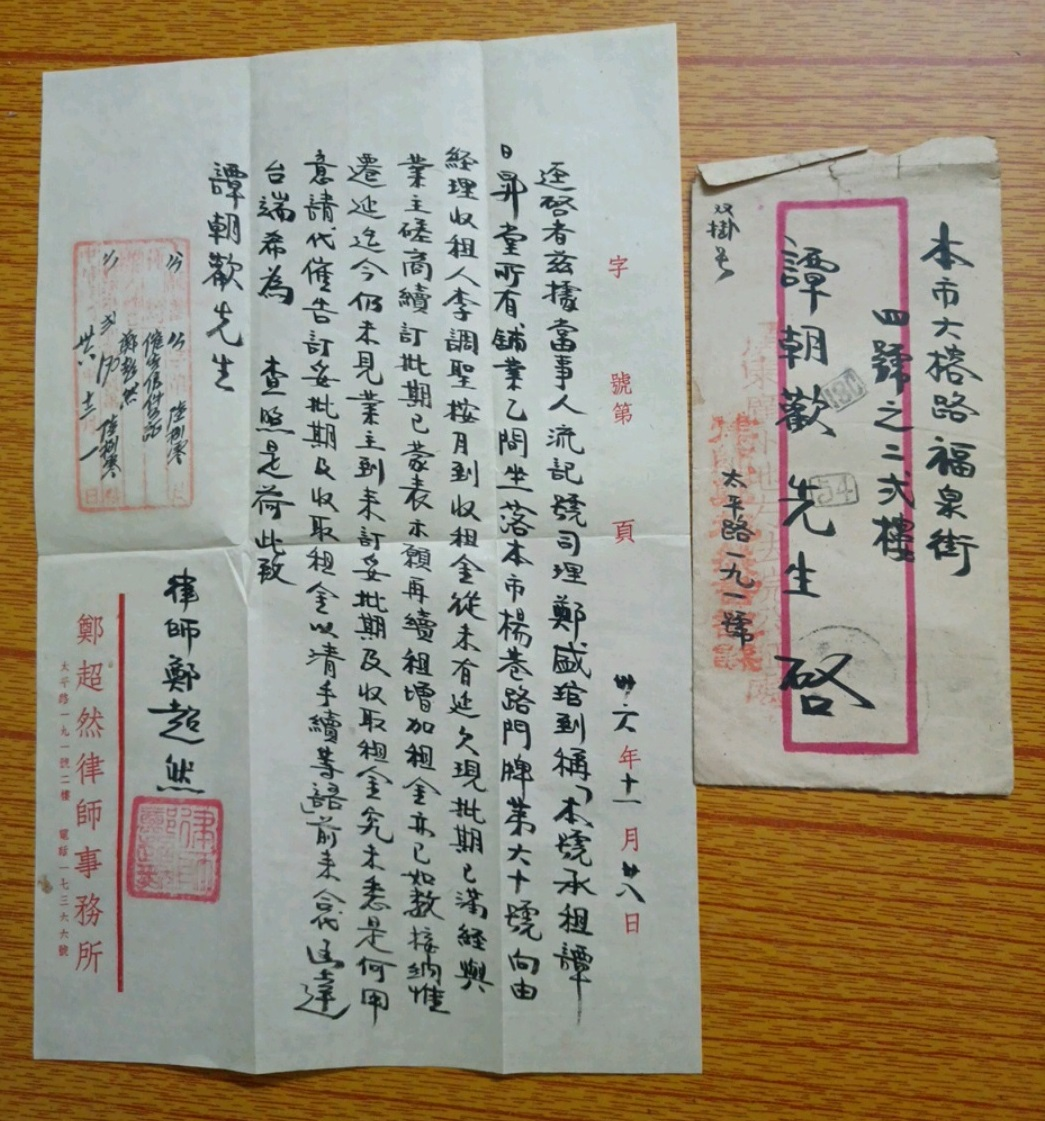
A demand letter written in 1947 for requesting rental payment of a real estate in Guangzhou, China

A demand letter, letter of demand, (of payment), letter before action, or letter before claim, is a letter stating a legal claim (usually drafted by a lawyer) which makes a demand for restitution or performance of some obligation, owing to the recipients' alleged breach of contract, or for a legal wrong. Although demand letters are not legally required they are frequently used, especially in contract law, tort law, and commercial law cases. In some cases, evidence of attempts to settle are required before a court case will be accepted by the court, and demand letters are commonly used to fulfill this requirement. For example, if one anticipates a breach, it is advantageous to send a demand letter asserting that the other side appears to be in breach and requesting assurances of performances. Demand letters that are not responded to may constitute admissions by silence. Also, a demand letter will often generate a denial letter stating the basis for rejecting claim (such as when the incorrect entity is sued), and is sometimes a good indication of what defenses will be raised if a suit is brought later.

Demand letters are sometimes used as a form of harassment and/or intimidation.

== Insurance claims ==
In personal injury claims, the settlement negotiation process begins by the victim submitting a demand letter to the insurance companies. The purpose of the demand letter is to present facts about the accident in order to persuade the insurance companies to provide adequate compensation. A typical demand letter is structured in the following manner:

- Description of the Accident
- Discussion of Accident Liability
- Description of Personal injuries
- Description of Medical treatments
- List of Medical Bills/Lost Income Statements
- Injury Settlement Demand

The personal injury demand letter is then sent to the insurance companies with supplemental documents that are referenced in the letter. This may include copies of accident reports, photographs of the accident/injuries, medical bills, doctor's statements etc.

The insurance company will then analyze the arguments made in the demand letter and respond with a counter settlement offer.

== Debt collection ==
In the United States, demand letters from a debt collector relating to a consumer debt must comply with the Fair Debt Collection Practices Act.

In certain types of legal proceedings in Quebec, a demand letter is mandatory; without it, a person could lose their case.

== See also ==
- Legal threat
- Cease and desist
