= File sharing in Canada =

File sharing in Canada relates to the distribution of digital media in that country. Canada had the greatest number of file sharers by percentage of population in the world according to a 2004 report by the OECD. In 2009 however it was found that Canada had only the tenth greatest number of copyright infringements in the world according to a report by BayTSP, a U.S. anti-piracy company.

== Legality ==
Important distinctions have been made about the legality of downloading versus uploading copyrighted material as well as "musical works" versus other copyrighted material. In general, the unauthorized copying or distribution of copyrighted material for profit is illegal under Canada's Copyright Act; however, the act also states under the section "Copying for Private Use ... onto an audio recording medium for the private use of the person who makes the copy does not constitute an infringement of the copyright in the musical work, the performer’s performance or the sound recording.". Furthermore, the Act contains a Private Copying exception that makes it legal to copy a sound recording onto an "audio recording medium" for the personal use of the person making the copy. This is supported by a levy on blank audio recording media, which is distributed to record labels and musicians.

While the unauthorized copying - uploading - of complete copyrighted works such as books, movies, or software is illegal under the Act, the situation regarding music files is more complex, due to the Private Copying exemption.

First, to qualify as Private Copying, the copy must be made onto an "audio recording medium". However, there remains some controversy as to whether certain things such as digital music players, or computer hard drives, constitute audio recording media. In 2003, the Copyright Board introduced levies of up to $25 on non-removable memory in digital music players such as the iPod. However, this was struck down when the Federal Court of Appeal ruled that memory permanently embedded in digital music players could not be considered an audio recording medium. The court also gave the opinion that a digital music player, as an entire unit or device, could not be considered an audio recording medium. However, the Copyright Board disputes the latter, and maintains that "it is not settled law that a digital audio recorder is not a medium". Copying onto an audio recording medium for which no levy is currently charged still qualifies under the Private Copying exemption: "For instance, simply because the Board has not been asked to certify a tariff on hard disks in personal computers, it does not follow that private copies made onto such media infringe copyright."

The application of the Private Copying exemption to copies made via the Internet is also a complex issue. Prior to 2004, some analysts believed that it was legal to download music, but not to upload it.

For a brief period in 2004/2005, the sharing of copyrighted music files via peer-to-peer online systems was explicitly legal, due to a decision by the Federal Court, in BMG Canada Inc. v. John Doe. Under certain conditions both downloading and uploading were held to be legal. Specifically, paragraphs [24] and [25] of the decision stated that Section 80(1) of the Copyright Act allows downloading of musical works for personal use. This section specifically applied to musical works and therefore the decision made no determination as to the legality of downloading other forms of copyrighted works.

Paragraphs [26] to [28] of the decision also made a ruling on uploading, stating that

The mere fact of placing a copy on a shared directory in a computer where that copy can be accessed via a P2P service does not amount to distribution. Before it constitutes distribution, there must be a positive act by the owner of the shared directory, such as sending out the copies or advertising that they are available for copying.

However, the case was appealed, and on May 19, 2005, this section of the decision was set aside by the Federal Court of Appeal. The appeals court dismissed the case, primarily due to lack of evidence linking the unnamed defendants to the alleged copyright infringement. However, it held that it was inappropriate for the original trial court judge to have ruled on the question of whether making music files available on peer-to-peer file sharing systems constitutes "distribution" (illegal under the Copyright Act) or simply facilitates "private copying" (legal under the Act) at that point in the proceedings. The appeals court specifically left open the possibility of future lawsuits, wherein the question of the legality of peer-to-peer sharing could be addressed. So far, no further such lawsuits have been filed in Canada, leaving it an open question.

In June 2005, the Canadian federal government, then ruled by the Liberal Party of Canada, introduced Bill C-60, which would amend the Copyright Act to, among other things, specifically make the "making available" of copyrighted music files on peer-to-peer systems illegal. However, parliament was dissolved later that year due to a non-confidence motion, and the bill was never passed.

A new copyright bill was expected to be introduced by the newly installed Conservative government before the end of 2007. It was expected to have much stronger protections for copyright owners, including some provisions similar to the American DMCA. However, due to massive public outcry in the days leading up to the bill's expected introduction, the government delayed its introduction. Just before the end of the second session of the 39th Canadian Parliament, the Conservative government introduced Bill C-61. Bill C-61 was superseded by Bill C-32 (40th Canadian Parliament, 3rd Session), which was introduced into Parliament on June 2, 2010.

On September 29, 2011, Minister of Canadian Heritage James Moore and Minister of Industry Christian Paradis announced the reintroduction of the Government of Canada's Copyright Modernization Act under the new designation of Bill C-11. This was signed into law on June 29, 2012, as the Copyright Modernization Act.

== Legal history ==
=== 1921: Copyright Act of Canada ===
Copyright law in Canada grew out of a long series of British statutes and common law, including the Statute of Anne and the Imperial Copyright Act of 1911. It was first consolidated into one Canadian statute in 1921, the Copyright Act of Canada. The Act has been amended over the years by various Bills passed by the Canadian parliament.

=== 1997: Bill C-32 ===
Bill C-32, which received Royal Assent in 1997, amended the Copyright Act of Canada. Among the changes was a provision that legalized music file sharing under certain conditions. The provision states that copying copyrighted sound recordings of musical works for the personal use of the person making the copy, does not constitute a violation of the copyright of that work.

=== 2003: Copyright Board of Canada and P2P filesharing ===
The Copyright Board of Canada is a regulatory body empowered to establish the amounts and kinds of levies to be charged on blank audio media under the Private Copying section of the Copyright Act. On December 12, 2003, it released a decision setting the levies to be charged for 2003 and 2004. In relation to this, it also commented in response to queries that were made regarding the legality of P2P file sharing. The Copyright Board gave the opinion that Private Copying of copyrighted sound recordings for one's personal use was legal, irrespective of the source of that material. Users of P2P networks were thus clear of liability for copyright violations for any music file downloading activity. The decision noted that distributing music online was expressly excluded from the Private Copying exception, and it associated the word "uploading" with the act of distribution.

The Copyright Board is not a court, and its opinion regarding the legality of downloading was publicly disputed by the Canadian Recording Industry Association. However, this decision was thought to be significant in that it provided guidance for court rulings on file sharing in the future.

=== 2004: BMG Canada Inc. v. John Doe ===
In 2004, the Canadian Recording Industry Association (CRIA) was dealt a blow in its bid to take action against 29 internet users with extensive file sharing activities. The CRIA filed suit to have the ISPs reveal the identities of the 29 file sharers. In the ruling, both the Federal Court of Canada and the Federal Court of Appeal judged that the CRIA's case was not strong enough to support interfering with the defendants right to privacy and questioned whether the CRIA had a copyright case at all based on its evidence. Because the ISPs were not required to reveal the identities of their clients, the CRIA could not go on to sue the file sharers in a manner mimicking the RIAA's legal proceedings in the U.S.A. The court further found that both downloading music and putting it in a shared folder available to other people online were legal in Canada. This decision dealt a major blow to attempts by the CRIA to crack down on file sharers.

=== 2005: BMG Canada Inc. v. John Doe - Appeal ===
In 2005, the controversial ruling of Justice Konrad von Finckenstein, making file uploading of sound recordings on peer-to-peer systems legal, was set aside by the Federal Court of Appeal. The Court of Appeal held that although the original case should be dismissed due to lack of evidence linking the unnamed defendants to the alleged copyright infringements, the question of the legality of peer-to-peer file sharing must be decided in a future case.

=== 2007: RCMP toleration for personal and non-profit use ===
Around the same time that the CRIA successfully took Demonoid offline, the Royal Canadian Mounted Police (RCMP) made it clear that pursuing Demonoid's users is not a priority for them. Demonoid came back online in April 2008, but later became hosted in Ukraine.

=== 2015: New copyright law comes into effect ===
Starting on January 2, Canadian law started requiring that Internet Service Providers forward emails alleging copyright infringement to the person whose IP address is mentioned in the copyright claim. ISPs have not been allowed to charge the claimant for this service. Upon receiving such a notice, they must now retain the IP-account information on file for a period of 6 months or longer if the claimant were to pursue legal proceedings.

== Criticism ==
In 2009, Canada's music sales went down by 7.4%, second only to Spain, according to a report released on April 28, 2010, by the International Federation of the Phonographic Industry. The official synopsis said that "Canada, practically the only government of a developed country not to have implemented international copyright treaties agreed over a decade ago, is a major source of the world's piracy problem. A disproportionate number of illegal sites are hosted on Canadian soil".

In 2011, an excerpt of the executive summary of a report by the International Intellectual Property Alliance stated that "overall the piracy picture in Canada is at least as bleak as it was a year ago, and it is cementing its reputation as a haven where technologically sophisticated international piracy organizations can operate with virtual impunity".

Academic research such as one published in a 2012 paper by Robert Hammond (an assistant professor at North Carolina State University) however has found strong positive correlation between music piracy and music sales, and that file sharing benefits more established and popular artists but not newer and smaller artists.

== See also ==
- Bill C-32 (40th Canadian Parliament, 3rd Session)
- Bill C-60 (38th Canadian Parliament, 1st Session)
- Bill C-61 (39th Canadian Parliament, 2nd Session), a now defunct controversial Canadian copyright reform bill.
- Canadian Music Creators Coalition, group of musicians opposed to criminalizing music file-sharing
- Copyright Act of Canada
- Copyright Board of Canada
- Disk sharing
- File sharing
- File sharing timeline
- File-sharing program
- Open access in Canada (scholarly communication)
- Open Music Model
- Peer-to-peer
- Piracy
- Warez
