= An Act to amend the Copyright Act =

An Act to amend the Copyright Act may refer to one of several Canadian legislative acts:

- An Act to amend the Copyright Act (38th Canadian Parliament, 1st Session)
- An Act to amend the Copyright Act (39th Canadian Parliament, 2nd Session)
- An Act to amend the Copyright Act (40th Canadian Parliament, 3rd Session)
- An Act to amend the Copyright Act (41st Canadian Parliament, 1st Session)
