= Notice and notice =

A "notice and notice" system is used by some internet service providers (ISPs) in relation to the uploading and downloading activities of a user of a peer-to-peer file sharing network, otherwise known as "P2P". It may occur when an ISP receives notification from a rights holder to a copyrighted work that one of its subscribers is allegedly hosting or sharing infringing material. The ISP may then be required to forward the notice to the subscriber, and to monitor that subscriber's activities for a period of time. The ISP is not required to reveal the subscriber's personal information, nor does the ISP take any further steps to ensure that the allegedly infringing material is removed.

It is used primarily in Canada, where copyright legislation permits the download of copyrighted material, but makes it illegal to upload the same material. This was legislated with bill C-60 in 2005.

In contrast with the Notice and Takedown system in American law, Notice and Notice attempts to protect both parties' interests. This helps to ensure that non-infringing material is not removed under the guise of copyright protection.
