= Electronic Frontier Canada =

Canadian on-line civil rights organization

Electronic Frontier Canada (EFC) was a Canadian on-line civil rights organization founded to ensure that the principles embodied in the Canadian Charter of Rights and Freedoms remain protected as new computing, communications, and information technologies are introduced into Canadian society. As of 2005, the organization is no longer active.

EFC was founded in January, 1994 and later became incorporated under the Canada Corporations Act as a Federal non-profit corporation. The letters patent was submitted December 29, 1994, and recorded on January 18, 1995. EFC is not formally affiliated with the Electronic Frontier Foundation (EFF), which is based in San Francisco, although it shares many of their goals about which the groups communicate from time to time. EFC is focused on issues directly affecting Canadians, whereas the EFF has a clear American focus.

Briefly, EFC's mandate is to conduct research into issues and promote public awareness in Canada regarding the application of the Charter of Rights and Freedoms to new computer, communication, and information technologies, such as the Internet. The aim is protect freedom of expression and the right to privacy in cyberspace.

As of 2011, has included a submission to the Canadian government concerning the Internet service provider wiretapping legislation reforms known as the Lawful Access proposals, and intervention in the BMG Canada Inc. and others v. Doe and others file-sharing case, where the Federal Court of Canada and the Federal Court of Appeal refused to allow the Canadian Recording Industry Association and several major record labels from obtaining the subscriber information of ISP customers alleged to have been infringing copyright.

The EFC appears to have been inactive since 2004 (based on the last updates to their website).

== Similar Organizations ==
- OpenMedia.ca
- Online Rights Canada
