= Copyright Modernization Act =

2012 Canadian law

Parliament of Canada
- Long title: An Act to amend the Copyright Act
- Citation: S.C. 2012, c. 20
- Territorial extent: Canada
- Considered by: House of Commons of Canada
- Passed: 18 June 2012
- Considered by: Senate of Canada
- Passed: 29 June 2012
- Royal assent: 29 June 2012
- Commenced: 7 November 2012

Legislative history

Initiating chamber: House of Commons of Canada
- Bill citation: C-11, 41st Parliament, 1st Session
- Introduced by: Minister of Industry and Minister of State (Agriculture) Christian Paradis
- First reading: 29 September 2011
- Second reading: 13 February 2012
- Third reading: 18 June 2012

Revising chamber: Senate of Canada
- First reading: 18 June 2012
- Second reading: 21 June 2012
- Third reading: 29 June 2012

Summary
- Legislative Summary
- Status: In force

The Copyright Modernization Act (French: Loi sur la modernisation du droit d’auteur), also known as Bill C-11, was introduced in the House of Commons of Canada on September 29, 2011 by Industry Minister Christian Paradis. It was virtually identical to the government's previous attempt to amend the Copyright Act, Bill C-32. Despite receiving unanimous opposition from all other parties, the Conservative Party of Canada was able to pass the bill due to their majority government. The bill received Royal Assent on June 29, 2012 becoming the first update to the Copyright Act since 1997.

The Act's anti-circumvention provisions have been called "the most restrictive in the world" and student groups compared it to the controversial Stop Online Piracy Act that was proposed in the United States. Ottawa lawyer Kathleen Simmons stated "If we take out the digital lock provisions, the bill appears to be very balanced. It introduces some additional protection for different rights holders and performers but it’s also introducing a lot of user-friendly exceptions." After the Copyright Modernization Act passed, debates over its digital lock provisions continued in House discussions on Bill C-56, the Combating Counterfeit Products Act.

== Content ==
The Act contained many significant provisions. It:

- Makes explicit allowance for time shifting, format shifting and backup copies as long as no digital locks are involved.
- Expands the scope of fair dealing to include education, satire, and parody which enables users to make use of fragments of copyrighted works if no digital locks are involved.
- Introduces a new exception for user-generated content created using copyrighted works without digital locks.
- Prohibits the circumvention of digital locks, even for personal use, with some limited exceptions (such as unlocking cell phones).
- Limits the amount of statutory damages for cases of non-commercial infringement to between $100 and $5,000 for all infringements in a single proceeding for all works. Statutory damages for commercial infringement range from $500 to $20,000 per work infringed.
- Adopts a "notice-and-notice" regime which requires ISPs to forward any notice alleging infringement received from copyright owners to the subscribers in question.
- Allows an educational institution or a person acting under its authority to reproduce a work, or do any other necessary act, in order to display it.
- Allows libraries to reproduce works in its permanent collection in alternate formats if the original format is obsolete, or if the technology required to use the original is no longer available.
- Requires educational institutions to ensure that copyrighted course materials are destroyed 30 days after the end of said course.
- Requires libraries to place a five-day time limit on material borrowed electronically.
- Makes performers and photographers the primary owners of their commissioned works.
- Calls for a review of copyright law every five years.

== Reaction ==
=== From industry ===
During its consideration, the bill drew negative reactions from the US-based International Intellectual Property Alliance, which represents industries in movie, music, and software. In particular, the IIPA took issue with the "notice-and-notice" approach that only requires internet service providers to forward infringement notices to their subscribers, which it claims "fails to provide meaningful incentives for network service providers to co-operate with copyright owners to deal with copyright infringements that take place in the digital network environment". and said it will urge the U.S government to pressure Canada for more reforms as part of the negotiations for Canada's entry into Trans Pacific Partnership free trade agreement. It also wanted Canada to repeal sections that limit statutory damages to a maximum of $5,000 for non-commercial infringement, claiming that the cap renders statutory damages "ineffective in achieving its goals of full compensation and deterrence in the online environment".

CRIA lawyer Barry Sookman who supported the Act commented on the digital lock rules. He claimed that they did not actually criminalize everyday activities and that critics were misinterpreting them.

=== From the public ===
Richard Stallman joins the protest by promoting a political cartoon criticizing Bill C-11 on the blog of fellow copyright reform advocate Michael Geist.

When the Act was introduced, it was criticized for "mirroring the previous bill" and bringing back anti-circumvention laws unchanged. These laws were challenged by Liberal and NDP members whose amendments were rejected in the first and second readings. During the third reading, the Bloc Québécois' André Bellavance and the Green Party's Elizabeth May proposed amendments that were also turned down. Critics who wanted more consultation expressed concern over the committee stage which excluded any witnesses who commented on Bill C-32. Law professor Michael Geist disputed the party's statements regarding how many Canadians they consulted as well as a claim by Christian Paradis and James Moore that the Copyright Act had not changed since before 1990. During the reading of the bill in the Senate, Geist delivered testimony which led to Senator Wilfred Moore proposing amendments similar to those that were rejected in the House. These were defeated and the bill passed later that same day.

In addition to online protests, a street protest was held in Montreal. Toward the end of the bill's consideration, a petition urging the government to make further changes was signed by more than 70 arts and culture organizations.

I will give an example to show just how boneheaded the digital lock provisions are. If a journalist on the evening news wanted to show an excerpt from a movie that was being discussed or debated, the journalist would not be able to show that excerpt because he or she would have to break the digital lock to do it.

— Charlie Angus on October 18, 2011

During debates, the extent to which the government understood the technology was questioned. On October 18, 2011, Industry Minister Christian Paradis incorrectly stated that most DVDs do not have digital locks. On October 27, 2011, Conservative MP Lee Richardson in a letter used the line "If a digital lock is broken for personal use, it is not realistic that the creator would choose to file a law suit against the consumer, due to legal fees and time involved". Referring to this, Liberal MP Geoff Regan commented on the irony of the government advising Canadians to break its own law. On June 25, 2012, it was revealed that the Department of Justice had warned Industry Canada that prohibitions against the circumvention of locks may violate freedom of expression and/or disability rights in the Canadian Charter of Rights and Freedoms.

== See also ==
- Anti-Counterfeiting Trade Agreement (ACTA)
- Bill C-60 (38th Canadian Parliament, 1st Session)
- Bill C-61 (39th Canadian Parliament, 2nd Session)
- Bill C-32 (40th Canadian Parliament, 3rd Session)
- Canadian Copyright Act
- DADVSI
- Digital Millennium Copyright Act (DMCA)
- Protection of Broadcasts and Broadcasting Organizations Treaty
