= CMCC (disambiguation) =

CMCC may refer to:

- Canadian Memorial Chiropractic College
- Canadian Music Creators Coalition
- Central Maine Community College
- China Mobile Communications Corporation
- Euro-Mediterranean Center on Climate Change, Italy
- Civil-Military Coordination Center, Israel
- Craig McCracken, American animator
