= Digital Copyright Act =

The Digital Copyright Act (DCA) is a proposed United States copyright law that amends revision of Digital Millennium Copyright Act (DMCA).

The proposed law introduces the term "notice and stay down" for service providers. It requires them to take measures to prevent material that has already been determined to be violating copyright to be re-uploaded by users. While the draft was praised by the entertainment industry, free speech advocacy groups feared the language would require services to employ automatic filtering and would further limit freedom of expression.

Currently a draft, the bill is planned to be introduced to Congress by Senator Thom Tillis.
