= Bill C-32: An Act to amend the Copyright Act =

Proposed Canadian federal law

Legislative history
- Bill citation: Bill C-32
- Introduced by: Tony Clement and James Moore
- First reading: June 2, 2010
- Second reading: November 5, 2010
- Status: Not passed

Bill C-32: An Act to amend the Copyright Act (French: Projet de loi C-32 modifiant la Loi sur le droit d'auteur) was a bill introduced in the House of Commons in 2010 by the Conservative government of Prime Minister Stephen Harper. The ministers responsible were Minister of Industry Tony Clement and Minister of Canadian Heritage James Moore. This bill served as the successor to the previously proposed but short-lived Bill C-61 in 2008 and sought to tighten Canadian copyright laws regarding digital intellectual property. In March 2011, the 40th Canadian Parliament was dissolved, with all the bills which had not passed by that point (including Bill C-32) automatically dying on the order paper.

Many restrictions in the bill were harshly criticized, especially those restricting the circumvention of digital locks. Law professor Michael Geist commented that the bill was introduced by an "out-of-touch Moore, who has emerged as a staunch advocate for a Canadian DMCA". After Bill C-32's introduction, James Moore responded to criticism by calling the bill's detractors "radical extremists". In the aftermath of the bill, the United States diplomatic cables leak revealed ongoing pressure from US officials wanting Canada to pass stricter copyright laws.

The bill was revived in the next Parliament as Bill C-11, the Copyright Modernization Act, on September 29, 2011.

== Content ==
The bill would have criminalized the act of circumventing, or making available to the public the ability to circumvent, digital rights management software locks. These restrictions were described as "arguably worse than those found in the U.S." While explicit mentions of "videocassettes" in Bill C-61 were replaced with technology neutral terms, the copying of DRM encumbered media such as DVDs was still prohibited by Bill C-32. Bill C-32 was also interpreted as banning the user of region-free DVD players. According to CBC News, the bill would have criminalized "websites designed to encourage violation and piracy". When describing the main principle of the bill, Michael Geist said "anytime a digital lock is used – whether on books, movies, music, or electronic devices – the lock trumps virtually all other rights."

Bill C-32 called for a mandatory review of copyright law every five years. It would have introduced two clauses that had not been seen in previous Canadian legislation: an exception that allowed unlocking cell phones, and a "YouTube exception" permitting compilations of copyrighted works as long as they had no digital locks. Under the bill, libraries that loaned materials electronically would have been required to make those copies self-destruct within five days. Schools offering online course materials would have been obligated to render those materials inaccessible thirty days after the course's end date. Performers and photographers were set to receive greater control over reproductions of their works.

Bill C-32 sought to subject internet service providers to a "notice and notice" obligation, which would have required accusations of copyright infringement to be forwarded to the subscribers being accused, and information about them kept for a period of time. The bill proposed to limit statutory damages to $5,000 in the case of non-commercial infringement, compared to the previous maximum damages of $20,000 that did not distinguish between commercial and non-commercial.

== Reaction ==
Many Canadians criticized the bill's attempts to follow American-style copyright law, including Michael Geist who called it "flawed but fixable". Since many rights that would be granted by Bill C-32 were nullified by the digital lock protection, CIPPIC referred to the bill as "a case of Jekyll and Hyde". Artists and consumers both asked for further consultation on the bill, stating that it would infringe on the right of private citizens to transfer something they own to another medium, and that the prohibition against circumventing corporate software designed to lock users out would hamper research. After interviewing several copyright lawyers on Bill C-32, the Financial Post concluded that "ultimately, most lawyers suggest that the fair dealing definitions and exceptions should be broadened and consumers should have the right to break digital locks for personal use."

Among groups who opposed Bill C-32 were the Canadian Consumer Initiative and the Documentary Organization of Canada. Charlie Angus of the NDP stated that "the only rights you will get under this bill are those that U.S.-based entertainment concerns decide you get." SOCAN and the Canadian Music Creators Coalition criticized Bill C-32 for not doing enough to compensate artists and the Quebec Bar Association opposed the bill on the grounds that it would create an unnecessary amount of litigation. A protest was held in Calgary on June 27, 2010 citing environmental reasons as well. Some groups such as the Canadian Library Association and the Business Coalition for Balanced Copyright generally supported the bill but took issue with DRM circumvention being illegal for personal use.

Heritage Minister James Moore drew particular criticism when on June 22, 2010, he warned conference attendees about "radical extremists" who "oppose copyright reform" and suggested that they be confronted on social media. The speech was originally set to contain an admission that Bill C-61 was too restrictive in its protections of digital locks. The specific individual vilified in Moore's speech was widely considered to be Michael Geist.

== See also ==
- Anti-Counterfeiting Trade Agreement (ACTA)
- Bill C-60: An Act to amend the Copyright Act
- Bill C-61 (39th Canadian Parliament, 2nd Session)
- Bill C-11 (41st Canadian Parliament, 1st Session)
- Copyright Act
- DADVSI
- Digital Millennium Copyright Act (DMCA)
- Protection of Broadcasts and Broadcasting Organizations Treaty
