= UKUUG =

UKUUG is the UK's Unix and Open Systems User Group a non-profit organization and technical forum for the advocacy of open systems, particularly Unix and Unix-like operating systems, the promotion of Free and Open Source Software (FOSS), and the advancement of open programming standards and networking protocols.

In 2010 the name has been changed to FLOSS UK, along with a change of web domain.

== See also ==
- EFF
- FSF
- Online Rights Canada
