= Robert A. Blair =

Canadian justice

Robert A. Blair is a non resident member arbitrator and mediator at Arbitration place, and Chair of the Copyright Board of Canada. Blair retired as justice of the Court of Appeal for Ontario in October 2017, after fourteen years. He is a graduate of the University of Toronto Faculty of Law and was previously appointed to the Ontario Superior Court of Justice.
