= Online Rights Canada =

Online Rights Canada was a grassroots campaign to help notify the public on technology and informational policy issues and help the public notify their MPs about controversial proposals. It was launched with the support of the US-based Electronic Frontier Foundation (EFF) and the Canadian Internet Policy and Public Interest Clinic (CIPPIC). and had listings of how to contact local Canadian MPs to voice concern or support on policies and proposals. The Online Rights Canada website appears to no longer exist and the current site content does not reflect the organization or its efforts.

Online Rights Canada was part of a coalition against controversial proposed copyright legislation in Canada known as Bill C-61.

== See also ==
- Electronic Frontier Canada
- OpenMedia.ca
- Pirate Party of Canada
- Switzerland (software)
