= Copyright Act (Canada) =

Canadian federal copyright law

The Copyright Act (French: Loi sur le droit d’auteur) is the federal statute governing copyright law in Canada. It is jointly administered by the Department of Industry Canada and the Department of Canadian Heritage. The Copyright Act was first passed in 1921 and substantially amended in 1988 and 1997. Several attempts were made between 2005 and 2011 to amend the Act, but each of the bills (Bill C-60 in 2005, Bill C-61 in 2008, and Bill C-32 in 2010) failed to pass due to political opposition. In 2011, with a majority in the House of Commons, the Conservative Party introduced Bill C-11, titled the Copyright Modernization Act. Bill C-11 was passed and received Royal Assent on June 29, 2012.

== History ==
=== 1921 Canadian Copyright Act ===
The first Copyright Act was passed in 1921 and came into force in 1924. Although Canada was no longer subject to imperial copyright law, the 1921 Act was closely modelled on the UK Copyright Act 1911 to comply with the Berne Convention for the Protection of Literary and Artistic Works. The government wished to include a provision allowing the government to print any book, with royalties paid to the author, which was not officially licensed within the country. Lobby groups objected to this with claims that it would not satisfy the Berne Convention obligations and the language was removed.

Until 1988 the Copyright Act saw only minor amendments while the Government of Canada engaged in a number of studies on copyright reform. New technological developments and the emergence of computers, photocopiers and recording devices led to a recognition that copyright law needed to be updated. Between 1954 and 1960 the Royal Commission on Patents, Copyright, and Industrial Design, known as the Ilsley Commission, published a series of reports. Its brief was "to enquire as to whether federal legislation relating in any way to patents of invention, industrial designs, copyright and trademarks affords reasonable incentive to invention and research, to the development of literary and artistic talents, to creativeness, and to making available to the Canadian public scientific, technical, literary and artistic creations and other adaptations, applications and uses, in a manner and on terms adequately safeguarding the paramount public interest."

=== Reform in 1988 and 1997 ===
In 1977, the Government of Canada's Department of Consumer and Corporate Affairs published the Keyes-Brunet Report, a working paper with the full title "Copyright in Canada: Proposals for Revision of the Law". In 1984, the Government of Canada published "From Gutenberg to Telidon: A White Paper on Copyright" and in 1985 the House of Commons' Standing Committee on Communications and Culture published "A Charter of Rights for Creators - Report of the Subcommittee on the Revision of Copyright". A copyright reform process was initiated in two phases: Phase one was started in 1988 and saw several amendments to the original Copyright Act of 1921. Computer programs were included as works protected under copyright, the extent of moral rights was clarified, the provision for a compulsory licence for the reproduction of musical works was removed, new licensing arrangements were established for orphan works in cases where the copyright owner could not be identified, and rules were enacted on the formation of copyright collecting societies and their supervision by a reformed Copyright Board of Canada.

Phase two of the reform took place in 1997 and saw the Copyright Act amended with a new remuneration right for producers and performers of sound recordings when their work was broadcast or publicly performed by radio stations and public places such as bars. A private copying levy was introduced on blank audio tapes used for private copying and exclusive book distributors were granted protection in Canada. New copyright exceptions were introduced for nonprofit educational institutions, libraries, museums, broadcasters, and people with disability, allowing them to copy copyrighted works in specific circumstances without the permission of the copyright owner or the need to pay royalties. Damages payable for copyright infringement and the power to grant injunctions were increased, and the 1997 reforms introduced a mandatory review of the Copyright Act.

=== Bills to amend the Copyright Act ===
==== Bill C-60 ====
In June 2005, the Government of Canada introduced Bill C-60 to amend the Copyright Act. Bill C-60 sought to extend moral rights to performers of other people's works and repeal the photographer exception allowing people to gain de facto authorship of anything they photograph. The bill also proposed to make circumventing rights management schemes an offence, but mostly when done for the purpose of violating another right. The bill was never passed into law as Parliament was dissolved after a motion of non-confidence was passed in November 2005.

==== Bill C-61 ====
In summer 2008, the Government of Canada introduced Bill C-61 in their continuing effort to update the Copyright Act, with numerous similarities to the previous Bill C-60 and the American DMCA. Industry Minister Jim Prentice introduced the bill to improve compliance with WIPO treaties. It was heavily criticized and praised by conflicting sides, of being too harsh and setting up "police states", to being needed copyright reform. The bill died on the order paper due to the September 7, 2008, election call.

==== Bill C-32 ====
On June 2, 2010, Bill C-32 was tabled by federal Industry Minister Tony Clement, full title An Act to Amend the Copyright Act. While many aspects of the bill changed with respect to Bill C-61, those portions regarding legal protection of technological protection measures remained fundamentally unchanged. These measures were criticised by consumer groups, including the Consumers Council of Canada, the Public Interest Advocacy Centre, Option consommateurs and Union des consommateurs; via the Canadian Consumer Initiative, they sent a letter to Heritage Minister James Moore, who had stated in the House of Commons that consumer interests were represented by the Canadian Chamber of Commerce, noting that the Canadian Chamber of Commerce "is a business lobby group that in no way represents consumer interests, and in fact opposes the position of consumer groups on copyright policy". In April 2011, before the bill could be passed, the government lost the confidence of the House of Commons and an election was called.

==== Bill C-11 ====
On September 29, 2011, Bill C-11 was introduced into Canadian 41st Parliament by the federal Industry Minister Christian Paradis with the short title Copyright Modernization Act The bill is virtually identical to Bill C-32 from the previous Parliament which did not pass due to the dissolution of Parliament. Most of the opposition to the Bill from the opposition parties, in particular the NDP's opposition is about two aspects: The fact that it is prohibited to circumvent digital locks even for lawful purposes and henceforth all the fair dealing rights in the bill can easily be removed by the usage of such a digital lock, and the missing compensation of creators of works through a scheme similar to the one used in the past that puts a levy on recording media at the time of sale of such blank media. On June 18, 2012, the bill received its third and final reading; receiving unanimous Conservative support and unanimous opposition by Liberal and NDP members of parliament. The bill received Royal Assent on June 29, 2012, with all amendments rejected.

==== Bill C-4 ====
Bill C-4, the Canada–United States–Mexico Agreement Implementation Act, received first reading on January 29, 2020, and received Royal Assent on March 13, 2020. The bill amended numerous other acts in order to fulfill Canada's obligations under the Canada-United-States-Mexico Agreement (CUSMA). The amendments to the Copyright Act changed the term of copyright for anonymous and pseudonymous works, sound recordings, and non-dramatic cinematographic works. It also created a new category of infringement related to the deletion or alteration of rights management information. These amendments to the Copyright Act came into force on July 1, 2020.

== Provisions of the Copyright Act ==
=== Rights granted ===
Copyright grants the sole and exclusive right to create and recreate a work whether wholly or substantially. It also includes the sole rights to:

- publish the work if unpublished
- perform the work in public
- to produce, reproduce, perform or publish any translation of the work,
- in the case of a dramatic work, to convert it into a novel or other non-dramatic work,
- in the case of a novel or other non-dramatic work, or of an artistic work, to convert it into a dramatic work, by way of performance in public or otherwise,
- in the case of a literary, dramatic or musical work, to make any sound recording, cinematograph film or other contrivance by means of which the work may be mechanically reproduced or performed,
- in the case of any literary, dramatic, musical or artistic work, to reproduce, adapt and publicly present the work as a cinematographic work,
- in the case of any literary, dramatic, musical or artistic work, to communicate the work to the public by telecommunication,
- to present at a public exhibition, for a purpose other than sale or hire, an artistic work created after June 7, 1988, other than a map, chart or plan,
- in the case of a computer program that can be reproduced in the ordinary course of its use, other than by a reproduction during its execution in conjunction with a machine, device or computer, to rent out the computer program, and
- in the case of a musical work, to rent out a sound recording in which the work is embodied,

and to authorize any such acts.

=== Originality ===
The Act provides protection for all "original literary, dramatic, musical and artistic" works. Close attention has been paid to the use of the word "original". It has been well established that the foremost requirement for the subsistence of copyright is that the work is original.

The CCH Canadian case re-evaluated the meaning of "original" and found that for a work to be original it must be the result of the exercise of "skill and judgment". More specifically: skill, meaning the "use of one's knowledge, developed an aptitude or practiced ability in producing work", and judgment, meaning the "use of one's capacity for discernment or ability to form an opinion or evaluation by comparing different possible options in producing the work". Nevertheless, originality does not require any novelty or creativity. It does require intellectual effort beyond mere mechanical exercise.

The determination of originality on the basis presented in CCH Canadian depends on the facts. For a large part, it depends on the degree to which the work originated from the author. Many factors are considered, The medium or form used is significant. Whether it comprises elements that are in the public domain or not, whether it the ordering of data or facts, or whether the form is pedestrian or novel. Mere selection is generally not enough. As well, it is significant to consider whether there are any artistic elements to it.

=== Fixation ===
Copyright provides the protection of expression of ideas. This entails that there must be a form, or "fixation", to the expression. It is fixation that distinguishes an expression from an idea.

In Canadian Admiral Corp. v. Rediffusion, the court considered fixation: "for copyright to exists in a 'work' it must be expressed to some extent at least in some material form, capable of identification and having a more or less permanent endurance." In this case, the court found that there was an insufficient fixation in the live broadcast of a sports event. Any sort of broadcast, telecast, or display of a spectacle on its own is not sufficient to be fixed. At the least, it must be simultaneously recorded in some fashion to be fixed.

To the possible exception of choreographed works, there is a requirement that the work be recorded in a relatively permanent form. Typing a note into a computer screen may be sufficiently permanent. Some cases have shown that unstructured speech or other spontaneous or improvised creations, such as a sports game, cannot contain copyright.

=== Exclusion ===
Both facts and ideas are by their very nature uncopyrightable. This will often create difficulties when it becomes necessary to separate the idea from the expression as well as in the separation of fact from the arranging and use of those facts. Where the distinction between idea and expression becomes obscured the Courts often take a precautionary view that it cannot be copyrighted so as to avoid preventing others from expressing the same idea.

Minor designs that are largely ornamental or functional are excluded as well. For example, coloured blocks used as tools in an educational program are excluded.

=== Ownership ===
The copyright of an artist's work is owned directly by the artist in most cases with the exception of engravings, photographs, portraits, and works created in the course of employment. Furthermore, these rights can be alienated through assignment and licences.

An artist's moral rights, however, are inalienable and stay with the artist their entire lives. As with copyrights, moral rights are inheritable.

=== Crown Copyright ===
Section 12 of the Copyright Act reserves copyright for all works that are "prepared or published by or under the direction or control of Her Majesty or any government department." Normally, such copyright lasts for a period of 50 years following the end of the calendar year when the work was performed or created. However, Crown copyright applies "without prejudice to any rights or privileges of the Crown". In this way it is "said to be perpetual...and not to lapse through non-use or non-assertion", although the exact extent of what is or is not covered by this "perpetual copyright" is not entirely clear in practice. As of November 18, 2013, Crown Copyright and Licensing is no longer centrally administered, and the department or agency that created the information must be contacted for specific Crown copyright information. This has resulted in varied approaches by different organisations, where "the non-commercial licence has disappeared from the Public Works and Government Services site and it is unclear whether it remains active", and where "some departments have denied permission or asserted crown copyright to take down content". One example of Crown copyright being applied beyond the 50 year expiration mark is the 1921 design of the Arms of Canada, and its 1957 revision, which "may not be reproduced, whether for commercial or non-commercial purposes".

=== Music recordings ===
The music industry created a loophole in Canadian copyright laws when it asked for a levy on blank audio media. Since 1999, these private copying levies on blank audio recording media (such as audio cassettes, CDs and CD-Rs) have raised millions of dollars for songwriters, recording artists, music publishers and record companies who partake in the industry system. In exchange, and subject to certain exceptions, the act of copying music onto an audio recording medium for the private use of the person who makes the copy does not constitute copyright infringement. Also, the statutory private copying provision is silent as to whether the person doing the private copying must also be the owner of the music being copied.

Some argue that the private copying levy legalized copying in the digital age, to the consternation of the music industry. However, Canadian courts have not extended the definition of "audio recording medium" to exempt music copied onto computer hard drives, digital audio recorders (such as iPods or MP3 players), or other types of permanently embedded memory.

=== Foreign works ===
Section 5 of the Copyright Act applies copyright protection to all citizens, residents, and corporations of Berne Convention, Universal Copyright Convention and World Trade Organization countries. The status is determined at the time the work is created or published. The section also permits the Minister of Industry to certify that these rights are extended to other countries. These are listed in the Regulations

=== Copyright terms ===
Up until December 31, 2022, copyright of a work by an author was limited to 50 years from the end of the calendar year of death. As of January 1, 2023, this was changed to 70 years from the end of the calendar year of death. Any author who died in 1971 or before means that all their work was in the public domain. For authors who died in 1972 this was changed to 70 years from the end of the calendar year of death. The law was not made retroactive which means that any author who entered the public domain stays in the public domain. Authors who died in 1972 will not become public domain until 2043. Except if the work is a cinematographic work in which case it's 70 years from the year in which the work is made. However, if the cinematographic work is published before copyright expires, the copyright continues until the earlier of the end of 75 years past the year of publication and 100 past the year in which it was made.

The same rules apply for books with two or more authors, but in order to be public domain, all the authors must meet the criteria. In other words, the book's public domain eligibility relies on the date of death of the author who dies last.

=== Unknown or anonymous authors ===
Where the identity of the author is unknown (if the author is anonymous or pseudonymous) then the copyright lasts for either 50 years from the publication of the work or 75 years from the making of the work, whichever is shorter. However, if author's identity becomes commonly known during this time, the term provided in section 6 applies. The act also makes provisions for posthumous works.

=== Orphaned works ===
The Copyright Act allows anyone who seeks permission to use a copyright-protected work but cannot locate the copyright owner to apply to the Copyright Board ("the Board") for a licence to use that work. Works that are published or fixed (as the case may be) are eligible for a licence. The four categories are eligible material are:

- A published work (e.g. a book)
- A published sound recording (e.g. a single from a previously released album)
- A fixation of a performer's performance (e.g. the video recording of a live concert)
- A fixation of a communication signal (e.g. a recorded broadcast of a hockey game)

The Board can only issue a licence to works that are copyright-protected. If a work is not within the scope of copyright protection (e.g. a book containing only facts) or the copyright of the work is expired, the Board will not issue a licence since none would be required. Before the Board can issue a licence, the applicant must demonstrate that reasonable efforts have been made to locate the copyright owner and the copyright owner cannot be located. The Board takes many factors into consideration in determining what a "reasonable" effort entails. For example, the Board will take into account whether the proposed use is commercial, whether the work's author is still living, and whether information about ownership could be found in publicly available records.

The Board can issue a licence for any rights belonging to the copyright owner. Any use that is not within the copyright owner's rights will not be issued a licence since none would be required. For example, no licence will be granted to copy an insubstantial portion of a work because it is not a use that is protected by copyright.

Any particular licence will be specified to the needs of the applicant. For example, if the applicant asks for the authorization to distribute a film, the licence will read accordingly. Licences can also include permission to sub-license. For example, a film distribution licence can allow the licensee to enter into an agreement with a sub-distributor, provided the sub-distributor proceeds on the same terms as those set out in the licence.

If the Board decides to grant an application for a licence, it must also set appropriate terms and conditions for that licence. Generally, the licence will be valid only in Canada, for a specified amount of time, and involves a reasonable royalty payment (either upfront to a collective society or to an owner if one emerges). Sometimes, the licence will also contain attribution obligations, requiring the licensee to indicate: the name of the author, that the use is carried out pursuant to a licence obtained from the Board, and how the owner might obtain compensation for the use made.

According to their website, the Board granted 217 licences and rejected 8 applications between 1990 and 2013. Rejections were usually because no licence was required, or because the applicant had not proven that the work had been published (only published works are eligible for a licence). Although 217 licences had been granted, the number of works implicated is likely much larger. A 2009 study revealed that the 421 applications filed to date pertained to roughly 12,640 different works (a collection of orphan works would commonly proceed under a single application). The study also found that many applications were withdrawn or abandoned because the copyright owner was found with the help of the Board or a collective society.

=== Photographs ===
As with other works, the copyright duration for a photograph is the life of the author plus 50 years. Until June 2012, the copyright owner of an engraving, photograph or portrait was considered to be the person who ordered the work once payment was made. The Copyright Modernization Act repealed s. 13(2) such that the copyright is no longer held by the commissioner. Subject to a contract that says otherwise, the owner is now the photographer and the commissioner is granted limited rights to display and transmit the photograph without his or her permission.

== Penalties ==
According to section 34(4) of the Copyright Act, specific penalties will be decided by the court. Section 35(1) states that an infringer is liable for the financial gain made through infringement, and "such damages to the owner of the copyright as the owner has suffered due to the infringement" A copyright holder can instead elect to protect his/her copyright under section 38.1, which allows for "a sum of not less than $100 or more than $5,000 as the court considers just." for all non-commercial infringement, and $500 up to $20,000 for each commercial infringement.

In addition to the civil penalties described above, Section 42(1) of the Copyright Act sets out a number of criminal offences. These primarily deal with infringement that involves sale or rental of copyrighted materials, and can result in fines of up to $1,000,000 or prison sentences of up to 2 years for indictment. For a summary conviction, the maximum fine is $25,000 and prison term is limited to 6 months.

According to Section 44 of the Copyright Act, copyright owners may apply to have copies of their work that, were they made in Canada would be infringing, and are about to be, or have been, imported into Canada dealt with by the Canada Border Services Agency. In these cases, such copies can be detained, and eventually destroyed or handed over to the copyright holder, at the discretion of the court.

== See also ==
- Fair dealing in Canadian copyright law
- File sharing in Canada
- Defences in Canadian copyright law
- Limitations on copyrightability in Canadian copyright law
