= Luc Martineau =

Canadian judge

The Honourable Luc Martineau

Judge of the Federal Court
- Incumbent
- Assumed office July 2, 2003
- Appointed by: Jean Chrétien
- Monarch: Elizabeth II
- Prime Minister: Jean Chrétien

Personal details
- Education: University of Ottawa (LL.L.), (LL.M.)

Luc Martineau is a Canadian judge currently serving on the Canadian Federal Court.

== Education ==
Luc Martineau attended the University of Ottawa earning his Licentiate of Laws degree in 1977 and his Master of Laws degree in 1978.
In 1978, he was called to the Bar of Québec.

== Early career ==
From 1979 through 1981 Martineau worked as legal counsel for the President of the Canada Labour Relations Board, until he received a position as an associate at the firm Robert, Dansereau, Barré, Marchessault and Lauzon. Martineau subsequently became a partner at the firm, and worked there until 1990. That year, Martineau transferred to be a partner at the firm Langlois Robert, where he remained for six years.

In 1996, Martineau left Langlois Robert to create his own firm in Montreal that offered legal, arbitration, and mediation services.

== Judicial career ==
On January 25, 2002, Martineau was appointed as a judge on the trial division of the Federal Court of Canada and became, ex officio, a member of the Federal Court of Appeal. On 18 April of the same year, he became a judge on the Court Martial Appeal Court of Canada. On 2 July 2003, as per the Courts Administration Service Act, the Federal Court of Canada and other Canadian federal court branches were reorganized and Justice Martineau was re-appointed as a judge of the Federal Court.

=== Special Appointments ===
On June 27, 2007 Justice Martineau was appointed as a member of the Public Servants Disclosure Protection Tribunal, which was responsible for reviewing claims of reprisal from whistleblowers and taking appropriate actions based on the claims. Three years later, Justice Martineau was appointed president of the tribunal.
On October 2, 2020 Justice Martineau was appointed to the position of Chairman of the Copyright Board of Canada, for a period of five years, which was extended to 2027 in 2025.
