= Bill C-61: An Act to amend the Copyright Act =

Proposed Canadian federal law

Legislative history
- Bill citation: Bill C-61: An Act to amend the Copyright Act
- Introduced by: Jim Prentice and Josée Verner
- First reading: June 12, 2008
- Status: Not passed

Bill C-61: An Act to amend the Copyright Act (French: Projet de loi C-61 modifiant la Loi sur le droit d'auteur) was a bill introduced by the Conservative government of Prime Minister Stephen Harper in 2008. The bill died on the Order Paper when the 39th Parliament was dissolved and an election was called on September 7, 2008. In its 2008 election platform, the Conservative Party promised to reintroduce a bill containing the content of C-61 if reelected.

The bill was the successor to Bill C-60, which had been proposed in the previous Parliament by the Liberal government of Prime Minister Paul Martin. Specifically, the Conservative government stated that the bill was intended to meet Canada's WIPO treaty obligations. Bill C-61 attracted widespread criticism from critics who stated that it did not strike a fair balance between the rights of copyright holders and consumers. There was also confusion between C-61 and the Anti-Counterfeiting Trade Agreement which also had significant copyright implications for Canada.

Minister of Industry Jim Prentice stated that the bill would "expressly allow you to record TV shows for later viewing; copy legally purchased music onto other devices, such as MP3 players or cell phones; make back-up copies of legally purchased books, newspapers, videocassettes and photographs onto devices you own". However, the bill would have made it illegal to circumvent DRM technologies effectively rendering the rights granted useless for DRM protected digital media.

This bill was superseded by Bill C-32 introduced on June 2, 2010.

== Content ==
The proposed bill contained the following changes on what constituted copyright infringement and what did not for personal use.

Time shifting, limited format shifting, copying for personal use, and device transferring of media would be permitted but with significant limitations. Copies of shows and videocassettes could be made but would not be allowed to involve DVDs, shows with a "no recording flag" or any other format encumbered by "digital locks". Additionally, a transfer of media would be allowed only once per device owned by the purchaser of the original copy. The bill also would give rightsholders the autonomy of imposing additional clauses on the consumer (e.g. Amazon's non-transferability clause, promotional use only, do not sell/transfer, etc.). Format shifting was required to comply with an additional twelve processes (pdf).

Hosts, such as ISPs, would be absolved of legal responsibility in the event of their services being unintentionally used to provide access to copyrighted material. Methods of protecting subscriber privacy would have become legal under the proposed bill, however, the distribution of software to do so would have been illegal, effectively cancelling out the right.

The bill would have made circumventing all digital locks illegal, including locks on the Internet. It would have modified what libraries could do in providing digital copies, such that they would have been allowed to create digital copies for patrons, but the copies would have had to self-destruct or be destroyed within five days of creation.

Bill C-61 would have modified the copyrights of performers and their performances giving the performer the sole right to:

- "communicate [his or her performance] to the public by telecommunication."
- "perform [his or her performance] in public."
- fix his or her performance in material form, such as by recording it onto a DVD.
- reproduce, rent, sell or otherwise transfer ownership of any sound recording of his or her performance.

The bill proposed a fine of $500 for music downloads. Since this was not made to apply in other cases, fines of $20,000 per instance defined in previous bills were understood to apply to new offences criminalized by Bill C-61. These included: circumventing digital locks or DRM regardless of reason/intent, uploading copyrighted material regardless of awareness or "making available" copyrighted material regardless of whether it was actually uploaded. In the case of commercial circumvention of DRM, clause 32 of the bill specified penalties of a maximum of $1,000,000 and/or five years imprisonment on conviction on indictment, or a maximum of $25,000 and/or six months imprisonment on summary conviction.

== Confusion with Anti-Counterfeiting Trade Agreement ==
There was confusion between Bill C-61 and ACTA, evident by letters sent by Jim Prentice detailing that no border checks were to occur. The proposed border checks are part of ACTA, not Bill C-61.

== Reaction ==
A poll using the following question resulted in 45% of the population against, and 45% of the population in favour of the question.

As you may know, the federal government has proposed amendments to the Copyright Act, which include introducing a $500 fine for people caught downloading copyrighted material from the Internet, and a fine of up to $20,000 for people who hack digital locks or upload copyrighted material to file-sharing websites. From what you have heard, seen or read, do you support or oppose the proposed changes?

— Angus Reid, National Public Opinion Poll

By age, 58% of those aged 18–34 were opposed as compared with 37% of those 35-54 and only 27% of those older. The poll was criticized for not mentioning any of the anti DRM circumvention provisions and using an inaccurate definition of "hacked".

=== Support ===
Proponents of the bill, including some copyright holders in the entertainment industry, called it a much needed "assurance that [investors are] protected." They also called it a "win-win" balance between consumers and copyright holders with some pushing further asking for format shifting to be made illegal.

The MPAA and RIAA supported the proposal, as they saw it as finally bringing in Canada to WIPO standards, having lobbied/pressured hard for stricter copyright rules.

The Alliance of Canadian Cinema, Television and Radio Artists was supportive. According to Brad Keenan, Director, ACTRA Performers' Rights Society and Sound Recording Division, "the Bill not only introduces the new concept of format shifting, it is also [revises] existing rules on time-shifting. ACTRA believes that consumers should have flexibility, however, artists must be compensated for uses of their work and we don't see this part of the equation in the government releases. We would be deeply concerned if the Bill allows people to copy artists' work onto media devices like iPods without compensation for creators; and, also if existing levies and royalties are affected by this Bill." Stephen Waddell, ACTRA's National Executive Director, says it has been "more than a decade since Canada signed on to the WIPO copyright treaties," and that, "implementing these treaties as this Bill does, will bring our laws into the 21st Century." However, among the ranks, there is dissent by some ACTRA members despite the group's public stance. Jason Chesworth, a member of ACTRA on Broadcast This wrote that he, "questioned the union's position," and that he, "wholeheartedly disagree[s] with ACTRA...in fact....believe[s] that the proposed changes will become a major detriment to artists trying to create content while protecting only those at the top."

=== Criticism ===
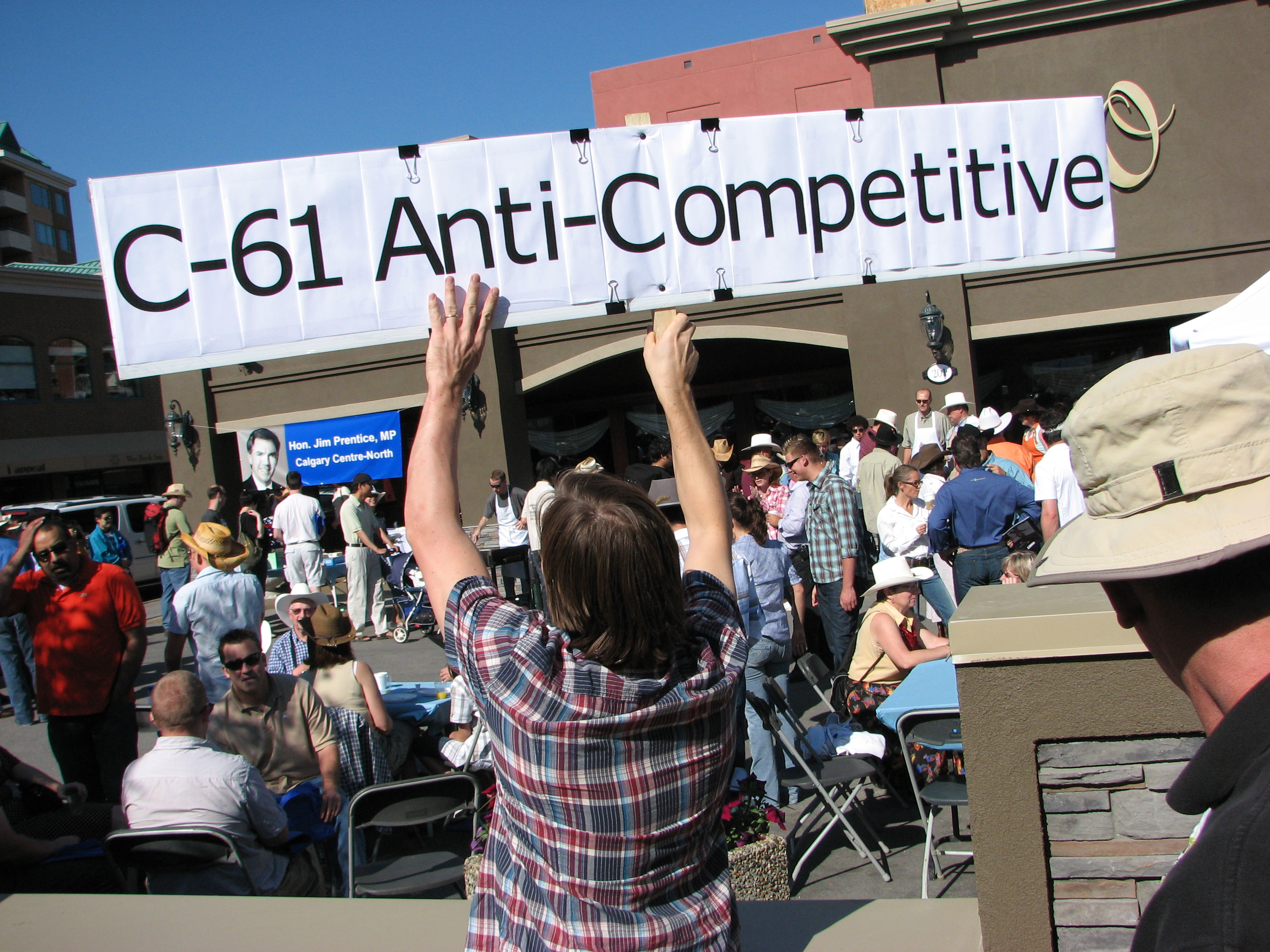
An opponent of the proposed Bill C-61 holds up a protest sign at a public breakfast event held during the Calgary Stampede by Canadian Industry Minister Jim Prentice.

Among opposition parties, Liberal MP Scott Brison, called the bill a "US-made law" that would establish a "police state." Members of the New Democratic Party including NDP Leader Jack Layton and NDP Member Charlie Angus were strongly opposed and promised to fight the bill. A substantial majority of Canadians (76%) were found to agree with the statement that the bill was drafted in the US.

As of September 29, 2008, more than 92,000 people had joined the Facebook group "Fair Copyright for Canada", started by law professor Michael Geist, to protest Bill C-61. Geist's blog became one of the leading sites for educational resources on copyright reform, and tools for constituents to contact their local Members of Parliament. Michael Geist ran a series on 61 possible reforms to Bill C-61 that would make it more palatable. In addition, the magazine ComputerWorld Canada ran its own petition drive, asking the government to amend the bill because it discourages experts and other coders from conducting innovative research.

The Canadian Software Innovation Alliance, an association of open source developers questioned the bill, because of its potentially harmful effects on open source software modification. Spokesman Bob Young, Lulu Inc's CEO (and the former CEO of Red Hat) said: "We're crafting these laws without having anyone from the technology industry engaged in the process." He contended that the bill catered too closely to the content industry and not to engineers and software developers.

Consumer groups including Option consommateurs, Consumers Council of Canada, Public Interest Advocacy Centre (PIAC), the Canadian Internet Policy and Public Interest Clinic (CIPPIC), and Online Rights Canada voiced opposition on not being consulted in the creation of the bill.

The Appropriation Art Coalition condemned the Bill saying, "copyright is meant to nurture the rights of creators, not suppress and criminalize artistic practice. It is not the responsibility of any government to legislate art."

The Canadian Association of University Teachers opposed the bill as "making it more difficult for university and college teachers and students to have access to learning and research materials". It noted that material that can be copied now in paper format would not be legally copyable in electronic format when it is digitally encrypted. James Turk, the executive director said, "This could be the effective end of fair-dealing, the right to copy and use works for purposes such as research and private study."

Some opponents, like the CIRPA and the CRIA said the bill should have focused more on commercial piracy instead, while others called into the question of the enforceability of the bill. Other copyright holders and artists, like the CMCC, spoke out against the bill in its entirety.

Others stated that the new bill would make criminals out of ordinary people who are, for example, using a multi-regional DVD player (popular for immigrants and tourists), transferring legitimate DVD media to iPods, or using various other devices. Backing up a computer that contains copyrighted material was also suspected be illegal under Bill C-61.

There was also criticism about the anti-circumvention aspect for making "technology trump whatever rights consumers or competitors might have otherwise had", in that people only have whatever rights the rights holders give them in superseding "agreements", for example, EULA, digital contracts shown when users install, download, etc.) In addition, there was criticism about the fact that purchasing songs as a gift and transferring the song onto a device owned by the gift's recipient under the new bill would have been illegal.

Editorial reviews of the bill were mostly negative or neutral. In a listing of editorials compiled by Michael Geist, there were no on-topic editorials expressing positive support for C-61. In addition, the Canadian Newspaper Association was critical of the bill, for having negative impacts on news gathering.

In late July 2008, Michael Geist criticized the bill on environmental grounds. Specific criticisms included:

- Criminalizing the unlocking of cellphones, forcing consumers to acquire a new cell phone each time they switch a carrier, creating excess waste.
- Allowing lawsuits over the legality of companies that offer to recycle printer ink cartridges.
- Creating new barriers in the race toward network-based computing, since the ICT industry accounts for more carbon emissions than the airline industry. Sites for network-based computing – often referred to as "cloud computing" – are large server farms situated near clean energy sources. The bill could prevent developments on Canada's northern high-speed optical networks with zero carbon emissions. Bill C-61 would further prohibit many uses of network-based computing such as video recording services, backup of data, etc.

The Canadian Library Association released an advocacy kit to oppose the new bill, citing concerns that the bill does not protect the public interest.

== See also ==
- Anti-Counterfeiting Trade Agreement (ACTA)
- Bill C-11 (41st Canadian Parliament, 1st Session)
- Copyright Act of Canada
- DADVSI
- Digital Millennium Copyright Act (DMCA)
- Protection of Broadcasts and Broadcasting Organizations Treaty
