= Limitations on copyrightability in Canadian copyright law =

Limitations in canadian copyright law

In Canadian copyright law there are several Limitations to Copyright. These limitations define the scope of copyright protection by placing limits on ability of copyright holders to deny other users or creators the ability to employ the ideas, facts, and concepts underlying their protected expression.

There are two major doctrinal devices employed to place limits on the scope of copyright:

- Idea-expression divide(see also the related notion of Scènes à faire)
- Merger Doctrine

== Justifications for the doctrinal limits on copyright ==
One consequence of denying the use of protected expression by means of copyright is that in the absence of some limiting doctrine copyright holders might be able to deny other users the ability not only to use their own original expression but also to deny users concepts, ideas, and facts which form the basis of the original expression. A simple example concerns the copyright of an author in a work of literature. An author who claims copyright in a specific novel can limit other users from directly reproducing the work, or copying the substance of the plot, character formation, etc... However the law of copyright will not allow the author to limit the use of, for example, the idea of traveling around a fantastical medieval land which contains fanciful creatures because to do so would limit the use of this rather stock idea to other users.

== Idea-expression divide ==
The ideas and facts vs. expression distinction in Canadian copyright law is essentially the same as that in the United States. The basic notion is that although a copyright may be present in a work it is not present in the underlying ideas.

=== Case law in Canada ===
For example, in the early case of Deeks v. Wells the Court of Appeal for Ontario blocked an infringement action where an author had provided the manuscript of a book entitled "The Web" to a publisher who later published a work using a similar premise. The court denied the infringement claim employing an analogy based on the Encyclopædia Britannica. The original author of Encyclopædia Britannica could not seek to prevent another author from compiling a chronological history based on known facts for there could be no copyright in the facts themselves or the idea of compiling a chronological history.

=== Difficulties in applying the idea-expression divide ===
As a practical matter it can often be difficult for courts to draw the line between a fact and idea on the one hand and expression on the other hand. Learned Hand is often quoted from his decision in Nichols v. Universal Pictures Corp., which concerned two plays addressing interracial and inter-religious marriages between Jewish and Irish families, in which he says the following "We assume that the plaintiff's play is altogether original, even to an extent that in fact it is hard to believe. We assume further that, so far as it has been anticipated by earlier plays of which she knew nothing, that fact is immaterial. Still, as we have already said, her copyright did not cover everything that might be drawn from her play; its content went to some extent into the public domain. We have to decide how much, and while we are as aware as any one that the line, wherever it is drawn, will seem arbitrary, that is no excuse for not drawing it; it is a question such as courts must answer in nearly all cases. Whatever may be the difficulties a priori, we have no question on which side of the line this case falls." This quote emphasizes the degree to which courts can have difficulty at the margins in deciding where ideas end and expression begins. For this reason unlike in patent law, the court has to engage in a comparative analysis of the works in question in order to determine whether an infringement is present.

== Merger doctrine ==
Merger doctrine is a simple doctrine in IP law which states that when the expression of an idea can only occur in one or a few different ways or the expression of an idea is a necessary implication of the efficient expression of the idea then the idea merges with the expression and cannot be the subject of a copyright.

=== Case law in Canada ===
The status of the merger doctrine in Canada is somewhat unclear. It is clear in the United States from cases like Rosenthal v. Kalpakian(which concerned the infringement of certain bee shaped jewellery that in the United States that there are occasions where the expression of the idea merges with the idea itself such that the expression cannot be the subject of copyright) " that merger doctrine in an integral element of the copyright regime. In Canada the Delrina cases support the existence of a merger doctrine in substance however the actual status of the doctrine as understood in the U.S. is somewhat uncertain. In Delrina II Justice of the Appeal Morden noted that the U.S. doctrine of merger had been the subject of criticism in earlier Canadian and English caselaw in particular he quoted Justice Jacob in the English case of Ibcos Computer Ltd. v. Barclays Finance Ltd. who said with respect to the American doctrine of merger, "The true position is that where an 'idea' is sufficiently general, then even if the original work embodies it, the mere taking of that idea will not infringe. But if the idea is detailed, then there may be infringement. It is a question of degree" suggesting that the doctrine of merger is inherent in the idea expression dichotomy and does not exist as an official principle of Canadian copyright law. Nonetheless in the same decision Justice Morden stated the following, "The merger notion is a natural corollary of the idea/ expression distinction which, as I have said, is fundamental in copyright law in Canada, England and the United States. Clearly, if there is only one or a very limited number of ways to achieve a particular result in a computer program, to hold that that way or ways are protectable by copyright could give the copyright holder a monopoly on the idea or function itself" suggesting that whatever apprehension the court has about the U.S. formulation of the merger doctrine a functional equivalent exists in Canada.

=== Justifications for merger doctrine ===
This doctrine was developed to prevent a copyright holder from effectively denying other users or creators the use of an idea simply because an idea cannot be expressed in another fashion. A simple example involves a list of recipe ingredients for pancake batter. The expression of the list of ingredients can only be done in a very limited number of ways. As a result, the granting copyright over the list would be to deny the use of the idea of pancake batter to other cooks. For this reason it is likely that the list of pancake batter ingredients merges with the expression of the list of ingredients such that no copyright can be present in the list.

== Scènes à faire ==
The scènes à faire doctrine states that certain elements of a creative work cannot be protected by copyright where they are mandated by or are customary to the genre.

=== Case Law in Canada ===
The scènes à faire doctrine has been applied in Canada in Preston v. 20th Century Fox Ltd., where the plaintiff argued that the popular Star Wars franchise allegedly copied the Ewoks from his 1978 literary work titled Space Pets. The Federal Court held that there was no infringement, as the similarity in setting and scenery are "standard aspects of productions concerning primitive species or primitive humans, drawn from a common pool of folklore."

== See also ==
- Nichols v. Universal Pictures Corp.
- Feist Publications v. Rural Telephone Service
- scènes à faire
- Stock character
