= Canadian Internet Policy and Public Interest Clinic =

Legal clinic focused on technology policy

- Formation: 2003; 23 years ago
- Founder: Michael Geist
- Headquarters: University of Ottawa Faculty of Law
- Website: cippic.ca

The Samuelson-Glushko Canadian Internet Policy and Public Interest Clinic (CIPPIC) is a legal clinic at the University of Ottawa focused on maintaining fair and balanced policy making in Canada related to technology. Founded in the fall of 2003 by Michael Geist, its headquarters is at the University of Ottawa Faculty of Law, Common Law Section.

== History and mission ==
CIPPIC was initially founded on a grant from an Amazon.com cy-près fund that was matched by the Ontario Research Network for Electronic Commerce. In 2007, it received a major donation from professors Robert J. Glushko and Pamela Samuelson which ensured that CIPPIC would be able to continue its operations. CIPPIC continues to operate through donations and the support of the University of Ottawa.

CIPPIC has as its mission "to fill voids in public policy debates on technology law issues, ensure balance in policy and law-making processes, and provide legal assistance to under-represented organizations and individuals on matters involving the intersection of law and technology" and "to provide a high quality and rewarding clinical legal education experience to students of law."

== Projects and initiatives ==
- June 2008 – Canadian Internet Policy and Public Interest Clinic is part of a coalition against the proposed Canadian copyright legislation known as Bill C-61. The controversial bill would strengthen the position of copyright holders with Digital Millennium Copyright Act-style provisions.
- May 2008 – CIPPIC files PIPEDA complaint against Facebook
- January 2008 – CIPPIC calls on government to establish a central, online registry of corporate data breaches.
