= Music Canada =

Trade organization in Canada

- Musique Canada
- Abbreviation: MC
- Formation: 9 April 1963; 63 years ago
- Type: Licensing and royalties, technical standards
- Headquarters: Toronto, Ontario
- Website: musiccanada.com

Music Canada is a nonprofit trade organization that was founded 9 April 1963 in Toronto to represent the interests of companies that record, manufacture, produce, and distribute music in Canada. It also offers benefits to some of Canada's leading independent record labels and distributors. It was known as the Canadian Record Manufacturer's Association (French: Association canadienne des fabricants de disques) until 1972 and the Canadian Recording Industry Association (CRIA) (French: Association de l'industrie canadienne de l'enregistrement) until 2011.

== History ==
Originally formed as the 10-member Canadian Record Manufacturer's Association, the association changed its name to Canadian Recording Industry Association (CRIA) in 1972 and opened membership to other record industry companies.

In 2006, a number of smaller labels resigned their memberships, complaining that the organization was not representing their interests. On 7 July 2011, the CRIA changed its name to Music Canada, and began offering special benefits to some of the leading independent labels and distributors.

== Organization ==
Music Canada is governed by a board of directors who are elected annually by association members. To be eligible for election a candidate for the board must be among the executive officers of the member companies. Patrick Rogers (formerly the Vice President, Corporate Affairs) was named Chief Executive Officer, effective 11 January 2021. Graham Henderson had been president from 15 November 2004 to 28 May 2020; Brian Robertson previously held the position from 1974.

- Class A members are Canadian individuals or companies whose principal business is producing, manufacturing, or marketing sound recordings. These members hold voting rights, and currently consist of the "big four" record labels.^{[D]}
- Class B members are Canadian individuals or companies whose principal business is producing sound recordings. These members pay a $600 annual membership fee but have no voting rights. As of 2007, there were 22 class B members.
- Manufacturing Division members are Canadian individuals or companies whose principal business is manufacturing sound recordings.

== Other services ==
Music Canada is responsible for the distribution of ISRC registrant codes within Canada, and also works with the IFPI and RIAA to try to prevent copyright infringement of artists' work.

== Representation ==
Historically, Music Canada has represented all record labels in the country. However, some labels and other industry groups have publicly disagreed with Music Canada and stated that it no longer represents them. In 2006, six well-known "indie" labels including Nettwerk left Music Canada in a dispute over Canadian content rules. They claimed the association was only protecting the interests of "the four major foreign multi-national labels", referring to EMI, Universal, Sony BMG, and Warner. Other points of contention include Music Canada's stance against the blank media tax, their support for digital locks on music, and positions against copyright reform. In 2007, a group of musicians formed the Canadian Music Creators Coalition, claiming "legislative proposals that would facilitate lawsuits against our fans or increase the labels' control over the enjoyment of music are made not in our names, but on behalf of the labels' foreign parent companies."

== Legal actions ==
On 16 February 2004, Music Canada applied to the Federal Court to force five major Canadian Internet service providers – Shaw Communications Inc., Telus Corp., Rogers Cable, Bell Canada's Sympatico service and Vidéotron – to release the names of 29 people accused of copyright infringement through peer-to-peer file sharing. In April 2005, Vidéotron indicated its willingness to supply customer information to Music Canada.

On 31 March 2004, in the case of BMG v. John Doe, Justice Konrad von Finckenstein of the Federal Court of Canada ruled that making music available for download over the Internet was not equivalent to distribution and was thus noninfringing. The Justice compared the peer-to-peer filesharing activities to "having a photocopier in a library room full of copyrighted material" and wrote that there was no evidence of unauthorized distribution presented. The Federal Court of Appeal upheld the lower courts ruling denying the disclosure of the customers' identities, but, in reference to "what would or would not constitute infringement of copyright", stated: "such conclusions should not have been made in the very preliminary stages of this action, since they would require a consideration of the evidence as well as the law applicable to such evidence after it has been properly adduced, and could be damaging to the parties if a trial takes place." The Copyright Board of Canada earlier that year had included downloading music in the list of "private copying" activities for which tariffs on blank media applied. (Private copying is the act of copying music for personal use from a noninfringing source, and is itself noninfringing.) In 2008, the operators of the isoHunt website filed a motion with the Supreme Court of British Columbia seeking a declaratory judgment affirming the legality of their operation. The motion was denied, and the court ruled a full trial was needed. This decision was appealed by the operators of isoHunt; the appeal was also denied. In late 2009, isoHunt filed a formal suit against Music Canada and the four "major" record labels seeking "declaratory relief to clarify its legal rights."

Additionally, in October 2008, the four main members of Music Canada were sued by the estate of Chet Baker and several other artists for copyright infringement. The major claims in this lawsuit are as follows:

- That some three hundred thousand works were illegally distributed by the Music Canada's members, and
- That they failed to seek proper licensing and distribution agreements with the creators of the aforementioned works, instead placing the works on what is colloquially referred to as a "pending list" (i.e., any payments to be made for the use of the aforementioned works are reserved, pending an agreement with the artists who created the works).

As the standard punitive damages for each act of infringement is set at $20,000, and there are three hundred thousand works on the "pending lists", Music Canada could have faced punitive damages of a minimum of $6 billion. On 8 November 2011, the suit was settled out of court for over $45 million.

== Certification awards ==
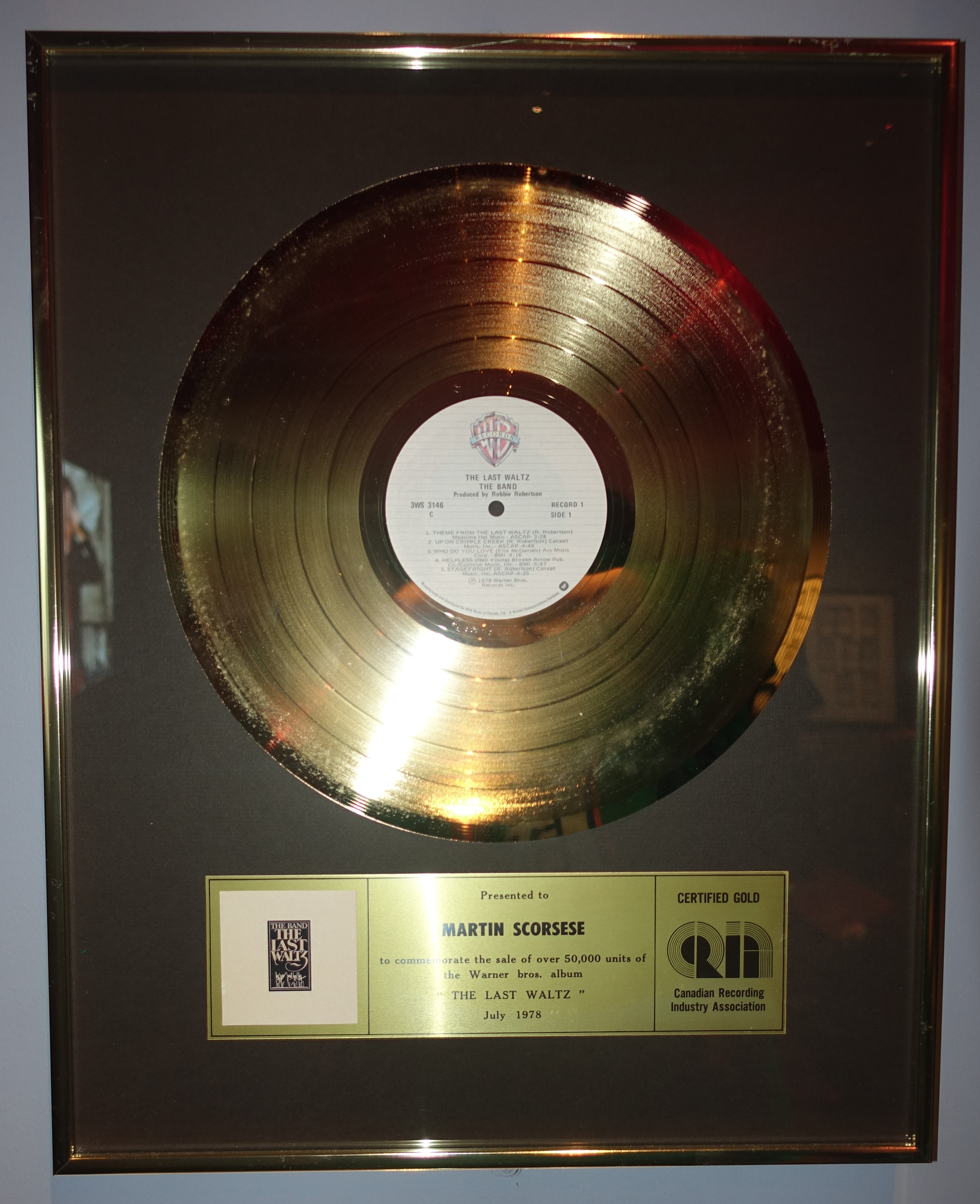
Gold disc for The Last Waltz (1978)

=== Albums ===
Certification	Releases before 1 May 2008	Releases after 1 May 2008
Gold	50,000	40,000
Platinum	100,000	80,000
Diamond	1,000,000	800,000

=== Singles ===
Prior to 12 September 2016, Music Canada had different certification levels for physical singles and digital downloads singles. On that date, the digital downloads singles award was discontinued and the singles award consisted of sales numbers for digital downloads and physical singles alike. It also includes streams, where 150 on-demand audio streams from a subscription service equals 1 unit towards certification.

Certification	Certifications after 12 Sep 2016
Gold	40,000
Platinum	80,000
Diamond	800,000

==== Certification before September 2016 ====
Physical singles
Certification	Releases before 1 Feb 1982	Releases before Sep 2002	Releases after Sep 2002^{[A]}
Gold	75,000	50,000	5,000
Platinum	150,000	100,000	10,000
Diamond	1,500,000	1,000,000	100,000
Digital downloads
Certification	Certifications before 1 Jan 2007^{[B]}	Certifications until Apr 2010^{[C]}	Certifications after 1 May 2010 (Discontinued 12 Sep 2016)
Gold	10,000	20,000	40,000
Platinum	20,000	40,000	80,000
Diamond	200,000	400,000	800,000

- CRIA / Music Canada certified digital download singles (and since 12 September 2016, any singles) applying the most recent certification-levels, even to those titles that are released during the time frame the CRIA had lower certification-levels for digital download singles. One such example is the single "Right Round" by Flo Rida feat. Kesha, which was released in January 2009 when certification-levels for Digital-downloads were 10,000 units for Gold and 20,000 units for Platinum. The CRIA (currently Music Canada) certified it three times Platinum in October 2010, applying the latest certification-levels for sales of 240,000 units.

=== RingTone and Music DVD ===
Ringtone (singles) certifications and Music DVD certifications were retired on 1 April 2021.

Certification	For all RingTone releases	For all Video releases
Gold	20,000	5,000
Platinum	40,000	10,000
Diamond	400,000	100,000

== See also ==
- RIAA

== Notes ==
- A One of the first physical singles that was certified with levels of Gold=5,000 and Platinum=10,000 was "A Moment Like This" by Kelly Clarkson, which was released on 17 September 2002.
- B One of the first digital singles that was certified with levels of Gold=20,000 and Platinum=40,000 was "Paralyzer" by Finger Eleven, which was released as a digital track on 6 March 2007.
- C One of the first digital singles that was certified with levels of Gold=40,000 and Platinum=80,000 was "OMG" by Usher, which was released as a digital track on 30 March 2010.
- D From 2004, the "Big Four" were Universal, Sony, EMI and Warner. EMI was later absorbed by Universal and Sony. In 2018, they collectively controlled over 70% of the market.
