= Copyright Board of Canada =

The Copyright Board of Canada (French: Commission du droit d'auteur du Canada) is an economic regulatory body empowered to establish, either mandatorily or at the request of an interested party, the royalties to be paid for the use of copyrighted works, when the administration of such copyright is entrusted to a collective-administration society. The Board also has the right to supervise agreements between users and licensing bodies and issues licences when the copyright owner cannot be located.

The Honourable Luc Martineau is the current Chairman of the Board of Directors.

== See also ==
- Copyright Act of Canada
- Copyright law of Canada
- Robert A. Blair
- Luc Martineau
