= Bill C-60: An Act to amend the Copyright Act =

Proposed Canadian federal law

House of Commons of Canada
- Enacted by: House of Commons of Canada

Legislative history
- Bill title: Bill C-60: An Act to amend the Copyright Act
- Bill citation: Bill C-60
- Introduced by: Liza Frulla and David Emerson
- First reading: June 20, 2005
- Status: Not passed

Bill C-60: An Act to amend the Copyright Act (French: Project de loi C-60: Loi modifiant la Loi sur le droit d'auteur) was a proposed law to amend the Copyright Act initiated by the Liberal government of Prime Minister Paul Martin in 2005. Introduced by the Minister of Canadian Heritage and Minister responsible for Status of Women Liza Frulla and Minister of Industry David Emerson, it received its first reading in the House of Commons on June 20, 2005. On November 29, 2005, the opposition parties passed a non-confidence motion in the House of Commons, triggering the dissolution of Parliament and effectively killing the bill. The subsequent government tabled a similar bill called C-61.

Bill C-60 primarily implemented amendments to meet compliance obligations of two World Intellectual Property Organization treaties Canada is seeking to ratify, the WIPO Copyright Treaty and the WIPO Performances and Phonograms Treaty. In particular Technology Protection Measures (TPMs) and Rights Management Information (RMI), components of digital rights management (DRM) systems were addressed. It also included updates addressing short-term copyright reform issues dealing with the "challenges and opportunities presented by the Internet and digital technology in general". These focused on subjects such as network service provider liability, remote technology-based learning, and digital inter-library loans. Photography issues were given attention but Internet radio and Crown copyright were not.

Seen as the Canadian equivalent to the Digital Millennium Copyright Act (DMCA) in the United States, Bill C-60 met with public opposition before its first reading, with approximately 1800 Canadians signing the Petition for Users' Rights. Those opposed to the bill saw Bill C-60 as a move towards strengthening rights for copyright holders, while conceding the rights of users. They appealed to the government to "protect [Canadians'] creative, cultural and communications rights."

== Content ==
=== TPM protection ===
Technology Protection Measures (TPMs) refer to any technology-based solution that controls access to works, use of works, or both, ranging from simple passwords to complex cryptographic measures. They are often used to control copy protection of material and are often combined with other technologies as part of DRM systems.

Instead of explicitly prohibiting circumvention of TPMs, Bill C-60 provided remedies to copyright holders in the event of a TPM being compromised. These powers applied in three cases: (a) compromising a TPM for the purpose of infringing copyrights; (b) aiding in compromising a TPM; or (c) being aware that material in one's possession contains a compromised TPM. These provisions effectively sought to remove the right of people to make private copies of sound recordings. For example, when Bill C-60 was introduced, most songs on iTunes were sold with TPMs. The previously available right to make a private copy would have required compromising this TPM.

=== RMI protection ===
Rights Management Information (RMI) refers to information that is attached to a material form of a work that permits identification of the work or its author or describes terms or conditions of its use. RMIs are commonly part of DRM systems.

Similarly to TPMs, Bill C-60 did not imply that removing or altering an RMI constitutes copyright infringement, however, it provided copyright holders with remedies for alterations that facilitated or concealed the owner's copyright. These powers applied for material: (a) sold or rented; (b) distributed in a way damaging to the copyright owner; (c) as a result of trade, distributed or exposed to sale, rental, or public exhibit; (d) imported material into Canada; or (e) telecommunicated to the public.

=== Internet related protections ===
==== Network service providers ====
Bill C-60 prescribed that network service providers are only required to remove content pursuant to a court order. However, it required network service providers to operate by a notice-and-notice system: allegations of copyright infringement needed to be forwarded to the subscriber. While failure to forward the notice came with a maximum damage award of $5,000, there was no penalty for filing a wrongful notice. The bill required the network service provider retain subscriber identity records for six months upon receipt of an infringement notice and for one year in the event of legal proceedings. Failure to do so came with statutory damages of up to $10,000 for the network service provider.

==== Search engines ====
Referred to in Bill C-60 as "information location tool providers", search engines were required to abide by a similar notice-and-notice system as that of network service providers. Provisions were made for one exception: copyright infringement through the caching mechanism of the search engine. While not liable for infringements made in this manner, Bill C-60 stated that search engines can be ordered to remove the infringing material from the cache or be requested to stop caching infringing content. In this case, a notice-and-takedown system is established.

==== Peer-to-peer ====
While Bill C-60 did not alter the right to make private copies of copyrighted material, it introduced limitations on the use of these private copies. In particular, the bill sought to make selling, renting, trading, distributing, and communicating legally-made private copies of a copyrighted work an infringement of copyrights. This implied that if downloads via peer-to-peer were "for personal use, and not redistributed, there will be no infringement."

=== Photography protections ===
Under Bill C-60, photographers commissioned to take photographs were to retain ownership of the copyright of these photographs. This change came as an attempt to generalize the treatment of authors under the act; in the existing act, photographers were treated differently. This made sense for corporate commissioning, giving the photographer substantial bargaining power. However, for the average consumer, the provisions removed rights, and control over the use, duplication, distribution, display, and derivations of such commissioned works were greatly compromised.

== Differences from DMCA ==
Bill C-60 targeted only the act of circumventing copy-protections for the explicit purpose of infringing copyright, while the DMCA targets the makers and distributors of devices using circumvention techniques and bans all forms of circumvention without regard to intention. The latter is seen to be more stifling for technological innovation. Secondly, in the area of the Internet, Bill C-60 sought to impose a system of notice-and-notice for network service providers. In contrast, the DMCA prescribes a system of notice-and-takedown in order for network service providers to be exempt from infringement liability.

== See also ==
- Anti-Counterfeiting Trade Agreement (ACTA)
- An Act to amend the Copyright Act (39th Canadian Parliament, 2nd Session)
- An Act to amend the Copyright Act (40th Canadian Parliament, 3rd Session)
- Bill C-11 (41st Canadian Parliament, 1st Session)
- Copyright Act of Canada
- DADVSI
- Digital Millennium Copyright Act (DMCA)
- Protection of Broadcasts and Broadcasting Organizations Treaty
