= Protection of Broadcasts and Broadcasting Organizations Treaty =

Proposed international treaty

The Protection of Broadcasts and Broadcasting Organizations Treaty also known as the Broadcast Treaty was a treaty proposed by the World Intellectual Property Organization to afford broadcasters some control and copyright-like control over the content of their broadcasts. Under this treaty, media broadcasters would have the right to protect their broadcasts from reproduction, retransmission, and public communication, with copyright protection over fifty years. A first treaty proposal was established in 2006, and a revised draft was issued the same year to include protection rights for webcasting, netcasting and simulcasting. However, the proposal faced mixed reception from various companies. The United States tried to re-open discussions about the treaty in 2008, without success, meaning that international rules to protect television broadcasts are still addressed by the 1961 Rome treaty.

== Current status ==
Between May 1 and May 5, 2006, the WIPO Standing Committee on Copyright and Related Rights (or SCCR) established a Basic Proposal in order to develop protection rights for all broadcast organizations. However, members at the meeting decided at the time to exclude webcasting from the treaty, as well as establish a Revised Draft Basic Proposal in a September 2006 congregation. The revised proposal would in fact consider creating protection rights for webcasting, netcasting, and simulcasting. Between September 25 and October 3, 2006, members of the SCCR met in Geneva and agreed to finalize the draft text at a later time. They would have another conference meeting between July 11 and August 1, 2007, in order to update the rights of broadcasting organizations.

== Broadcaster rights ==
Under the treaty, media broadcasters would have the right to protect the content of their media transmissions. Moreover, they would have the right to protect their broadcasts from reproduction, retransmission, and even from public communication. All copyright protections would endure for 50 years.

== Overview ==
According to the US Government in 2007:

Because existing international agreements relevant to broadcasting protections do not cover advancements in broadcasting technology that were not envisioned when they were concluded, in 1998 the Standing Committee on Copyright and Related Rights (SCCR) of the World Intellectual Property Organization (WIPO) decided to proceed with efforts to negotiate and draft a new treaty that would extend protection to new methods of broadcasting, but has yet to achieve consensus on a text. In recent years, a growing signal piracy problem has increased the urgency of concluding a new treaty, resulting in a decision to restrict the focus to signal-based protections for traditional broadcasting organizations and cablecasting. Consideration of controversial issues of protections for webcasting (advocated by the United States) and simulcasting will be postponed. However, considerable work remains to achieve a final proposed text as the basis for formal negotiations to conclude a treaty by the end of 2007, as projected. A concluded treaty would not take effect for the United States unless Congress enacts implementing legislation and the United States ratifies the treaty with the advice and consent of the Senate. Noting that the United States is not a party to the 1961 Rome Convention, various stakeholders have argued that a new broadcasting treaty is not needed, that any new treaty should not inhibit technological innovation or consumer use, and that Congress should exercise greater oversight over U.S. participation in the negotiations.

In November 2008, the US re-opened talks about the Treaty and the internet.

== Reception ==
=== Negative ===
The Electronic Frontier Foundation argues that "the only thing the Broadcasting Treaty is good for is crushing innovation" They argued that it would allow broadcasters unfair and absolute control over other copyright holders, and even works in the public domain; and that nearly all broadcasts are already protected by copyright.

Podcasters - like the ones represented by UK Podcasters Association - don't like that the treaty "would require signatory countries to provide legal protection for technological protection measures (TPM) and is likely to lead to technology mandate laws controlling the design of broadcast-receiving devices." Podcasters and the EFF also worries that the Treaty will hurt innovation in podcasting and internet distribution technologies.

Intel, AT&T, Sony, CTIA - The Wireless Association, the US Public Interest Research Group, and the American Association of Law Libraries say that "Creating broad new... rights in order to protect broadcast signals is misguided and unnecessary, and risks serious unintended negative consequences" and "We note with concern that treaty proponents have not clearly identified the particular problems that the treaty would ostensibly solve, and we question whether there are in fact significant problems that are not addressed adequately under existing law".

== See also ==
=== Related laws ===
- Digital Millennium Copyright Act
- Anti-Counterfeiting Trade Agreement
- Free Trade Area of the Americas
- Bill C-61

=== Related technologies ===
- Web television
- Content delivery network
- Internet television
- P2PTV
- Peer-to-peer
- Podcasting
- YouTube
- Internet

=== Other ===
- Creative Commons
- Electronic Frontier Foundation
- User-generated content
