= Canadian Music Creators Coalition =

Music coalition

Canadian Music Creators Coalition is a group of Canadian music artists opposed to introducing legislation similar to the United States' DMCA into Canadian intellectual property law. The group was officially formed April 26, 2006. An editorial from founding member Steven Page (formerly of the band Barenaked Ladies) announcing the formation of the coalition detailed three core principles, which included opposition to litigation against fans who download music, opposition to digital copy protection, and encouragement of a cultural policy that supported Canadian artists. According to Page, "This effort is not about giving our music away, it's about encouraging innovative approaches that will compensate musicians and protect music fans from litigation." The group received support from Charlie Angus, the NDP Heritage Critic. The Canadian Music Creators Coalition has provided a public voice on issues that affect its members, describing the Songwriters Association of Canada's proposal to monetize file sharing as a "forward thinking approach" and denouncing Bill C-61 for not focusing on the real needs of creators.

== Notable Members ==
- alexisonfire
- Randy Bachman
- Barenaked Ladies (founders)
- Billy Talent
- Broken Social Scene
- Bob Ezrin
- Leslie Feist
- Matthew Good
- Bill Henderson
- Greg Keelor
- Chantal Kreviazuk
- Avril Lavigne
- Lighthouse
- Tara MacLean
- Raine Maida
- Sarah McLachlan
- Metric
- The New Pornographers
- One Bad Son
- Blair Packham
- Sam Roberts
- Sloan
- Stars
- Steven Page
- Sum 41
- Arlen Thompson
- Three Days Grace
