= Michael Geist =

Canadian academic on internet and e-commerce law

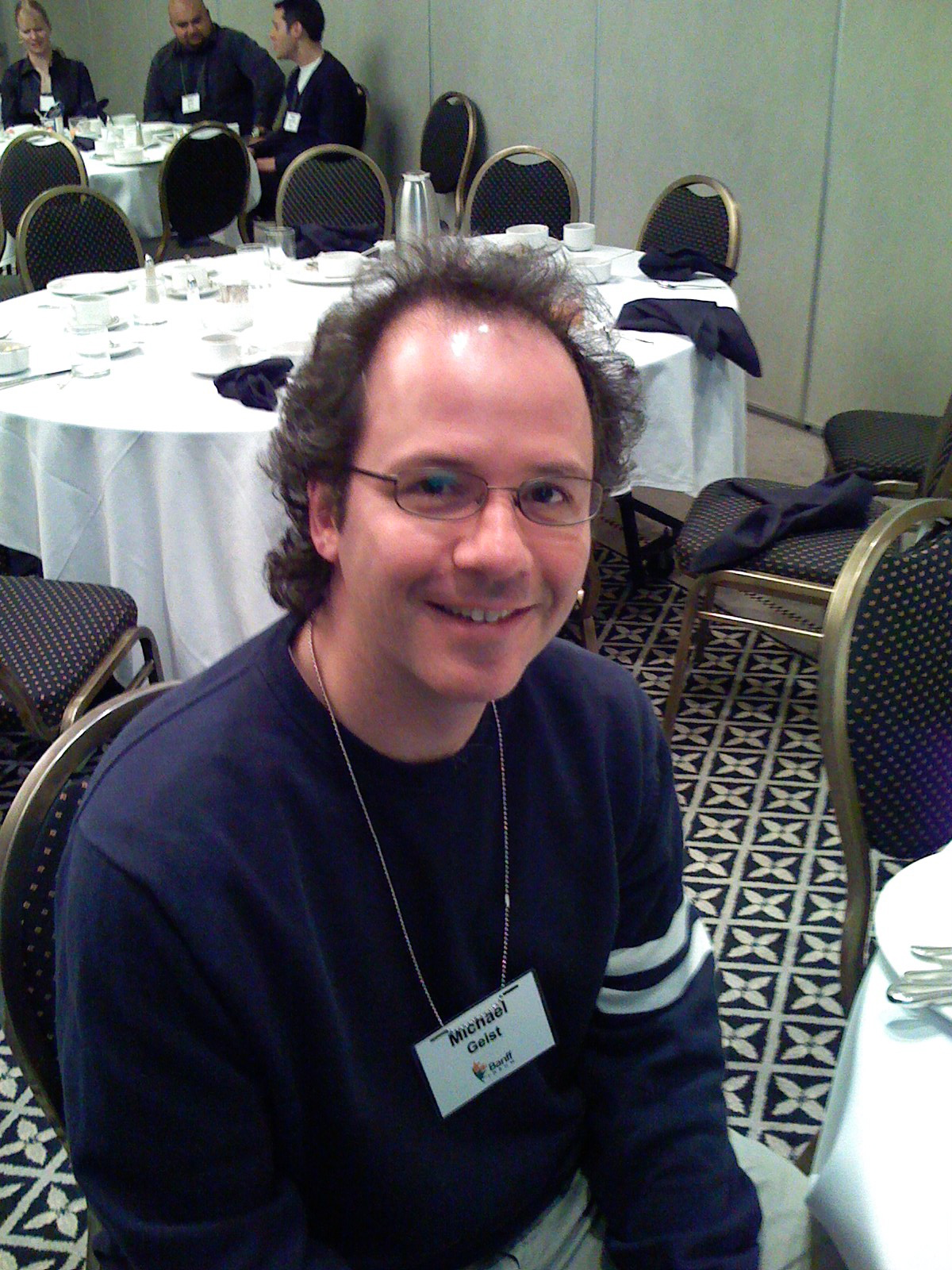
- Michael Geist in October 2007
- Born: Michael Allen Geist
- Education: University of Western Ontario, Osgoode Hall Law School, Cambridge University and the Columbia Law School
- Occupations: Academic and Canada Research Chair
- Employer: University of Ottawa
- Website: michaelgeist.ca

Michael Allen Geist is a Canadian academic, and the Canada Research Chair in Internet and E-Commerce Law at the University of Ottawa. He is the editor of four books on copyright law and privacy law, and he edits two newsletters on Canadian information technology and privacy law.

Geist writes syndicated columns for some of Canada's largest newspapers, including the Globe and Mail, the Ottawa Citizen and the Toronto Star. His blog on the Internet and intellectual property law is a three-time Best Canadian Law Blog winner.

Geist was named one of Canada's Top 40 Under 40 in 2002, and Canadian Lawyer magazine identified Geist as one of the country's 25 most influential lawyers. He has been listed globally as one of the top fifty influential people in regard to intellectual property by Managing Intellectual Property. Geist has received the Electronic Frontier Foundation's EFF Pioneer Award, and the Public Knowledge IP3 Award, regarded as two of the top digital rights awards in the world.

All Geist's books and articles are published under Creative Commons or open access licences.

== Education ==
Michael Geist attended the University of Western Ontario, and Osgoode Hall Law School at York University where he earned a Bachelor of Laws (LL.B.) degree. He obtained a Master of Laws (LL.M.) from the University of Cambridge, and a Master of Laws (LL.M.) degree and Doctorate in Law (J.S.D.) from Columbia Law School.

== Career ==
Michael Geist joined the Faculty of Law at the University of Ottawa in 1998, and was promoted to full professor in 2012. He has held visiting positions at the University of Haifa, Hong Kong University and Tel Aviv University. Geist is a Former Senior Fellow at the Centre for International Governance Innovation, and is a member of the University of Ottawa's Centre for Law, Technology and Society.

In addition to professional journal publications, Geist is the author of Internet Law in Canada, 3rd Edition, and has edited four books on copyright law and privacy law in Canada. Geist is author of a popular blog on the Internet and intellectual property law, and author of the "Law Bytes" podcast.

Geist has served on numerous boards and advisory panels, including the board of Ingenium: Canada's Museums of Science and Innovation; the board of Internet Archive Canada; the Electronic Frontier Foundation Advisory Board; the Canadian Legal Information Institute Board of Directors; the Privacy Commissioner of Canada's Expert Advisory Board; the Information Program Sub-Board of the Open Society Institute; and Waterfront Toronto's Digital Strategy Advisory Panel.

=== Copyright Law ===
Geist supports a consumer-oriented approach to copyright law, and he led the public response to proposed legislation in 2007. Geist's research "played a key role in influencing policy-makers during the enactment of Bill C-11, which modernized the Copyright Act of Canada for the digital age." His work has been cited in several Supreme Court of Canada copyright decisions.

According to Geist, proposed Canadian legislation in 2007 included the worst aspects of the 1998 U.S. Digital Millennium Copyright Act (DCMA) "with strong anti-circumvention legislation — far beyond what is needed to comply with the WIPO Internet treaties" and with no protection for "flexible fair dealing. No parody exception. No time shifting exception. No device shifting exception. No expanded backup provision. Nothing."

Geist has continued to play a prominent role on copyright in Canada, with numerous articles, speeches, books, and appearances before House of Commons and Senate committees. In October 2011, when the Canadian government attempted to pass a new bill on copyright reform which included digital lock rules, Geist argued that, based on former submissions to the government on Bill C-32 and the 2009 national copyright consultation, the bill was too restrictive and was primarily about satisfying U.S. pressure, not public opinion."

=== Trade: ACTA, the TPP and USMCA ===
Geist is considered an expert on intellectual property and digital trade issues associated with trade agreements. He played a key role in the failed international Anti-Counterfeiting Trade Agreement (ACTA), criticizing the ACTA negotiation process for lack of transparency, and warning of possible negative consequences for Internet users. He was similarly active in assessing the implications of the Trans-Pacific Partnership and reforms to the North American Free Trade Agreement (NAFTA), later called the United States-Mexico-Canada Agreement (USMCA) in the United States or CUSMA in Canada.

=== Telecom: Usage-based billing and Net Neutrality ===
In 2011, Geist criticized the Canadian Radio-television and Telecommunications Commission's (CRTC) history of inability to foster an atmosphere of competition that would allow third-party internet service providers (ISPs) to gain a foothold in the Canadian market. He did note, with the CRTC's usage based oral hearing on July 19, 2011, that they were making efforts to address this lack of competition and criticized Bell Canada and other major companies for their involvement in limiting smaller ISPs. Also in 2011, he wrote a report on the transport costs of a gigabyte for a Canadian consumer from an ISP and concluded it was roughly eight cents per gigabyte. This report was later denounced by the major ISPs, most notably Bell Canada.

Geist has been a vocal supporter of net neutrality in Canada, writing widely on the subject and frequently discussing the issue in the mainstream media. In 2017, he appeared before the House of Commons Standing Committee on Access to Information, Privacy and Ethics to explain his key concerns to Members of Parliament.

=== Privacy ===
Geist has regularly appeared before House of Commons committees to discuss privacy protection and potential reforms. He is the editor of the Canadian Privacy Law Review and served on the Privacy Commissioner of Canada's Expert Advisory Board. He is the editor of the 2015 book, Law, Privacy and Surveillance in Canada in the Post-Snowden Era.

=== Website blocking ===
In 2018, Geist opposed a proposal to establish a website-blocking system in Canada to be overseen by the Canadian Radio-television and Telecommunications Commission. He wrote dozens of widely cited posts on concerns with the proposal. The CRTC rejected the proposal on jurisdictional grounds in October 2018.

=== The Online Streaming Act (Bill C-11) ===
Geist criticized the Online Streaming Act (Bill C-11) because it could limit consumer choice if imposing restrictions causes streaming platforms to charge more, or pull out of Canada. Also, altering how discovery works would be detrimental to content creators. He said the government, through its regulator the Canadian Radio-television and Telecommunications Commission (CRTC), "gets to determine what gets prioritized…It's going to make choices – elevating some and deprioritizing others. That clearly has an impact on individual Canadians' expressive rights."

=== The Online News Act (Bill C-18) ===
Geist expressed three major concerns with the Online News Act, Bill C-18. He opposes, in principle, requiring payment for links, indexing, and any other mechanism to facilitate access to news because of "the harm to freedom of expression and the free flow of information online". Also, the Act would only apply to Google and Meta platforms, leaving out similar companies such as X (formerly Twitter), Apple, Microsoft, and generative AI companies, such as OpenAI.

Further, the definition of eligible news businesses was expanded, and goes beyond the standards established under the Income Tax Act which govern Qualified Canadian Journalism Organizations. As a result, Geist said "the bill would require payments to broadcasters without any actual journalism or original news content. That isn't funding for journalism or journalists. It is creating a subsidy program that only requires a CRTC-issued licence."

== Books ==
- Law, Privacy and Surveillance in Canada in the Post-Snowden Era, Editor.
- The Copyright Pentalogy: How the Supreme Court of Canada Shook the Foundations of Canadian Copyright Law, Editor.
- From Radical Extremism to Balanced Copyright: Canadian Copyright and the Digital Agenda, Editor.
- In the Public Interest: The Future of Canadian Copyright Law, Editor.
- Internet Law in Canada, 3rd Edition.

== Awards and recognition ==
- 2023, Privacy and Access Council of Canada Fellowship Award.
- 2018, Appointment to the Order of Ontario.
- 2018, Vox Libera Award for his contribution to freedom of expression by Canadian Journalists for Freedom of Expression.
- 2016, University of Ottawa Open Scholarship Award.
- 2011, 2012, 2013, Named one of the 25 most influential lawyers in Canada by Canadian Lawyer magazine.
- 2010, Kroeger College Award in Public Affairs, for Policy Leadership.
- 2010, Listed globally as one of the top fifty influential people in regard to intellectual property by Managing Intellectual Property.
- 2010, IP3 Award from the Washington-based public interest group Public Knowledge.
- 2009, Les Fowlie Award for Intellectual Freedom from the Ontario Library Association
- 2008, Electronic Frontier Foundation's EFF Pioneer Award.
- 2003, Canarie's IWAY Public Leadership Award.
- 2002, Named one of Canada's Top 40 Under 40.
