= Defences in Canadian copyright law =

In Canada, the Copyright Act provides a monopoly right to owners of copyrighted works. This implies no person can use the work without authorization or consent from the copyright owner. However, certain exceptions in the Act govern circumstances where a work will not be held to have been infringed.

== Principal Defences ==
Defendants can, where applicable, argue that copyright infringement could not have taken place, as:

1. There was no copyright in the work created.
2. There was no copyright in the copied element.
3. No substantial part was taken.
4. The work was in the public domain.
5. The plaintiff is not the true owner of the copyrighted work.
6. Substantial similarity and access to the original work may be shown, but the work was not copied.

Other defences may be available to the defendants, in cases where some features of copyrighted work exists, but does not constitute infringement. These include:

1. Public interest
2. Fair dealing
3. Other statutory exceptions

=== Public Interest ===
At common law, copyright may be overridden for public interest reasons, albeit in very rare circumstances.

In Lion Laboratories v Evans, the copyrighted information about malfunctioning breathalyser machines was reproduced. Such reproduction was held to be justified, despite the nature of material, being confidential and protected by copyright. Court agreed to the defence of public interest, raised by defendants on ground of investigations made regarding the accuracy of the equipment to avoid incorrect readings when used by the police on motorist. As Griffiths LJ noted in his judgment:

I can see no sensible reason why this defence should be limited to cases in which there has been wrongdoing on the part of the plaintiffs.... No doubt it is in such circumstances that the defence will usually arise, but it is not difficult to think of instances where, although there has been no wrongdoing on the part of the plaintiff, it may be vital in the public interest to publish a part of his confidential information.

In Beloff v Pressdram Ltd, the defence of public interest has been interwoven with fair dealing. The court observed fair dealing as a statutory defence limited to infringement of copyright. On the other hand, public interest acts as a defence outside, and independent of statutes, which is based on principles of common law.

The public interest defence is identical to that available in cases concerning breach of confidence, and is available when the necessity to publish more than just short extracts is required. It is distinct from the power arising from the inherent jurisdiction of the courts "to refuse to allow their process to be used [to] give effect to contracts which are ... illegal, immoral or prejudicial to family life because they offend against the policy of the law."

=== Fair Dealing ===
The Copyright Act states that fair dealing exists when it is done:

- for the purpose of research, private study, education, parody or satire;
- for the purpose of criticism or review, as long as it mentions the source and, if mentioned, the author, performer, maker or broadcaster
- for the purpose of news reporting, as long as it mentions the source and, if mentioned, the author, performer, maker or broadcaster

In Hubbard v Vosper, Lord Denning MR observed, "It is impossible to define what is 'fair dealing.' It must be a question of degree," and "after all is said and done, it must be a matter of impression." He gave several guidelines for analyzing what is fair or not:

- The number and extent of the quotations or extracts must be consider. Excess number and length might not be fair.
- Use as a basis for comment, criticism or review may be fair dealing, but being used to convey the same information as the author, for a rival purpose, may be unfair.
- Taking long extracts and attaching short comments may be unfair, but short extracts and long comments may be fair.
- There may be other considerations as well.

Hubbard was adopted in Canadian jurisprudence in 1997 in Allen v Toronto Star Newspapers Ltd, which ousted the 1943 Exchequer Court of Canada case of Zamacois v Douville and Marchand in the area of what constitutes fair dealing in illustrating a current news story. In so holding, Sedgwick J observed:

To the extent that this decision is considered an authority for the proposition that reproduction of an entire newspaper article or, in this case, a photograph of a magazine cover, can never be considered a fair dealing with the article (or magazine cover) for purposes of news summary or reporting, we respectfully disagree.

CCH Canadian Ltd v Law Society of Upper Canada, expanded upon that, with the Supreme Court of Canada holding that fair dealing, as well as related exceptions, is a user’s right. In order to maintain the proper balance between the rights of copyright owners and user’s interest, it must not be interpreted restrictively. It is also integral to the Act, and the defence is always available. The Court gave a two-stage test for determining whether fair dealing applies:

In order to show that a dealing is fair	Factors for determining fairness
a defendant must prove: 1. that the dealing was for a stated purpose, and 2. that it was fair.	1. the purpose of the dealing, 2. the character of the dealing, 3. the amount of the dealing, 4. alternatives to the dealing, 5. nature of the work, and 6. effect of the dealing on the work.

The effect of CCH has been for Canada becoming less rigid than the UK in interpreting fair dealing, and more flexible than the US approach of fair use in its copyright law. Further expansion of the jurisprudence came in 2012 with SOCAN v Bell Canada and Alberta (Education) v Canadian Copyright Licensing Agency (Access Copyright).

Regarding other specific matters concerning fair dealing:

- With respect to criticism and review, "Criticism of a work need not be limited to criticism of style. It may also extend to the ideas to be found in a work and its social or moral implications." However, it must be done in good faith. As Lord Denning MR noted in Hubbard, "'It is not fair dealing for a rival in the trade to take copyright material and use it for his own benefit."
- With respect to news reporting, timeliness may sometimes require the use of copyrighted material without prior permission while the value, importance and interest in the story are still current. It has also been held that "events, such as tragedies in which people are killed, continue to be current events so long as the events themselves continue to feature in the news."

=== Other statutory exceptions ===
Sections 29.21–32.3 provide other exceptions from copyright infringement in cases concerning:

- educational institutions
- libraries, archives and museums
- single reproduction of computer programs as backup
- incidental use
- ephemeral recording
- pre-recorded works
- persons with disabilities
- purposes of certain federal Acts, such as the Access to Information Act
- the author making certain copies
- agriculture fairs
- religious purposes
- non-commercial user-generated content
- certain reproduction for private purposes
- fixing signals and recording programs for later listening or viewing
- backup copies (of works other than software)
- interoperability of computer programs
- encryption research
- computer systems and network security, and
- temporary reproductions for technological processes

== Possible defences ==
Several other arguments have been presented as possible defences for copyright infringement:

- Section 2(b) of the Canadian Charter of Rights and Freedoms, governing freedom of expression, could be said to hold that limiting the use of copyrighted material is unconstitutional, as opposed to asserting that the copyright scheme as a whole is unconstitutional. Canadian courts have not yet definitely rejected or accepted the proposition. In the case of Queen v Lorimer, the Federal Court of Appeal rejected the Charter defence, but left the possibility of it succeeding in future. The Federal Court of Canada - Trial Division considered this defence in Michelin v CAW, but held that the Charter did not confer the right to use private property to express oneself. Thus, the defendants' freedom of expression had not been infringed.
- The duty to act in good faith, as noted in Houle v National Bank and Wallace v United Grain Growers Ltd, could be argued to hold that a party may not exercise a right in an unreasonable manner.
- The US doctrine of copyright misuse has been argued, but not yet accepted, in Canadian courts.
