= Kambisseri Karunakaran =

Indian journalist (1922–1977)

- Born: P. N. Karunakaran; 3 March 1922; Vallikunnam, Travancore, India
- Died: 27 July 1977 (aged 55)
- Occupation: Journalist
- Notable work: Role of Paramu Pillai in the drama Ningalenne Communistakki (You made me a Communist); Kambisseri Krithikal (Works of Kambisseri)
- Title: Chief editor of Janayugam Publications; Member of Legislative Assembly (1952-54, Travancore-Cochin); Chairman of KPAC; Actor
- Spouse: P. Premavally alias Prema Kambisseri
- Children: Dr. K. Usha, PhD.; Er. K. Rafi; Dr. K. Roby, D.Engg. k.Thankachan

Sri. P. N. Karunakaran (Puthenveettil Narayanan Karunakaran), popularly known as Kambisseri Karunakaran (3 March 1922 – 27 July 1977) was an Indian journalist who wrote in Malayalam language. He was the chief editor of Janayugam Daily, Balayugam (Children's monthly), the Novel Pathippu (Monthly novel issue), Cine Rama (Fortnightly movie magazine), and Janayugam Varika (Weekly), a group of publications in Malayalam language, owned by the Communist Party of India. Beside being a journalist he was a politician, writer, orator, actor, satirist, atheist and rationalist.

He was an MLA, Member of Thiru-Kochi (Travancore-Cochin) Legislative Assembly from 1952 to 1954 representing Kayamkulam constituency.

Many times he was a member of the Kerala State film awards committee.

He died aged 55 around 4.30 P.M. on 27 July 1977 at the pay ward of the Medical College Hospital at Thiruvananthapuram, the capital of the Kerala state. According to his wishes, his burial was conducted without social niceties and religious ceremonies within six hours of his death, at his ancestral house "Kambisseri" at Vallikunnam in Alleppey district. The junction near the house is named in his honour as "Kambisseri Mukku" (Kambisseri Junction). A school in Vallikunnam is also named after him and is known as Kambisseri Karunakaran Memorial Government Vocational Higher Secondary School (K.K.M. Govt. V.H.S.S), Vattakkadu, Elippakulam.

== Biography ==
=== Early life and background ===
P. N. Karunakaran alias Kambisseri Karunakaran was born on 3 March 1922 at Vallikunnam, Alleppey as the son of Kambisseri Kochikka Channar and Kunjikka (a member of the Ayathil Puthenveedu family at Elavumthitta in the present Pathanamthitta district). Karunakaran grew up imbibing the revolutionary and rationalist qualities of his father. However, unlike his father, Karunakaran was of quiet and soft temperament. He was only eight years old when his mother died. Following this, his father remarried and he was cared for by his eldest sister, Lakshmi amma. Karunakaran was susceptible to a variety of illnesses.

His early school education was undertaken at Areekara primary school in Vallikunnam, which was established as a result of his father's untiring efforts. Further, he studied at a primary school at Vattakad, Vallikunnam till fourth grade. He completed his middle school education at the S. N. D. P. Sanskrit school in Vallikunnam and later moved on to the Government Sanskrit High school.

He completed the madras matriculation examination in 1938 and joined the Trivandrum Sanskrit college. He could not complete his 'Mahopadhyaya' education there as he was jailed in the final year of study for participating in the freedom movement. He was in the Congress party.

=== Political activism ===
While Karunakaran's active involvement in politics might seem limited, all of his activities - including his work as a journalist, actor and as the secretary of KPAC was rooted in his political beliefs.

Vallikunnam of the 1930s was the site for Karunakaran's first foray into political activism. Inspired by his activist father, Kambisseri Kochikka Channaar and encouraged by supportive friends, a teenage Kambisseri began his foray into politics with the formation of 'Vallikunnam Yuvajana Samsat'. The Samsat initiated several youth into active politics and infused a new energy into the political scene in Vallikunnam. Soon, a hand-written magazine by the name of 'Bharatha Thozhilali' was started under the aegis of Karunakaran and Thoppil Bhasi. Though these activities fizzled out due to strict orders from the elders, Karunakaran's spirit to work for the betterment of the society did not die.

During his university days at Trivandram, Karunakaran, with his Gandhian spirit soon got involved in active politics. It was during his final year, as he was preparing to write the final examinations that he was involved in the picketing of University Arts College. While several students backed out fearing police brutality, Karunakaran refused to back down. He was arrested during the picketing and sent to a jail at Eraniyal in Tamil Nadu.

It was during this six month long imprisonment that Karunakaran became deeply acquainted with the socialist ideology. In Jail, he was greatly influenced by fellow inmates such as Puthupally Raghavan, P. Jeevanandham and Ilangovan Rajasekharan. It was during the imprisonment that he read The Communist Manifesto and other seminal works on Socialism. The debates, discussions and conversations in Jail gave Karunakaran a novel perspective. These influenced led him to form an organisation called 'Bharatha Thozhilali' post his imprisonment.

Until 1948, Karunakaran was a member of the Indian National Congress. However, the lack of systemic changes even after the British departure disillusioned him. Several acts of the governing party including refusal to release the protestors who were part of Punnapra-Vayalar uprising disappointed the party workers including Karunakaran and deepened the rift from Congress. Kambisseri agreed with youth leaders such as Thoppil Bhasi, K. Keshavan Potti, Pandalam P. R. Madhavan Pillai that the Congress Government seemed shy to honor its promise of a welfare state. There was a burning need to reform the society for the welfare of the working class. It is the live-d experience of this that ultimately converted Karunakaran into a Communist.

In 1951, Karunakaran contested the Thiru-Kochi (Travancore-Cochin) assembly election from Kayamkulam constituency, Krishnapuram Taluk [4] as a Communist candidate against Thazhava Kesavan (Kesavan Thazhava) of Congress party. This participation was against the wishes of his family, who worried about Karunakaran's health condition. However, he won the election with a large majority. As an MLA, Karunakaran was a firm advocate for education and he was at the forefront of protests to establish a high school in Vallikunnam (currently the Kambisseri Karunakaran Memorial Government Vocational Higher Secondary School). It was during his tenure as the MLA, the drama Ningalenne Communistakki in which he did the lead role was banned by the government and his speech in the assembly on the issue was notable. His speeches in the assembly were often presented as sharp satire that often helped bring the focus of the assembly on an issue. After his this role as an MLA, Karunakaran did not contest for any public office as he felt that active political authority did not suit his nature and it severely limited his independence and ability to abide by his conscience. He turned to journalism to channelize his thoughts and ideology.

=== Contributions to journalism ===
Kambisseri was an editor and a journalist who understood the psyche of the reader and introduced several new trends into journalism.

His foray into journalism began in 1942–43 with a hand-written magazine called 'Bharatha Thozhilali'. 'Bharatha Thozhilali' was founded to support a youth-led organization in Vallikunnam under the aegis of the Indian National Congress. Kambisseri was the chief editor of the 'Bharatha Thozhilali' and he was assisted by Thoppil Bhasi and Puthussery Ramachandran. Several notable writers have written for this hand-written magazine which Kambisseri collated, edited, illustrated and calligraphed himself.

Kambisseri's entry into active mainstream journalism was in the year 1946 in a newspaper called 'Yuvakeralam'. From 1946 to 1954, he worked with several newspapers such as Keralabhooshanam, Rajyabhimani, Vishvakeralam, Pouradhwani, in various capacities. It was in 1954 that he became a part of Janayugam. He remained synonymous with the newspaper till his death in 1977. It was under his visionary leadership that the various publications of Janayugam started and the weekly soared in popularity and readership. For certain period he was the Chief editor as well as the Managing editor.

Kambisseri was a leader who believed in maintaining a flat organizational structure and his co-workers recount that he maintained absolutely no power distance from his team. He actively pitched in to help all with no discrimination and demonstrated a very democratic style of leadership.

== Acting ==
=== Drama ===
- Did the lead role of "Paramu Pillai" in the popular Malayalam drama Ningalenne Communistakki of the early 1950s by KPAC. He had to discontinue stage acting due to bad health. However, he was actively associated with KPAC till his death.
- Gave voice to many Radio dramas by All India Radio, Kerala.

=== Movies ===
- Kambisseri Karunakaran held the producer role to the movies produced by KPAC movies.
- Kambisseri Karunakaran acted in about seven movies in the Malayalam language:
- Kaalam Marunnu (1955)
- Avarunarunnu (1956)
- Mudiyanaya Puthran (1961) as Chaathan (movie available in YouTube)
- Ninamaninja Kalpadukal (1963) as Thomachan (movie available in YouTube)
- Nithyakanyaka (1963)
- Aadyakiranangal (1964) as Kuttichan (movie available in YouTube)
- Aswamedham (1967) as Kushtarogi (the Leper) (movie available in YouTube)

== Books ==
=== Books by Kambisseri ===
Some of his writings include :

- "Aana Taxi". (collection of humorous articles)
- "Anthya Darsanam". (Novel)
- "Koonanthara Paramuvum Poona Kesavanum". (humorous novel)
- "Kure Sambhavangal". (collection of articles)
- "Abhinaya chintakal". (Thoughts on acting), a book on drama/ movie acting. കരുണാകരൻ ,കാമ്പിശ്ശേരി KARUNAKARAN, KAMBISSERY അഭിനയ ചിന്തകൾ ABHINAYA CHINTHAKAL - TRIVANDRUM PRABHATHAM PRINTING 1966 - 122
- "Kandathum Kelkkathathum". Articles published in ...
- "Kaanaatha Cinema". Articles published in ...
- "Kambisseri Kritikal". (collection of Kambisseri's literary works). Edited by Puthuppally Raghavan. Published posthumously by Prabhat Book House, Thiruvananthapuram.

=== Books on Kambisseri ===
- "Ormakalude Sugandham" (Fragrance of memories). Book about Kambisseri written by his daughter Dr. K. Usha.
- "Kambisseri Karunakaran Special Edition". Kaumudi Quarterly - 14. January–March 2008. 100 pages.
- "Njanonnu Paranjotte" (Let me tell) (1st Ed. 2010) an autobiographical book written by Smt. Prema Kambisseri, wife of Kambisseri. Yuvamela Publications, Kollam-691003. pages 184.
- Mychael Varghese (2011). "Kambisseri : Kaalam Maikkatha Kaiyoppu". National Book Stall, Kottayam. 66 pages.
- Kottukkal, Sabu (2012). "Kambisseri". Kerala Sahitya Akademi. ISBN 9788176902571.
- Cartoonist Yesudasan & S. Mohanachandran (2015). "Kambisseri Phalithangal" (Kambisseri's Humour). Sankeerthanam Publications, Kollam. 107 pages.

== Memoirs ==
=== TV programme ===
- Manorama News. "Annorikkal | Memories of Kambisseri Karunakaran". 29 min 52 sec. Directed by Pramod Payyannoor. (available in YouTube)

=== Radio programme ===
- "Kambisseri Karunakaran anusmaranam" (July 2018) in Community Radio Benziger 107.8 by Dr. K. V. Sanalkumar, Asramam Bhasi & Gopan Neeravil.

=== Articles in journals ===
- Lot of articles about Kambisseri Karunakaran are published in newspapers, weeklies and other publications

=== Public meetings ===
- Lot of public meetings were held remembering Kambisseri Karunakaran.

=== Kambisseri Karunakaran library ===
- This library was set up at Kollam (Quilon) under the aegis of the Janayugom Publications.
