= Fair dealing in Canadian copyright law =

Fair dealing is a statutory exception to copyright infringement, and is also referred to as a user's right (as opposed to an owner's right). According to the Supreme Court of Canada, it is more than a simple defence; it is an integral part of the Copyright Act of Canada, providing balance between the rights of owners and users. To qualify under the fair dealing exception, the dealing must be for a purpose enumerated in sections 29, 29.1 or 29.2 of the Copyright Act of Canada (research, private study, education, parody, satire, criticism or review and news reporting), and the dealing must be considered fair as per the criteria established by the Supreme Court of Canada.

== Historical development ==
In English law, copyright was first created by the Statute of Anne of 1709. Initially, there was no provision for unauthorized copying of copyrighted works. The intent was to give copyright holders a complete monopolistic control over the reproduction of their works. However, the courts were almost immediately flooded by lawsuits by publishers unhappy with negative book reviews that included even a single quote of a work and the courts recognized that the statutes were untenable. The common law doctrine of fair abridgment was created in Gyles v Wilcox, which eventually evolved and prompted the doctrine of fair dealing to permit the unauthorized copying of copyrighted works in certain circumstances. The ability to copy copyrighted works in an unauthorized manner is essential. As Justice Story explained in the US case of Emerson v. Davies:

In truth, in literature, in science and in art, there are, and can be, few, if any, things, which in an abstract sense, are strictly new and original throughout. Every book in literature, science and art, borrows, and must necessarily borrow, and use much which was well known and used before.

The Copyright Act of Canada was first passed in 1921. Substantial amendments occurred in 1988 and 1997. Fair dealing was first introduced in the 1921 Act, duplicating section 2(1)(i) of the U.K. Copyright Act 1911. Since then, fair dealing has been amended by statute three times. First, by the North American Free Trade Agreement Implementation Act, 1993, s. 64(1), and second by An Act to Amend the Copyright Act, 1997, s. 18. Most recently the Copyright Modernization Act, 2012 added the fair dealing purposes of education, parody and satire to a list that already included research, private study, criticism, review, and news reporting. In CCH Canadian Ltd. v. Law Society of Upper Canada, the Supreme Court of Canada established that "'research' must be given a large and liberal interpretation in order to ensure that users' rights are not unduly constrained". Later Canadian court decisions have made very clear that this 'large and liberal interpretation' must be applied to all fair dealing purposes, and not only to research.

Before it is even necessary to consider fair dealing, a would-be plaintiff has the burden of establishing an alleged infringement. After the plaintiff has established the existence of copyright infringement, the burden of proof then rests upon the defendant to establish the proper application of fair dealing. While the burden remains upon the defendant, fair dealing is considered a "user's right" rather than simply a defence, and should be interpreted liberally to accommodate freedom of expression as guaranteed by the Canadian Charter of Rights and Freedoms:

Before reviewing the scope of the fair dealing exception under the Copyright Act, it is important to clarify some general considerations about exceptions to copyright infringement. Procedurally, a defendant is required to prove that his or her dealing with a work has been fair; however, the fair dealing exception is perhaps more properly understood as an integral part of the Copyright Act than simply a defence. Any act falling within the fair dealing exception will not be an infringement of copyright. The fair dealing exception, like other exceptions in the Copyright Act, is a user's right. In order to maintain the proper balance between the rights of a copyright owner and users' interests, it must not be interpreted restrictively. As Professor Vaver, supra, has explained, at p. 171: "User rights are not just loopholes. Both owner rights and user rights should therefore be given the fair and balanced reading that befits remedial legislation."

Professor Carys Craig has commented that a liberal approach "acknowledges the collaborative and interactive nature of cultural creativity, recognizing that copyright-protected works can be copied, transformed, and shared in ways that actually further" the purpose of copyright. The Supreme Court, in Théberge v. Galerie d'Art du Petit Champlain inc., emphasized the importance of balancing "the public interest in promoting the encouragement and dissemination of works of the arts and intellect and obtaining a just reward for the creator." The fair dealing exception attempts to accomplish this balancing exercise by permitting unauthorized copying of works where such activities legitimately pursue free expression or further the objectives of copyright in promoting creativity and progress, while obtaining a just reward for copyright owners.

=== 2012 Supreme Court decisions ===
The Supreme Court of Canada issued decisions in five cases on copyright in 2012, two of which directly relate to fair dealing: Alberta (Education) v. Canadian Copyright Licensing Agency (Access Copyright) (educational use exception to fair dealing) and SOCAN v. Bell Canada et al. (previewing of music and whether that activity constitutes ‘fair dealing’ within the scope of the research exception). The Centre for Innovation Law and Policy of the Faculty of Law, University of Toronto, and the Samuelson-Glushko Canadian Internet Policy and Public Interest Clinic of the Faculty of Law, University of Ottawa, were among the interveners. These decisions were issued well after the introduction of the Copyright Modernization Act, 2012, in the House of Commons of Canada in September 2011, suggesting that the Supreme Court of Canada would have been aware of the upcoming changes to the Copyright Act at the time.

== Elements ==
Sections 29, 29.1 or 29.2 of the Copyright Act of Canada create the fair dealing exception to copyright:

Research, private study, etc.
s.29 Fair dealing for the purpose of research, private study, education, parody or satire does not infringe copyright.

Criticism or review
s.29.1 Fair dealing for the purpose of criticism or review does not infringe copyright if the following are mentioned:

(a) the source; and
(b) if given in the source, the name of the

(i) author, in the case of a work,
(ii) performer, in the case of a performer’s performance,
(iii) maker, in the case of a sound recording, or
(iv) broadcaster, in the case of a communication signal.

News reporting
s.29.2 Fair dealing for the purpose of news reporting does not infringe copyright if the following are mentioned:

(a) the source; and
(b) if given in the source, the name of the

(i) author, in the case of a work,
(ii) performer, in the case of a performer’s performance,
(iii) maker, in the case of a sound recording, or
(iv) broadcaster, in the case of a communication signal.

To qualify under the fair dealing exception, the dealing must be for a listed purpose and the dealing must be fair.

=== Purpose ===
Sections 29, 29.1 or 29.2 of the Copyright Act identify the permissible purposes. Prior to CCH Canadian Ltd. v. Law Society of Upper Canada, the list of purposes was considered to be exhaustive. In the case of Compagnie Générale des Établissements Michelin-Michelin & Cie v. National Automobile, Aerospace, Transportation and General Workers Union of Canada (CAW-Canada), the Federal Court of Canada rejected the defendant's assertion that utilizing the copyright of the plaintiff on a pamphlet criticising the labour practices of the plaintiff in a labour dispute could qualify as fair dealing, because the infringement was a parody and not listed as a permissible purpose. Following CCH, it is no longer certain whether the purposes listed are exhaustive as they are to be broadly interpreted. However, see the case of Canwest Mediaworks Publications Inc. v. Horizon Publications Ltd. which continued to apply the restrictive approach to permissible purposes.

Amendments to the Copyright Act, in force as of November 2012, have included additional specific enumerated purposes (education, satire and parody). As the Supreme Court of Canada stated, fair dealing "must not be interpreted restrictively". Following the Supreme Court of Canada precedent set in CCH, which stated that "'research' must be given a large and liberal interpretation in order to ensure that users’ rights are not unduly constrained", Canadian courts have found that all fair dealing purposes should be given the same large and liberal interpretation.

Dealings for mixed purposes are permissible, provided the alleged purpose relied upon to substantiate the fair dealing is not a disguise for an alternate purpose. This will be measured objectively.

One can deal for either their own purposes or for those of someone else, or they may facilitate same. In either case, fair dealing will be available if all other elements are made out.

It is the user's purpose that is relevant at this first stage of the analysis, although the copier's purpose can be considered at the secondary stage, during the fairness assessment.

In the case of dealing for the purpose of criticism, review or news reporting, it is necessary to attribute to the source. See sections 29.1 and 29.2 of the Copyright Act, above.

==== Research ====
Research involves investigating or closely studying a subject. In CCH, it was held that the reading of legal texts and judgments for the purpose of advising clients constituted research. More recently, it was held that 30 second preview clips of music streamed to potential customers for their evaluation in determining whether to purchase the song, constitutes research.

==== Private study ====
Private study involves applying oneself to acquire knowledge or learning, or examining or analyzing a subject. In Alberta (Education) v Canadian Copyright Licensing Agency (Access Copyright), the Supreme Court of Canada found that a teacher or copier's work to assist a student in their study, including instruction determined and directed by the teacher, is included in the concept of private study.

==== Criticism or review ====
Criticism and review involve analyzing and judging merit or quality. The dealing may even be defamatory while remaining a fair dealing. The key is that fairness relates to the extent, rather than the content, of the copying. With respect to criticism, greater emphasis will be placed upon the transformative nature of the copy.

==== News reporting ====
News reporting includes any medium such as newspaper, audio, or video. Investigative journalism qualifies.

=== Fairness of the dealing ===
Fairness is not defined in the Copyright Act. It is a question of fact.

The Copyright Act does not define what will be "fair"; whether something is fair is a question of fact and depends on the facts of each case. See McKeown, supra, at p. 23- 6. Lord Denning explained this eloquently in Hubbard v. Vosper, [1972] 1 All E.R. 1023 (C.A.), at p. 1027:

It is impossible to define what is 'fair dealing'. It must be a question of degree. You must consider first the number and extent of the quotations and extracts. Are they altogether too many and too long to be fair? Then you must consider the use made of them. If they are used as a basis for comment, criticism or review, that may be a fair dealing. If they are used to convey the same information as the author, for a rival purpose, that may be unfair. Next, you must consider the proportions. To take long extracts and attach short comments may be unfair. But, short extracts and long comments may be fair. Other considerations may come to mind also. But, after all is said and done, it must be a matter of impression. As with fair comment in the law of libel, so with fair dealing in the law of copyright. The tribunal of fact must decide.

A substantial part of a work can be used under fair dealing if it is for an allowable purpose (private study, research, criticism, review, newspaper summary, parody, satire, or education) and if the Supreme Court of Canada's six non-exhaustive factors test for fair dealing are met. These were identified in CCH as follows:

==== 1. Purpose of the dealing ====
Dealing for commercial purposes may be fair. However, "some dealings, even if for an allowable purpose, may be more or less fair than others; research done for commercial purposes may not be as fair as research done for charitable purposes."

In Access Copyright, it was observed in obiter that fair dealing is a user's right but that the copier's purpose is also relevant at the fairness stage. Where the purpose is not symbiotic with that of the user, the copier cannot "camouflage their own distinct purpose by purporting to conflate it with the research or study purposes of the ultimate user."

==== 2. Character of the dealing ====
The character of the dealing relates to the manner in which the work was dealt with: for instance, multiple copies that are widely distributed can be unfair. Alternatively, if the copy is destroyed after use, this may favour a finding of fairness. It was also suggested that custom or practice can be used to assess fairness.

==== 3. Amount of the dealing ====
Only a reasonably necessary amount of copying is permitted, but this requirement is interpreted broadly. The Supreme Court has stated that the allowable purposes must be given a "large and liberal interpretation" and "It may be possible to deal fairly with a whole work ... for the purpose of research or private study, it may be essential to copy an entire academic article or an entire judicial decision." In the case of photos, for example, it is permissible to copy the entire work as it would be impossible to otherwise deal with the work. The greater the amount of the work copied, however, the higher the burden of justification will be. The Copyright Board of Canada has stated that "where the amount copied was greater than 10 per cent of the work, we conclude that the amount copied tends to make the dealing unfair." The Board also notes that "In Alberta, the Supreme Court repeated the assertion from CCH that the allowable fair-dealing purposes must be given a 'large and liberal interpretation.' In Governments, the Board, after considering relevant legislation and case-law, concluded that ‘all of the purposes enumerated in sections 29–29.2 of the Act must receive a large and liberal interpretation.' We have no reason to depart from this conclusion."

==== 4. Alternatives to the dealing ====
The availability of a non-copyrighted equivalent may be relevant:

If there is a non-copyrighted equivalent of the work that could have been used instead of the copyrighted work, this should be considered by the court. I agree with the Court of Appeal that it will also be useful for courts to attempt to determine whether the dealing was reasonably necessary to achieve the ultimate purpose. For example, if a criticism would be equally effective if it did not actually reproduce the copyrighted work it was criticizing, this may weigh against a finding of fairness.

The availability of a license is irrelevant to in considering alternatives to the dealing:

The availability of a licence is not relevant to deciding whether a dealing has been fair. As discussed, fair dealing is an integral part of the scheme of copyright law in Canada. Any act falling within the fair dealing exception will not infringe copyright. If a copyright owner were allowed to license people to use its work and then point to a person's decision not to obtain a licence as proof that his or her dealings were not fair, this would extend the scope of the owner's monopoly over the use of his or her work in a manner that would not be consistent with the Copyright Act's balance between owner's rights and user's interests.

==== 5. Nature of the work ====
The nature of the work refers to the public availability of the work. For example, published v unpublished, or confidential v non-confidential works. Fair dealing applies to both, but at least in the US and UK, it will be more difficult to prove for unpublished works that the dealing was fair. A famous US example is Salinger v. Random House. The author of a biography of J. D. Salinger was prevented from quoting or paraphrasing Salinger's ideas displayed in an unpublished, but publicly archived, correspondence written by Salinger. The right of the author to control publication was held to override the U.S. principle of "fair use". However, at paragraph 58 of CCH:

Although certainly not determinative, if a work has not been published, the dealing may be more fair in that its reproduction with acknowledgement could lead to a wider public dissemination of the work - one of the goals of copyright law. If, however, the work in question was confidential, this may tip the scales towards finding that the dealing was unfair. See Beloff v. Pressdram Ltd., [1973] 1 All E.R. 241 (Ch. D.) at p. 264.

D’Agostino comments that in CCH, the Supreme Court "curiously came to a different conclusion about its effect: if a work is unpublished, it weighs in favour of fair dealing. In the United Kingdom and the United States, if a work is unpublished, it weighs against fair dealing. This interpretation indicates the Canadian court’s preference for users over protecting the interests of authors."

==== 6. Effect of the dealing on the work ====
A dealing which competes with, or is a substitute for, that of the copied work is unlikely to be fair: "If the reproduced work is likely to compete with the market of the original work, this may suggest that the dealing is not fair." However, commercial considerations are not conclusive, and a plaintiff must bring evidence of any detrimental impact upon the market for its work if it wishes to have it considered.

=== Application to guidelines ===
The application of the CCH analysis requires an understanding of copyright law, and many users have sought to simplify this process through the adoption of guidelines quantifying what amounts of a work may be acceptable. In a decision released July 12, 2017, the Federal Court of Canada concluded that the York University fair dealing guidelines were not fair. In that decision, emphasis was given to the second part of a two-stage analysis, in which a user must first identify whether a use was allowed before then assessing whether dealing is fair, and stressed that users must not conflate the two stages. The Federal Court particularly stressed the commercial benefit the university was gaining at the expense of publishers through the guidelines.

The university's appeal to the Federal Court of Appeal the fair dealing ruling was dismissed in April 2020 "on the basis that its Guidelines do not ensure that copying which comes within their terms is fair dealing", though the university still ultimately won the case on a separate issue The ruling was further appealed by both the university and the plaintiff to the Supreme Court. The Court likewise sided with the university on the separate issue, but went even further by explicitly rejecting the lower courts' fair dealing analysis. Holding that the lower courts' analysis had been tainted by the error of exclusively focusing on an institutional perspective, without considering the interests of the students' using the guidelines.

== Copyright Modernization Act (2012) ==
=== History ===
Prior to the passage of the Copyright Modernization Act in 2012, there were three previous attempts to amend the Copyright Act in 2005, 2008, and 2010.

=== Amendments to Fair Dealing provisions ===
As fair dealing must be for a listed purpose, three new permissible categories were introduced: education, parody and satire. These amendments accord with most users’ common perception and understanding of fair dealing rights.

=== Effect of "digital locks" on fair dealing rights ===
In response to perceived wide-scale copyright infringement, copyright owners began to implement technological locks and digital rights management. However, hackers have continually demonstrated success in circumventing such measures. For example, Blu-ray discs employ the Advanced Access Copy System (AACS), which has been successfully attacked on numerous occasions. Furthermore, in the case of Columbia Pictures Industries, Inc v Gaudreault the Federal Court of Appeal held that such circumvention of technological locks does not constitute copyright infringement. In response, copyright owners lobbied governments to ratify the World Intellectual Property Organization Copyright Treaty which was passed in 1996. Article 11 prohibits circumvention of technological locks, which is implemented by s. 47 of the 2012 Act. S. 48 provides for criminal sanctions upon persons who circumvent such technological locks.

While s. 47 empowered the Governor in Council to make regulations concerning the suspension of prohibition of circumvention of technological locks if same is having an adverse effect on fair dealing, it is uncertain to what extent such provision will be utilized. As a result, otherwise lawful fair dealing with copyrighted works will be prohibited, thereby nullifying fair dealing rights. The Canadian Government has stated that fair dealing and defences will not apply to circumvention of technological locks: "contravention of this prohibition is not an infringement of copyright and the defences to infringement of copyright are not defences to these prohibitions."

== International analogues to fair dealing ==
=== United Kingdom ===
Fair dealing in the United Kingdom is similar in many aspects to Canadian fair dealing, but there are important differences. It is created by sections 29 and 30 of the Copyright, Designs and Patents Act 1988:

s.29 Research and private study.

(1)Fair dealing with a literary, dramatic, musical or artistic work for the purposes of research for a non-commercial purpose does not infringe any copyright in the work provided that it is accompanied by a sufficient acknowledgement.
(1B)No acknowledgement is required in connection with fair dealing for the purposes mentioned in subsection (1) where this would be impossible for reasons of practicality or otherwise.
(1C)Fair dealing with a literary, dramatic, musical or artistic work for the purposes of private study does not infringe any copyright in the work.
(2)Fair dealing with the typographical arrangement of a published edition for the purposes of research or private study does not infringe any copyright in the arrangement.
(3)Copying by a person other than the researcher or student himself is not fair dealing if—

(a)in the case of a librarian, or a person acting on behalf of a librarian, he does anything which regulations under section 40 would not permit to be done under section 38 or 39 (articles or parts of published works: restriction on multiple copies of same material), or
(b)in any other case, the person doing the copying knows or has reason to believe that it will result in copies of substantially the same material being provided to more than one person at substantially the same time and for substantially the same purpose.

s.30 Criticism, review and news reporting.

(1)Fair dealing with a work for the purpose of criticism or review, of that or another work or of a performance of a work, does not infringe any copyright in the work provided that it is accompanied by a sufficient acknowledgement and provided that the work has been made available to the public.
(1A)For the purposes of subsection (1) a work has been made available to the public if it has been made available by any means, including—

(a)the issue of copies to the public;
(b)making the work available by means of an electronic retrieval system;
(c)the rental or lending of copies of the work to the public;
(d)the performance, exhibition, playing or showing of the work in public;
(e)the communication to the public of the work,

but in determining generally for the purposes of that subsection whether a work has been made available to the public no account shall be taken of any unauthorised act.
(2)Fair dealing with a work (other than a photograph) for the purpose of reporting current events does not infringe any copyright in the work provided that (subject to subsection (3)) it is accompanied by a sufficient acknowledgement.
(3)No acknowledgement is required in connection with the reporting of current events by means of a sound recording, film or broadcast where this would be impossible for reasons of practicality or otherwise.

It requires the dealing to be for one of three purposes: non-commercial research or private study, criticism or review, and reporting of news events. As in Canada, the dealing must be fair and there must be attribution for non-commercial research, criticism/review, and reporting of news events. Attribution need not occur where it would be impossible for reasons of practicality or otherwise. Factors to be considered in respect of the "fairness" of the dealing include the quantity of the work taken, whether or not it was previously published, the motives of the infringer and the effect on the market for the work. Similar to the emphasis on public interest and free of expression required by the Canadian Charter of Rights and Freedoms, the Human Rights Act necessitates a liberal construction to accommodate considerations of public interest.

=== United States ===
Fair use is the US analogue of fair dealing in Canada. It was not codified until 1976, when it was incorporated into the Copyright Act of 1976:

17 U.S.C. § 107

Notwithstanding the provisions of sections 17 U.S.C. § 106 and 17 U.S.C. § 106A, the fair use of a copyrighted work, including such use by reproduction in copies or phonorecords or by any other means specified by that section, for purposes such as criticism, comment, news reporting, teaching (including multiple copies for classroom use), scholarship, or research, is not an infringement of copyright. In determining whether the use made of a work in any particular case is a fair use the factors to be considered shall include:

1. the purpose and character of the use, including whether such use is of a commercial nature or is for nonprofit educational purposes;
2. the nature of the copyrighted work;
3. the amount and substantiality of the portion used in relation to the copyrighted work as a whole; and
4. the effect of the use upon the potential market for or value of the copyrighted work.

The fact that a work is unpublished shall not itself bar a finding of fair use if such finding is made upon consideration of all the above factors.

There are significant differences between Canadian fair dealing and US fair use. The most important is the fixed list of permissible purposes for fair dealing.

==== Permissible purposes ====
While the permissible purposes for fair dealing identified in sections 29, 29.1 or 29.2 of the Canadian Copyright Act are exhaustive, fair use may be for any purpose including but not limited to "criticism, comment, news reporting, teaching..., scholarship, or research". Parody was added in November 2012. The recognition of parody is in line with US law. It has been repeatedly recognized in the US despite not being listed in the Copyright Act of 1976: Leibovitz v Paramount Pictures Corp, Campbell v Acuff-Rose Music Inc., and in Suntrust v Houghton Mifflin. Fair use, in relation to fair dealing, has been described as the "fairest" system as it shifts the entire analysis to the fairness of the dealing, rather than a two-stage analysis requiring an initial permissible purpose before moving to a second-stage consideration of fairness.

==== Hierarchy of factors ====
In respect of the fairness of the dealing, D’Agostino identifies and discusses the most important differences: "In comparing the...jurisdictions, each of the respective courts are more or less open to consider the same types of factors. What distinguishes them is each court’s weight placed on these factors and, consequently, its policy perspective. By interpreting certain factors to be more determinative than others, each court undertakes a "hierarchy of factors" approach. Absent clearer guidelines, and to better anticipate how a fair dealing—fair use case might be resolved it is useful to understand what weight each court places on certain factors. In this light, it helps to compare the CCH factors to those considered in the United States"

===== Commercial purpose of the infringing copy =====
While the commercial nature of the infringing copy is explicitly mentioned and is a significant factor in determining fairness in the US codification, post-CCH it is a less important consideration in Canadian fair dealing.

===== Nature of the work =====
While fair dealing and fair use both consider the nature of the work as a factor, it is weighed differently. See the above section on the factors of fairness, addressing nature of the work.

===== Alternatives to the dealing =====
As noted above, the availability of a license is not a relevant consideration in Canadian fair dealing. However, it may be a relevant consideration in the US.
