= G. Janardhana Kurup =

Indian lawyer and communist politician

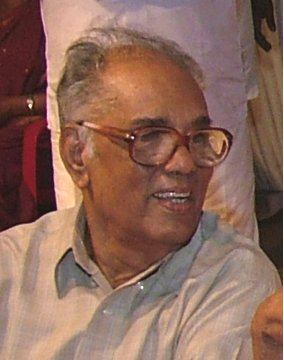
G. Janardhana Kurup

G. Janardhana Kurup (died 25 March 2011) was an Indian lawyer and communist politician. He grew up in Kollam, and joined the struggle for Indian independence at an early age. In the 1950s, he took part in founding the Kerala People's Arts Club. He was one of the main actors and a co-director in the play Ningalenne Communistakki, which was written by Thoppil Bhasi for the Kerala People's Arts Club. This turned out to be immensely popular play, and played a principal role in popularising Communism in Kerala in the fifties.

During his legal career, he appeared in over 500 criminal cases. At the time of the 2003 Marad riots, he defended over 100 accused. G. Janaradha Kurup worked as Special Public Prosecutor in several criminal cases, including the Suriyanelli rape case.

G. Janaradha Kurup was a Kerala Sahitya Akademi award winner.
