= Civic Chandran =

Indian playwright

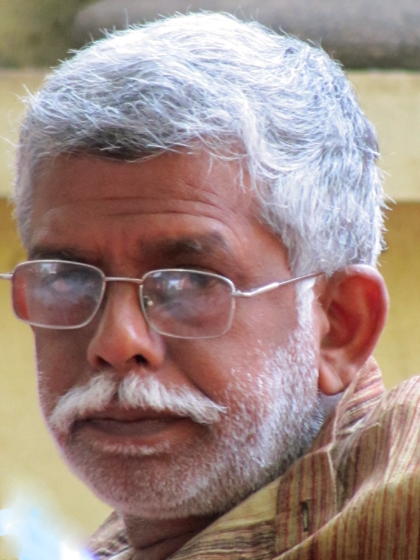
- Born: C. V. Kuttan; 5 April 1951 (age 75); Murikungal, Trichur district, Travancore-Cochin
- Occupations: Teacher, writer, editor, activist
- Spouse: P. Sridevi
- Children: 2
- Writing career
- Language: Malayalam

Civic Chandran (born 5 April 1951) is an Indian playwright, poet, editor, former Naxalite, social activist and political commentator from Kerala. He is the editor of Patabhedam magazine. He was instrumental in popularising street theatre in Kerala and is a strong critic of Kerala's mainstream left.

== Life ==
He was born on 5 April 1951 in Murikungal village near Kodakara in Trichur district. He was the eldest of four children born to Velappan and Lakshmi. His birth name was C. V. Kuttan. From 1968 to 1981, he worked as a teacher in Wayanad and Eranad. In 1981, he was suspended from the job on charges of Naxalite links. Following the acquittal by the High Court, he returned to teaching in 1991. Now retired, he lives in West Hill, Calicut. He was married to P. Sridevi, who died some years before. There were two daughters from the marriage.

In July 2022, a complaint was lodged against Civic Chandran for sexually assaulting a woman activist.

== Career ==
Civic was a member of the editorial board of Yanan magazine. This magazine was later confiscated by the government. He was imprisoned during the Emergency. He edited an anthology of poems titled Thadavara Kavithakal (Poems from Prison). He notes that political prisoners like him started to write poems in prison as part of survival and resistance.

Civic was the secretary of Janakiya Samskarika Vedi and editor of its mouthpiece Prerana. Civic was instrumental in popularising street theatre in Kerala. The magazines Vakku and Patabhedam were published under his leadership. In 1995, he staged the play Ningal Aare Communist Akki (Who did you make a communist), a counter drama based on Thoppil Bhasi's Ningal Enne Communist Akki (You made me a communist). The play sparked off a storm by taking an unsparing look at mainstream communism, calling it anti-Dalit and patriarchal. The play also led to the Civic Chandran v. Ammini Amma case, a landmark case in Indian copyright law.

Civic is a regular columnist in magazines and newspapers and writes about cultural issues. Civic is a distinct voice in Kerala's cultural arena, often clashing with and opposing the traditional left. He handled columns in Madhyamam and India Today. He is now the editor of Pathabhedam magazine.

== Works ==
Poetry

- Thadavara Kavithakal (ed.)
- Velichathekurichoru Gitam
- Griha Pravesam
- Valathuvasam Chernnu Nadakkuka (2017)

Plays

- Kurisu Yuddham Thudangunnavar
- Thamrapathrangal (Akshouhini)
- Ningal Aare Communist Akki
- Ezhupathukalil Sambhavichath
- Agnaye Idam Na Mama
- Ningal Enthinanu Ente Kuttiye Perumazhayathu Nirthiyirikunath (2012)

Essays

- Antennayil Kattu Pidikkumpol
- Karinkanna Nokkanda (2001)
- Gamayude Paitrukam

Memoirs

- Ezhupathukal Vilichappol (2009)
