= Society of Composers, Authors and Music Publishers of Canada v Bell Canada =

Society of Composers, Authors and Music Publishers of Canada v. Bell Canada
- Supreme Court of Canada

Hearing: December 6, 2011 Judgment: July 12, 2012
- Citations: 2012 SCC 36
- Prior history: Appeal from the Federal Court of Appeal, 2010 FCA 123
- Ruling: Appeal dismissed.

Court membership
- Chief Justice: Beverley McLachlin; Puisne Justices: Louis LeBel, Marie Deschamps, Morris Fish, Rosalie Abella, Marshall Rothstein, Thomas Cromwell, Michael Moldaver, Andromache Karakatsanis

Reasons given
- Unanimous reasons by: Abella J

Society of Composers, Authors and Music Publishers of Canada (SOCAN) v. Bell Canada, [2012] 2 SCR 326, 2012 SCC 36 is a leading Canadian case on the application of fair dealing under s. 29 of the Copyright Act. It pertained to the use of previews of musical works on online music services that sell digital files of musical works.

== Background and facts ==
SOCAN is the collective society in Canada representing the administration and collection of royalties for the performance and communication rights of composers, authors and music publishers. Bell Canada, Apple Canada, Rogers Communications, Rogers Wireless Partnership, Shaw Cablesystems G.P., and TELUS Communications Inc. operate online music services that sell downloads of digital files of musical works. These service providers allow consumers to listen to free 30–90 second previews for those musical works before making a purchase. These previews constitute an online stream (i.e. a temporary transmission of an excerpt of the musical work). The consumer's computer does not store a permanent copy of the preview, but consumers can listen to the previews as many times as they want, regardless of whether they make a purchase or have registered with the online service provider. SOCAN filed proposed tariffs with the Copyright Board of Canada for the determination of royalties to be paid by users when musical works are communicated to the public over the Internet.

In its decision released on October 18, 2007, the Copyright Board agreed that SOCAN is entitled to royalties for the downloading of musical works, but not for previews, since previews constitute fair dealing for the purpose of research under s.29 of the Copyright Act and thus do not amount to copyright infringement. The Federal Court of Appeal upheld the Copyright Board's decision. SOCAN appealed to the Supreme Court of Canada.

== Issue ==
The issue addressed was whether allowing consumers to preview musical works before making a purchase on commercial websites that sell music constitutes “fair dealing” under s.29 of the Copyright Act.

== Holding ==
The Supreme Court of Canada unanimously upheld the Copyright Board's decision that the use of previews of musical works on commercial music websites amounts to fair dealing under s.29 of the Copyright Act. Therefore, these previews do not entitle SOCAN to royalties.

== Reasons of the Court ==
The Court applied the test for fair dealing set out in CCH Canadian Ltd. v. Law Society of Upper Canada, [2004] 1 SCR 339. It reaffirmed that fair dealing must not be interpreted restrictively, because allowing users to engage in some activities that would otherwise constitute copyright infringement supports the achievement of the proper balance, set out in Théberge v. Galerie d'Art du Petit Champlain Inc., 2002 SCC 34, between promoting the public interest in the encouragement and dissemination of works (access) and obtaining a just reward for the creator (protection).

The first stage of the fair dealing analysis requires that the previews be for the purpose of research, private study, criticism, review or news reporting. The Court clarified that it is the perspective of the user of the preview, not that of the online service provider, that is relevant at this stage of the inquiry, as fair dealing is a user's right. It also confirmed that the first stage of the analysis constitutes a relatively low threshold, so that the in-depth analysis takes place at the second stage when determining whether the dealing is fair.

The Court concluded that the consumers' use of previews of musical works constitutes research, with respect to authenticity and quality, for the purpose of identifying which songs to purchase and therefore satisfies the first step of the fair dealing inquiry. It specified that "research" should be given a "large and liberal interpretation to ensure that users' rights are not unduly constrained" such that "research" is not limited to research for creative purposes, but can include many activities that do not require establishment of new facts or conclusions. Research can be piecemeal, informal, explanatory, confirmatory and simply for personal interest.

The second stage of the fair dealing analysis requires a determination, with the guidance of six factors from CCH, of whether the use of the previews was fair. As these six factors demonstrated that the use of online previews of musical works was fair, the Court found that the second stage of the test for fair dealing was also satisfied.

(i) objective assessment of the purpose behind the use of the copyrighted work

The Court concluded that the purpose behind the use of the previews is to facilitate consumer research. As there are reasonable safeguards to ensure that previews are actually used for this purpose, rather than to replace song itself (e.g. previews are shorter, of lower quality and constitute temporary not permanent copies), it held that this factor still favored fairness even though the research was for a commercial purpose.

(ii) the character of the dealing

The Court found that this factor favored fairness, even though users could listen to the previews as many times as they liked, because no copy of the preview existed for the user after it was heard and multiple copies of the work were not widely distributed.

(iii) the amount of the work taken

The Court assessed the length of the preview in relation to the length of the song and determined that a thirty-second excerpt of a four-minute song constituted a modest dealing and thus favored fairness. The Court rejected SOCAN's argument that this factor should be assessed based on the aggregate amount of previews, rather than the amount of each preview in relation to the whole work. Given the ease and magnitude with which digital works are disseminated over the Internet, focusing on the aggregate amount of the dealing in cases involving digital works would lead to disproportionate findings of unfairness when compared with non-digital works. Such an interpretation would undermine the goal of technological neutrality in copyright law.

(iv) existence of alternatives to the dealing

The Court decided that, since there are no other alternatives for allowing consumers to actually hear what a musical work sounds like and since allowing returns of songs is an expensive, complicated and market-inhibiting alternative to helping users identify the right music, previews of songs are "reasonably necessary" to achieve the ultimate consumer research purpose.

(v) nature of the work:should it be widely disseminated

The parties did not dispute the desirability of the sale and dissemination of musical works. The Court concluded that previews support the purchase and dissemination of songs by facilitating potential consumers' identification of musical works they want to buy, so this factor also supported the fairness of the dealing.

(vi) effect of the dealing on the work : does it compete with or adversely affect the original work?

The Court held that previews do not adversely affect the musical works. If anything, they have a positive effect because they encourage the purchase of songs. The Court also determined that previews do not compete with the musical work because they are shorter, of lower quality and are only temporary streamed copies rather than permanent downloaded copies.

== Reception and aftermath ==
Also released on July 12, 2012, Alberta (Education) v. Canadian Copyright Licensing Agency (Access Copyright) cited SOCAN v. Bell Canada with approval for the propositions that: 1) fair dealing enables user to engage in activities that might otherwise amount to copyright infringement, 2) that fair dealing is a user's right and the relevant perspective at the first stage of the test is that of the user, and 3) that the "amount" factor is not a quantitative assessment based on aggregate use, but rather an examination of the proportion between the excerpted copy and the entire work.

On January 16, 2013, the Copyright Board in Society for Reproduction Rights of Authors, Composers and Publishers in Canada v. Canadian Broadcasting Corp. considered SOCAN v. Bell Canada as having "clarified the Canadian concept of fair dealing, with material consequences in this instance".

SOCAN v. Bell Canada has been interpreted as having "reassess[ed] old shibboleths" and "reorient[ed]" legal understandings" with respect to copyright. Furthermore, its emphasis that fair dealing is a user's right that must interpreted liberally, rather than as a narrow exception "to be grudgingly conceded", has been cited as a basis for why either the American open-ended fair use doctrine or an expanded list of enumerated user rights under s.29 should be adopted in Canada.

Other scholars have deemed the "lasting significance" of SOCAN v. Bell Canada to be its adoption of an expansive definition of "research" under s.29 and its rejection of SOCAN's argument that the music previews simply constitute a search, not research.

== See also ==
- List of Supreme Court of Canada cases (McLachlin Court)
