= Substantial part =

Substantial part may refer to:

- Substantial part (Canadian copyright law), concept in Canadian copyright law
- Substantial part test, test in the United States tax law
