= Civic Chandran v. Ammini Amma =

Indian copyright law case

- Court: Kerala High Court
- Decided: 27 February 1996
- Citation: 16 PTC 329 (Kerala)

Court membership
- Judge sitting: T. V. Ramakrishnan

Keywords
- Copyright law, India, Fair dealing

Civic Chandran v. Ammini Amma is a landmark case in Indian copyright law decided by Kerala High Court in which the judgment held that even substantial copying of copyrighted work is permissible under the fair dealing exception; if the copying is in public interest.

== Facts ==
In 1952, playwright Thoppil Bhasi wrote the play Ningalenne Communistakki. Since then the drama has been staged over 10,000 times and has garnered widespread appreciation. Thoppil Bhasi was an active member of the Communist Party of India and through his play he aimed to garner support for his party as well as to organize the people belonging to the allegedly lower strata of the society in a struggle against oppression, exploitation and poverty in order to bring about a revolution which would result in the victory of the workers. This drama was instrumental in the political victory of the Communist Party of India in Kerala in 1957. All the rights in the play were first vested in Thoppil Bhasi and after his demise, the same were transferred to his legal heirs, who are also the plaintiffs of the present suit. In 1995, Defendant no. 1 wrote a drama called "Ningal Are Communistakki" (hereinafter referred to as the counter-drama). This drama was styled as a counter-drama to the drama written by Thoppil Bhasi and was published in the Malayalam edition of India Today, the owner of which is defendant no. 2, a private company. Defendant no. 3 is the executive director, printer and publisher of the said company. Defendant 4 is the president of "Rangabhasha", a drama troop and defendant no. 5 is the secretary of the same. This drama troop had been making preparations to stage the counter-drama.

The drama contained the following categories of characters:

- Upper class landlords: Vallya Veettil Kesavan Nair is the character representing this class.
- Socially and educationally backward classes
- Workers of the Communist Party: Mala, Karampan, Suman, Gopalan, Mathew and Pappu are characters representing this class.

Mala is the protagonist of the drama and belongs to the most depressed class of people. While initially, Gopalan and Mala were in love with each other, eventually Gopalan fell in love with Suman, the upper caste daughter of VV Kesavan Nair. By the end of the play, Nair is left in a helpless condition as his own blood fell in love with a class he was exploiting and sympathized with them. Furthermore, Paramupilla, Gopalan's father, who was initially against the CPI, joins Mala and the members of the same party. The drama ends with Paramupilla taking the red flag from Mala symbolizing his change of heart. The counter-drama also contains the same characters and 9 scenes as opposed to 14 in the original drama. The opening scene shows the red flag and deals with the failure of the war waged by Mala and the other members. This introductory scene ends with the entry to a character playing Thoppil Bhasi who says that he has come to see the real condition of Mala. The counter-drama then continues and contains many scenes that have been copied from the drama. However, all of these scenes were followed by commentary criticizing the play and had been authored by Defendant no. 1. Furthermore, the stage was divided into two parts- the upper platform and the lower platform. The scenes copied from the drama were enacted on the upper platform, whereas he criticism of it was enacted on the lower platform. The plaintiffs alleged that the counter-drama had infringed upon their copyright in the drama and filed a suit against the defendants. They also prayed for an interlocutory order restraining the staging of the counter-drama. The Additional District Judge who was hearing the suit granted the interlocutory injunction in favor of the plaintiff. The defendants then appealed to the Kerala High Court and beseeched it to set aside the order restraining them from staging the play. This appeal was disposed of by the Kerala High Court in the instant case.

== Main arguments of the plaintiffs/respondents ==
The plaintiffs/respondents alleged that the counter-drama created by Defendant no. 1 contained substantial portions of the drama as well as a reproduction of the characters and dialogues with some mere comments here and there. It was contested by the plaintiff that this was done in order to take "undue advantage of the creative talents and labor of Thoppil Bhasi" which was in violation of the Copyright Act. The defendants argued that since the Additional District Judge did not consider the aspects of balance of convenience and irreparable injury and hence the order passed by him was perverse. Since there was high probability of the defense of fair dealing being applicable in the case, irreparable injury that could have been caused to the defendants should have been taken into consideration. In response to the defendants' contention, the plaintiffs' argued that in an appeal concerning the grant of a temporary injunction in a pending suit, the lower court's decision should not be reversed unless the same is found to be completely illegal and perverse and the same was not the case in the matter before the Court.

== Key issue discussed by the court ==
Whether the use of copyrighted material for preparing a counter-drama can be considered as fair dealing?

== Key aspects of the judgment ==
Since the Indian Copyright Act does not provide a definition of fair dealing, the Court relied heavily on the decision given in Hubbard v Vosper. In that case, Lord Denning had clarified that fair dealing is a question of degree. The number and extent of extracts and quotations and the use made of them need to be given due consideration.

In the instant case, the Court mentioned that three factors are relevant for deciding whether the plaintiffs' rights had been violated:

1. Quantum and value of the matter taken in relation to the comment or criticism
2. The purpose for which it was taken
3. The likelihood of competition between the two

After doing a scene by scene analysis of the counter drama and the drama, the Court reached the conclusion that the scenes and characters were not borrowed from the latter for the purpose of reproduction of the drama in any substantial manner. Moreover, the Court noted that the purpose was not to misappropriate the theme, form of presentation, theme, character, dialogues and the techniques adopted in writing the drama. The aim was not to imitate the drama or to produce anything similar. The real objective of the counter-drama was to criticize the ideology depicted in the drama and to show how the drama had been unsuccessful in achieving the targets it had purported to have aimed for. Moreover, the counter-drama also contained references to popular social and political leaders of Kerala which was not there in the drama. Hence, the Court said that there was enough material in the counter-drama to show that the Defendant had used labor and skill of his own and the differences between the original drama and the counter-drama could not be considered inconsequential. The portions of the original drama which were copied in the counter-drama were taken only to make the criticism more effective. Hence, the Court opined that there was no prima facie case against the defendants as a strong defense is available to them.

The Court also refused to grant the injunction on the ground that the counter-drama leveled unfounded allegations against Thoppil Bhasi, the CPI and its leaders. This rejection was due to the fact that even if the allegation was true, it was not a ground to get injunction for the infringement of copyright. Moreover, keeping in mind the real aim of the counter-drama, an injunction against it would be a restriction on the freedom of expression of the Defendant.

The Court also took note of the fact that there was no competition between the drama and the counter-drama. Likelihood of competition was a relevant consideration as per Hubbard v Vosper and the same was not met in the instant case. Another important factor is the Court's decision that though the counter-drama was published in January, 1995, the suit was instituted in July of the same year, just a day before the day on which the play had to be staged. Though this delay was not considered decisive and fatal, it definitely was a consideration that weighed against the plaintiffs.

Lastly, the Court also noted that the interim injunction would cause irreparable injury to the defendants as they had spent a large amount of money for staging the play. On the other hand, no such irreparable harm would accrue to the plaintiffs as any damage suffered by them in the absence of an injunction could be sufficiently compensated for through the payment of damages.

Hence, the decision of the Additional District Judge was reversed and it was held that even if the copying was of substantial portions, the same could be excused as it constituted fair dealing.

== Significance of the judgment ==
This case can very well be considered a landmark decision on fair dealing in the Indian copyright law. This is especially because of the enumeration of the relevant determining factors. Even though the Court expressly mentioned "quantum and value of the matter taken" as a relevant consideration and performed a meticulous scene by scene analysis of the drama as well as the counter-drama, it did not make any observation on this issue. After carrying out this analysis, it discussed how the purpose of the counter-drama was not to reproduce the drama or to convey the same idea in any substantial manner. Hence, a perfect opportunity to discuss all the relevant considerations was lost by the Court.

This case has been referred to in two judicial decisions till now. In The Chancellor Masters and Scholars of the University of Oxford v. Narendera Publishing House, this case was discussed and followed. This case involved the making of guides by the defendants of the text books published by the plaintiff. On the basis of the four factors mentioned in the US copyright statute and the decision in the instant case, the Indian Courts ruled in favor of the Defendants. The second case is of ICC Development (International) Ltd. v. New Delhi Television Ltd. It merely mentioned the case along with a host of other cases and did not discuss or significantly rely upon it.

== Comparison with US and EU law ==
For a comparative perspective, it is also essential to understand the difference between "fair use" and "fair dealing". In jurisdictions that follow the latter approach, the specific purposes listed down within fair dealing are the only ones for which "fair dealing" is permitted. It cannot be done for any other purpose irrespective of how "fair" the other purpose is. The specific provisions and purposes mentioned within fair dealing are not mere examples of how the judges can enforce the fair dealing exception. Fair use, on the other hand, is much broader in scope as it only provides guidelines using which the Judges can decide whether a particular use is fair or not. This implies that unlike in fair dealing, the fair use exemption is not exhaustive and the Judges are free to use their discretion to permit anything that could qualify as "fair" for them. The fair use approach is followed in the United States whereas the fair dealing approach is followed in India. Understanding the difference between these two is crucial as they define the limits of judicial discretion in copyright cases. Section 107 of the US Copyright statute deals with the fair use limitation. It mentions certain situations to which fair use exception would apply but in doing so it uses the words "purposes such as", thereby making it amply clear that the list is merely indicative and not exhaustive. It also enlists the 4 factors that have to be considered while determining whether the exception would apply. These factors are as follows:

1. the purpose and character of the use, including whether such use is of a commercial nature or is for nonprofit educational purposes
2. the nature of the copyrighted work
3. the amount and substantiality of the portion used in relation to the copyrighted work as a whole
4. the effect of the use upon the potential market for or value of the copyrighted work

None of these 4 factors are decisive and a weighing and balancing of all have to be done. Furthermore, this list of factors is inclusive in nature as is evident from the wordings of the provision. This exception applies to unpublished works as well. Furthermore, the US law has evolved and now mandates that the defendant's work should be transformative which means that it should be different in character and should not be meant to be a replacement.

The corresponding position in the European Union is governed by the Information Society Directive of 2001. Article 5(3) of this Directive mentions 15 purposes for which member states can carve out an exception. Copyright cannot be limited for any other purposes. This is a fair dealing provision. This Directive expressly requires the research or private study for which copyrighted material is used to be of non-commercial nature. Furthermore, in relation to the defense of criticism or review of a work, the Directives mention that the same will be applicable only to those works which have been lawfully made available to the public. Thus, many unpublished work fall beyond the ambit of the protection offered by it. Unlike their US counterparts, these Directives also do not provide a list of factors that need to be considered.

The position in India is closer to that in EU. First, we follow the fair dealing approach and not the fair use approach. Section 52(1)(a) and (b) mention the specific purposes for which fair dealing exception is available. Hence, the Indian law has not given the Judges wide discretion with respect to this. Second, our statute does not lay down the factors that need to be considered while determining whether fair dealing has been done. We rely on judicial decisions for the same. The Indian Courts have frequently relied on Hubbard v Vosper . In the instant case, the Court laid down the relevant factors and tried to follow a factored approach. However, their approach was actually piecemeal as they did not apply one of the factors and gave more than required stress on some other factor. The first factor was not applied here and the second factor was treated as definitive. Such an approach can be seen in other cases as well. For instance, in The Chancellor Masters and Scholars of The University of Oxford v. Narendera Publishing House and Ors. the ultimate question was whether the work was transformative and the other factors were not given the same amount of weight. The above-mentioned case also points out to how the Indian judiciary has adopted the requirement of transformation from the United States.
