= Copyright law of India =

Laws relating to copyright in India

The Copyright Act, 1957 as amended governs the subject of copyright law in India. The Act is applicable from 21 January 1958. The history of copyright law in India can be traced back to its colonial era under the British Empire. The Copyright Act 1957 was the first post-independence copyright legislation in India and the law has been amended six times since 1957. The most recent amendment was in the year 2012, through the Copyright (Amendment) Act 2012.

India is a member of most of the important international conventions governing the area of copyright law, including the Berne Convention of 1886 (as modified at Paris in 1971), the Universal Copyright Convention of 1951, the Rome Convention of 1961 and the Agreement on Trade Related Aspects of Intellectual Property Rights (TRIPS). Initially, India was not a member of the WIPO Copyright Treaty (WCT) and the WIPO Performances and Phonograms Treaty (WPPT) but subsequently entered the treaty in 2013.

== Applicable Copyright Act before 1958 ==
Prior to 21 January 1958, the Indian Copyright Act, 1914, was applicable in India and still applicable for works created prior to 21 January 1958, when the new act came into force. The Indian Copyright Act, 1914 was based on the Imperial Copyright Act 1911 passed by the Parliament of the United Kingdom, but was slightly modified in terms of its application to Indian law. According to this act, the period of copyright for photographs was 50 years from the time it was created (act language is: "the term for which copyright shall subsist in photographs shall be fifty years from the making of the original negative from which the photograph was directly or indirectly derived, and the person who was owner of such negative at the time when such negative was made shall be deemed to be the author of the work, and, where such owner is a body corporate, the body corporate shall be deemed for the purposes of this Act to reside within the parts of His Majesty's dominions to which this Act extends if it has established a place of business within such parts.") For photographs published, before 21 January 1958 in India, the period of copyright is thus 50 years, as for them the old Act is applicable.

== Definition of copyright ==
Copyright is a bundle of rights given by the law to the creators of literary, dramatic, musical and artistic works and the producers of cinematograph films and sound recordings. The rights provided under Copyright law include the rights of reproduction of the work, communication of the work to the public, adaptation of the work and translation of the work. The scope and duration of protection provided under copyright law varies with the nature of the protected work.

In a 2016 copyright lawsuit, the Delhi High Court states that copyright is "not an inevitable, divine, or natural right that confers on authors the absolute ownership of their creations. It is designed rather to stimulate activity and progress in the arts for the intellectual enrichment of the public. Copyright is intended to increase and not to impede the harvest of knowledge. It is intended to motivate the creative activity of authors and inventors in order to benefit the public."

== Duration of copyright protection under the Copyright Act 1957 ==
Literary; dramatic, musical and; artistic works	lifetime of the author + sixty years from the beginning of the calendar year next following the year in which the author dies.
Anonymous and pseudonymous works; Cinematograph films; Sound records; Government work; Public undertakings; International Agencies; photographs	until sixty years from the beginning of the calendar years next following the year in which the work is first published

== Foreign works ==
Copyrights of works of the countries mentioned in the International Copyright Order are protected in India, as if such works are Indian works. The term of copyright in a work shall not exceed that which is enjoyed by it in its country of origin.

== Ownership of copyright under the Copyright Act 1957 ==
The author of a work is generally considered as the first owner of the copyright under the Copyright Act 1957. However, for works made in the course of an author's employment under a "contract of service" or apprenticeship, the employer is considered as the first owner of copyright, in the absence of any agreement to the contrary.

The concept of joint authorship is recognised in Section. 2(z) of the Act which provides that "a work produced by the collaboration of two or more authors in which the contribution of one author is not distinct from the contribution of the other author or authors" is a work of joint authorship. This concept has been elucidated in cases like Najma Heptulla v. Orient Longman Ltd. and Ors.

Section 19 of the Copyright Act 1957 lays down the modes of assignment of copyright in India. Assignment can only be in writing and must specify the work, the period of assignment and the territory for which assignment is made. If the period of assignment is not specified in the agreement, it shall be deemed to be five years and if the territorial extent of assignment is not specified, it shall be presumed to be limited to the territories of India. In a recent judgement (Pine Labs Private Limited vs Gemalto Terminals India Limited), a division bench of the Delhi High Court confirmed this position and held that in cases wherein the duration of assignment is not specified, the duration shall be deemed to be five years and the copyright shall revert to the author after five years.

== Exceptions to copyright infringement in India ==
The Copyright Act 1957 exempts certain acts from the ambit of copyright infringement. Section 52 of Copyright Act, 1957 deal with the Fair Dealing Exceptions.

=== Permissible ===
India follows a hybrid approach that allows:

- fair dealing with any copyrighted work for certain specifically mentioned purposes and
- certain specific activities enumerated in the statute.

=== Permissible use under fair dealing ===
India follows a narrower approach, called fair dealing, towards copyright exceptions compared to American legal concept of fair use. While many people tend to use the term fair use to denote copyright exceptions in India, it is a factually wrong usage, because the correct term for India is fair dealings. While the fair use approach followed in the US can be applied for any kind of uses, the narrower fair dealing approach followed in India is clearly limited towards the purposes of

1. private or personal use, including research, and education,
2. criticism or review,
3. reporting of current events and current affairs, including the reporting of a lecture delivered in public. For example, based on the Indian copyright law, one can use a screenshot or a downloaded image of a copyrighted airport layout (for an ongoing construction, upgrade, or future development plan) for public use. This includes things like for-profit commercial news reporting or on a not-for-profit platform such as Wikipedia. However, be aware that Wikipedia may have its own rules that may or may not restrict this (see Commons:Screenshots and Wikipedia:Uploading images), even if it's permitted under Indian law.

Case law example for permissible use of copyrighted material: While the term fair dealing has not been defined anywhere in the Copyright Act 1957, the concept of 'fair dealing' has been discussed in different judgments, including the decision of the Supreme Court of India in Academy of General Education v. B. Malini Mallya (2009) and the decision of the High Court of Kerala in Civic Chandran v. Ammini Amma.

In September 2016, the Delhi High Court ruled in Delhi University's Rameshwari Photocopy Service shop case, which sold photocopies of chapters from academic textbooks was not infringing on their publisher's copyright, arguing that the use of copyright to "stimulate activity and progress in the arts for the intellectual enrichment of the public" outweighed its use by the publishers to maintain commercial control of their property. However, in December 2016, the ruling was reversed and taken back to court, citing that there were "triable issues" in the case.

=== Permissible use under panorama ===
India's copyright law under Sections 52(s), 52(t), and 52( allows permissible free use of copyrighted material under the Freedom of Panorama (FoP).

- Section 52(s): "the making or publishing of a painting, drawing, engraving or photograph of a work of architecture or the display of a work of architecture" is exempt.
- Section 52(t): similar exemption for sculptures or other works of artistic craftsmanship that are permanently situated in a public place or premises accessible to the public.
- Section 52(u): allows inclusion of such artistic works in cinematograph film, etc., if they are permanently situated in a publicly accessible place; or are incidental/background.

== Remedies available against copyright infringement in India ==
The Copyright Act 1957 provides three kinds of remedies - administrative remedies, civil remedies and criminal remedies. The administrative remedies provided under the statute include detention of the infringing goods by the customs authorities. The civil remedies are provided under Chapter XII of the Copyright Act 1957 and the remedies provided include injunctions, damages and account of profits. The criminal remedies are provided under Chapter XIII of the statute and the remedies provided against copyright infringement include imprisonment (up to 3 years) along with a fine (up to 200,000 Rupees).

Jurisdiction [Place of Suing] Under Copyright Act, 1957 - in 2015 the jurisdiction law regarding copyright violation underwent significant change through the judgement of the Supreme Court in the 2015 case Indian Performing Rights Society Ltd. Vs. Sanjay Dalia – If cause of action has arisen wholly or in part in place where plaintiff resides or is doing business suit has to be filed at such place – Plaintiff cannot drag defendant to far off place under guise that he carries business there also. --- Interpretation of statutes – Mischief Rule – Construction that suppresses even counter mischief has to be adopted.

== See also ==
- Registrar of Copyrights (India)
- National Data Sharing and Accessibility Policy – Government of India

== Bibliography ==
- Das, Jatindra Kumar (2021). Law of Copyright. PHI Learning Pvt. Ltd. ISBN 978-81-948002-1-7.
- The Copyright Act, 1957
