= Padayanivettom =

Padayanivettom Devi Temple
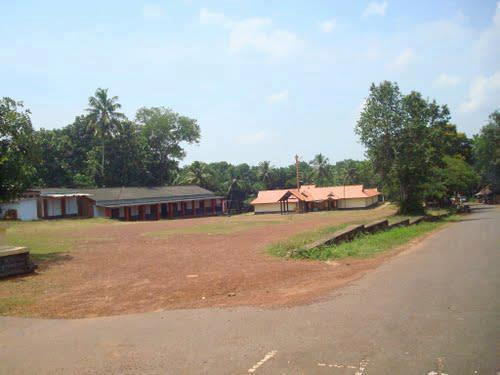

- Padayanivettom Devi Temple, Mavelikkara, Alappuzha, Kerala

Religion
- Affiliation: Hinduism
- District: Alappuzha
- Deity: Devi

Location
- Location: Mavelikkara
- State: Kerala
- Country: India
- Interactive map of Padayanivettom Devi Temple
- Coordinates: 9°09′01.3″N 76°34′43.7″E

Architecture
- Type: Traditional Kerala style
- Completed: Records indicate the temple to be at least 1200 years old

Specifications
- Temple: One
- Elevation: 36.62 m (120 ft)

Website
- www.padayanivettomtemple.com

Padayanivettom Devi temple is a Hindu temple in Kerala. The temple is located at Vallikunnam in Mavelikkara taluk of Alappuzha district in the south Indian state of Kerala. The temple is situated about 10 km south of Mavelikkara, 9 km east of Ochira on NH 47.

== History ==
The Vallikunnam Padayanivettom Devi Temple has been around in service for centuries. In the early times, Kalari Deva's worship was common among the rural people. The worships like Padayani, Thottam pattu, Kalamezhuthu pattu were common for achieving Kalari Deva's favour. Once, during Padayani, a group of people saw two seraphic women in torchlight. This became a common talk among the people. For an explanation of the incident, the people came to the decision for Devaprashna. According to the Devaprashna, it was known that there was presence of Sree Durga Devi and Sree Bhadra Devi in the locality and that the two seraphs were the two devis. It was decided to create temples for the two devis. Since the two seraphs were seen in Padayani's light the place came to be known as Padayanivettom.
