= Krishna Kuchela =

- Poster
- Directed by: Kunchacko
- Produced by: Kunchacko
- Starring: Prem Nazir; T. S. Muthaiah; KPAC Sulochana
- Music by: K. Raghavan
- Production company: Udaya Studios
- Release date: 18 November 1961
- Running time: 140 minutes
- Country: India
- Language: Malayalam

Krishna Kuchela is 1961 Indian Malayalam-language Hindu mythological film directed and produced by Kunchacko. Revolving around the Hindu god Krishna and his childhood friend Kuchela, the film stars Prem Nazir, KPAC Sulochana, Hari, T. S. Muthaiah and Ambika Sukumaran. It was released on 18 November 1961 and became a box-office bomb.

== Plot ==
The story centers on the mythological relationship between Krishna and Kuchela.

== Cast ==
- Prem Nazir as Krishna
- Sathyan
- T. S. Muthaiah as Kuchela
- KPAC Sulochana as Kuchela's wife
- Ragini
- B. S. Saroja

== Soundtrack ==
The music was composed by K. Raghavan and lyrics were written by P. Bhaskaran.

No.	Song	Singers	Lyrics	Length
1	"Aalinte Kombathe"	P. Leela, Jikki, Santha P. Nair	P. Bhaskaran	
2	"Ambadi Thannilorunni"	A. M. Rajah	P. Bhaskaran	
3	"Eppozheppol"	K. Raghavan	P. Bhaskaran	
4	"Hare Krishna" (Venugaanavilola)	Chellan	P. Bhaskaran	
5	"Kaattilekkachyutha"	P. Leela, Jikki	P. Bhaskaran	
6	"Kaithozhaam"	P. Leela, K. Raghavan	P. Bhaskaran	
7	"Kando Kando Kannane"	P. Leela, Chorus, Santha P. Nair	P. Bhaskaran	
8	"Kanninaal"	P. B. Sreenivas	P. Bhaskaran	
9	"Kasthoorithilakam"	K. Raghavan	P. Bhaskaran	
10	"Maamalapolezhum"	P. Leela	P. Bhaskaran	
11	"Marayalle Maayalle Radhe"	K. Raghavan	P. Bhaskaran	
12	"Nanda Nandana"	P. Leela, A. M. Rajah	P. Bhaskaran	
13	"Oamal Kidaangale Odiyodi"	KPAC Sulochana	P. Bhaskaran	
14	"Omanakuttan Govindan"	Santha P. Nair	P. Bhaskaran	
15	"Pattiniyaaluyir Vaadi"	P. B. Sreenivas	P. Bhaskaran	
16	"Pullikkaale"	P. Leela, Santha P. Nair	P. Bhaskaran	
17	"Raareeraaro"	P. Susheela	P. Bhaskaran	
18	"Saakshaal Mahaavishnu"	A. M. Rajah	P. Bhaskaran	
19	"Srishtikaaranakum"	Santha P. Nair	P. Bhaskaran	
20	"Swagatham Swagatham Bhaktha Kuchela"	P. Leela, Jikki, Santha P. Nair	P. Bhaskaran	
21	"Thaamarakannanallo"	P. Leela, Santha P. Nair	P. Bhaskaran	
22	"Varnippathengine"	P. Leela, M. L. Vasanthakumari	P. Bhaskaran	
23	"Vennilavu Poothu"	P. Leela, Jikki, Santha P. Nair	P. Bhaskaran	

== Release and reception ==
Krishna Kuchela was released on 18 November 1961, nine days after another film based on the same story, Bhakta Kuchela. Though Bhakta Kuchela was a box office success, Krishna Kuchela was not. According to historian B. Vijayakumar, "The presence of Prem Nazir as Krishna, T S Muthiah as Kuchela and KPAC Sulochana as Kuchela's wife simply failed to attract viewers to the theatres."
