= Ningalenne Communistakki (film) =

1970 film by Thoppil Bhasi

- Poster
- Directed by: Thoppil Bhasi
- Screenplay by: Thoppil Bhasi
- Based on: Ningalenne Communistakki
- Produced by: Kunchacko
- Starring: Sathyan; Prem Nazir; Sheela; Jayabharathi
- Cinematography: C. Ramachandra Menon
- Music by: G. Devarajan
- Production company: Udaya Pictures
- Distributed by: Excel Productions
- Release date: 11 September 1970
- Country: India
- Language: Malayalam

Ningalenne Communistakki (transl. You made me a communist) is a 1970 Indian Malayalam-language film written and directed by Thoppil Bhasi and produced by Kunchacko. It is based on the play of the same name. The film stars Sathyan, Prem Nazir, Sheela and Jayabharathi in the lead roles. The film had musical score by G. Devarajan. The film was huge hit.

== Plot ==
Paramu Pillai is a farmer struggling to make ends meet. He lives in a small village with his wife Kalyani, son Gopalan and daughter Meenakshi. Gopalan discontinues his college studies and works for the welfare of agricultural laborer's and small-time farmers. Mathew is another leader of the agricultural workers union who supports Gopalan in his activities.

Valiyaveetil Kesavan Nair is the local landlord. He is cruel and makes his workers toil like slaves. Gopalan becomes Kesavan Nair's sworn enemy. Kesavan Nair's daughter Sumavalli is in love with Gopalan.

Kesavan Nair succeeds in taking possession of the holdings of some of the poor farmers in the village. His eye now falls on Paramu Pillai's land. His evil eye also falls on Mala, daughter of Karamban, a small time farmer. Gopalan saves Mala from Nair. Mala takes a liking for Gopalan but withdraws in favour of Sumavalli.

Nair's wicked plans and his anti-labourer attitude are exposed by Gopalan and his followers. Nair decides to take revenge. Gopalan is beaten up and is hospitalised.

Nair succeeds in taking possession of Paramu Pillai's and Karamban's land by using forged title deeds. Paramu Pillai who was always against the policies of his son and his party realises his ignorance. He joins the party procession that moves through the village, holding the Red Flag afloat. The wicked ways, the anti-worker policies of the wealthy turns Paramu Pillai into a Communist

== Cast ==
- Sathyan as Paramu Pilla
- Prem Nazir as Gopalan
- Sheela as Sumavalli
- Jayabharathi as Mala
- Kottayam Chellappan as Valiyaveetil Kesavan Nair
- KPAC Lalitha as Meenakshi
- K. P. Ummer as Mathew
- Thoppil Krishna Pillai as Karamban
- Vijaya Kumari as Kalyani
- Alummoodan as Velu

== Production ==
Most of the plays staged by Kerala Peoples Arts Club, popularly known as KPAC, also became successful in film. Ningalenne Communistakki is based on the play of the same name, which was first staged in 1952.

== Soundtrack ==
All lyrics are written by Vayalar Ramavarma; all music is composed by G. Devarajan.

No.	Title	Artist(s)	Length
1.	"Aikya Munnani"	K. J. Yesudas, P. Madhuri, Choir
2.	"Ambalapparambile"	K. J. Yesudas
3.	"Ellaarum Paadathu"	P. Susheela
4.	"Kothumbuvallam Thuzhanjuvarum"	K. J. Yesudas, P. Leela, P. Madhuri, B. Vasantha
5.	"Neelakkadambin Poovo"	K. J. Yesudas
6.	"Pallanayaarin Theerathil"	P. Susheela, M. G. Radhakrishnan
