= Registrar of Copyrights (India) =

Registrar of Copyrights, Department of Industrial Policy and Promotion, Ministry of Commerce and Industry

Agency overview
- Jurisdiction: Republic of India
- Headquarters: (India) Copyright Office, Plot No. 32, Dwarka, Delhi, 110075
- Agency executive: Hoshiar Singh, Register of Copyrights
- Website: www.copyright.gov.in

The Registrar of Copyrights is the head of the Copyright Office under the Department of Industrial Policy and Promotion of the Ministry of Commerce and Industry and in-charge of implementation of Copyright Act. The appointment of the Registrar is done by the central government. The registrar of copyrights is also the secretary of the copyright board.

== Copyright Office ==
Copyright symbol

Section 9 of the Copyright Act requires for establishment of an office to be called the Copyright Office for the purpose of the Act. The Copyright Office is to be under the immediate control of a Registrar of Copyrights to be appointed by the Central Government, who would act under the superintendence and directions of the Central Government. The Copyright Office has been set up to provide registration facilities to all types of works and is headed by a Registrar of Copyrights and is located at G-30, August Kranti Bhawan Bhikaji Cama Place, New Delhi, 110066. As of October 16, 2019 the Copyright Office has been relocated to IPO (Intellectual Property Office), Plot No. 32, Sector 14, Dwarka, Delhi, 110075 from G-30, August Kranti Bhawan, Bhikaji Cama Place, New Delhi, 110066. The applications for registration of works can be filled at the counter provided at the Copyright Office from 2.30 P.M. to 4.30. P.M. from Monday to Friday. The applications are also accepted by post. On-line registration through “E-filing facility “ has been provided from 8 September 2009, which facilitates the applicants to file applications at the time and place chosen by them.

== Types of Works ==
The types of work Copyright office is involved with includes:

1. Artistic Work
2. Literary Work
3. Software
4. Music
5. Sound Recording
6. Cinematograph films
7. Lyric
8. Lyric Book
9. Story Book
10. Story Themes
