= K. P. A. C. Sulochana =

Indian theatre actress and playback singer(1938–2005)

- Born: Sulochana; 10 April 1938; Kayamkulam/Mavelikara, Alappuzha, Kerala
- Died: 17 April 2005 (aged 67); Kayamkulam, India
- Occupations: Actress, playback singer
- Awards: Kerala Sangeetha Nataka Akademi Award; Kerala Sangeetha Nataka Akademi Fellowship

K. P. A. C. Sulochana (10 April 1938 – 17 April 2005) was a popular Indian Malayalam playback singer, theatre and film actress from Kerala. She was the famous singer in Kayamkulam KPAC. She has won several awards including the Kerala Sangeetha Nataka Akademi Award and Kerala Sangeetha Nataka Akademi Fellowship. She has also wrote a book called Arangile Anubhavangal.

== Biography ==
KPAC Sulochana was famous singer in Kayamkulam. She was born on 10 April 1938 as the daughter of Kunju Kunj and Kalyaniamma in Mavelikkara. She entered the professional drama through Balalokam programme in Thiruvananthapuram Akashvani. Sulochana started her career at Kerala People's Arts Club (K. P. A. C.) in 1951 with the play Ente Makan Aanu Sheri (My son is right). She acted and sang in 10 plays ranging from Ningalenne Communistakki to Manvantaram. Sulochana left K. P. A. C. after the split of the Communist Party in 1964. Later, she sang in the plays of various committees and acted in leading roles in them. She formed a theatre committee under the name Samskara and presented about 10 plays.

Sulochana entered the Malayalam film industry by singing the duet song "Ee Malar Poikail" with K. S. George in the movie Kaalam Maarunnu. She also played the role of the heroine in the same film opposite Sathyan. Later she sang two more songs when the famous novel Randitangazi was made into a film. Her other films include Arappavan and Krishnakuchela. Sulochana died on 17 April 2005 at the age of 67. She was survived by her husband Kamaleshan.
