= CCH Canadian Ltd v Law Society of Upper Canada =

- Supreme Court of Canada

Hearing: November 10, 2003 Judgment: March 4, 2004
- Full case name: CCH Canadian Ltd., Thomson Canada Limited c.o.b. as Carswell Thomson Professional Publishing, and Canada Law Book Inc. v. Law Society of Upper Canada
- Citations: [2004] 1 SCR 339, 2004 SCC 13, 236 DLR (4th) 395, 30 CPR (4th) 1, 247 FTR 318
- Docket No.: 29320
- Prior history: Judgment for the publishers in the Federal Court of Appeal

Court membership
- Chief Justice: Beverley McLachlin; Puisne Justices: Frank Iacobucci, John C. Major, Michel Bastarache, Ian Binnie, Louise Arbour, Louis LeBel, Marie Deschamps, Morris Fish

Reasons given
- Unanimous reasons by: McLachlin C.J.

Laws applied
- Copyright Act, RSC 1985, c C-42

CCH Canadian Ltd v Law Society of Upper Canada [2004] 1 S.C.R. 39, 2004 SCC 13 is a landmark Supreme Court of Canada case that established the threshold of originality and the bounds of fair dealing in Canadian copyright law. A group of publishers sued the Law Society of Upper Canada for copyright infringement providing photocopy services to researchers. The Court unanimously held that the Law Society's practice fell within the bounds of fair dealing.

== Background ==
Since 1954 the Law Society of Upper Canada, a statutory, non-profit organization, offered request-based photocopying services to students, members, the judiciary, and authorized researchers at their Great Library at Osgoode Hall. The Law Society provided single copies of legal articles, statutes, and decisions to those who requested them. It also allowed visitors to the Great Library to use photocopiers to make individual copies of works held by the library.,

Three of the largest publishers of legal sources, CCH Canadian Limited, Carswell Thomson Professional Publishing and Canada Law Book Inc., sued the Law Society for copyright infringement of 11 specific works based on these activities. They requested relief in the form a declaration of subsistence of copyright in these works and a permanent injunction barring the Great Library from reproducing these works or any other works published by the plaintiffs.

In response, the Law Society argued that the services it offered were necessary to provide equal access to the library's collection of legal materials. Many of the materials held at the library are non-circulating, which makes access to the original copies difficult to those who do not work near-by. The Law Society sought a declaration that its activities did not infringe on the publishers' copyrights, by either the provision of a single copy of a work or by allowing patrons to avail themselves of the self-service photocopiers.

== Ruling ==
The unanimous judgment of the Court was delivered by Chief Justice McLachlin. The Court held that the Law Society did not infringe any copyright when single copies of decisions, statutes, regulations, etc. were made by the library or by its patrons using photocopiers to do similarly.

In reaching its ruling, the Court needed to rule on four questions:

1. Were the publishers' materials "original works" protected by copyright?
2. Did the Great Library authorize copyright infringement by maintaining self-service photocopiers and copies of the publishers' works for its patrons' use?
3. Were the Law Society's dealings with the publishers' works "fair dealing[s]" under s. 29 of the Copyright Act?
4. Did Canada Law Book consent to have its works reproduced by the Great Library?

The Court also considered whether the Law Society infringed on copyrights by providing a fax service, and whether the Great Library qualified under the Library exemption. With respect to these considerations, the Court considered four sub-issues:

1. Did the Law Society's fax transmissions of the publishers' works constitute communications "to the public" within s. 3(1)(f) of the Copyright Act so as to constitute copyright infringement?
2. Did the Law Society infringe copyright by selling copies of the publishers' works contrary to s. 27(2) of the Copyright Act?
3. Does the Law Society qualify for an exemption as a "library, archive or museum" under ss. 2 and 30.2(1) of the Copyright Act?
4. To the extent that the Law Society has been found to infringe any one or more of the publishers' copyrighted works, are the publishers entitled to a permanent injunction under s. 34(1) of the Copyright Act?

=== Subsistence of copyright ===
In relation to the first issue, the Court looked at what is considered the meaning of "original work". Chief Justice McLachlin first remarked that copyright does not protect ideas, but rather their expression. In comparison with the similar US Supreme Court case of Feist Publications Inc. v. Rural Telephone Service, McLachlin rejected Justice O'Connor's "minimal degree of creativity" test but agreed with her assessment of the "sweat of the brow" approach and found it too low a requirement.

Instead, McLachlin took the middle ground by requiring "that an original work be the product of an exercise of skill and judgment" where "skill" is "the use of one's knowledge, developed aptitude or practised ability in producing the work" and "judgment" is "the use of one's capacity for discernment or ability to form an opinion or evaluation by comparing different possible options in producing the work". As well, "[t]he exercise of skill and judgment required to produce the work must not be so trivial that it could be characterized as a purely mechanical exercise." Importantly, it is required that the work "must be more than a mere copy of another work." However, "creativity is not required to make a work 'original'."

In concluding that all eleven works were protected by copyright, she noted that the creation of headnotes, summaries, and topical indices involved sufficient exercise of skill and judgment so as to render them "original" works. However, she also noted that the judgments themselves were not copyrightable, nor were the typographical corrections done by the editors sufficient to attract copyright protection.

=== Authorization ===
The second issue was whether, by providing library patrons with access to photocopiers, the library was implicitly authorizing copyright infringement. McLachlin dismissed this argument by stating that providing access to a machine that could be used to infringe copyright does not suggest sufficient "authorization" to violate copyright. It is presumed that a patron with access to the machines would use them lawfully. However the presumption can be rebutted by evidence that shows "a certain relationship or degree of control existed between the alleged authorizer and the persons who committed the copyright infringement". The publishers presented no such evidence. The fact that the library posted a notice to patrons stating that photocopiers should not be used to infringe on copyrights was not an acknowledgment that such infringement occurred. Finally, the Law Society did not have direct control of its patrons, as with a master-servant relationship, and therefore could not be said that it exercised control over its patrons.

=== Fair dealing ===
The third issue dealt with the scope of "fair dealing" and more specifically what constitutes "research" under s. 29 of the Copyright Act.

McLachlin noted that fair dealing was to be regarded as an "integral part" of the Copyright Act rather than "simply a defence". The fair dealing exceptions were characterized as a user right, and must be balanced against the rights of copyright owners.

When claiming "fair dealing" the defendant must show that 1) the dealing was for the purpose of either research or private study and that 2) it was fair.

In interpreting "research" the Court stated that it "must be given a large and liberal interpretation in order to ensure that users' rights are not unduly constrained." Consequently, it is not limited to private and non-commercial contexts. Therefore, the library made the copies for research purposes.

McLachlin then examined the meaning of "fair" in the contexts of "dealings". She cited Lord Denning in Hubbard v. Vosper when he described fair dealing as being a "question of degree" that cannot be defined concretely. She followed this by adopting the reasoning of Linden JA, which incorporated English and US views, in defining six factors to determine fairness:

1. The purpose of the dealing
2. The character of the dealing
3. The amount of the dealing
4. Alternatives to the dealing
5. The nature of the work
6. The effect of the dealing on the work

In application of these factors to the facts McLachlin found that, given the restrictions put in place by the Law Society for copying the materials, the library was acting fairly. She also found that the library could rely on its general practice to establish fair dealing, and was not required to show that all patrons used the material in a fair way.

In referencing Théberge v. Galerie d'Art du Petit Champlain inc., McLachlin emphasized the importance of balancing "the public interest in promoting the encouragement and dissemination of works of the arts and intellect and obtaining a just reward for the creator." She also clarified that "fair dealing" does not provide merely a defense which removes liability, but instead defines the outer boundaries of copyright and grants a right to the user.

=== Consent ===
Given her ruling that the Law Society's actions were fair, McLachlin declined answering the fourth issue.

=== Legality of fax transmissions ===
McLachlin concluded that a single fax transmission to a single recipient was not a "transmission to the public" within the meaning of the copyright law.

=== Sale of materials ===
For the sale of a copy of copyrighted materials to involve secondary infringement, it must be shown that "(1) the copy must be the product of primary infringement; (2) the secondary infringer must have known or should have known that he or she is dealing with a product of infringement; and (3) the secondary dealing must be established; that is, there must have been a sale." Since McLachlin ruled that the copy was fair and therefore was not a product of primary infringement, the sale of the materials could not involve secondary infringement.

=== Library exemption ===
"In order to qualify as a library, the Great Library: (1) must not be established or conducted for profit; (2) must not be administered or controlled by a body that is established or conducted for profit; and (3) must hold and maintain a collection of documents and other materials that is open to the public or to researchers." Since McLachlin already concluded the library's dealings were fair, she did not need to rule on this issue. Regardless, she determined that the Great Library would have qualified for the library exemption.

=== Injunctive relief ===
Since the Great Library was found not to have infringed on copyrighted material, no determination was made as to whether the Court of Appeals was correct in denying injunctive relief.

== See also ==
- List of Supreme Court of Canada cases (McLachlin Court)
- Feist Publications Inc. v. Rural Telephone Service (1991), a similar US case dealing with the threshold of originality
- Williams & Wilkins Co. v. United States (1973), a similar US case dealing with fair use
- Society of Composers, Authors and Music Publishers of Canada v. Bell Canada, 2012 SCC 36, a later case clarifying fair dealing in the context of streamed music
- Alberta (Education) v Canadian Copyright Licensing Agency (Access Copyright), 2012 SCC 37, a later case applying the fair dealing provisions to photocopied textbooks in public schools
