= Vallikunnam =

- village
- Location in Kerala, India Vallikunnam (India)
- Coordinates: 9°7′0″N 76°32′0″E
- Country: India
- State: Kerala
- District: Alappuzha

Population (2011)
  - Total: 30,394

Languages
  - Official: Malayalam, English
- Time zone: UTC+5:30 (IST)
- PIN: 690501
- Telephone code: 0479-2335xxx
- Vehicle registration: KL 31
- Nearest city: Kayamkulam
- Lok Sabha constituency: Mavelikkara
- Vidhan Sabha constituency: Mavelikara

Vallikunnam is a village in Mavelikara taluk of Alappuzha district in the Indian state of Kerala.

== Description ==
It is the southernmost place in Alappuzha, bordering Oachira and Thazhava of Kollam districts. It is an area of paddy and sesame fields, as well as rubber and tapioca cultivation. Due to abundance of clay, this area has many mud brick factories. It has many higher secondary schools, a public health center, panchayat and village offices, temples and mosques. Amrita HSS Higher Secondary School, and K.K.M. Govt. V.H.S.S, Elippakulam, (Kambisseri Karunakaran Memorial Government Vocational & Higher Secondary School) are two major schools. Padayanivettom temple, Vattackad Temple, Pariyarathukulangara temple, Kanjippuzha Muslim Jama-ath, Pallikkutty, Choonad town musjid, Kanjippuzha Valya Palli are religious sites located in Vallikunnam. Edayasseril Bhadrakali Maha Kshetram is partly located in Vallikunnam and Bharanikkavu panchayat. The village is situated en route Mavelikkara–Karunagappally road and Oachira–Thamarakkulam road. Manackad is the administrative center, Choonad —a fast developing city— and Kambisseri are the main commercial centers. They are connected to Kayamkulam, Mavelikkara, Karunagappally, Adoor, Sasthamkotta and other nearby towns.

== Demographics ==
As of the 2011 Indian census, Vallikunnam had a population of 30,394 with 14,027 males and 16,367 females.

=== Notable people ===
Vallikunnam is the birthplace of Thoppil Bhasi, Kambisseri Karunakaran, the poet Puthussery Ramachandran, Ex-MP C. S. Sujatha
