= Kerala People's Arts Club =

Theatrical movement in Kerala

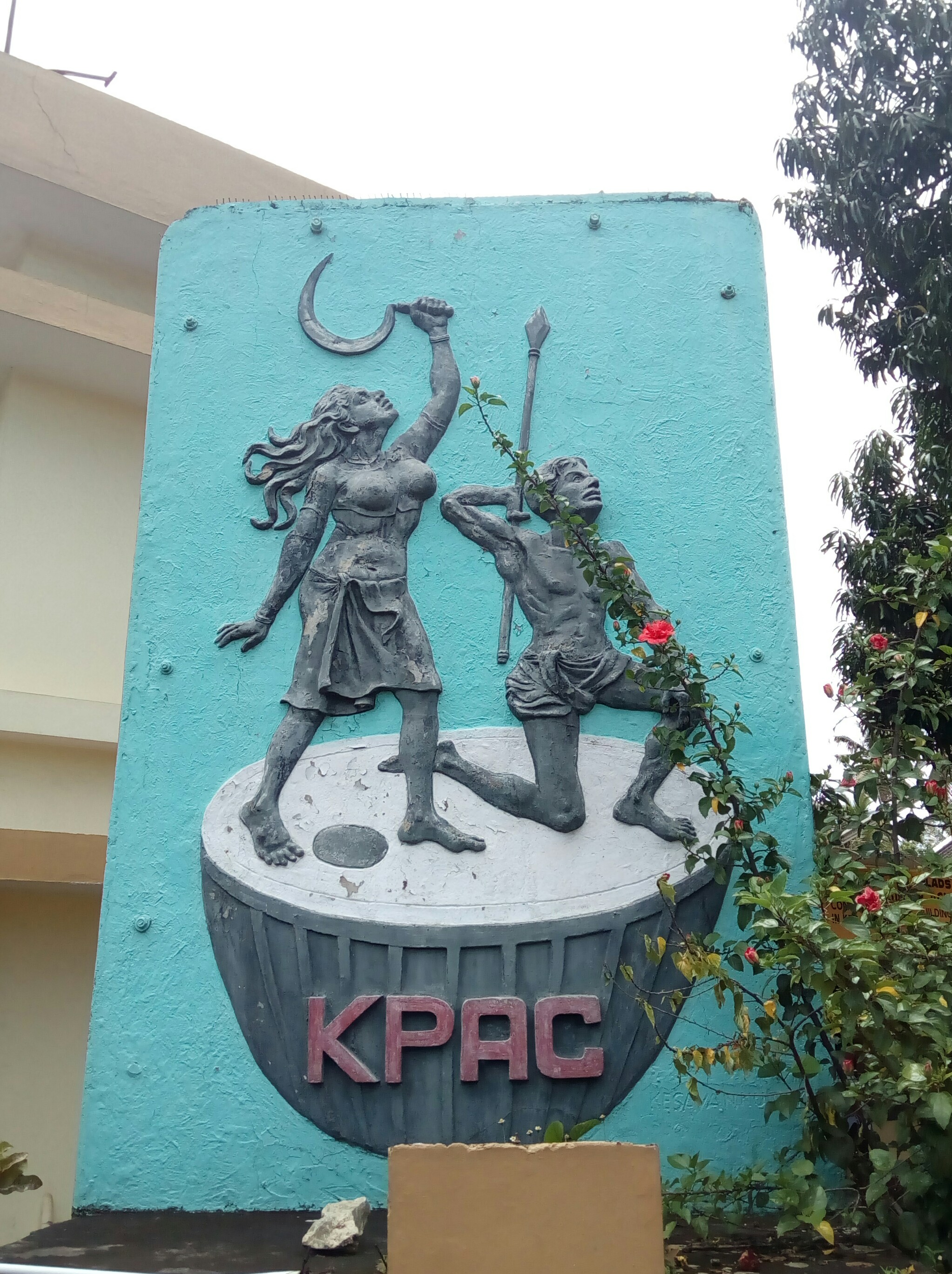
- Abbreviation: K. P. A. C
- Founded: 1950; 76 years ago
- Founder: Kambisseri Karunakaran
- Location: Kayamkulam, Kerala, India
- Region served: Kerala
- Field: Drama, Film
- President: Kanam Rajendran
- Secretary: A. Shajahan
- Affiliations: Communist Party of India

Kerala People's Arts Club, abbreviated as KPAC, is a theatrical movement in Kayamkulam, Kerala, India. It was formed in the 1950s by a group of individuals having close ties with the Communist Party of India in Kerala. KPAC helped popularise the Communist movement in Kerala.

In 1951, KPAC staged its first drama, Ente Makanaanu Sheri (My Son is Right). The songs of this play were written by Punaloor Balan. Its second drama Ningalenne Communistakki (You Made Me a Communist), first performed in 1952, was penned by playwright Thoppil Bhasi under the pseudonym Soman. Bhasi was in political exile when he wrote the play. The success of Ningalenne Communistakki brought KPAC to the forefront of a people's theatre movement in Kerala.

KPAC played a role in popularising the Communist Party in Kerala through its dramas, road shows and kathaprasangams (story telling).

== Notable people ==
- K. P. A. C. Lalitha
- K. P. A. C. Azeez
- K. P. A. C. Sunny
- K. P. A. C. Sulochana
- K. P. A. C. Leela
- K. P. A. C. Beatrice

== Plays ==
Title	Year	Writer
Ente Makanaanu Sheri	1951	G. Janardhana Kurup, N. Rajagopalan Nair
Ningalenne Comunistakki	1952	Thoppil Bhasi
Surveykallu		Thoppil Bhasi
Shudhikalasham	2011	
Puthiya Aakasham Puthiya Bhoomi		Thoppil Bhasi
Sharashayya		Thoppil Bhasi
Yudhakaandam		Thoppil Bhasi
Mudiyanaya Puthran		Thoppil Bhasi
Aswamedham		Thoppil Bhasi
Mooladhanam		Thoppil Bhasi
Irumbumara		Thoppil Bhasi
Koottukudumbam		Thoppil Bhasi
Thulabharam		Thoppil Bhasi
Innale Innu Nalle		Thoppil Bhasi
Manasaputhri		Kaniyapuram Ramachandran
Udyogaparvam		Vaikom Chandrasekharan Nair
Yanthram Sudarshanam		A. N. Ganesh
Bharatha Kshethram		A. N. Ganesh
Manvantharam		N. N. Pillai
Enniku Maranmilla		Kaniyapuram Ramachandran
Sahasrayogam		Sreemoolanagaram Vijayan
Layanam		A. N. Ganesh
Bhagavan Kaalu Maarunnu		Kaniyapuram Ramachandran
Kayyum Thalayum Purathidaruthu		Thoppil Bhasi
Simham Urangunna Kaadu		S. L. Puram Sadanandan
Sookshikkuka Edathuvasham Povuka		Thoppil Bhasi
Visha Sarppathinu Vilakku Vaykkaruthu		P. S. Kumar
Mrishchaghadikam		Thoppil Bhasi
Panchali		Thoppil Bhasi
Bhagnabhavanam		N. Krishna Pillai
Mukkuvanum Bhoothavum		P. S. Kumar
Shaakunthalam		Thoppil Bhasi
Rajini		Thoppil Bhasi
Soothradhaaran		K.T. Mohammed
Thaapanilayam		K. Bhaskaran
Kanyaka		N. Krishna Pillai
Jeevaparyantham		K.T. Mohammed
Olivile Ormmakal		Thoppil Bhasi
Pendulum		K.T. Mohammed
Naalkkavala		K.T. Mohammed
Thaalatharangam		T. R. Hari
Manusiante Manifesto		N. N. Pillai
Rajayogam		Thikkodiyan
Sabko Sanmathi de Bhagwaan		Kaniyapuram Ramachandran
Maanaveeyam		M. G. Soman
Raja Ravi Varma		Francis T. Mavelikkara
Adhinivesham		K. Bhaskaran
Pralayam		K. T. Mohammed
Innalekalile Aakasham		Francis T. Mavelikkara
Draavida Vruthram		Francis T. Mavelikkara
Thamas		Sasidharan Naduvil
Neethipeedam		Pradeep Mandur
Asthamikkaatha Suryan		Francis T. Mavelikkara
Nagara Vishesham		Francis T. Mavelikkara
Bheemasenan		Francis T. Mavelikkara

*Content in this edit is translated from the existing Malayalam Wikipedia article at [[:fr:കെ.പി.എ.സി.]]; see its history for attribution.
