= Puthupally Raghavan =

Puthuppally Raghavan
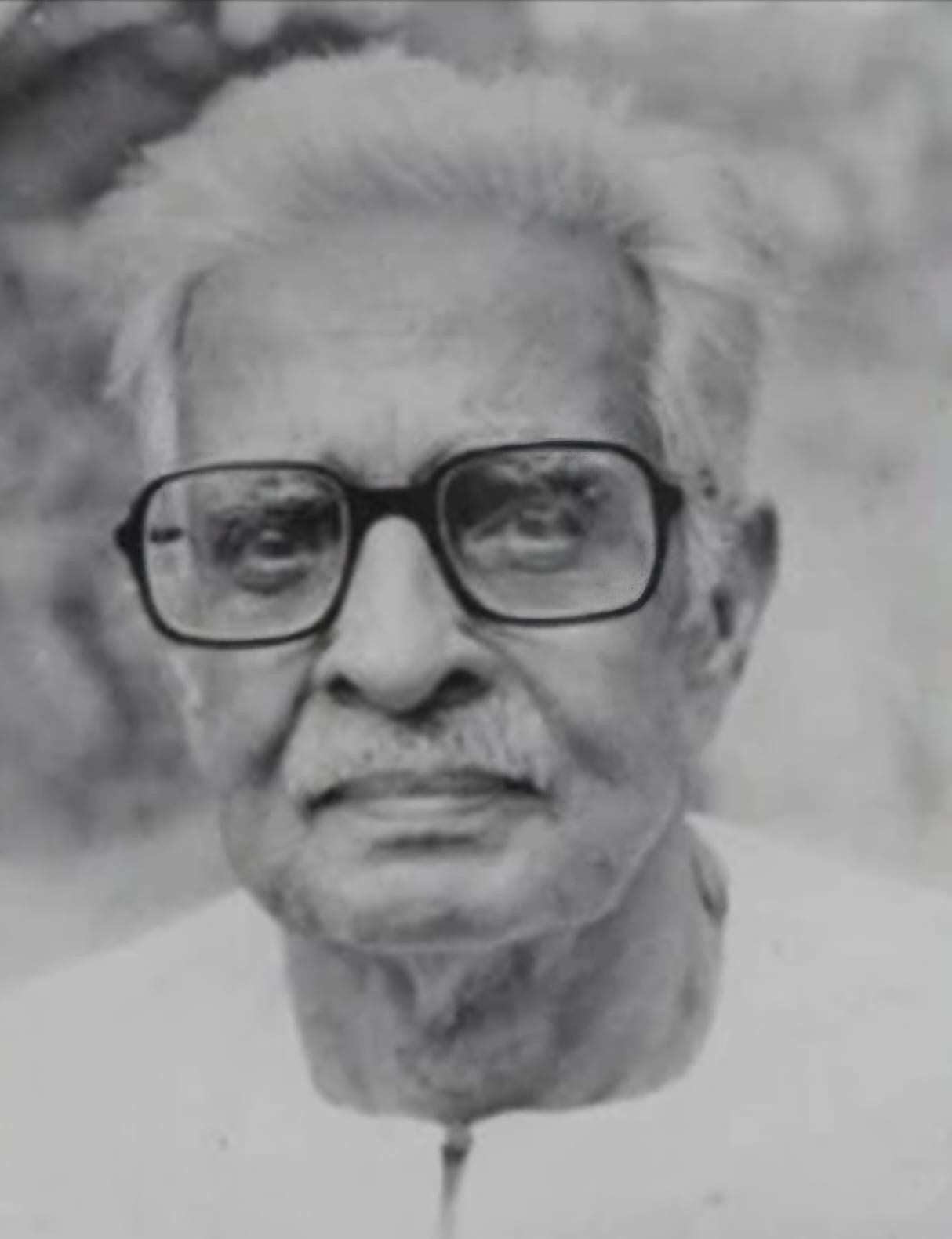
- Occupations: Freedom fighter, writer

Puthuppally Raghavan (1910–2000) was an Indian freedom fighter, writer and communist activist from the state of Kerala, India.

== Political life ==
Raghavan was an active participant in the Indian freedom struggle. He was a member of travancore state congress and the youth league. Later he was attracted to communist ideologies and played a key role in organising the Communist party of India in the Principality of Travancore. He was jailed many times for his activities.

His autobiography is titled Viplava Smaranakal.

== Works ==
- Kerala pathrapravarthana charithram
- Kaneerinteyum chorayudeyum Kathakal
- Indian viplavathinte ithihaasam
