= Alberta (Education) v Canadian Copyright Licensing Agency (Access Copyright) =

- Supreme Court of Canada

Hearing: December 7, 2011 Judgment: July 12, 2012
- Citations: 2012 SCC 37
- Prior history: Appeal from the Federal Court of Appeal, 2010 FCA 198
- Ruling: Appeal allowed. Decision remanded to the Copyright Board

Court membership
- Chief Justice: Beverley McLachlin; Puisne Justices: Louis LeBel, Marie Deschamps, Morris Fish, Rosalie Abella, Marshall Rothstein, Thomas Cromwell, Michael Moldaver, Andromache Karakatsanis

Reasons given
- Majority: Abella J., joined by McLachlin C.J., LeBel, Moldaver and Karakatsanis JJ.
- Dissent: Rothstein J., joined by Deschamps Fish and Cromwell JJ.

Alberta (Education) v Canadian Copyright Licensing Agency (Access Copyright) [2012] 2 SCR 345, 2012 SCC 37 is a Supreme Court of Canada case that considered whether the photocopying of textbook excerpts by teachers, on their own initiative, to distribute to students as part of course materials is fair dealing pursuant to the provisions of the Copyright Act. The Supreme Court, in a 5/4 split, concluded that the Copyright Board made several errors in its analysis of the "fairness factors". Thus, it allowed the appeal and remitted the matter back to the Copyright Board for reconsideration.

== Background and facts ==
Access Copyright represents authors and publishers of literary and artistic works. The entity administers the reproduction of such works by issuing licences and collecting and distributing royalties to affiliated copyright owners. When licensing or royalty agreements with users of the printed works cannot be reached, Access Copyright has the option to apply to the Copyright Board (the "Board") to certify a royalty in a form of a tariff.

Teachers in elementary and secondary schools across Canada frequently make photocopies of excerpts from textbooks and other published works that form Access Copyright's collection. Access Copyright wanted to revise the royalty scheme in the agreements as between the provinces and the Ontario School Boards (the "Coalition"). When the Coalition opposed the scheme, Access Canada applied to the Board for a proposed tariff.

Although the copies made at the teachers' initiative for student instruction fell under the allowable purpose of "research or private study", the Board concluded that they did not constitute fair dealing and were therefore subject to a royalty. On judicial review, the Federal Court of Appeal upheld the Copyright Board's conclusion that the copies were not fair dealing.

The Coalition appealed the fair dealing issue to the Supreme Court maintaining that the Board's conclusion was not in accordance with the test in CCH Canadian Ltd. v. Law Society of Upper Canada, [2004] 1 SCR 339 and was therefore unreasonable.

== Issue ==
The issue in the appeal was whether the photocopies made by the teachers of the excerpts in the textbooks was considered fair dealing.

== Holding ==
The majority, McLachlin CJ and Abella, LeBel, Moldaver and Karakatsanis JJ, agreed with the Coalition and remanded the matter to the Board for reconsideration. The dissent, Deschamps, Fish, Rothstein and Cromwell JJ, held that there was no reviewable error made by the Board and that the appeal should not be allowed.

== Analysis by the majority ==
The concept of fair dealing allows users to engage in some activities that might otherwise be considered copyright infringement. CCH articulated a two-step test for fair dealing. The first is to determine whether the dealing is for the allowable purpose of "research or private study", "criticism or review", or "news reporting" under the Copyright Act. The second step assesses whether the dealing is "fair". A number of fairness factors are used to help courts determine if the dealing is "fair": the purpose, character, and amount of the dealing; the existence of any alternatives to the dealing; the nature of the work; and the effect of the dealing on the work. The person invoking the doctrine of "fair dealing" bears onus to satisfy all aspects of the test.

There was no dispute that the photocopying was for the allowable purpose of "research" or "private study". Rather, the dispute centered on the Board's application of the six CCH factors in the second step of the test.

=== Purpose of the dealing ===
Abella J, writing for the majority, said that the Board misapplied this factor. The Board concluded that the photocopies were not for the purpose of "research" or "private study" because they were not requested by the student and that the predominant purpose was that of the teacher, namely, "instruction" or "non-private study". Therefore, this factor militated in favour of finding an unfair dealing.

The majority held that "research" and "private study" are consistent with instructional purposes as long as the teachers (the copiers) did not disguise their distinct purposes or conflate it with the research or study purposes of the ultimate user. The teachers had no ulterior motive in providing photocopies to their students. Moreover, instruction cannot be completely segregated from "research" and "private study" because most students require the guidance of teachers to find the materials necessary for their research and private study. "The teacher/copier therefore shares a symbiotic purpose with the student/user who is engaging in research or private study. Instruction and research/private study are, in the school context, tautological". Moreover, the word "private" in "private study" does not mean that users have to study copyrighted works in isolation. "Studying and learning are essentially personal endeavours, whether they are engaged in with others or in solitude".

=== Amount of the dealing ===
The majority held that the Board misapplied this factor when it conducted a quantitative assessment based on aggregate use. A correct examination would look at the proportion between the excerpted work that was photocopied and the entire work. Furthermore, the fact that multiple copies of the same excerpts were made should be considered under the factor "character of the dealing".

=== Alternatives to the dealing ===
The Board found that schools had reasonable alternatives to photocopying textbooks. For example, they could buy original texts for each student or the school library. However, in the majority's view, buying books for each student was not a realistic alternative because the teachers were copying only short excerpts. Furthermore, the schools had already purchased originals that were kept in the class or library, from which the teachers made copies. If the Board's approach was followed, "schools would be required to buy sufficient copies for every student of every text, magazine and newspaper in Access Copyright's repertoire that is relied on by a teacher." The majority concluded that photocopying short excerpts is reasonably necessary to achieve the purpose of "research" and "private study" for the ultimate users, the students.

=== Effect of the dealing on the work ===
This factor assesses whether the dealing adversely affects or competes with the original work. Access Copyright pointed out that textbook sales had shrunk over 30 percent in 20 years. However, Access Copyright did not bring forth any evidence that this decrease was caused by the photocopies made by the teachers. Furthermore, considering the photocopies were only of short excerpts, the majority found it difficult to see how this activity would compete with the textbook market.

== Analysis by the dissent ==
The dissenting judges held that the Board made no reviewable error and that deference should be given to the Board's application of the factors to the facts.

=== Purpose of the dealing ===
Although the copied excerpts may assist students in their research and private studies, the predominant purpose for copying was to utilize the photocopied excerpts in the process of instructing and educating. Rothstein J, writing for the dissent, said that this was not an unreasonable conclusion.

=== Meaning of "private study" ===
"Private study" means individual study, "study by oneself". For example, if a copy was made of materials that were tailored to the learning needs or interests of a single or small number of students, this would be considered "private study". Given that photocopied excerpts were distributed to all the students of a class the Board's conclusion that the predominant purpose of photocopying was for instruction or 'non-private' study" is reasonable on the facts of this case.

=== Amount of dealing and character of dealing ===
The Board's analysis under the "amount of the dealing" factor remained focused on the proportion of the photocopied excerpt to the entire work. Contrary to what the majority held, the Board did not improperly consider the overall number of copies made. While teachers usually made photocopies of short excerpts, they would return to copy other excerpts from the same books "thereby making the overall proportion of the copied pages unfair in relation to the entire work over a period of time".

Under the "character of the dealing" factor, the Board correctly focused its analysis on the fact that multiple copies of the same excerpt were made at one time for dissemination to the whole class. The Board considered different aspects of the dealing under the factors, "character of the dealing" and the "amount of the dealing" and were thus not "double counting" as the majority held.

The teachers were making multiple copies of various excerpts from the same book. Thus, buying more books to distribute to students or to place in the library is not an unreasonable or unrealistic. "Where numerous short excerpts of the work are taken, the fact that there are no non-copyrighted alternatives to the dealing does not automatically render the dealing fair." The dissent was not persuaded that the Board's analysis under the "alternatives to the dealing" factor was unreasonable.

=== Effect of the dealing on the work ===
The dissent agreed with the majority that the Board erred when it concluded, without supporting evidence by Counsel, that the photocopies competed with the original, thus making the dealing unfair. However, the dissent said that it was unreasonable to render the Board's overall assessment unreasonable when it made one error under this factor. As said in CCH, not one factor is determinative. The Board's overall assessment was not unreasonable when viewed in light of the standard of reasonableness.

== See also ==
- Copyright Modernization Act, passed 29 June 2012, which added education as a purpose for fair dealing
- List of Supreme Court of Canada cases (McLachlin Court)
