= Substantial part (Canadian copyright law) =

It is an infringement in Canadian copyright law for any person to do, without the consent of the owner of the copyright, anything that only the copyright owner has a right to do as covered in the Copyright Act.

== Introduction ==
The copyright owner's rights are listed in Section 3(1) of the Copyright Act.

3. (1) For the purposes of this Act, “copyright”, in relation to a work, means the sole right to produce or reproduce the work or any substantial part thereof in any material form whatever, to perform the work or any substantial part thereof in public or, if the work is unpublished, to publish the work or any substantial part thereof, and includes the sole right

(a) to produce, reproduce, perform or publish any translation of the work,
(b) in the case of a dramatic work, to convert it into a novel or other non-dramatic work,
(c) in the case of a novel or other non-dramatic work, or of an artistic work, to convert it into a dramatic work, by way of performance in public or otherwise,
(d) in the case of a literary, dramatic or musical work, to make any sound recording, cinematograph film or other contrivance by means of which the work may be mechanically reproduced or performed,
(e) in the case of any literary, dramatic, musical or artistic work, to reproduce, adapt and publicly present the work as a cinematographic work,
(f) in the case of any literary, dramatic, musical or artistic work, to communicate the work to the public by telecommunication,
(g) to present at a public exhibition, for a purpose other than sale or hire, an artistic work created after June 7, 1988, other than a map, chart or plan,
(h) in the case of a computer program that can be reproduced in the ordinary course of its use, other than by a reproduction during its execution in conjunction with a machine, device or computer, to rent out the computer program, and
(i) in the case of a musical work, to rent out a sound recording in which the work is embodied,

and to authorize any such acts.

In order to assess whether this section of the Act has been infringed, the following three questions must be addressed:

1. What is copying?
2. What constitutes a substantial part?
3. How can copying be proven?

== What is copying? ==
Théberge v. Galerie d’Art du Petit Champlain Inc. [2002] 2 S.C.R. No. 336

A copyright holder's economic rights will be infringed where an unauthorized copy is made of a work or a substantial part thereof. The majority in Theberge, aiming to strike a balance between the rights of copyright holders and parties with legally acquired proprietary interests, found multiplication to be of necessary condition of infringement and held that no actionable reproduction had taken place in this case. However, applying a broader reading of this decision, it may be that multiplication is a necessary condition but not necessarily a sufficient condition. It is unclear whether an infringement would have been found if a second copy of the poster had been made. Metaphorical reproduction or translation (ex. from book to film) may constitute reproduction, but in this case, a paper-to-canvas translation does not. The image contained on the original poster was physically removed from one substrate, transferred, and finally affixed to another substrate, leaving the original paper blank. The process began and ended with only one copy of the poster.

Society of Composers, Authors and Music Publishers of Canada v. Canadian Assn. of Internet Providers, [2004] S.C.J. No. 44

The issue in this case was the creation of temporary cache copies of website data by internet service providers (ISPs) as a means of speeding up the process that takes place when users access a website. While in this case, copies were made, the court found that these copies did not constitute an infringement or attract liability. Under s.2.4(1)(b) of the Act, it reads as follows:

"(A) person whose only act in respect of the communication of a work or other subject matter to the public consists of providing the means of telecommunication necessary for another person to so communicate the work or other subject matter does not communicate that work or other subject matter to the public."

While this does not cover situations in which ISPs do more than merely communicate—i.e., where they make copies—the court holds that allowing such action to attract liability would produce an absurd result. The court cites the content neutrality of the caches and the demand for such technology as reasons for allowing such copies to be made without liability.

Satellite Radio (Statement of Royalties to be Collected by SOCAN, NRCC and CSI in Respect of Multi-Channel Subscription Satellite Radio Services, Copyright Board of Canada, [2009])

In this case, the Copyright Board held that while temporary buffer copies do qualify as copies, the duration and form of the copies was such that they did not constitute a substantial part of the works in question and therefore did not attract liability. In reaching this conclusion, the court adopted the proposition set out in Canadian Admiral which held that for a work to be protected by the Act, it must be expressed in some material form capable of identification and having a more or less permanent endurance.

Ultimately, the Board found that while ephemeral copies satisfy the “material form” requirement, the buffer copies were totally unrecognizable as audio files and therefore did not meet the requirement that they be capable of identification. The Board's decision on the material form element left several questions unanswered. The Board seems to suggest that the duration requirement set out in Canadian Admiral no longer applies as ephemeral copies do not, by their nature, have a more or less permanent endurance. Further, the Board does not require that copies be capable of being seen or retrieved, a requirement that would seem to follow the definition of EROS-Equipe, where the Federal Court had defined material form based on its ordinary meaning, namely palpable, tangible and perceptible –a definition adopted by the Board.

== What is a substantial part? ==
The Copyright Act does not require that an entire work be copied in order to find that a copyright holder's rights have been infringed. Copying a substantial part of the work will be sufficiently actionable. In determining whether a substantial part of a work has been copied, the court must exclude from consideration any part of the work not properly the subject matter of copyright under s.3 of the Act. The analysis is largely fact-driven, and the courts will consider both qualitative and quantitative matters. Some of the matters that have been considered include:

(a) how central was the element taken to the first work?

(b) do the selected parts constitute an essential characteristic of the work?

(c) would people who see the copy recognize the source?

(d) was the part taken used in a manner that would create a substitute to the first work and thereby jeopardize its economic exploitation? [economic damages can be considered]

Hawkes & Sons (London) Limited v. Paramount Film Service, Limited [1934] 1 Ch. 593 (C.A.)

In this case, a 20-second segment of a 4-minute song, played in background of a news clip, was found to be substantial. One of the reasons for this finding was the recognizable nature of the song –there was no doubt that anyone who knew the song would be able to identify it in the clip. The court held that the producer of the newsreel should have obtained the permission of the copyright holder. The court struggled with the issue of whether requiring a news agency to acquire permission would hamper the production of news but ultimately found that the plaintiffs had copyright and should have been asked and/or compensated for the use of their work. This case gave raise to a legislative response seen in s.30(7) which permits the incidental and not deliberate inclusion of a work in another work.

License Application by Pointe-à-Callière, Montreal Museum of Archeology and History for the Reproduction of Quotations, Copyright Board of Canada [2005] 33 C.P.R. (4th) 426

In this case, a museum requested a license to reproduce quotes whose authors could not be located. The Board denied the museum licenses on the basis that the quotes were not substantial parts of the greater work. Substantiality is to be determined qualitatively and quantitatively based on how much was copied, what specifically was reproduced and how central or essential the material was to the character first work. Further considerations include whether the public would be able to recognize the source of the copy and whether the copy would create a substitute to the first work, thereby jeopardizing its economic viability.

License Application by Breakthrough Films & Television, Copyright Board of Canada [2005] File 2004-UP/TO-33

In this case, the Copyright Board found that quotes reproduced in a History Channel documentary were substantial. The quotes themselves were relatively short and extracted from a book that was several hundred pages long, thus quantitatively unsubstantial. However, a qualitative analysis of the quotes led the Board to conclude that by using the quotes, the film would appropriate the author's knowledge, time and talent, elements that reflected an exercise of the author's skill and judgment. The sections of the book in question were original expressions of the facts and events and involved both creativity and literary merit. While this clearly establishes the work's originality, there is some uncertainty as to whether it also establishes whether the quotes “substantial” nature in relation to the rest of this book.

== Proof ==
Where there is direct evidence or an admission, there will be no question about copying but without these giveaways, it can be very difficult to prove copying. If courts look at two works and find that there is substantial similarity between them and there is proof the alleged copier had access to the ‘original’ work, copying will be presumed. This presumption is rebuttable.
