= Hubbard v Vosper =

English copyright case by Scientology

- Court: Court of Appeal of England and Wales
- Full case name: Hubbard and another v Vosper and another
- Decided: 17-19 November 1971
- Citation: [1972] 2 Q.B. 84

Court membership
- Judges sitting: Lord Denning; Lord Megaw; Lord Stephenson

Keywords
- Copyright; Fair dealing

Hubbard v Vosper, [1972] 2 Q.B. 84, is a leading English copyright law case on the defence of fair dealing. The Church of Scientology sued a former member, Cyril Vosper, for copyright infringement due to the publication of a book, The Mind Benders, criticizing Scientology. The Church of Scientology alleged that the books contained material copied from books and documents written by L. Ron Hubbard, as well as containing confidential information pertaining to Scientology courses. Vosper successfully defended the claim under the fair dealing doctrine, with the Court of Appeal deciding unanimously in his favour. The judgment given by Lord Denning clarified the scope and content of the fair dealing defence.

== Background ==
On 9 September 1971 The Mind Benders, a book critical of Scientology written by Cyril Vosper, a former scientologist of 14 years, was published by Neville Spearman. The Church of Scientology obtained an interim injunction on the same day to restrain publication of the book.

The book contained many extracts from the works of L. Ron Hubbard, including books such as Axioms and Logics and Introduction to Scientology Ethics. These extracts were often accompanied by criticism and explanations in Vosper's book. Also included in the book was information obtained by Vosper through Scientology courses, which the Church of Scientology claimed was confidential by virtue of a declaration signed by Vosper not to divulge any of the information to outsiders - specifically to those who were not "Clear".

At issue was whether the extracts in The Mind Benders constituted copyright infringement, and whether the information published in the book amounted to an actionable breach of confidence.

The lower court granted the injunction to prevent publication of the book, finding that there was a strong case for infringement.

== Reasons of the court ==
A panel of three judges in the Court of Appeal unanimously allowed the appeal, and lifted the injunction against publication of the book.

=== Fair dealing defence ===
Lord Denning, writing the leading judgment for the court, found that the defence of fair dealing applied to Vosper's book under section 6(2) of the Copyright Act 1956, which said:

No fair dealing with a literary, dramatic or musical work shall constitute an infringement of the copyright in the work if it is for purposes of criticism or review, whether of that work or of another work, and is accompanied by a sufficient acknowledgment.

In clarifying the doctrine of fair dealing, Lord Denning considered previous case law, and described a legal test for determining what would constitute a valid use of the defence:

It is impossible to define what is "fair dealing." It must be a question of degree. You must consider first the number and extent of the quotations and extracts. Are they altogether too many and too long to be fair? Then you must consider the use made of them. If they are used as a basis for comment, criticism or review, that may be fair dealing. If they are used to convey the same information as the author, for a rival purpose, that may be unfair. Next, you must consider the proportions. To take long extracts and attach short comments may be unfair. But, short extracts and long comments may be fair. Other considerations may come to mind also. But, after all is said and done, it must be a matter of impression. As with fair comment in the law of libel, so with fair dealing in the law of copyright. The tribunal of fact must decide. In the present case, there is material on which the tribunal of fact could find this to be fair dealing.

Upon consideration of the evidence, Lord Denning found that the book was a fair dealing of the source material, rejecting the argument that Vosper was criticizing not the works per se, but was instead criticizing the underlying subject matter. He found that criticism of the book and criticism of the subject matter were indistinguishable, and that this would not in itself cause the fair dealing defence to fail.

Lord Megaw agreed, and added in his concurring judgment that it may be possible to invoke the fair dealing defence even if a substantial part or the entirety of the original work was reproduced, noting that the proportion of the work taken must be weighed against the nature and purpose of the reproduction.

=== Breach of confidence ===
The Court of Appeal rejected the argument that confidential information was unfairly used in Vosper's book. Lord Denning noted that there was very little evidence pointing to the use of such confidential information, but that even if the information was used, there may be some circumstances such as these where the public interest may outweigh the confidentiality of the information.

== Aftermath ==
A further attempt by the Church of Scientology to appeal the case to the House of Lords was dismissed on 9 February 1972.

The hardcover edition of the book was released after the ruling, while a paperback edition, titled The Mind Benders: The Book They Tried to Ban was published in 1973, including a reference to the litigation in the appendix.

The Church of Scientology also attempted to ban the book in Canadian libraries by threatening the sue for libel. Several libraries were subsequently sued when they refused to remove the books.

== Significance ==
The case, and especially the judgment of Lord Denning, has been frequently cited as the leading interpretation of the fair dealing defence in the United Kingdom.

In Canada, Denning's test for fair dealing was substantially adopted and expanded by the Supreme Court of Canada in CCH Canadian Ltd. v. Law Society of Upper Canada. Chief Justice Beverley McLachlin separated the fair dealing test into six factors based on Denning's judgment:

1. The purpose of the dealing
2. The character of the dealing
3. The amount of the dealing
4. Alternatives to the dealing
5. The nature of the work
6. The effect of the dealing on the work

== See also ==
- Fair dealing in Canadian copyright law
- Fair use in U.S. copyright law
- Scientology and the legal system
