= Ningalenne Communistakki =

Socio-political play by KPAC

Ningalenne Communistakki (meaning: you made me a communist) is a Malayalam socio-political play by Kerala People's Arts Club (KPAC). This was the second and most popular stage play of KPAC. This drama propelled KPAC into the forefront of Kerala cultural scene and played a historical role in popularising the Communist movement in Kerala during the 1950s eventually leading to the establishment of first democratically elected communist ministry in the world in 1957 in Kerala.

== The history ==
The drama was inaugurated at Chavara, Kollam, on December 6, 1952. It portrayed the transition of an elderly man from a conservative upper-caste Hindu into a Communist. The play was a protest against the feudalism that prevailed in Kerala and it was the clarion call to rise and fight oppression and exploitation. On the 85th day of its performance in March 1953, the play was banned by the government under the Dramatic Performances Act, alleging that the play propagated "subversive ideas" and encouraged the people to "rebel against the government". Defying the ban, the troupe staged the play at Kovalam, near Thiruvananthapuram leading to arrest of all the artists and a case being registered against them. Following an intense legal battle, the ban was lifted after two months. Since its appearance, this play remained the most popular in Malayalam and has been performed more than ten thousand times and has highly influenced the course of Kerala's political history.

== The artists ==
Thoppil Bhasi, then a young Communist activist who was underground for political reasons wrote the play under the pseudonym Soman. The drama was directed jointly by G. Janardhana Kurup and N Rajagopalan Nair MLA. The songs were written by ONV Kurup and G. Devarajan composed the music and sung by KS George and K. P. A. C. Sulochana. The main actors were Kampisseri Karunakaran MLA, Adv. G. Janardhana Kurup, Adv. N Rajagopalan Nair (MLA), O. Madhavan, Thoppil Krishna Pillai (Thoppil Krishna pillai, the younger brother of Thoppil Bhasi acted in different plays of KPAC for 37 years continuously), Bhaskara Panicker, V.Sambasivan, Sreenarayana Pillai, K. P. A. C. Sulochana, Sudharma, Bhargavi and Vijayakumari. Later highly talented artists like P. J. Antony, CG Gopinath and Adv. Kumarakom Sankunni Menon played leading roles in this play.

== Patrons and prominent persons behind the staging of 'Ningalenne Communistakki' ==
M. N. Govindan Nair, Prof. MP Paul, R Sankara Narayanan Thampi, K Kesavan Potti, Adv. KS Rajamony, N Sreedharan (in Travancore-Cochin), K.P.R. Gopalan, E.M.S. Namboodiripad, AK Gopalan, KA Keraleeyan, NE Balaram, K Damodharan, MK Kelu, Azheekkodan Raghavan, Chathunni Master, A.V. Kunjambu, Justice. V.R. Krishna Iyer (in Malabar), E. Balanandan, Prithviraj Kapoor, Khwaja Ahmad Abbas, Balraj Sahni (in Bombay).

== Comments and Criticisms ==
E.M.S. Namboodiripad, in his essays "From 'Pattabacki' to 'Ningalenne Communistakki'" (1954) and "Malayalam Theatre: 'Ningalenne Communistakki' and After" (1973), wrote that one of the major flaws of "Ningalenne Communistakki" was that the Communist characters in the play failed to impress and did not correspond to real Communists. He commented that "They are puppets with no relationship to living Communist activists."

== Trivia ==
The drama was made as a Malayalam movie in 1970 with the same name with Prem Nazir and Sheela doing the lead roles.

Thoppil Bhasi's son Mr. Soman formed the Thoppil Bhasi Theatres to stage a sequel of this play titled Enum Ente Thampranum (Me and My Lord), the staging date is not announced yet.

== See also ==
- Civic Chandran v. Ammini Amma
- Punnapra Vayalar (1968)
- Thulabharam (1968)
- Mooladhanam
- Anubhavangal Paalichakal (1971)
- Neelakannukal
- Kodumudikal (1981)
- Raktha Sakshi (1982)
- Mukhamukham (1984)
- Sakhavu (1986)
- Adimakal Udamakal (1987)
- Lal Salam (1990)
- Rakthasakshikal Sindabad (1998)
