= Théberge v Galerie d'Art du Petit Champlain Inc =

- Supreme Court of Canada

Hearing: October 11, 2001 Judgment: March 28, 2002
- Full case name: Galerie d'Art du Petit Champlain Inc., Galerie d'Art Yves Laroche Inc., Éditions Multi‑Graph Ltée, Galerie d’Art Laroche, Denis Inc. and Serge Rosa v Claude Théberge
- Citations: [2002] 2 S.C.R. 336, 2002 SCC 34
- Prior history: Appeal from the Quebec Court of Appeal, 9 C.P.R. (4th) 259
- Ruling: Appeal allowed. Order of the Quebec Court of Appeal vacated.

Holding
- A transfer of a work from one medium to another that does not create a new copy does not infringe copyright

Court membership
- Chief Justice: Beverley McLachlin; Puisne Justices: Claire L'Heureux-Dubé, Charles Gonthier, Frank Iacobucci, John C. Major, Michel Bastarache, Ian Binnie, Louise Arbour, Louis LeBel

Reasons given
- Majority: Binnie J., joined by McLachlin C.J. Iacobucci and Major JJ.
- Dissent: Gonthier J., joined by L'Heureux-Dubé and LeBel JJ.
- Bastarache and Arbour JJ. took no part in the consideration or decision of the case.

Théberge v Galerie d'Art du Petit Champlain Inc [2002] 2 S.C.R. 336, 2002 SCC 34 is one of the Supreme Court of Canada's leading cases on copyright law. This case interprets the meaning of "reproduction" within the Copyright Act of Canada, and touches on the moral rights to copyrighted material and how much control an author has over his work once it is in the hands of a third party.

== Background ==
The respondent, Claude Théberge, a painter with a well-established international reputation, assigned by way of contract the right to publish reproductions, cards and other stationery products representing certain of his works to a publisher. The appellant art gallery, Galerie d'Art du Petit Champlain, purchased cards, photo-lithographs and posters embodying various of the artist's works from the publisher, and then transferred the images to canvas. Galerie d'Art du Petit Champlain bought the rights to make a limited number of paper copies of Théberge's paintings in order to create posters from them. The process used involved lifting the ink that was used in printing a paper poster and transferring it entirely onto a canvas, leaving the poster blank and keeping the number of reproductions constant. Théberge applied for an injunction, an accounting of profits, and damages against the appellants at the Quebec Superior Court. The case was appealed to the Court of Appeal for Quebec and ultimately to the Supreme Court of Canada.

== Opinion of the Court ==
The issues before the Supreme Court were whether transferring the work from paper to canvas violated the Copyright Act by creating an unauthorized reproduction, and to what extent does an artist have control over the reproduction of their work. The resolution of these issues would determine the pre-judgment authority the author has to seize the works.

Binnie J, with McLachlin CJ, Iacobucci, and Major JJ concurring, held that there was no reproduction involved because no new copies were made. There was only the transfer of ink, which was considered modification, not a copy. The respondent is responsible to find authority for the seizure in the Code of Civil Procedure read in the light of the Copyright Act. If he can not do so then the seizure was wrongful and all loss of the appellant's sales and reputation should be fixed. The Court found the artist's legitimate economic interests were not changed by the transferring of the ink from paper to canvas. It also found that if they considered the creation of the canvas as a "reproduction" despite the lack of multiplication, they would be reading in the American right of derivative works, a concept without statutory basis in Canadian copyright law.

The Court criticized the plaintiff for trying to make a moral argument where the issue is one of economics when there is a claim of copyright infringement as opposed to moral right infringement. In a claim of moral rights the plaintiff could have sued on the modification of the art, but no argument was made by the party. The Court also ruled that pre-judgment seizure is not available to an artist who claims a violation of his moral rights.

In the end the court felt that it should not put too much power in the hands of the artist over the purchaser of the art, as it would overly limit the ability of private property owners to do what they will with their possessions.

=== Nature and purpose of copyright ===
Copyright in this country is creature of statute and the rights and remedies it provides are exhaustive:

This is not to say that Canadian copyright law lives in splendid isolation from the rest of the world. Canada has adhered to the Berne Convention for the Protection of Literary and Artistic Works (1886) and subsequent revisions and additions, and other international treaties on the subject including the Universal Copyright Convention (1952), Can. T.S. 1962 No. 12.

In reaching his conclusion, Binnie J. made several statements regarding the purpose and nature of Copyright law in which he characterized it as a balance between interests.

The Copyright Act is usually presented as a balance between promoting the public interest in the encouragement and dissemination of works of the arts and intellect and obtaining a just reward for the creator (or, more accurately, to prevent someone other than the creator from appropriating whatever benefits may be generated).

He characterizes the use of Copyright as a limited economic right:

The proper balance among these and other public policy objectives lies not only in recognizing the creator's rights but in giving due weight to their limited nature. In crassly economic terms it would be as inefficient to overcompensate artists and authors for the right of reproduction as it would be self-defeating to undercompensate them. Once an authorized copy of a work is sold to a member of the public, it is generally for the purchaser, not the author, to determine what happens to it.

Significantly, as well, he acknowledges the need for a public domain:

Excessive control by holders of copyrights and other forms of intellectual property may unduly limit the ability of the public domain to incorporate and embellish creative innovation in the long-term interests of society as a whole, or create practical obstacles to proper utilization. This is reflected in the exceptions to copyright infringement enumerated in ss. 29 to 32.2, which seek to protect the public domain in traditional ways such as fair dealing for the purpose of criticism or review and to add new protections to reflect new technology, such as limited computer program reproduction and "ephemeral recordings" in connection with live performances.

== Dissent ==
L'Heureux-Dubé, Gonthier and LeBel JJ dissented. They interpreted the purpose of the Copyright Act as a means of protecting the rights of artists, which would require a broader interpretation of "reproduction". In their definition, "reproduction" did not necessarily encompass making additional copies. Instead, a new "fixation" (a new physical structure or "production" of the work, such as the "re-fixation" of the ink onto canvas) constituted a "reproduction".

== See also ==
- List of Supreme Court of Canada cases (McLachlin Court)
