= Anu Bradford =

Finnish-American legal scholar

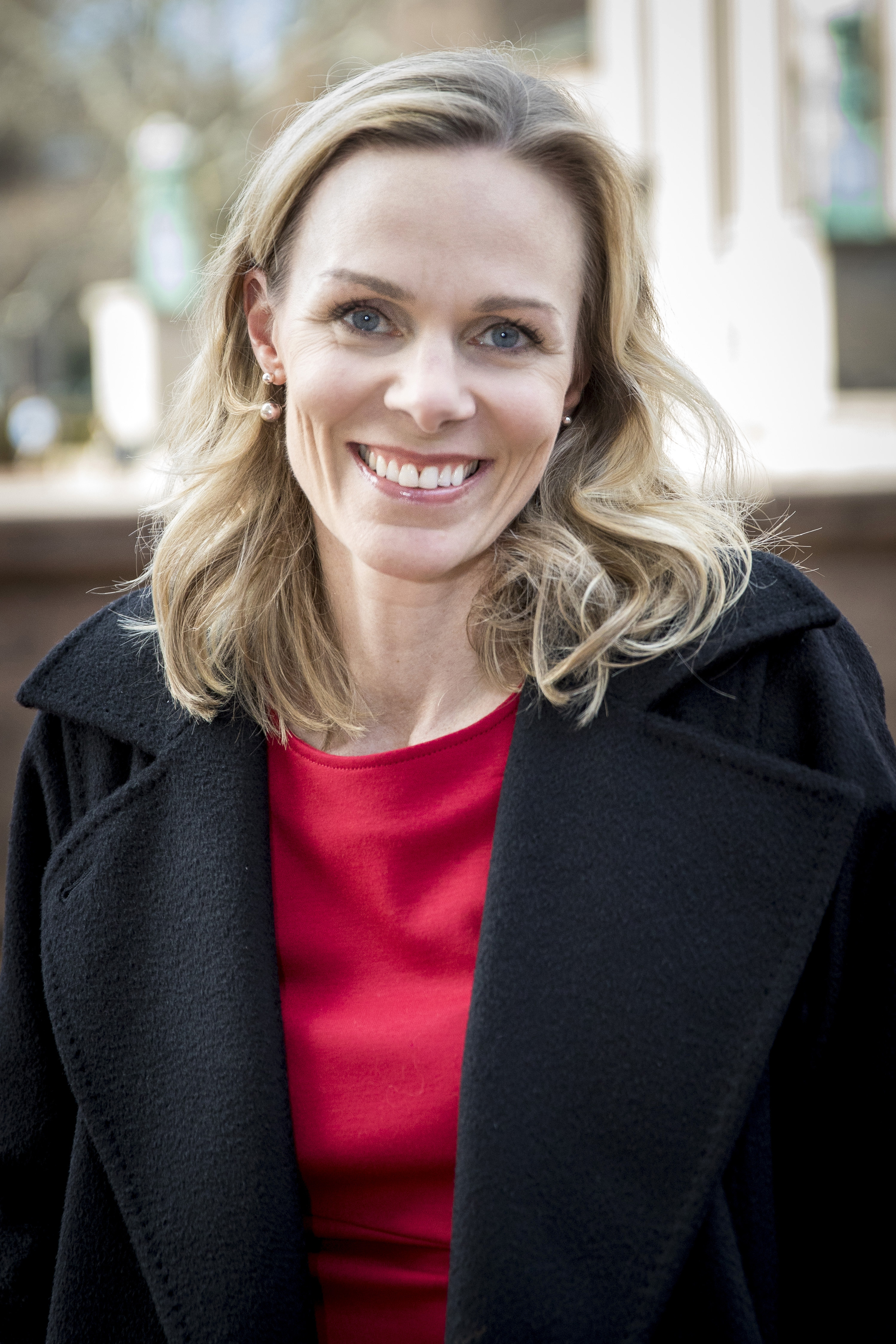
- Bradford in 2018
- Born: Anu Piilola; 1975 (age 50–51); Tampere, Finland
- Spouse: Travis Bradford
- Awards: Stein Rokkan Prize for Comparative Social Science Research (2024)

Academic background
- Education: University of Helsinki (Lic., LLM); Harvard University (LLM, SJD)

Anu H. Bradford (née Anu Piilola, born 1975) is a Finnish-American author, law professor, and expert in international trade law. In 2014, she was named the Henry L. Moses Distinguished Professor of Law and International Organization at the Columbia Law School. She is the author of The Brussels Effect: How the European Union Rules the World. In 2024, she was awarded the Stein Rokkan Prize for Comparative Social Science Research for her book Digital Empires: The Global Battle to Regulate Technology.

== Early life and education ==
Bradford was born and raised in Tampere, Finland. In her native homeland, she earned her L.L.M degree from the University of Helsinki in 2000. She attended Harvard Law School on a Fulbright Scholarship, graduating with another Master of Laws degree from Harvard in 2002. After time in Brussels with the law firm of Cleary Gottlieb Steen & Hamilton, working on EU competition law, she returned to Harvard and graduated with an S.J.D. degree in 2007.

== Career ==
In 2008, Bradford joined the faculty at the University of Chicago as an assistant professor of law. By 2010, she had been named a Young Global Leader by the World Economic Forum. Two years later, Bradford coined the term Brussels effect, which she named after the similar California effect that can be observed within the United States. The Brussels effect refers to the European Union's unilateral ability to regulate global markets. That same year, she joined Columbia Law School as a professor of law and an expert in international trade law.

At Columbia, Bradford holds the Henry L. Moses Professor of Law and International Organization chair. She is also a director for the European Legal Studies Center and senior scholar at Jerome A. Chazen Institute for Global Business at Columbia Business School. Her research and teaching focus on European Union law, international trade law, and comparative and international antitrust law.

Since joining Columbia Law, Bradford co-led a study of Global Competition Laws and Policy with Adam Chilton, building the largest dataset of the world's competition laws, also known as Antitrust laws, that allows researchers, lawyers, journalists, and policymakers to study antitrust policy and regulation of the global economy.

== The Brussels Effect ==
In February 2020, Oxford University Press published Bradford's first book, The Brussels Effect: How the European Union Rules the World. Essays adapted from the book have appeared in Foreign Affairs and The Wall Street Journal. Reviewing the book for the Financial Times, Alan Beattie wrote, "What is incontrovertible is that the Brussels effect has dominated global economic regulation to an under-appreciated extent. This book will be the definitive reference guide for those wishing to understand". In The Economist, the Charlemagne column, "The parable of the plug", published in the 6 Feb 2020 edition focused on Bradford's new book. Andrew Moravcsik wrote in Foreign Affairs that The Brussels Effect "may well be the single most important book on Europe's global influence to appear in a decade".

== Other activities ==
- European Council on Foreign Relations (ECFR), Member

== Personal life ==
Bradford and her husband Travis Bradford have three children.
