= Anti-Counterfeiting Trade Agreement =

Treaty on intellectual property

ACTA
Anti-Counterfeiting Trade Agreement French: Accord commercial anti-contrefaçon Spanish: Acuerdo Comercial Anti-Falsificación
- Type: Plurilateral agreement
- Drafted: 15 November 2010 (final revision); 15 April 2011 (formal publication)
- Signed: 1 October 2011
- Location: Tokyo, Japan
- Effective: Not in force
- Condition: Ratification by six states
- Negotiators: Australia; Canada; European Union; Japan; Mexico; Morocco; New Zealand; Singapore; South Korea; Switzerland; United States
- Signatories: Australia; Canada; European Union (+22 members); Japan; Mexico; Morocco; New Zealand; Singapore; South Korea; United States
- Parties: 1 (Japan)
- Ratifiers: Japan
- Depositary: Government of Japan
- Languages: English, French and Spanish

Full text
- Anti-Counterfeiting Trade Agreement at Wikisource

The Anti-Counterfeiting Trade Agreement (ACTA) is a multilateral treaty for the purpose of establishing international standards for intellectual property rights enforcement that did not enter into force. The agreement aims to establish an international legal framework for targeting counterfeit goods, generic medicines and copyright infringement on the Internet, and would create a new governing body outside existing forums, such as the World Trade Organization, the World Intellectual Property Organization, and the United Nations.

The agreement was signed in October 2011 by Australia, Canada, Japan, Morocco, New Zealand, Singapore, South Korea, and the United States. In 2012, Mexico, the European Union and 22 countries that are member states of the European Union signed as well. Only one signatory (Japan) has ratified (formally approved) the agreement, which would come into force in countries that ratified it after ratification by six countries.

Industrial groups with interests in copyright, trademarks and other types of intellectual property said that ACTA was a response to "the increase in global trade of counterfeit goods and pirated copyright protected works". Organizations such as the Motion Picture Association of America and International Trademark Association are understood to have had a significant influence over the ACTA agenda.

Organisations representing citizens and non-governmental interests argued that ACTA could infringe fundamental rights including freedom of expression and privacy. ACTA has also been criticised by Doctors Without Borders for endangering access to medicines in developing countries. The nature of negotiations was criticized as secretive and has excluded non-governmental organizations, developing countries and the general public from the agreement's negotiation process and it has been described as policy laundering by critics including the Electronic Frontier Foundation and the Entertainment Consumers Association.

The signature of the EU and many of its member states resulted in widespread protests across Europe. European Parliament rapporteur Kader Arif resigned. His replacement, British MEP David Martin, recommended that the Parliament should reject ACTA, stating: "The intended benefits of this international agreement are far outweighed by the potential threats to civil liberties". On 4 July 2012, the European Parliament declined its consent, effectively rejecting it, 478 votes to 39, with 165 abstentions. After this rejection, no further action was taken to ratify the treaty.

== Negotiations ==
Negotiations for the ACTA treaty are not part of any international body. ACTA was first developed by Japan and the United States in 2006. Canada, the European Union (represented in the negotiations by the European Commission, the EU Presidency and EU Member States) and Switzerland joined the preliminary talks throughout 2006 and 2007. Official negotiations began in June 2008, with Australia, Mexico, Morocco, New Zealand, the Republic of Korea and Singapore joining the talks. The Senate of Mexico voted unanimously to withdraw Mexico from ACTA negotiations on 30 September 2010.

Round	Location	Date	Participants and discussion topics	Refs
1	Geneva	3–4 June 2008	Participants: Australia, the European Union, Jordan, Mexico, Morocco, New Zealand, Republic of Korea, Singapore and United Arab Emirates	
2	Washington, D.C.	29–31 July 2008		
3	Tokyo	8–9 October 2008		
4	Paris	15–18 December 2008		
5	Rabat	16–17 July 2009	Participants: Australia, Canada, the European Union (represented by the European Commission, the EU Presidency (Sweden) and EU Member States), Japan, the Republic of Korea, Mexico, Morocco, New Zealand, Singapore, Switzerland and the USA; Topics: international cooperation, enforcement practices and institutional issues.	
6	Seoul	4–6 November 2009	Topics: enforcement in the digital environment and criminal enforcement.	
7	Guadalajara	26–29 January 2010		
8	Wellington	12–16 April 2010	Topics: border measures, enforcement procedures in the digital environment, criminal enforcement, civil enforcement, and transparency.	
9	Lucerne	28 June – 1 July 2010		

=== Leaks, publications and consultations ===
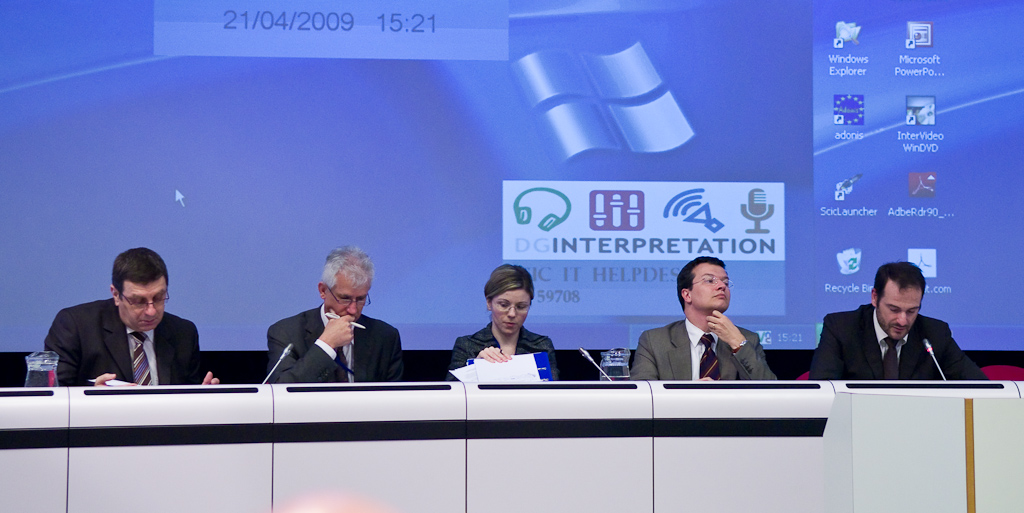
Stakeholders' consultation meeting on 21 April 2009 at the Charlemagne building in Brussels

According to a 2008 European Union commentary there was at that stage no draft, but a leaked document constituted initial views as they had been circulated by some of the negotiating parties. Leaked details published in February 2009 showed the 6 chapter-division also present in the final text. Most discussion was focused on the "Enforcement of Intellectual Property Rights" (IPR) chapter 2, which had the four sections also present (but slightly differently named) in the final version: Civil Enforcement, Border Measures, Criminal Enforcement and Intellectual Property Rights Enforcement in the Digital Environment. Apart from the participating governments, an advisory committee of large US-based multinational corporations was consulted on the content of the draft treaty, including the Pharmaceutical Research and Manufacturers of America and the International Intellectual Property Alliance (which includes the Business Software Alliance, Motion Picture Association of America, and Recording Industry Association of America). A 2009 Freedom of Information request showed that the following companies also received copies of the draft under a nondisclosure agreement: Google, eBay, Intel, Dell, News Corporation, Sony Pictures, Time Warner, and Verizon.

On 23 March 2010, the entire "18 January 2010 consolidated text" of sections 2.1 and 2.4 (Civil Enforcement, and Special Measures Related To Technological Enforcement Means and the Internet) along with the demands of each negotiator was leaked to the public.

The negotiating parties published the then-current draft on 20 April 2010. In June 2010, a conference with "over 90 academics, practitioners and public interest organizations from six continents" concluded "that the terms of the publicly released draft of ACTA threaten numerous public interests, including every concern specifically disclaimed by negotiators." A group of over 75 law professors signed a letter to President Obama demanding that ACTA be halted and changed. A full consolidated text of the proposed ACTA, dated 1 July 2010, apparently coming from the civil liberties committee (LIBE) of the European Parliament was leaked providing the full text from the Luzern round of negotiations, including the name of the negotiating parties along with their positions.

The revised and final text, dated 15 November 2010, was leaked on 16 November 2010 by several websites.

On 16 April 2010, the negotiating countries issued a joint statement that they had reached unanimous agreement to make the consolidated text, as established at that round of negotiation, available to the public by 21 April. It was also decided to not release individual negotiating positions of countries. The final draft text was published on 20 April 2010. The final text was released on 15 November 2010, and published on 15 April 2011 in English, French and Spanish.

=== Negotiation mandates and positions ===
==== European Union ====
A draft Report from 26 August 2008 by the European Commission tried to establish a mandate from the European Parliament for the negotiation of ACTA. On 25 September 2008 the Council of the European Union adopted a resolution in support of ACTA. In November 2008 the European Commission described ACTA as an attempt to enforce intellectual property rights and states that countries involved in the negotiations see intellectual property rights as "a key instrument for their development and innovation policies". It argues:

The proliferation of intellectual property rights (IPR) infringements poses an ever-increasing threat to the sustainable development of the world economy. It is a problem with serious economic and social consequences. Today, we face a number of new challenges: the increase of dangerous counterfeit goods (pharmaceuticals, food and drink, cosmetics or toys, car parts); the speed and ease of digital reproduction; the growing importance of the Internet as a means of distribution; and the sophistication and resources of international counterfeiters. All these factors have made the problem more pervasive and harder to tackle.

In March 2010, a leaked draft negotiation text showed that the European Commission had proposed language in ACTA to require criminal penalties for "inciting, aiding and abetting" certain offenses, including "at least in cases of willful trademark counterfeiting and copyright or related rights piracy on a commercial scale." In a report published on 11 March 2009, the European Parliament called on the European Commission to "immediately make all documents related to the ongoing international negotiations on the Anti-Counterfeiting Trade Agreement (ACTA) publicly available".

The European Parliament resolution of 10 March 2010 on the transparency and state of play of the ACTA negotiations stated that "according to documents leaked, the ACTA negotiations touch on, among other things, pending EU legislation regarding the enforcement of IPRs (COD/2005/0127 – Criminal measures aimed at assuring the enforcement of intellectual property rights (IPRED-II)) and the so-called "Telecoms Package" and on existing EU legislation regarding e-commerce and data protection." The resolution furthermore states, "whereas the ongoing EU efforts to harmonise IPR enforcement measures should not be circumvented by trade negotiations that are outside the scope of normal EU decision-making processes." Also, that the enforcement of intellectual property rights (IPRs), including patent, trademark, and copyright law, must be "accomplished in a manner that does not impede innovation or competition, undermine IPR limitations and personal data protection, restrict the free flow of information or unduly burden legitimate trade."

The resolution called for the European Commission and the European Council to "grant public and parliamentary access to ACTA negotiation texts and summaries, in accordance with" the Lisbon Treaty and "Regulation 1049/2001 of 30 May 2001 regarding public access to European Parliament, Council and Commission documents." In the resolution, the European Parliament "deplores the calculated choice of the parties not to negotiate through well-established international bodies, such as WIPO and WTO, which have established frameworks for public information and consultation". The European Parliament asserted that under the Treaty of Lisbon the European Commission needed to provide "immediate and full information" to the European Parliament on international treaties, such as ACTA. The resolution also "stresses that, unless Parliament is immediately and fully informed at all stages of the negotiations, it reserves its right to take suitable action, including bringing a case before the Court of Justice in order to safeguard its prerogatives".

== Signatures and ratifications ==
As of 26 December 2014, the treaty was signed -but not all ratified- by 31 states as well as the European Union. Japan was on 4 October 2012 the first to ratify the treaty.

The treaty is according to Article 39 open for signature until 1 May 2013 for the participants involved in the negotiations as well as all members of the World Trade Organization (WTO) of which the participants agree. It enters into force after subsequent ratification by six states (Article 40). After 1 May 2013, WTO members that did not sign, may accede to the convention after approval by the ACTA committee (Article 43).

A signing ceremony was held on 1 October 2011 in Tokyo, with the United States, Australia, Canada, Japan, Morocco, New Zealand, Singapore, and South Korea signing the treaty. The European Union, Mexico, and Switzerland attended but did not sign, professing support and saying they will do so in the future (the European Union and 22 of its member states did so in January 2012). In May 2012, the Swiss government announced that it would withhold its signature while deliberations in the EU are pending. In early July 2012, Claude Heller, Mexican Ambassador to Japan, signed the treaty. On 23 July, the Senate of Mexico rejected the decision the Cabinet of the country took.

=== European Union ===
The European Union and its then 28 Member States share competency on the subject of this convention. This means that entry into force on its territory requires ratification (or accession) by all states, as well as approval of the European Union. Approval of the European Union involves consent of the European Parliament as well as the Council. On 26 January 2012, the European Union and 22 Member States signed the treaty in Tokyo. According to depositary Japan, the remaining members (Cyprus, Estonia, Germany, Netherlands and Slovakia) were expected to sign it on the completion of their respective domestic procedures. On 3 February 2012, Poland announced it halted the ratification process as it "had made insufficient consultations before signing the agreement in late January, and it was necessary to ensure it was entirely safe for Polish citizens." Also, Bulgaria, the Czech Republic, Latvia, Lithuania and non-signatories Germany, Slovakia and Slovenia have indicated that they have stopped the process of becoming a party to the treaty. On 17 February 2012, the Polish prime minister, Donald Tusk, announced that Poland will not ratify ACTA. On 21 February 2012, a news report noted that "many countries in Europe that have signed the treaty have set aside ratification in response to public outcry, effectively hampering the ratification and implementation of the treaty."

When Poland announced its intentions to sign the treaty on 18 January 2012, a number of Polish government websites, including those of the President and Polish Parliament, were shut down by denial of service attacks that started 21 January, akin to protests against SOPA and PIPA that had happened two days previously. Notwithstanding the ongoing protests, the Polish ambassador to Japan signed the treaty.

On 22 February 2012, the European Commission asked the European Court of Justice to assess whether the ACTA agreement violates the EU's fundamental human rights and freedoms, thereby resulting in delay for the ratification process in the EU. However, INTA, the International Trade Committee of the European Parliament, in view of its exclusion from the negotiations, the secrecy of the negotiations, and the recent protests, moved to have its vote on the ratification take place in June or July 2012 as planned, in spite of the European Commission's objections.

On 2 May 2012, European Commissioner for Digital Agenda Neelie Kroes suggested in a speech in Berlin that ACTA would not come into force and welcomed openness in negotiations:

We have recently seen how many thousands of people are willing to protest against rules that they see as constraining the openness and innovation of the Internet. This is a strong new political voice. And as a force for openness, I welcome it, even if I do not always agree with everything it says on every subject. We are now likely to be in a world without SOPA and without ACTA. Now we need to find solutions to make the Internet a place of freedom, openness, and innovation fit for all citizens, not just for the techno avant-garde.

— European Commissioner Neelie Kroes

On 29 May 2012, the Dutch House of Representatives in two non-binding resolutions called upon the Dutch government not to sign ACTA and not to submit it to the House for ratification. In addition it requested the government not to vote in favor of similar treaties in the future.

The European Commission confirmed on 20 December 2012 that it was withdrawing Anti-Counterfeiting Trade Agreement (ACTA) referral to the Court of Justice of the European Union (EU). This ended ACTA's process at EU level and confirms rejection of the treaty by the EU.

==== European Parliament ====
On 26 January 2012, after the signing of 22 European Member States Kader Arif, the European Parliament's rapporteur for ACTA, resigned, saying "I want to send a strong signal and alert the public opinion about this unacceptable situation. I will not take part in this masquerade.". He was replaced by David Martin.

On 12 April 2012, David Martin recommended that the European Parliament should reject ACTA, saying the intended benefits were far outweighed by the risks, and "given the vagueness of certain aspects of the text and the uncertainty over its interpretation, the European Parliament cannot guarantee adequate protection for citizens' rights in the future under ACTA."

ACTA was discussed in five parliamentary committees, all of which voted to reject the ACTA treaty, as follows:

Committee	Recommendation	Against	For	Abstentions
Development committee (DEVE)	Reject	17	1	3
Civil Liberties (LIBE)	Reject	36	1	21
Industry (ITRE)	Reject	31	25	
Legal Affairs (JURI)	Reject (amended from "approve" recommendation by the rapporteur)	12	10	2
International Trade (INTA, lead committee)	Reject	19	12	

These recommendations of the top 4 committees served as advice for the International Trade Committee, the lead committee on ACTA. On 21 June 2012, this committee recommended 19–12 that the EP reject the treaty. The full European Parliament voted on the issue on 4 July 2012 and declined consent to ACTA, effectively rejecting it, with 478 against to 39 in favour, and 165 abstentions.

=== United States ===
It has been reported that the Office of the U.S. Trade Representative (USTR) has stated they will not use the fast track negotiating authority (Trade Promotion Authority) to implement ACTA, but the form of a "sole executive agreement" instead. While on 6 March 2012 Legal Adviser of the Department of State Harold Koh refused to back USTR's theory that it could enter any agreement that does not change U.S. law (but binds Congress not to change it) without Congressional consent, Koh described ACTA as a "congressional-executive agreement" that Congress approved of ex-ante, citing the PRO-IP Act. This proposed method of adoption has encountered criticism in Congress. According to Senator Ron Wyden: "There are questions of constitutional authority surrounding whether the administration can enter into this agreement without Congress's approval ... Either way, when international accords, like ACTA, are conceived and constructed under a cloak of secrecy, it is hard to argue that they represent the broad interests of the general public. The controversy over ACTA should surprise no one." Later, on 20 March 2012, Senator Wyden noted, "I believe Congress should approve binding international agreements before the U.S. is obligated to comply with those agreements. This [is] a point where the administration and I disagree and is particularly true on matters that impact our nation’s ability to implement policies that encourage innovation."

In June 2012, Ambassador Miriam Sapiro (a Deputy U.S. Trade Representative), presented the official White House position on ACTA as follows:

We believe that ACTA will help protect the intellectual property that is essential to American jobs in innovative and creative industries. At the same time, ACTA recognizes the importance of online privacy, freedom of expression and due process, and calls on signatories to protect these values in the course of complying with the Agreement.

— Miriam Sapiro, "Response to 'End ACTA and Protect our right to privacy on the Internet'; the Role of ACTA". (June 2012)

== ACTA committee ==
ACTA establishes the ACTA committee in Article 36 as its own governing body outside existing international institutions such as the World Trade Organization (WTO), the World Intellectual Property Organization (WIPO) or the United Nations. With regards to the reason for not pursuing ACTA through the G8, WTO, WIPO or other formal existing structures the European Commission explains that a free-standing agreement provides the most flexibility "to pursue this project among interested countries", while stating that "the membership and priorities of those organizations (G8, WTO, and WIPO) simply are not the most conducive to this kind of path breaking project."

== Treaty content ==
The finalized agreement text was published on 15 April 2011 and includes six chapters with 45 articles:

=== Chapter I: Initial Provisions and General Definitions ===
This Chapter describes the scope of the agreement as well as relations to other agreements. It asserts that obligations from other agreements still exist with entry into force of this agreement (Article 1) and that the agreement applies only those intellectual property rights existing in the country applying the treaty (Article 3). Countries may impose stricter measures than the treaty requires (Article 2) and should share (confidential) information for law enforcement purposes (Article 4). The treaty explicitly also applies to free zones (Article 5).

=== Chapter II: Legal Framework For Enforcement of Intellectual Property Rights ===
The legal framework set out in Chapter II is divided in five sections.

==== Section 1: General Obligations with Respect to Enforcement ====
General obligations are requirements to implement the provisions in law, to have fair procedure as well as "proportionality between the seriousness of the infringement, the interests of third parties, and the applicable measures, remedies and penalties" (Article 6).

==== Section 2: Civil Enforcement ====
The sections provides that rights holders have access to civil or (if they exist) administrative procedures (Article 7) and to have the possibility for judges "to issue an order against a party to desist from an infringement" (Article 8). They may also require in civil procedure pirated copyright goods and counterfeit trademark goods to be destroyed (Article 10). According to Article 11, they may ask (alleged) infringers to provide information on the goods it "controls". Article 9 states that a Party's judicial authorities may consider inter alia any legitimate measure of value submitted by a rights holder, including lost profits, the value of infringed property as per market price, or the suggested retail price. This clause has received considerable criticism for its validity, as well as its similarity to previously controversial attempts at establishing precedent to the same effect. According to the Foundation for a Free Information Infrastructure, the principle does not "reflect the economic loss suffered by the right holder". In a Business Line opinion piece, a professor from the Indian Institute of Foreign Trade's Centre for WTO Studies also explained that it would lead to "excess valuation" in infringement suits.

==== Section 3: Border Measures ====
At borders, officials may act on suspect goods on their own initiative or upon request of a "rights holder". For goods in transit, the requirements do not have to be enacted by a state (Article 16). "Small consignment" for commercial use are included in the border provisions, while "goods of a non-commercial nature contained in travellers’ personal luggage" are excluded from the scope (Article 14).

==== Section 4: Criminal Enforcement ====
Section 4 of ACTA deals with the criminal enforcement of IPRS according to Professor Michael Blakeney. The primary focus of the section (in Article 23) is the criminalisation of wilful trademark counterfeiting or copyright or related rights piracy on a commercial scale.

===== Article 23: Criminal Offences =====
At least "wilful trademark counterfeiting or copyright or related rights piracy on a commercial scale" should be punishable under criminal law.

According to European Digital Rights, the article "provides an extremely low threshold" when considering that the scope includes "acts" and because consequences for infringement can include criminal penalties. EDRi also outlines an absence of definitions for associated constructs, such as "aiding and abetting", "commercial scale", and "economic advantage", which it describes as "simply inappropriate in a key provision, on whose meaning the proportionality and the legality, of the Agreement rests".

===== Article 24: Penalties =====
Penalties that Parties should have in their criminal system should "include imprisonment as well as monetary fines", which are sufficiently high for discouragement of actions forbidden under the treaty.

==== Section 5: Enforcement of Intellectual Property Rights in the Digital Environment ====
===== Article 27: Enforcement in the Digital Environment =====
In the digital environment, also Civil and Criminal enforcement should be available "to permit effective action against an act of infringement of intellectual property rights that takes place in the digital environment" (Article 27, paragraph 1). Furthermore, infringement over digital networks (possibly including "the unlawful use of means of widespread distribution for infringing purposes") should be enforced in a manner, which "preserves fundamental principles such as freedom of expression, fair process, and privacy" (Paragraph 2). Against circumvention of systems to prevent copying measures should be implemented (Paragraph 6).

Critics of this article, such as the European Digital Rights, have raised concerns that its emphasis on the role of corporations in enforcement "promotes the policing and even punishment of alleged infringements outside normal judicial frameworks", while failing to "ensure effective remedies against such interferences with fundamental rights" despite "vague references to 'fair process' in the text [that] are not backed up by mandatory processes requiring respect for the Rule of Law" in Article 21 of the European Union's Maastricht Treaty.

=== Chapter III: Enforcement Practices ===
==== Article 28: Enforcement Expertise, Information, and Domestic Coordination ====
Parties are expected to cultivate expertise within agencies tasked with enforcing intellectual property rights, promote internal coordination, and facilitate joint actions. They are also compelled to collect and utilize statistical data, as well as "other relevant information concerning intellectual property rights infringements", to prevent and combat infringement as necessary. The article also indicates that parties shall "endeavour to promote, where appropriate, the establishment and maintenance of formal or informal mechanisms, such as advisory groups, whereby [their] competent authorities may receive the views of right holders and other relevant stakeholders."

==== Article 29: Management of Risk at Border ====
Parties may consult stakeholders or the intellectual property authorities of another party to identify and mitigate risks. Information, including but not limited to information that assists in identifying and targeting suspicious shipments, may be shared between parties for the purposes of border enforcement. Should an importing party seize infringing goods, it may supply such information to assist an exporting party in pursuing infringers.

=== Chapter IV: International Cooperation ===
Chapter V contains three articles:

- Article 33: International Cooperation
- Article 34: Information Sharing
- Article 35: Capacity Building and Technical Assistance

=== Chapter V: Institutional Arrangements ===
In Article 36, the ACTA committee is established as governing body of the treaty in which all parties are represented. The body is not involved in individual cases, but monitors implementation, can formally propose changes to the convention (on the suggestion of a Party) and decides on the admittance of WTO-members that were not present at the negotiations. The committee decides by consensus. Parties establish a contact point (Article 37) that acts as a primary contact with regards to the execution of the treaty and are required to "shall accord sympathetic consideration" to requests for cooperation on matters regarding the convention (Article 38).

=== Chapter VI: Final Provisions ===
Chapter VI is the treaty's last chapter. It outlines principles and procedures regarding the treaty's status and execution.

==== Article 39: Signature ====
The article specifies that the agreement remains open for signature until 1 May 2013 by its negotiators, as well as any other World Trade Organization member that the negotiators support by consensus.

==== Article 40: Entry into Force ====
Conditions necessary for the treaty to become effective are defined, which include six parties submitting instruments of ratification, acceptance, or approval to the depositary, as well as a thirty-day interim waiting period.

==== Article 41: Withdrawal ====
The process for withdrawal is outlined, which entails a party submitting written notification to the depositary and becomes effective 180 days after receipt. This process would also be subject to various national guidelines.

==== Article 42: Amendments ====
Parties may submit proposed amendments to the committee for review, which would then determine whether or not the proposed amendment should be presented for potential ratification, acceptance, or approval. Successful amendments would become effective 90 days after all parties have provided their respective instruments of ratification, acceptance, or approval to the depositary.

In a report to the Australian Joint Standing Committee on Treaties, Kimberlee Weatherall, an associate professor at the University of Queensland, assessed the article in saying "it might be argued that the text of ACTA could be fleshed out through guidelines on an ongoing basis, with possible amendments in the longer term." Citing the relationship with Article 33, she added that "it might further be argued that the exhortations to 'promote cooperation, where appropriate, among [the Parties'] competent authorities', particularly in conjunction with the existence of regular meetings and exchange of information about enforcement practices, creates the basic framework within which more detailed mechanisms can be developed over time".

==== Article 43: Accession ====
After the date in Article 39 passes, any WTO member nation may seek to accede into the agreement. The terms of acceptance would be decided by the committee on an individual, case-by-case basis. The treaty would enter into force for successful applicants thirty days after receipt of its instrument by the depositary.

==== Article 44: Texts of the Agreement ====
The treaty makes equally authoritative English, French and Spanish versions of the text, which for the purposes of signature are part of a single document.

==== Article 45: Depositary ====
Article 45 is the final text of the treaty. It elects the Government of Japan as depositary.

== Criticism ==
Opponents have criticized the act for its adverse effects on fundamental civil and digital rights, including freedom of expression and communication privacy. The Electronic Frontier Foundation among others, have derided the exclusion of civil society groups, developing countries and the general public from the agreement's negotiation process and have described it as policy laundering. The signature of the EU and many of its member states resulted in the resignation, in protest, of European Parliament's appointed rapporteur (Kader Arif), as well as widespread protests across Europe.

=== Secrecy of negotiations ===
The Electronic Frontier Foundation opposes ACTA, calling for more public spotlight on the proposed treaty. Since May 2008 discussion papers and other documents relating to the negotiation of ACTA have been uploaded to WikiLeaks, and newspaper reports about the secret negotiations swiftly followed.

In June 2008, Canadian academic Michael Geist, writing for Copyright News, argued that "Government Should Lift Veil on ACTA Secrecy", noting that before documents leaked on the Internet, ACTA was shrouded in secrecy. Coverage of the documents by the Toronto Star "sparked widespread opposition as Canadians worry about the prospect of a trade deal that could lead to invasive searches of personal computers and increased surveillance of online activities". Geist argued that public disclosure of the draft ACTA treaty "might put an end to fears about iPod-searching border guards" and that it "could focus attention on other key concerns including greater Internet service provider filtering of content, heightened liability for websites that link to allegedly infringing content, and diminished privacy for Internet users". Geist also argued that greater transparency would lead to a more inclusive process, highlighting that the ACTA negotiations have excluded both civil society groups as well as developing countries. Geist reported that "reports suggest that trade negotiators have been required to sign non-disclosure agreements for fear of word of the treaty's provisions leaking to the public". He argued that there is a need for "cooperation from all stakeholders to battle counterfeiting concerns" and that "an effective strategy requires broader participation and regular mechanisms for feedback".

In November 2008, the European Commission responded to these allegations as follows:

It is alleged that the negotiations are undertaken under a veil of secrecy. This is not correct. For reasons of efficiency, it is only natural that intergovernmental negotiations dealing with issues that have an economic impact, do not take place in public and that negotiators are bound by a certain level of discretion. However, there has never been any intention to hide the fact that negotiations took place, or to conceal the ultimate objectives of the negotiations, the positions taken in European Commission Trade 5/6 the negotiations or even details on when and where these negotiations are taking place.

The EU and other partners (US, Japan, Canada, etc.) announced their intention to start negotiations of ACTA on 23 October 2007, in well publicised press releases. Since then we have talked about ACTA on dozens of occasions, including at the European Parliament (INTA committee meetings), and in numerous well-attended seminars. Commission organised a stakeholders' consultation meeting on 23 June in Brussels, open to all – industry and citizens and attended by more than 100 participants. US, Australia, Canada, New Zealand and other ACTA partners did the same.

— European Commission statement (November 2008)

As another indicator of the way that the ACTA process was handled by the EU, the Council of Ministers officially adopted ACTA at a meeting of the Fisheries Council.

To coincide with the negotiation round InternetNZ, a nonprofit organisation, held a PublicACTA event on 10 April 2010 to discuss the known and likely content of the ACTA draft agreement and to develop a statement on ACTA. At the event, the Wellington Declaration was developed by over 100 participants, and was published the following day along with a petition for its endorsement. By 13 April, it had received 6,645 signatures. The Wellington Declaration and the petition was given to the government of New Zealand, which delivered the Declaration to the other negotiating countries.

=== Threats to freedom and human rights ===
Booklet criticizing the treaty

An open letter signed by many organizations, including Consumers International, European Digital Rights (EDRi, an umbrella group for 32 European civil rights and privacy NGOs), the Free Software Foundation (FSF), the Electronic Frontier Foundation (EFF), ASIC, and the Free Knowledge Institute, states that "the current draft of ACTA would profoundly restrict the fundamental rights and freedoms of European citizens, most notably the freedom of expression and communication privacy." The FSF argues that ACTA will create a culture of surveillance and suspicion. Aaron Shaw, Research Fellow at the Berkman Center for Internet & Society at Harvard University, argues that "ACTA would create unduly harsh legal standards that do not reflect contemporary principles of democratic government, free market exchange, or civil liberties. Even though the precise terms of ACTA remain undecided, the negotiants' preliminary documents reveal many troubling aspects of the proposed agreement" such as removing "legal safeguards that protect Internet Service Providers from liability for the actions of their subscribers", in effect giving ISPs no option but to comply with privacy invasions. Shaw further says that "[ACTA] would also facilitate privacy violations by trademark and copyright holders against private citizens suspected of infringement activities without any sort of legal due process".

The FSF has published "Speak out against ACTA", stating that the ACTA threatens free software by creating a culture "in which the freedom that is required to produce free software is seen as dangerous and threatening rather than creative, innovative, and exciting." ACTA would also require that existing ISPs no longer host free software that can access copyrighted media; this would substantially affect many sites that offer free software or host software projects such as SourceForge. Specifically, the FSF argues that ACTA will make it more difficult and expensive to distribute free software via file sharing and peer-to-peer (P2P) technologies like BitTorrent, which are currently used to distribute large amounts of free software. The FSF also argues that ACTA will make it harder for users of free operating systems to play non-free media because digital rights management (DRM) protected media would not be legally playable with free software.

On 10 March 2010, the European Parliament adopted a resolution criticizing the ACTA with 663 in favor of the resolution and 13 against, arguing that "in order to respect fundamental rights, such as the right to freedom of expression and the right to privacy", certain changes in the ACTA content and the process should be made.

=== Criminalising generic medicine ===
According to French EP member Kader Arif, "The problem with ACTA is that, by focusing on the fight against violation of intellectual property rights in general, it treats a generic drug just as a counterfeited drug. This means the patent holder can stop the shipping of the drugs to a developing country, seize the cargo and even order the destruction of the drugs as a preventive measure." He continued, "Generic medicines are not counterfeited medicines; they are not the fake version of a drug; they are a generic version of a drug, produced either because the patent on the original drug has expired, or because a country has to put in place public health policies," he said.

A number of countries such as India and African nations have histories of seeking generic cheaper versions of expensive drugs for infections such as HIV, something that has often been resisted by pharmaceutical companies. "There are international agreements, such as the TRIPS Agreement, which foresees this last possibility," he said. "They're particularly important for developing countries that cannot afford to pay for patented HIV drugs, for example." Arif has stated ACTA would limit the freedom of countries such as India to determine their own medical choices.

Also the non-governmental organization Médecins Sans Frontières has taken a stance against ACTA as a part of their Access Campaign, a campaign promoting the development and access to "life-saving and life prolonging medicines". In their report A blank cheque for abuse: ACTA & its Impact on Access to Medicines, Médecins Sans Frontières concludes that ACTA has "fatal consequences on access to medicines", furthermore that the agreement "does nothing to address the problem of poor quality and unsafe medicines" and finally that ACTA "undermines existing international declarations to protect public health", circumventing the Doha Declaration. Michael Gylling Nielsen, the executive of the Danish division of Médecins Sans Frontières, has in a statement to the media said that "In the end, this is a question of life and death", elaborating his point by mentioning the "possible consequences" of the treaty that "the hundreds of thousands of people who for example have HIV/AIDS will not get the treatment they need".

=== Legal scope ===
Nate Anderson with Ars Technica pointed out that ACTA encourages service providers to collect and provide information about suspected infringers by giving them "safe harbor from certain legal threats". Similarly, it provides for criminalization of copyright infringement on a commercial scale, granting law enforcement the powers to perform criminal investigation, arrests and pursue criminal citations or prosecution of suspects who may have infringed on copyright on a commercial scale. It also allows criminal investigations and invasive searches to be performed against individuals for whom there is no probable cause, and in that regard weakens the presumption of innocence and allows what would in the past have been considered unlawful searches. Additional signatories would have to accept ACTA's terms without much scope for negotiation.

From 16 to 18 June 2010, a conference was held at the Washington College of Law, attended by "over 90 academics, practitioners and public interest organizations from six continents". Their conclusions were published on 23 June 2010 on the American University Washington College of Law website. They found "that the terms of the publicly released draft of ACTA threaten numerous public interests, including every concern specifically disclaimed by negotiators." A group of over 75 law professors signed a letter to President Obama demanding a host of changes to the agreement. The letter alleges that no meaningful transparency has been in evidence.

=== Parallels with SOPA and PIPA ===
Connor Adams Sheets of the International Business Times outlined five categories where digital rights advocates compared but expressed greater concern about ACTA than SOPA. Among these were the treaty's broader international nature, its fundamental lack of transparency, the relative ease of enactment, the degree of support by signatories, and a lack of visibility on the global political stage. Forbes writer E.D. Kain compared the characteristics of ACTA with that of SOPA and PIPA, noting that they were each "defined by [their] opacity: secret negotiations, closed door talks, no public discussion."

== Requests for disclosure ==
In September 2008, a number of interest groups urged parties to the ACTA negotiations to disclose the language of the evolving agreement. In an open letter, the groups argued that: "Because the text of the treaty and relevant discussion documents remain secret, the public has no way of assessing whether and to what extent these and related concerns are merited." The interest groups included: the Consumers Union, the Electronic Frontier Foundation, Essential Action, IP Justice, Knowledge Ecology International, Public Knowledge, Global Trade Watch, the US Public Interest Research Group, IP Left (Korea), the Canadian Library Association, the Consumers Union of Japan, Consumer Focus (UK) and Médecins Sans Frontières' Campaign for Essential Medicines. The Electronic Frontier Foundation and Public Knowledge filed a Freedom of Information Act request, which was denied.

=== Australia ===
A coalition of concerned organisations submitted to the responsible Australian Government department, the Department of Foreign Affairs and Trade.

The submission agreed that reducing counterfeiting is important where it endangers consumer health or safety, or constitutes commercial scale infringement. However, the coalition urged that pursuit of that goal should not threaten legitimate commercial, social, innovative and creative activities, the rights of consumers or the free flow of information. The coalition noted the current proposed treaty raised serious concerns with respect to transparency, increased customs search powers, increased penalties for IP infringement, and lack of due process.

The coalition consisted of:

- the Australian Digital Alliance – a public interest copyright organisation advocating for an appropriately balanced copyright regime;
- the Australian Library and Information Association – the peak professional organisation for the Australian library and information services sector;
- Choice – a not-for-profit consumer organisation that campaigns on behalf of Australian consumers; and
- the Internet Industry Association – Australia's national Internet industry organisation that provides policy input to government and advocacy on a range of issues.

=== Canada ===
The University of Ottawa's Canadian Internet Policy and Public Interest Clinic filed an Access to Information Act request to see the government's position but received only a document stating the title of the agreement, with everything else blacked out.

=== European Union ===
In November 2008, the Foundation for a Free Information Infrastructure requested secret Anti-Counterfeiting Trade Agreement (ACTA) documents from the EU Council, specifically naming twelve documents to be published. The request was denied by the EU council, stating that "disclosure of this information could impede the proper conduct of the negotiations, would weaken the position of the European Union in these negotiations and might affect relations with the third parties concerned". In March 2010, the European Parliament passed a resolution demanding greater transparency in public affairs, which among other things called on the European Commission to make public all documents relating to the negotiations.

=== New Zealand ===
In August 2005, a coalition of NGOs and individuals formed to request more transparency in ACTA negotiations. At briefings held by the Ministry of Economic Development (MED) and the Ministry of Foreign Affairs and Trade (MFAT) on 16 December 2009, representatives from the coalition organisations supported the New Zealand negotiators stated desire to call for more transparency. In December 2009 two New Zealand members of Parliament, Clare Curran (Labour) and Peter Dunne (United Future) also publicly questioned the need for secrecy.

In March 2010, Tech Liberty, a New Zealand digital civil rights organisation, received a response to its Official Information Act request on ACTA. It was given letters from the Ministry of Economic Development and the Ministry of Foreign Affairs and Trade plus the May 2008 cabinet paper in which the New Zealand government agreed to participate in ACTA. Portions of the cabinet paper, and answers to questions posed by TechLiberty, were withheld including the venue for the April 2010 ACTA negotiations, the cabinet discussion paper on participation in ACTA, and all copies of draft negotiation texts, and all documents expressing New Zealand's negotiating position. This information was withheld under Official Information Act provisions allowing for withholding of information where it would prejudice the international relations of the Government of New Zealand, where it would affect the privacy of natural persons, where it was required to maintain the effective conduct of public affairs, and where withholding information was required to enable the government to carry on negotiations (including commercial and industrial negotiations).

In April 2010 a coalition of NZ organisations ran the PublicACTA event immediately prior to the negotiation round held in Wellington New Zealand. At the PublicACTA event participants drafted the Wellington Declaration. The Wellington Declaration was delivered to the New Zealand negotiators, who provided it to representatives from all the other negotiating countries. Following the Wellington negotiation round in April 2010 the text of ACTA was released publicly. This was the only time this occurred during the ACTA negotiations.

=== United States ===
Both the Bush administration and the Obama administration had rejected requests to make the text of ACTA public, with the White House saying that disclosure would cause "damage to the national security." In 2009, Knowledge Ecology International filed a Freedom of Information Act request in the United States, but their entire request was denied. The Office of the United States Trade Representative's Freedom of Information office stated the request was withheld for being material "properly classified in the interest of national security." US Senators Bernie Sanders (I-VT) and Sherrod Brown (D-OH) penned a letter on 23 November 2009, asking the United States Trade Representative to make the text of the ACTA public.

== Protests and petitions ==
=== Petition on the Wellington Declaration ===
Following the drafting of the Wellington Declaration on 10 April 2010, a petition was signed by over 7,000 people worldwide in the first three days.

=== First public demonstrations in Poland ===
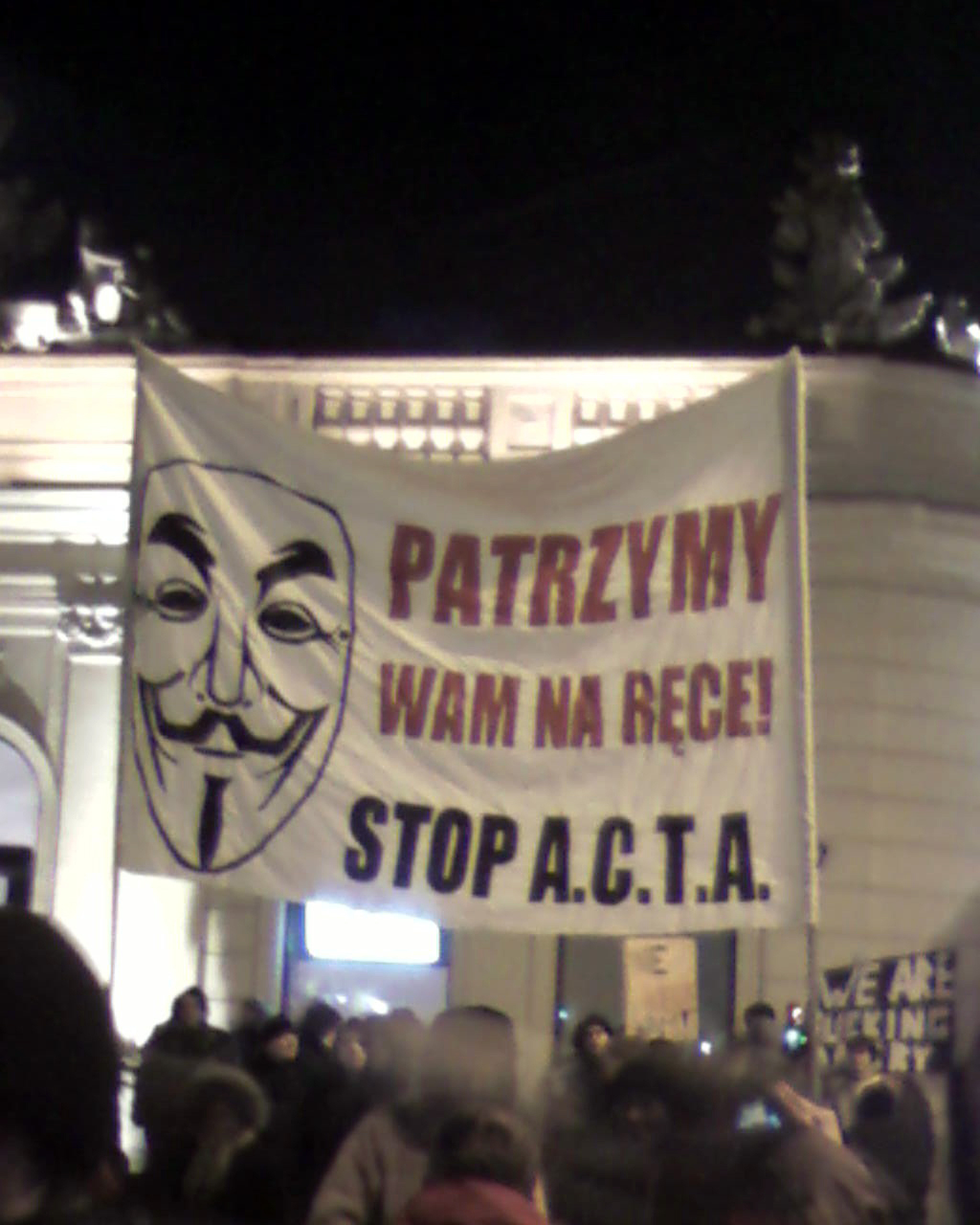
Protests in Poland, January 2012

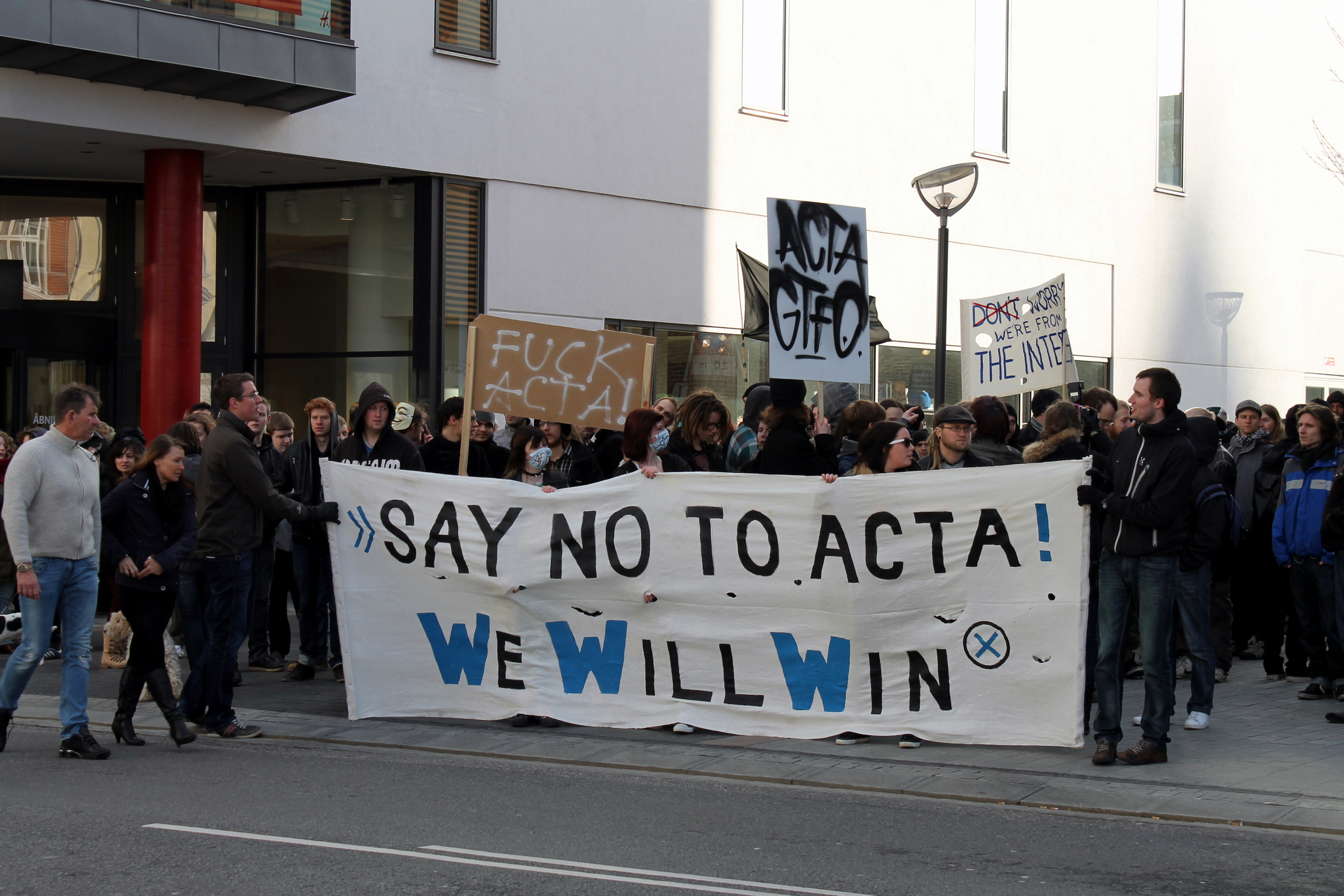
Protests in Denmark, February 2012

After Poland's announcement on 19 January 2012 that it would sign the treaty on 26 January, a number of Polish government websites were shut down by denial of service attacks that started on 21 January. Websites included those of the Chancellery of the Prime Minister, Ministry of Culture and National Heritage, the President, and the Sejm. On 23 January the website of the Prime Minister of Poland was hacked. The content of the page was replaced by a video where the internet users were called to oppose the threats to privacy that were attributed to ACTA. Over a thousand people protested in front of the European Parliament office in Warsaw on 24 January. On 25 January, at least 15,000 demonstrated in Kraków, 5,000 in Wrocław, with considerable protests in cities across the country. Polish social sites Demotywatory.pl, JoeMonster.org, Kwejk.pl, AntyWeb.pl and Wykop.pl announced that they were considering a blackout similar to the SOPA-inspired 2012 Wikipedia blackout to protest Poland's plan to sign the Anti-Counterfeiting Trade Agreement. A poll conducted on 27 January by Millward Brown SMG/KRC indicated that 64% of Poles opposed the agreement's signing, 60% believed the treaty would fail to achieve its primary objective, and 50% thought that it would curtail essential freedoms. On 27 January, protesters across the country numbered in the tens of thousands. Following the demonstrations, Interia.pl and RMF FM facilitated 1.8 million emails to members of parliament related to ACTA, with 97% of those participating being opposed to the treaty.

=== EU Parliament Rapporteur's resignation ===
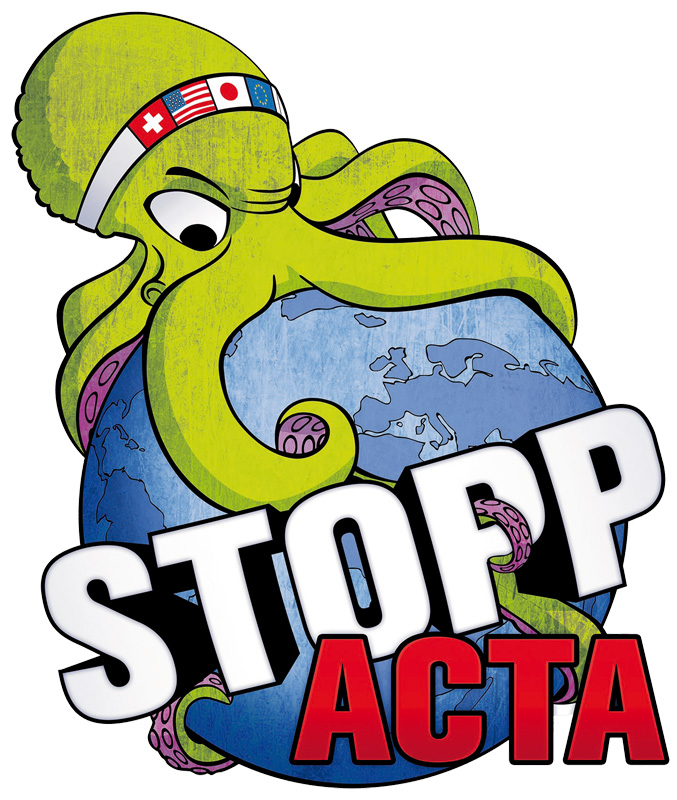
Poster used by the German Pirate Party

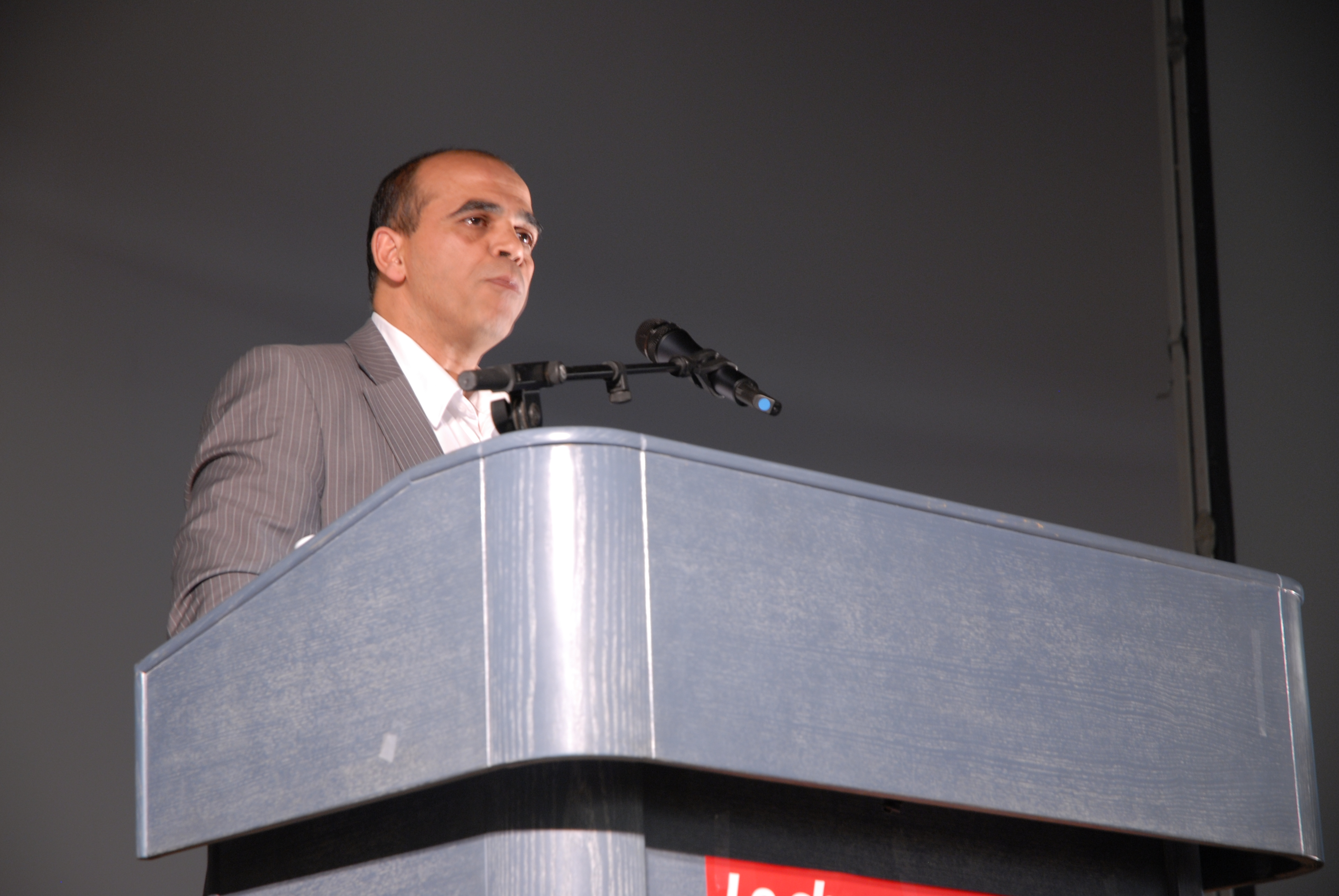
Kader Arif, the European parliament's rapporteur for ACTA, who resigned in protest of ACTA on 26 January 2012

Kader Arif, European parliament's rapporteur for ACTA, resigned from his position on 26 January 2012 denouncing the treaty "in the strongest possible manner" for having "no inclusion of civil society organizations, a lack of transparency from the start of the negotiations, repeated postponing of the signature of the text without an explanation being ever given, [and] exclusion of the EU Parliament's demands that were expressed on several occasions in [the] assembly", concluding with his intent to "send a strong signal and alert the public opinion about this unacceptable situation" and refusal to "take part in this masquerade."

=== Poland ===
On 23 January the Inspector General for Personal Data Protection of Poland, Wojciech Wiewiórowski, recommended not signing ACTA, considering it to be a threat to the rights and freedoms guaranteed by the Constitution of Poland.

On 26 January 2012 a group of Polish politicians expressed disapproval of the treaty by holding up Guy Fawkes masks during parliamentary proceedings. Images of this event quickly spread on the Internet. Mike Masnick of Techdirt resultantly noted that the handmade masks were themselves symbolically "counterfeit," as Time Warner owns intellectual property rights to the masks and typically expects royalties for their depiction. Polish opposition right-wing party Law and Justice subsequently called for a referendum on ACTA.

Later, the Polish Prime Minister Donald Tusk stated that ratification was "suspended." On 17 February 2012, Prime Minister Donald Tusk said Poland was "abandoning plans for ratification" and now views his earlier support for ACTA "as a mistake." Prime Minister Tusk has also sent a letter to his fellow leaders in the EU urging them "to reject ACTA."

Poland has also been a site of major hactivism related to anti-ACTA protests, with a number of Polish governmental websites being hacked to display criticism of ACTA.

=== Slovenia ===
Helena Drnovšek-Zorko, Slovenian ambassador to Japan, issued a statement on 31 January 2012 expressing deep remorse for having signed the agreement. "I signed ACTA out of civic carelessness, because I did not pay enough attention. Quite simply, I did not clearly connect the agreement I had been instructed to sign with the agreement that, according to my own civic conviction, limits and withholds the freedom of engagement on the largest and most significant network in human history, and thus limits particularly the future of our children," she said.

Slovenian members of hacktivist group Anonymous announced opposition against the treaty's signing and posted video threats on various websites against government officials and Nova Ljubljanska banka, accusing the latter of corruption.

According to police estimates, 3000 Slovenians subsequently protested at Congress Square in Ljubljana and around 300 in Maribor on 4 February 2012. The Nova Ljubljanska banka was also taken offline for about one hour by a cyber attack.

=== Sweden ===
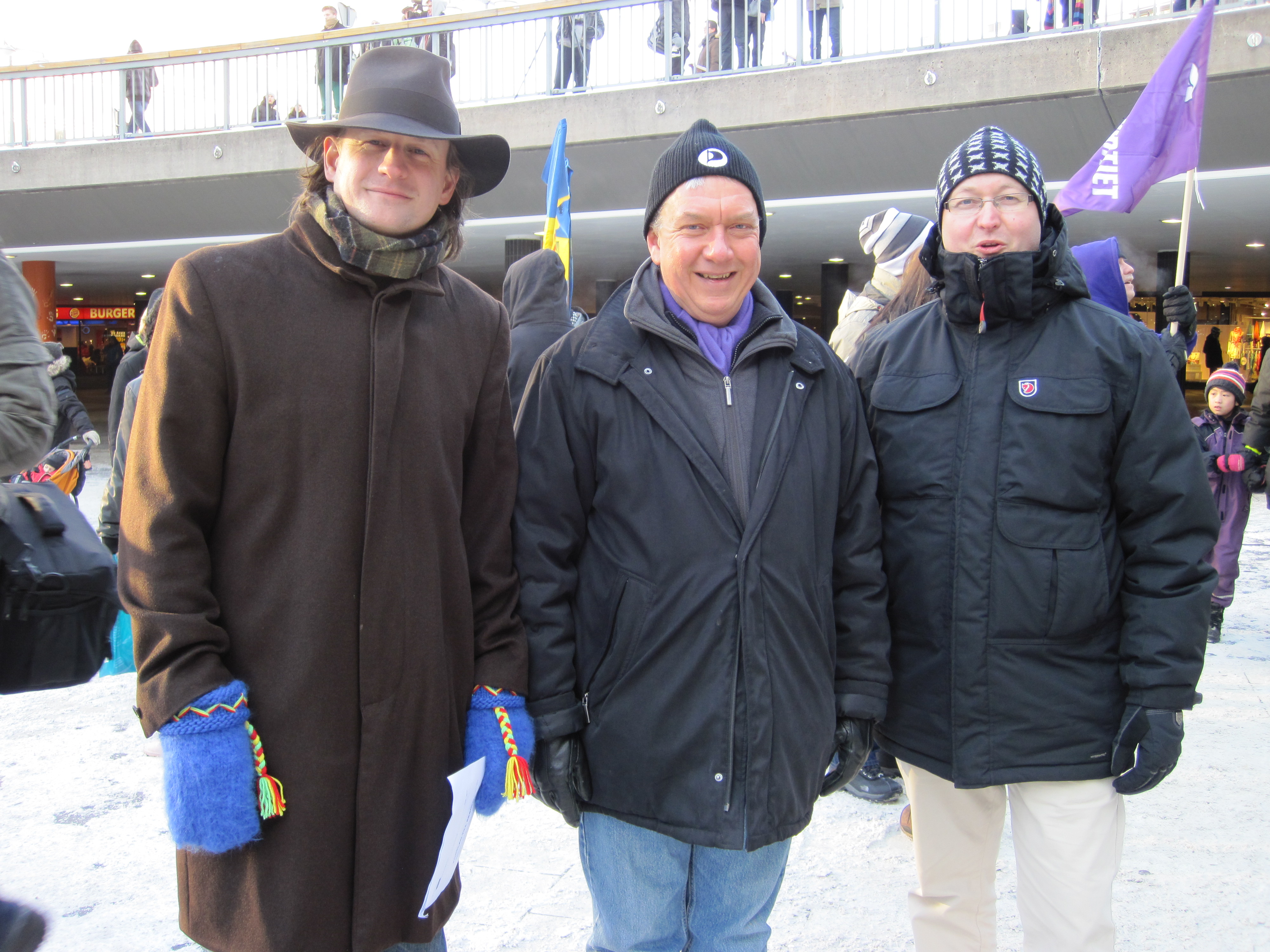
(From left to right) Carl Schlyter, Christian Engström and Mikael Gustafsson, three Swedish Members of the European Parliament opposing ACTA, on an anti-ACTA demonstration in Stockholm, 4 February 2012

Almost 12,000 people signed up for the Facebook event to demonstrate against ACTA. Several thousand Swedes protested in cities across Sweden on 4 February 2012. A smaller protest with a few hundred participants was also arranged in central Stockholm, Helsingborg and Jönköping on 11 February 2012 to coincide with the global protests that day. Another protest subsequently took place in Gothenburg on 25 February 2012 with over 1,000 participants showing up for the demonstration at Götaplatsen. Amongst other speakers was the Canadian-born Laura Creighton, vice-president of the Foundation for a Free Information Infrastructure (2008–present), residing in Gothenburg since around 2002.

The Swedish Pirate Party and its Member of the European Parliaments (MEPs) Christian Engström and Amelia Andersdotter and as its party leader Anna Troberg have also been involved in arranging the Swedish protests., including the later demonstrations on 9 June 2012 in Stockholm and Gothenburg, which were held at the same time as demonstrations in other parts of the world. The Green Party of Sweden and their MEP Carl Schlyter have also worked against ACTA, as well as the Left Party and their MEP Mikael Gustafsson.

=== Protests in Europe on 11 February 2012 ===
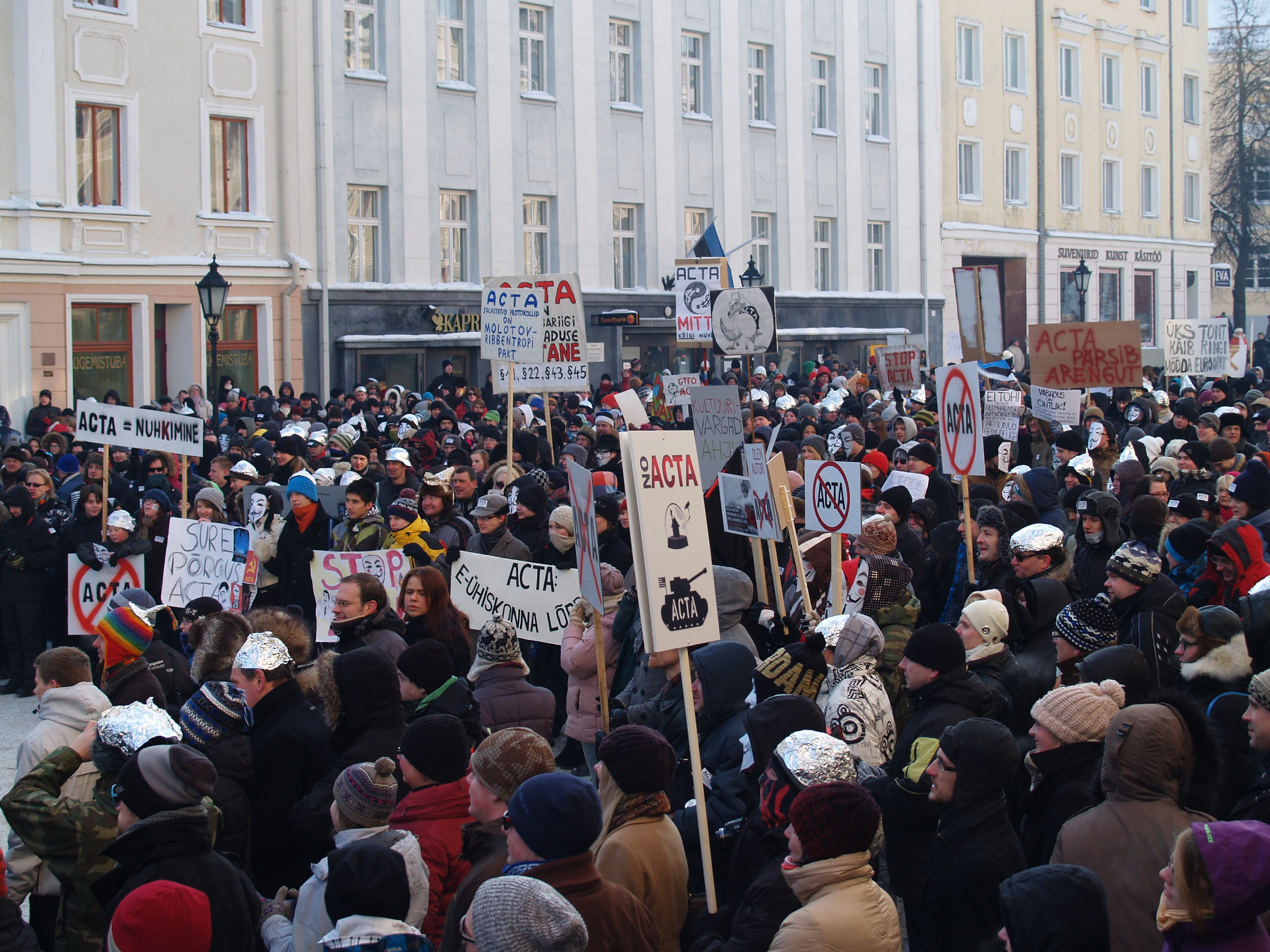
Anti-ACTA demonstration in Tartu, Estonia. 11 February 2012

On 11 February 2012, protests were held against ACTA in more than 200 European cities. On 21 February 2012, a news report noted that "many countries in Europe that have signed the treaty have set aside ratification in response to public outcry, effectively hampering the ratification and implementation of the treaty." Protests in Germany attracted over 10,000 participants, while up to 8,000 Bulgarians protested in Sofia.

=== Petitions ===
On 18 February 2012, a petition at jestemprzeciwacta.pl seeking a referendum in Poland had reached more than 415,300 signatures. A similar worldwide petition at Avaaz collected over 2.5 million signatures since 25 January. A petition directed at United Kingdom citizens, hosted by the UK Government's Directgov website, has reached over 14,500 signatures as of 18 February. A petition directed at Estonian citizens has reached over 7,200 signatures as of 18 February.

In the United States, several ACTA-related White House petitions have been created. One petition, "End ACTA and Protect our right to privacy on the Internet," was created 21 January 2012 and reached the threshold of 25,000 signatures within a month's time. This petition ended 9 June with 47,517 total signatures logged. Afterwards, in June 2012, Deputy US Trade Representative, Ambassador Miriam Sapiro, on behalf of the White House Staff, presented the official White House position in response to the petition. Another petition, "Please Submit ACTA to the Senate for Ratification as Required by the Constitution for Trade Agreements," was created 22 January 2012 but did not reach the threshold of 25,000 signatures within a month's time. With about 12,850 signatures logged at month's end, this petition was "expired" as of 21 February.

== See also ==
- Copyright
- Copyright infringement
- Counterfeit
- Digital rights
- Freedom of information
- Generic drugs
- Right to science and culture
- Secondary liability
- Trans-Pacific Partnership

=== Related treaties and laws ===
- Agreement on Trade-Related Aspects of Intellectual Property Rights (TRIPS), WTO
- Caribbean Basin Initiative (CBI)
- Comprehensive Economic and Trade Agreement (CETA)
- Counterfeiting of medical products convention, also concluded in 2011
- Directive on Copyright in the Digital Single Market (European Union)
- Enforcement Directive (IPRED), EU
- Protect IP Act (PIPA), US, shelved
- Protection of Broadcasts and Broadcasting Organizations Treaty, WIPO, proposed
- Stop Online Piracy Act (SOPA), US, shelved
- Telecoms Package (European Union)
- Transatlantic Free Trade Area
- Trans-Pacific Strategic Economic Partnership

=== Related organizations ===
- Directorate-General for Information Society and Media (European Commission)
- European Round Table of Industrialists
- World Intellectual Property Organization (WIPO)
- World Summit on the Information Society

=== Related protests ===
- Protests against SOPA and PIPA
- Week of action against CISPA
