= Policy laundering =

Policy laundering is the disguising of the origins of political decisions, laws, or international treaties. The term is based on the similar money laundering.

== Hiding responsibility for a policy or decision ==
One common method for policy laundering is the use of international treaties which are formulated in secrecy. Afterwards it is not possible to find out who advocated for which part of the treaty. Each person can claim that it was not them who demanded a certain paragraph but that they had to agree to the overall "compromise".

Examples that could be considered as "policy laundering" are WIPO or the Anti-Counterfeiting Trade Agreement (ACTA).

Harmonization is the process through which a common set of policies are established across jurisdictions to remove irregularities. Regulations can change in any direction, however: regulations may be pushed to the lowest common denominator; but may equally benefit from the 'California effect', where one regulator pushes for the highest standards, setting models for others to follow. Harmonization requires further interrogation, however. In their review of global business regulation, Braithwaite and Drahos find that some countries (notably the U.S. and the UK) push for certain regulatory standards in international bodies and then bring those regulations home under the requirement of harmonization and the guise of multilateralism; this is what we refer to as policy laundering.

— Ian Hosein, 2004

== Circumventing the regular approval process ==
Yet another manifestation of policy laundering is to implement legal policy which a subset of legislators desire but would normally not be able to obtain approval through regular means.

ACTA is legislation laundering on an international level of what would be very difficult to get through most Parliaments.

— Stavros Lambrinidis, Member of European Parliament, S and D, Greece

The American Civil Liberties Union argue that policy laundering has become common political practice in areas related to terrorism and the erosion of civil liberties.

== See also ==
International law:

- Diplomacy
- Harmonisation of law
- International relations
- Investor-state dispute settlement

Political communication:

- Astroturfing
- Covert operation
- Doublespeak
- Media influence
- War on terror

Policy making:

- Joint decision trap
- Lobbyism
- Participation (decision making)
- Political corruption
- Theories of political behaviour
