= Valter Mutt =

Swedish politician (born 1955)

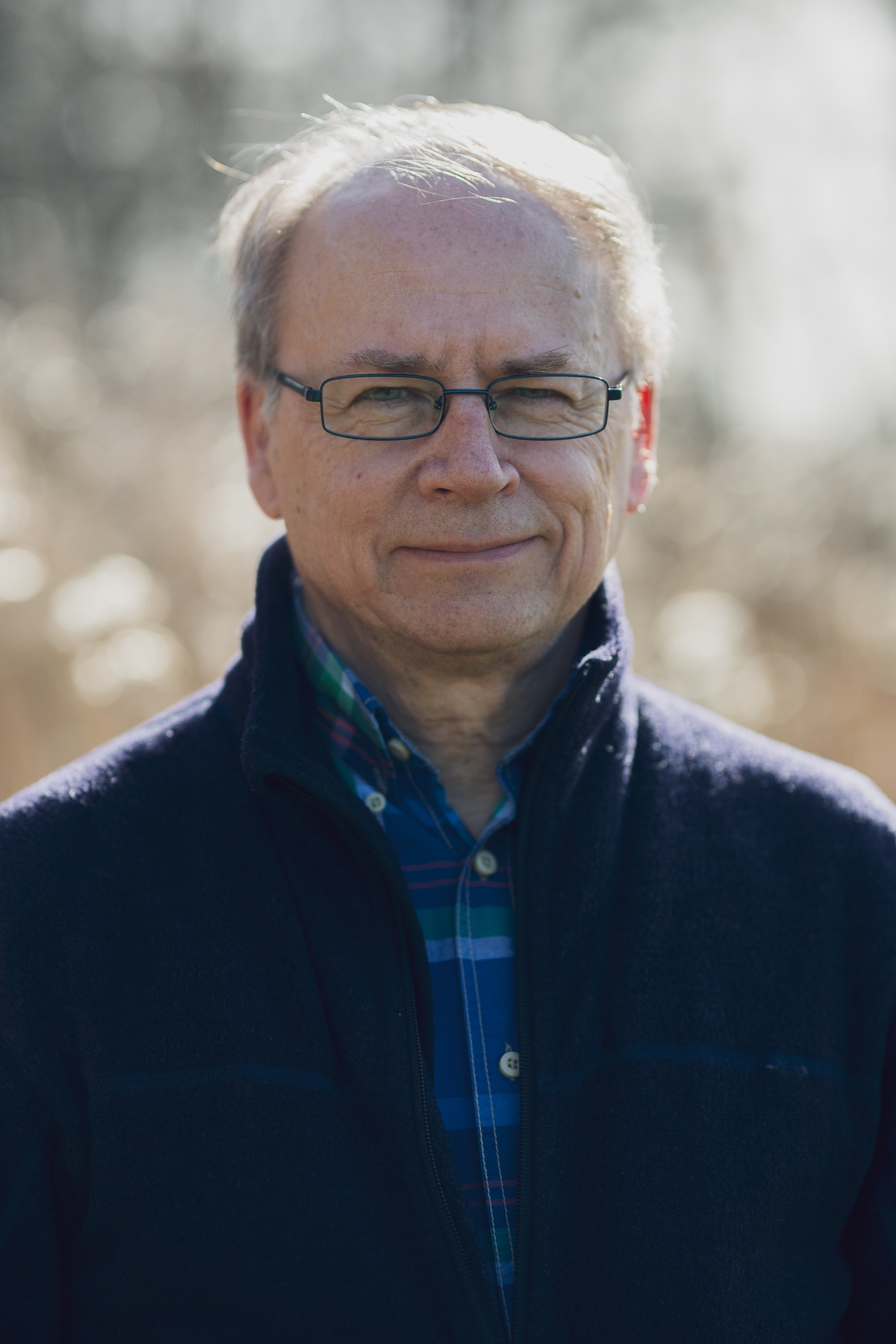

member of the Riksdag
- In office 2010–2018

Personal details
- Party: Green Party; Partiet Vändpunkt; Left Party

Valter Mutt (born August 4, 1955) is a Swedish politician and former parliamentarian. He served in the Riksdag from 2010 to 2018, representing the Green Party.

Following the 2014 election, Mutt was appointed as the Green Party's foreign policy spokesperson. During his tenure as spokesperson he made several statements on foreign policy which disagreed with the policies of the Löfven I Cabinet in which the Green Party was a coalition partner. In November 2014 he proposed that Sweden should offer refugee status to Edward Snowden and transport him from Russia to Sweden in the Swedish government's VIP aircraft. In June 2016, Mutt was removed from the position as spokesperson. He claimed that this was because he had voted against the Sweden-NATO agreement on host nation support in May 2016.

Having been critical of the Green Party's policies for some time, Mutt left the party in January 2019. On 13 February, former Green Party MPs Carl Schlyter, Annika Lillemets and Mutt announced that they would be forming a new political party, Partiet Vändpunkt ("Turning point party"). In the 2019 European Parliament election in Sweden, this party gathered 0.12 per cent of the votes. In 2020, the three founders all left the party and Mutt jointed the Left Party instead.
