= Brussels effect =

Market mechanisms by which the European Union regulation is adopted globally

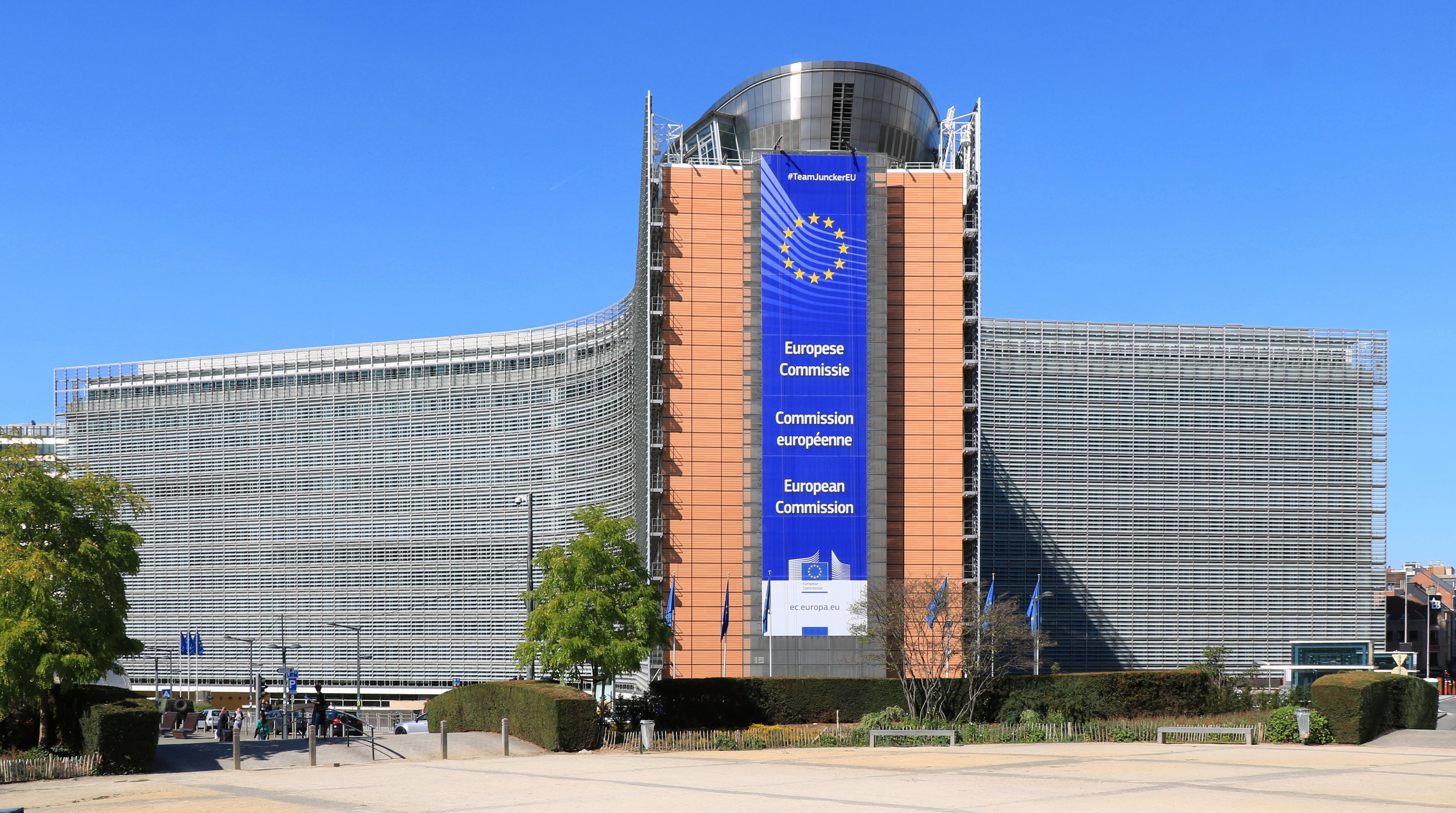
The Berlaymont building in Brussels, the headquarters of the European Commission

The Brussels effect is the process of European Union (EU) regulations spreading well beyond the EU's borders. Through the Brussels effect, regulated entities, especially corporations, end up complying with EU laws even outside the EU for a variety of reasons. The effect is named after the city of Brussels, the de facto capital of the European Union, used as a metonym for the European Union.

The combination of market size, market importance, relatively stringent standards and regulatory capacity of the European Union can have the effect that firms trading internationally find that it is not economically, legally or technically practical to maintain lower standards in non-EU markets. Non-EU companies exporting globally can find that it is beneficial to adopt standards set in Brussels uniformly throughout their business.

The term Brussels effect was coined in 2012 by professor Anu Bradford of Columbia Law School. Scholars could so far not empirically verify the limits of the Brussels effect in international law, especially World Trade Organization (WTO) law. Furthermore, for the Brussels effect to occur, it was shown that not all prerequisites identified by Bradford have to occur cumulatively. Research has indicated that the EU's regulatory power varies substantially depending on the context of the regulation involved.

Since its discovery, the Brussels effect has become a major point of reference in European policy discussions on the EU's global power. However, scholarship has also noted the one-directionality of the Brussels effect framework, as it typically excludes for example the attempts by foreign firms and states to influence EU legislation. Moreover, it has been noted that the impact of the rules instigated by the EU can evolve significantly over time as they get challenged, for example in courts. Partnering with nations outside of the EU is becoming a possible third way for digital governance.

== Limits and criticism ==
Scholars have questioned whether the Brussels effect operates uniformly across regulatory fields. Alasdair Young has argued that the European Union's ability to act as a global regulator varies substantially by policy area and by the structure of the relevant international market. Matti Ylönen has likewise argued that accounts of the Brussels effect can be overly one-directional because they give less attention to attempts by foreign firms and governments to influence European Union rules and to the ways in which regulatory effects can change after rules are adopted.

In 2026, legal scholar Kai Purnhagen and agricultural economist Justus Wesseler proposed what they call the Icarus effect as a possible failure mode of the Brussels effect. In their framework, an Icarus effect may occur when European Union regulatory ambitions are expanded beyond the level at which access to the EU market is sufficient to induce firms or trading partners to adopt EU standards. They argue that, when compliance costs are high and alternative markets are sufficiently attractive, firms may instead redirect trade, withdraw from the EU market, or relocate production, potentially reducing the market power on which the Brussels effect depends.

Purnhagen and Wesseler apply this framework to the EU Regulation on Deforestation-free products, the Ecodesign for Sustainable Products Regulation (ESPR (EU) 2024/1781), and the Corporate Sustainability Due Diligence Directive. They argue that the likelihood of an extraterritorial effect differs between sectors. In their analysis, the EU's comparatively limited and declining share of demand for several commodities associated with deforestation may weaken the leverage of the deforestation regulation, whereas integrated trade in chemicals may give the Ecodesign framework greater capacity to influence production outside the EU.

To reduce the risk of the proposed effect, Purnhagen and Wesseler recommend assessing the relevant market conditions empirically before adopting regulation intended to produce extraterritorial effects, designing rules so that they can be adjusted in response to regulatory learning, and involving affected stakeholders in order to assess whether regulated actors are willing to bear additional compliance costs.

== Examples ==
=== Antitrust ===
The October 2000 $42 billion proposed acquisition of US-based Honeywell by US-based General Electric was blocked by the EU antitrust authorities on the grounds of risking a horizontal monopoly in jet engines. The merger could not proceed because, despite the American Department of Justice having already approved the merger between these two US-based entities, it was not legally possible to let the acquisition proceed in one important market, but not in another.

=== Chemicals ===
US-based multinational Dow Chemical announced in 2006 it would comply with the EU's Registration, Evaluation, Authorisation and Restriction of Chemicals (REACH) regulation for the production and use of chemical substances across its global operation.

=== Airplane emissions ===
In 2012 the EU included aviation into its existing Emission Trading Scheme. This means that any airline, regardless of their country of origin, has to purchase emissions permits for any flights within the European Economic Area. The cost of complying with EU aviation emission regulation puts pressure on manufacturers to design airplanes with improved efficiency and reduced emissions. As major airlines would not likely purchase airplanes specifically to fly outside the EEA, the EU's stricter aviation standards have an impact on global airplane fleets, regardless of the jurisdiction of the airline.

=== Data protection and privacy ===
With the introduction of the Data Protection Directive in 1995 the EU had opted for a strict top-down approach to data privacy. Its successor, the EU's General Data Protection Regulation (GDPR), was adopted on 14 April 2016 and had a global effect. In 2017, during negotiations for a new Japan-EU trade deal, Japan set up an independent agency to handle privacy complaints to conform with the EU's new privacy regulation.

Facebook announced in April 2018 that it would implement parts of the GDPR globally. Sonos announced in April 2018 that it would implement the GDPR globally, and Microsoft announced in May 2018 that it would implement GDPR compliance for all its customers globally.

=== Exploitation of natural resources ===
The Brussels effect can be observed in two regulatory frameworks that regulate the exploitation of natural resources, the Conflict Minerals Regulation and Country by Country Reporting Rules for payments to governments.

=== Consumer electronics ===
Countries with mandatory application of USB-C power ports – for most 5-20v (max 100w) consumer devices – by law

In October 2022 the European Parliament adopted a directive which required many consumer electronic devices – notably mobile phones – to adopt USB-C as a universal charger by 2024. This was seen as being particularly applicable to Apple and its iPhone product range which had, until then, rejected standardisation. The expectation was that, due to the EU's large marketplace, the EU-specific regulation would nonetheless result in a change in how products were manufactured for sale in other countries (to ensure a single global product), and that other jurisdictions would adopt equivalent legislation. As a result, the next iPhone released following the announcement of the directive, iPhone 15, and all subsequent iPhones, have used USB-C charging.

=== Speech regulations ===
Analysts have noted Brussels effects in the manner in which the European Union has designed and implemented restrictions on online speech. Legal scholar Dawn Carla Nunziato noted that the Digital Services Act (DSA) could not be reconciled with American law and would "create tension and conflict with the U.S. speech regime applicable to social media platforms." Technology policy analyst Jennifer Huddleston, writing for the Cato Institute, observed regarding the DSA, GDPR and related efforts: "While this jawboning and direct censorship by foreign actors does not carry an obvious effect on the United States, it limits the diversity of sources online and forces platforms to possibly change their content moderation policies to adapt to the threats and regulations of countries that seek to limit freedom of expression." The Economist characterized the 2024 exchange between Elon Musk and Theirry Breton regarding the interview on X of Donald Trump, and Musk's subsequent disdain of the DSA as defiance of the Brussels effect.

== Etymology ==
Coined by professor Anu Bradford, the term was named after the somewhat similar California effect that can be seen within the United States.

== See also ==
- California effect
- Convergence (economics)
- Foreign relations of the European Union
- Free trade
- Global governance
- Global workforce
- Globalization
- Invisible hand
- Multinational corporation
- Supply and demand
