= Annika Lillemets =

Swedish politician (born 1962)

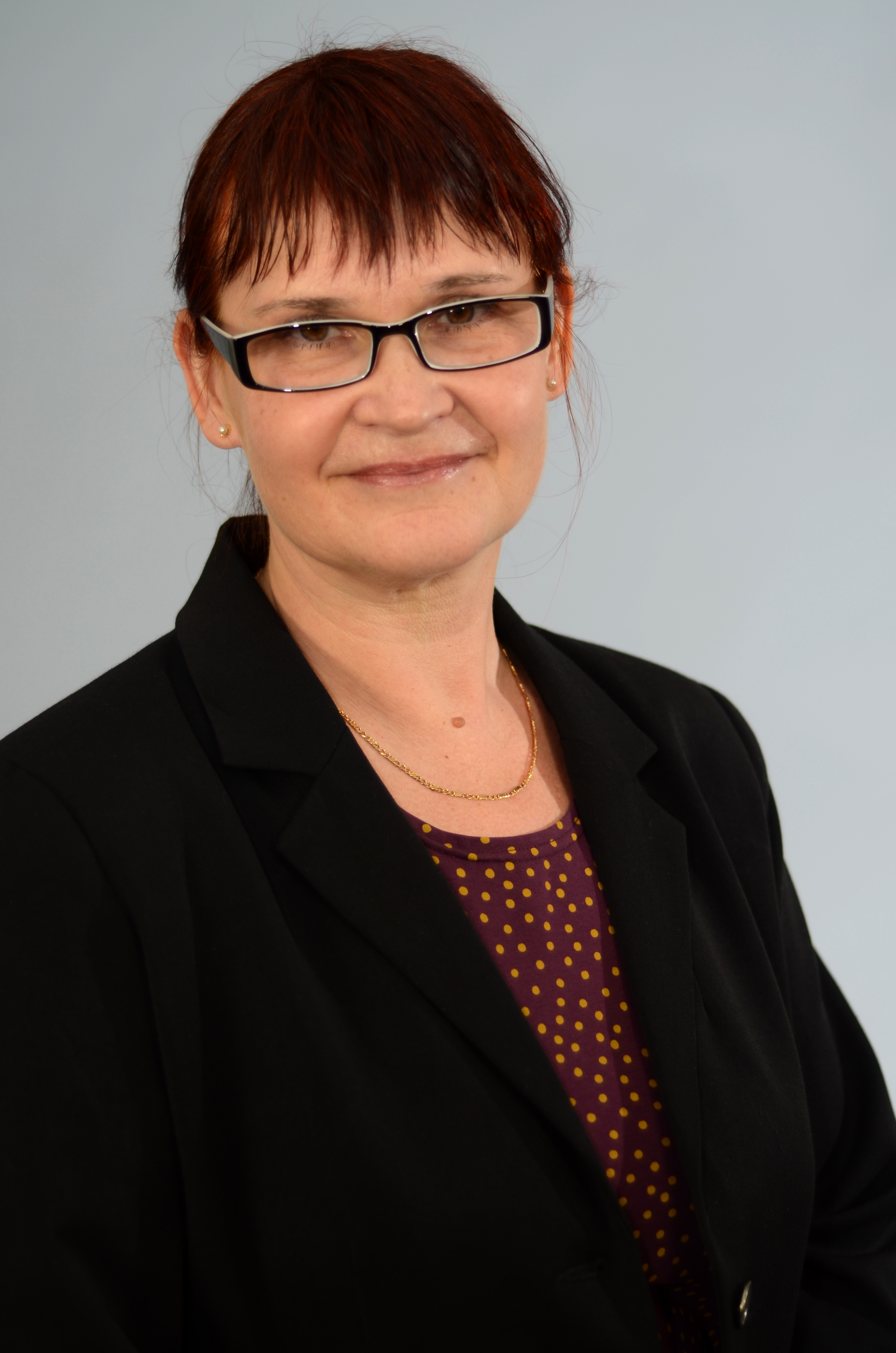
Lillemets in 2012

Annika Lillemets (born 1962) is a Swedish politician and former parliamentarian who was a member of the Riksdag representing the Green Party from 2010 to 2018. In her first term of office from 2010 to 2014 she was an alternate on the tax committee and the traffic committee. In her second term of office, beginning after the general election 2014, she was an alternate in four other committees: the culture committee, the business committee, the social welfare committee and the committee for foreign relations.

In 2020 Lillemets jointed the Left Party.

== Lillemets and the internal crisis in the Green Party 2015–2016 ==
Following the general election of 2014, the Swedish Green Party found itself part of the government for the first time, together with Social Democrats. However, several of the government's decisions were heavily criticised within the Green Party itself. One of the most outspoken internal critics was Lillemets.

After Carl Schlyter, also well known for his critique of several government decisions, was forced away from his post as the chairman of the Parliamentary Committee on European Union Affairs, and Valter Mutt was forced away from the position as a Foreign policy spokesperson, Lillemets voluntarily left her alternate positions in the Swedish Parliament in mid 2016, as a sign of support for the two. Jabar Amin, another Green MP did the same.

Thereafter these four MPs stopped attending the Green Party's own working meetings in the Parliament for several months. Instead they formed a group of their own and had their own meetings. Issues where this group voted against the government's policies included the Host Nation Support with NATO, the temporary tightening of the immigration policy following the 2015 migrant crisis, and Vattenfall’s sale of coal mines. However, in December 2016 the group returned to attend the Green Party's working meetings in the Parliament.
