= Travis Bradford =

American academic

Travis Bradford is a professor of Professional Practice at Columbia University. He teaches at the Columbia Business School, the Earth Institute and the School of International and Public Affairs within the fields of energy and natural resource markets and innovation.

Bradford is also the president at the Prometheus Institute for Sustainable Development. Through his work at the Prometheus Institute, he was part of launching Greentech Media and the Carbon War Room.

Prior to teaching at Columbia University, he taught at the University of Chicago and Duke University.

== Education ==
He earned a B.A. in finance from Georgia State University, an MBA from New York University Stern School of Business and an MPP from the Harvard Kennedy School.

== Books ==
- The Energy System: Technology, Economics, Markets, and Policy, MIT Press, 2017, ISBN 978-0262037525.
- Solar Revolution: The Economic Transformation of the Global Energy Industry, MIT Press, 2006, ISBN 026202604X.
