= Mikael Gustafsson =

Swedish politician (born 1966)

Mikael Gustafsson MEP
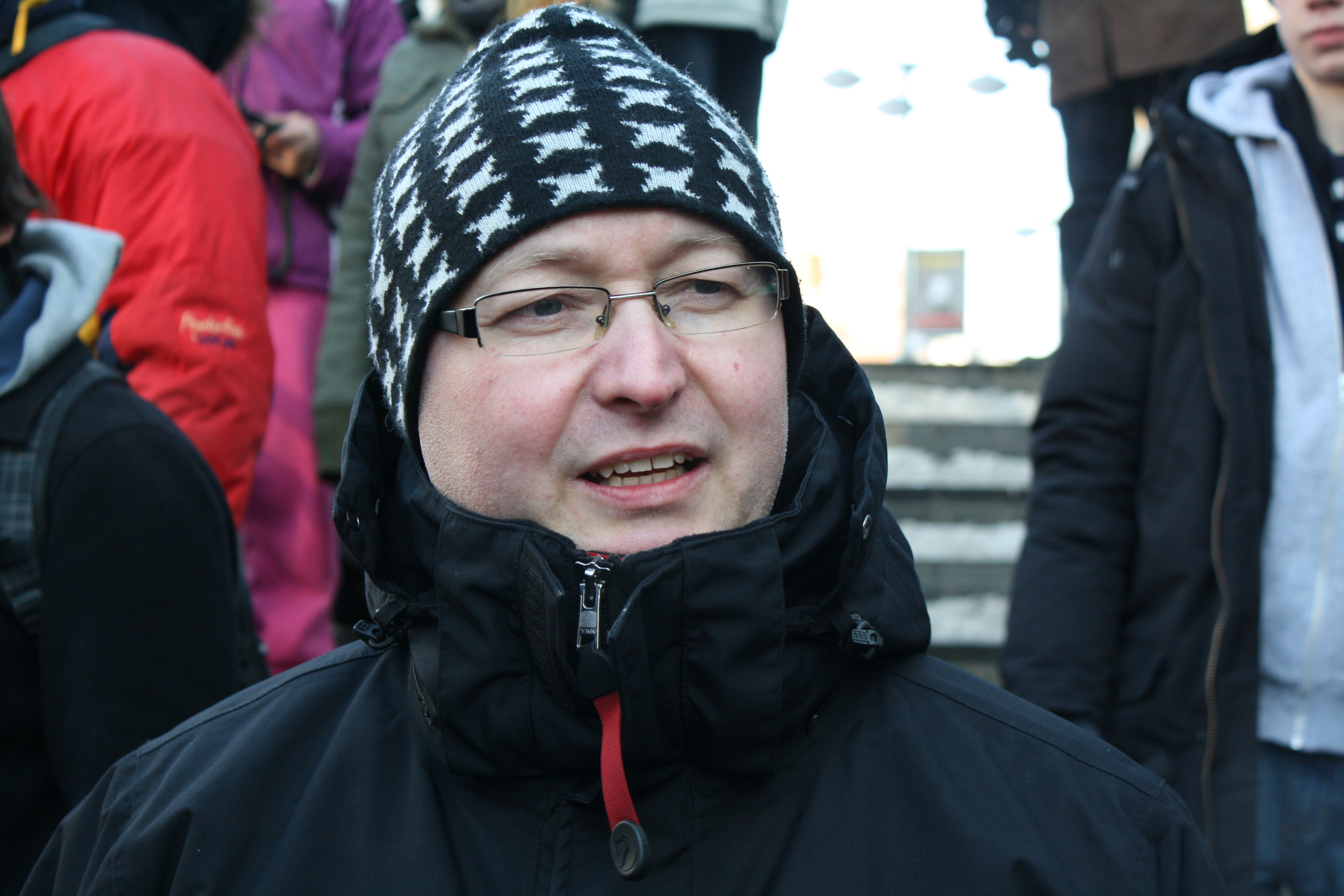
- Finnish-born Swedish politician

Member of the European Parliament
- In office 22 September 2011 – 30 June 2014
- Constituency: Sweden

Personal details
- Born: 6 March 1966 (age 60) Dragsfjärd, Western Finland Province, Finland
- Party: Left Party
- Occupation: Politician

Mikael Gustafsson (born 6 March 1966) is a Swedish politician, who from 2011 until 2014, was a Member of the European Parliament, representing Sweden. He is a member of the Left Party

He served as Chair of the Committee on Women's Rights and Gender Equality from 2011 to 2014.

Gustafsson was born in Dragsfjärd, Finland, into a Swedish-speaking Finnish family.
