= California effect =

Concept in political science

The California effect is the shift of consumer, environmental and other regulations in the direction of political jurisdictions with stricter regulatory standards. The name is derived from the spread of some advanced environmental regulatory standards that were originally adopted by the U.S. state of California and eventually adopted in other states. This process is the opposite of the Delaware effect, which is a race to the bottom in which different countries (or states in the case of Delaware) are reducing their regulatory burden to attract more of the businesses into their jurisdiction. The assumption behind the Delaware effect is that in the competitive regulatory environment, governments have to remove their regulatory barriers to allow easier functioning of their corporations and to attract new companies to establish their business.

While additional regulation can prove to be a burden for any corporation, higher regulatory standards can be a solution to certain externalities which are decreasing the total public good.

This term is mostly associated with David Vogel who called this phenomenon the "California effect".

The actual existence of this effect in the real world is disputed. While there is large discussion on the possible race to the bottom among countries competing for attention of internationally mobile capital, there seems to be some limited evidence that at least in some sectors the California effect can be observed.

== See also ==
- Convergence (economics)
- Global workforce
- Brussels effect
- Globalization
- Free trade
- Invisible hand
- Multinational corporation
- Supply and demand
