= Carl Schlyter =

Swedish politician and MEP

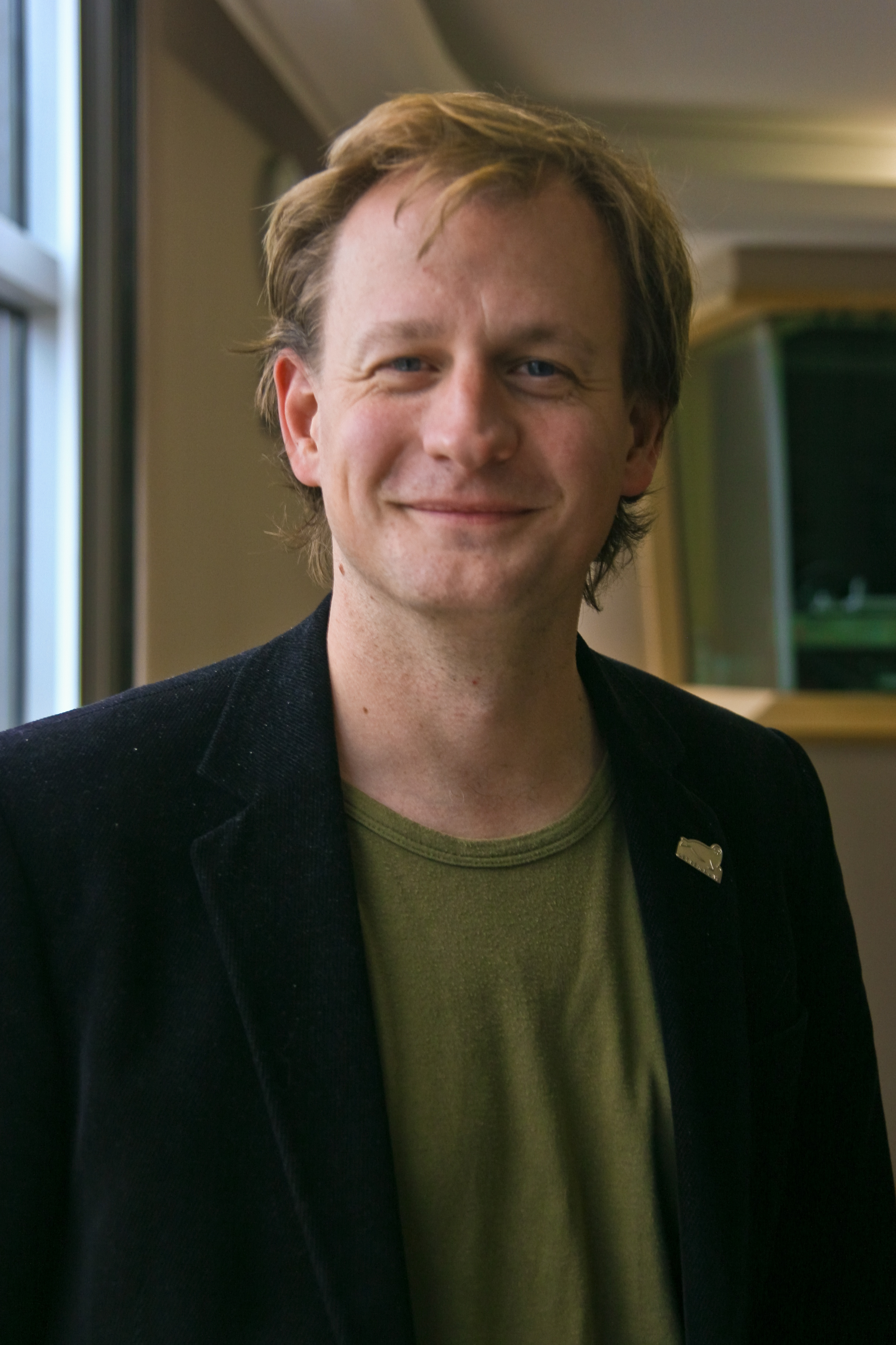

Member of the Swedish Riksdag for Stockholm County
- Incumbent
- Assumed office 29 October 2014

Member of the European Parliament for the Kingdom of Sweden
- In office July 2004 – July 2014

Personal details
- Born: 7 January 1968 (age 58) Danderyd, Sweden
- Party: Partiet Vändpunkt
- Education: Royal Institute of Technology

Video Introduction (English) / (Swedish) / (French)

Carl Schlyter (born 7 January 1968) is a Swedish politician who has been a member of the Swedish Riksdag for Stockholm County since 2014. He was a Member of the European Parliament (MEP) from 2004 to 2014. He is a member of the Green Party, which is part of the European Greens, and sat on the European Parliament's Committee on the Environment, Public Health and Food Safety. He is a member of the ACP-EU Joint Parliamentary Assembly.

He was also a substitute for the Committee on Budgetary Control and the Committee on Fisheries, and a substitute for the delegation for relations with the countries of Southeast Asia and the Association of Southeast Asian Nations.

== Leaving Miljöpartiet and starting up a new party called Partiet Vändpunkt ==
On 16 January 2019, Schlyter announced that he would be leaving the Green Party due to his disagreements with the Social Democrats regarding the 2018-19 government formation. On 13 February, he stated that he would be forming a new political party, Partiet vändpunkt, together with fellow Green Party MPs Annika Lillemets and Valter Mult. The party intends to focus on tackling climate change and claims to be critical of neoliberalism

== Career ==
- Chemical engineering specialising in biotechnology and the environment (Royal Institute of Technology, Stockholm, 1987–1994)
- Research study Impurities in coal (Miami University, Ohio, 1989)
- Museum guide (1994)
- Political secretary of the Green Party in Stockholm City Hall (1994–1995)
- Assistant, European Parliament (1996)
- Responsible for Agenda 21 and the environment, culture and sports administration Stockholm (1997)
- Adviser to the Green Group in the Committee on Budgetary Control (1997–2004)
- Member of the party's Executive (2000–2008)
- Sweden's representative in the European Green Federation (since 2001)
- Sweden's representative in the Global Greens (since 2002)
